= 160s BC =

Decade

This article concerns the period 169 BC – 160 BC.

== Events ==
=== 169 BC ===
==== By place ====
====== Greece ======
- Macedonian forces led by Perseus of Macedon trap a Roman army led by Consul Quintus Marcius Phillipus near Tempe, but the Macedonians fail to take advantage of their resulting superior tactical position.
- King Perseus asks the Seleucid King Antiochus IV to join forces with him against the danger that Rome presents to all of the Hellenic monarchs. Antiochus IV does not respond.

====== Roman Republic ======
- Lex Voconia (The Voconian Law) is introduced in Rome by the tribune, Quintus Voconius Saxa, with the support of Cato the Elder. This law prohibits those who own property valued at 100,000 sesterces from making a woman their heir.

=== 168 BC ===
==== By place ====
====== Albania ======
- The king of Illyria, Gentius, is defeated at Scodra by a Roman force under Lucius Anicius Gallus and then brought to Rome as a captive to be interned in Iguvium. This loss removes Illyria as an important ally for Macedonia and effectively weakens Perseus of Macedon in his battle with Rome.
- The Roman general, Lucius Aemilius Paulus, is elected consul and arrives in Thessaly to lead the Roman army which has been trapped by Perseus' forces.
- June 22 – The Battle of Pydna (in southern Macedonia) gives Roman forces under Lucius Aemilius Paulus a crushing victory over Perseus and his Macedonian forces, thus ending the Third Macedonian War. Perseus is captured by the Romans and will spend the rest of his life in captivity at Alba Fucens, near Rome.
- The Macedonian kingdom is broken up by the Romans into four smaller states, and all the Greek cities which have offered aid to Macedonia, even just in words, are punished. The Romans take hundreds of prisoners from the leading families of Macedonia, including the historian Polybius.

====== Egypt ======
- The joint rulers of Egypt, Ptolemy VI, Ptolemy VIII Euergetes II and their sister Cleopatra II send a renewed request to Rome for aid.

====== Seleucid Empire ======
- The fleet of the Seleucid king Antiochus IV wins a victory off Cyprus, whose governor then surrenders the island to him.
- Antiochus IV then invades Egypt again and occupies Lower Egypt and his forces camp outside Alexandria. However, the Roman ambassador in Alexandria, Gaius Popillius Laenas, intervenes. He presents Antiochus IV with an ultimatum that he evacuate Egypt and Cyprus immediately. Antiochus, taken by surprise, asks for time to consider. Popillius, however, draws a circle in the earth (i.e. "a line in the sand") around the king with his walking stick and demands an unequivocal answer before Antiochus leaves the circle. Fearing the consequences of a war with Rome, the king agrees to comply with the ambassador's demands. In return, the Romans agree that Antiochus IV can retain southern Syria, to which Egypt has laid claim, thus enabling Antiochus IV to preserve the territorial integrity of his realm.
- Jason removes Menelaus as High Priest in Jerusalem, which Antiochus IV regards as an affront to his majesty.

=== 167 BC ===
==== By place ====
====== Seleucid Empire ======
- King Antiochus IV Epiphanes, believing Judea to be in revolt, returns there after the failure of his Egyptian campaign.
- The Jewish priest Mattathias of Modi'in defies the king Antiochus IV's decrees aimed at hellenizing the Jews and specifically defies the order that Jews should sacrifice to Zeus. Mattathias slays a Syrian official and escapes into the Judean hills with his five sons, beginning the Maccabean Revolt, a Jewish rebellion against Seleucid control of Judea.

====== Greece ======
- Private documents collected by the Romans when they capture Perseus of Macedon incriminate political leaders of the Achaean League. Many influential Greeks are deported to Rome.
- On his way back to Rome, the Roman general Lucius Aemilius Paulus is ordered by the Roman Senate to inflict a brutal revenge on Epirus for being an ally of Macedonia. Seventy towns in Epirus are destroyed, and at least 100,000 citizens are sold into slavery. These actions take place despite the fact that Epirus has not aided Perseus in his war with Rome.

====== Roman Republic ======
- Lucius Aemilius Paulus returns to Italy with the King of Macedonia, Perseus, as his prisoner for his triumphal procession in Rome, where the Macedonians captured are sold into slavery. The huge amount of booty brought home after the battle enriches Rome allowing the Government to relieve her citizens of direct taxation. As a gesture of acknowledgment for his achievements in Macedonia, the senate awards Lucius Aemilius Paulus the surname Macedonicus.

====== Parthia ======
- The Parthians capture the key central Asian city of Herat. This victory effectively chokes off the movement of trade along the Silk Road to China and means that the Hellenic kingdom of Bactria is doomed.

=== 166 BC ===
==== By place ====
====== Seleucid Empire ======
- The Seleucid king Antiochus IV mounts a campaign against the Parthians who are threatening his empire in the east. He leaves his chancellor, Lysias, with responsibility for the government of southern Syria and the guardianship of his son.
- The leader of the Jewish revolt against Syria rule, Mattathias, dies and his third son, Judas, assumes leadership of the revolt in accordance with the deathbed deposition of his father.
- The Battle of Beth Horon is fought between Jewish forces led by Judas Maccabeus and a Seleucid army. Maccabeus gains the element of surprise and successfully routs the much larger Syrian army.
- The Battle of Emmaus takes place between the Jewish rebels led by Judas Maccabeus and Seleucid forces sent by Antiochus IV and led by Lysias and his general, Gorgias. In the ensuing battle, Judas Maccabeus and his men succeed in repelling Gorgias and forcing his army out of Judea and down to the coastal plain in what is an important victory in the war for Judea's independence.

====== Roman Republic ======
- The Roman playwright Terence's Andria (The Girl from Andros) is first performed.

====== China ======
- Laoshang leads 140,000 Xiongnu cavalry in a raid in Anding, and they reach as far as the royal retreat at Yong.

=== 165 BC ===
==== By place ====
====== Seleucid Empire ======
- Artaxias I, king of Armenia, is taken captive by the Seleucid king Antiochus IV Epiphanes when he attacks Armenia. Artaxias is forced to recognize Antiochus IV's suzerainty over Armenia before he is released.

====== Roman Republic ======
- The Roman playwright Terence's play Hecyra (The Mother-in-Law) is first performed.

=== 164 BC ===
==== By place ====
====== Egypt ======
- The Egyptian King Ptolemy VI Philometor is expelled from Alexandria by his brother Ptolemy VIII Euergetes and flees to Rome to seek support.

====== Seleucid Empire ======
- The Seleucid king Antiochus IV Epiphanes died while on a campaign in Tabae (or Gabae, now Isfahan) in Persia. He is succeeded by his son Antiochus V Eupator who is only nine years old. The regent for the boy is the late king's chancellor, Lysias, who was left in charge of Syria when Antiochus IV departed for his campaign in Persia. Lysias is, however, seriously challenged by other Syrian generals and finds himself with a precarious hold on power. To make matters worse for him, the Roman Senate is holding Demetrius, the son of the former king Seleucus IV and, therefore, the rightful heir to the Seleucid throne, as a hostage. By threatening to release him, the Senate can influence events in the Seleucid kingdom.
- The Battle of Beth Zur was fought between Jewish rebel forces led by Judas Maccabeus and a Seleucid army led by the regent Lysias. Judas Maccabeus wins the battle and is able to recapture Jerusalem soon after. Judas purifies the defiled Temple in Jerusalem, destroys the idols erected there by Antiochus IV and restores the service in the Temple. The reconsecration of the Temple becomes an annual feast of dedication in the Jewish calendar, Hanukkah.

====== Roman Republic ======
- Rhodes signs a treaty with Rome and becomes its ally.
- Lucius Aemilius Paullus Macedonicus is elected censor in Rome.

==== By topic ====
====== Art ======
- Construction of the detail of the frieze from the east front of the altar in Pergamon, Athena Attacking the Giants, begins and is finished eight years later. It is now kept at the Staatliche Museen zu Berlin, Antikensammlung, Pergamonmuseum in Berlin, Germany.

=== 163 BC ===
==== By place ====
====== Egypt ======
- The Ptolemaic king Ptolemy VI Philometor is restored to his throne through the intervention of the citizens of Alexandria. However, the Romans intervene and partition the kingdom, giving Ptolemy VIII Euergetes Cyrenaica and Ptolemy VI Cyprus and Egypt. The two brothers accept the Roman partition.

====== Seleucid Empire ======
- In the turmoil following the death of Antiochus IV, the governor of Media, Timarchus becomes the independent ruler of Media, opposing Lysias who is acting as regent for young king Antiochus V Eupator.
- Maccabean Revolt:
  - Regent Lysias tries to make peace with the Jews in Judea. He offers them full religious freedom if they will lay down their arms. Moderates including the Hasideans consent, but Judas Maccabeus argues for full political as well as religious freedom.
  - Maccabee campaigns of 163 BC: The Maccabees attack nearby regions to Judea, fighting in a civil conflict between Gentiles and Jews.

====== Roman Republic ======
- The Roman playwright Terence's play Heauton Timorumenos ("The Self-Tormentor") is first performed.

=== 162 BC ===
==== By place ====
====== Seleucid Empire ======
- The Maccabees, under the leadership of Judas Maccabeus, continue their struggle against the Seleucids and persecute the Hellenising faction in Judea.
- Seleucid forces still control the Acra, a strong fortress within Jerusalem that faces the Temple Mount. Judas Maccabeus lays siege to the fortress and in response, the Seleucid general and regent to the young Seleucid king Antiochus V, Lysias, approaches Jerusalem and besieges Beth-zechariah, 25 kilometres from the city. Judas lifts his own siege on the Acra, and leads his army south to Beth-zechariah. In the ensuing Battle of Beth-zechariah, the Seleucids achieve their first major victory over the Maccabees, and Judas is forced to withdraw to Jerusalem.
- Lysias then lays siege to the city. Just when capitulation by the Maccabees seems imminent, Lysias has to withdraw when the commander-in-chief under the late Seleucid king Antiochus IV Epiphanes, Philip, rebels against him. As a result, Lysias decides to propose a peaceful settlement which is accepted by the Maccabees. The terms of peace involve the restoration of religious freedom, permission for the Jews to live in accordance with their own laws, and the official return of the Temple in Jerusalem to the Jews.
- With the aid of the Greek statesman and historian Polybius, the son of the former Seleucid king Seleucus IV Philopator, Demetrius escapes from Rome, where he has been held as a hostage for many years, and returns to Syria to claim the throne from his cousin Antiochus V. In the resulting dispute, Antiochus V and his regent, Lysias, are overthrown and put to death. Demetrius then establishes himself on the Seleucid throne.

====== Georgia ======
- The king of Caucasian Iberia, Saurmag I, dies. Having no son, he is succeeded by his son-in-law, Mirian.

=== 161 BC ===
==== by side ====
====== Seleucid Empire ======
- The rebel Seleucid general and ruler of Media, Timarchus, who has distinguished himself by defending Media against the emergent Parthians, treats Demetrius I's violent accession to the Seleucid throne as the excuse to declare himself an independent king and extend his realm from Media into Babylonia.
- With the restoration of peace in Judea, an internal struggle breaks out between the supporters of Judas Maccabeus and the Hellenic party. The influence of the Hellenic Party all but collapses in the wake of the Seleucid defeat.
- The Jewish High Priest Menelaus, who is supported by the Hellenist party, is removed from office and is executed. His successor is a moderate member of the Hellenic party, Alcimus. However, when Alcimus executes sixty Jews who are opposed to him, he finds himself in open conflict with the Maccabees. Alcimus flees from Jerusalem and goes to Damascus to ask the Seleucid king, Demetrius I, for help.
- The Maccabees, led by Judas Maccabeus, and a Seleucid army, led by the Seleucid general Nicanor, fight the Battle of Adasa, near Beth-horon. Maccabeus wins the battle and Nicanor is killed.

====== Egypt ======
- Ptolemy VIII Euergetes, now king of Cyrenaica, convinces the Roman Senate to back his claim for control of Cyprus, but the Egyptian king Ptolemy VI Philometor ignores this threat, and after Ptolemy VIII Euergetes' attempt to conquer the island fails, the Roman Senate disengages from the dispute.

====== Roman Republic ======
- The Roman playwright Terence's plays Eunuchus (The Eunuch) and Phormio are first performed.
- Envoys of Judas Maccabeus conclude a treaty of friendship with the Roman Senate.

=== 160 BC ===
==== By place ====
====== Seleucid Empire ======
- The Seleucid king, Demetrius I Soter defeats a Jewish rebellion at Palestine.
- In response to the Jewish high priest, Alcimus', request for assistance, the Seleucid general Bacchides leads an army into Judea with the intent of reconquering this now independent kingdom. Bacchides rapidly marches through Judea after carrying out a massacre of the Assideans in Galilee. He quickly makes for Jerusalem, besieging the city and trapping Judas Maccabeus, the spiritual and military leader of the Maccabees, inside. However, Judas and many of his supporters manage to escape the siege.
- Judas Maccabeus and many of his supporters regroup to face the Seleucid forces in the Battle of Elasa (near modern day Ramallah). Greatly outnumbered, the Maccabees are defeated and Judas Maccabeus is killed during the battle.
- Judas Maccabeus is succeeded as army commander and leader of the Maccabees by his younger brother, Jonathan Maccabeus.
- Demetrius I defeats and kills the rebel general Timarchus and is recognized as king of the Seleucid empire by the Roman Senate. Demetrius acquires his surname of Soter (meaning Saviour) from the Babylonians, for delivering them from the tyranny of Timarchus. The Seleucid empire is temporarily united again.
- The Parthian King, Mithradates I, seizes Media from the Seleucids following the death of Timarchus.

====== Bactria ======
- The king of Bactria, Eucratides I, is considered to have killed Apollodotus I, an Indo-Greek king who rules the western and southern parts of the Indo-Greek kingdom, when he invades the western territories of that kingdom.

====== China ======
- A Painted banner, from the tomb of the wife of the Marquis of Dai, of the Han dynasty, in Mawangdui, Changsha, Hunan, is made (approximate date). It is nowadays preserved at the Historical museum in Beijing.

====== Armenia ======
- Artavasdes I succeeds his father Artaxias I as king of Armenia.

====== Roman Republic ======
- The Roman playwright Terence's play Adelphoe (The Brothers) is first performed at the funeral of the Roman general, Lucius Aemilius Paullus Macedonicus.

== Births ==
169 BC

- Liu Fei, Chinese prince of the Han dynasty. He is also the son of Emperor Jing and a half-brother of Emperor Wu (d. 128 BC)

168 BC

- Tiberius Gracchus, Roman politician who would create turmoil in the Republic through his attempts to legislate agrarian reforms in the Roman Republic (d. 133 BC)

165 BC

- Sima Tan, Chinese astrologist and historian (approximate date)

164 BC

- Cleopatra Thea Euergetis ("Benefactress"), ruler of the Seleucid kingdom from 125 BC, a daughter of Ptolemy VI of Egypt and his sister/wife Cleopatra II (d. 121 BC) (approximate date)

163 BC

- Marcus Aemilius Scaurus, Roman politician and ambassador (d. 89 BC)
- Tiberius Sempronius Gracchus, Roman politician, who, as a plebeian tribune, will cause political turmoil in the Republic through his attempts to legislate agrarian reforms; his political ideals will eventually lead to his death at the hands of supporters of the conservative faction (Optimates) of the Roman Senate (d. 132 BC)

161 BC

- Cleopatra III, queen of Egypt from 142 BC (d. 101 BC)
- Demetrius II Nicator, king of the Seleucid Empire from 145 BC and 129 BC (d. 125 BC)

160 BC

- Jugurtha, King of Numidia (d. 104 BC)
- Theodosius of Bithynia, Greek astronomer and mathematician who will write Spherics, a book on the geometry of the sphere (d. c. 100 BC), later translated from Arabic back into Latin to help restore knowledge of Euclidean geometry to the West.
- Quintus Caecilius Metellus Numidicus, Roman statesman and general

== Deaths ==
169 BC

- Quintus Ennius, Roman epic poet, dramatist, and satirist, the most influential of the early Latin poets – and often called the founder of Roman literature or the father of Roman poetry. His epic Annales, a poem telling the story of Rome from the wanderings of Aeneas to Ennius' own time, remains the national epic until it is later eclipsed by Virgil's Aeneid.

168 BC

- Caecilius Statius, Roman comic poet, admirer and imitator of the Greek playwright Menander (b. c. 219 BC)
- Jia Yi, Chinese statesman and poet (b. 200 BC)
- Xin Zhui, wife of Li Cang (利蒼), the Marquis of Dai and Chancellor of Changsha Kingdom, during the Western Han dynasty of ancient China. (b. c. 217 BC)

167 BC

- Gaius Claudius Pulcher, Roman consul in 177 BC

166 BC

- Mattathias, father of Judas Maccabaeus, Jewish priest from Modi'in, near Jerusalem, who has started and briefly led a rebellion by the Jews in Judea against the Seleucid kingdom of Syria
- Perseus, the last Macedonian king of the Antigonid dynasty (b. c. 212 BC)

165 BC

- Mattathias, Jewish leader of the Maccabees
- Phraates I, king of Parthia (Arsacid dynasty)

164 BC

- Antiochus IV Epiphanes ("God Manifest"), Seleucid king of the Syrian kingdom who has reigned since 175 BC, and has encouraged Greek culture and institutions but also attempted to suppress Judaism, which has led to the uprisings in Judea towards the end of his reign (b. c. 215 BC)

163 BC

- Xin Zhui, Chinese noblewoman
- Zhang Yan, known formally as Empress Xiaohui, empress of the Chinese Han dynasty (b. 202 BC)

162 BC

- Antiochus V Eupator, ruler of the Seleucid Empire, who has reigned since 164 BC (b. c. 173 BC)
- Lysias or Lusias, Seleucid general and governor of Syria and regent for Antiochus V Eupator
- Saurmag I, king of Caucasian Iberia
- Gnaeus Octavius, Roman statesman and general

161 BC

- Nicanor, Seleucid general

160 BC

- Artaxias I, king of Armenia who has ruled since 190 BC and the founder of the Artaxiad dynasty, whose members would rule the Kingdom of Armenia for nearly two centuries
- Apollodotus I, Indo-Greek king who, since 180 BC, has ruled the western and southern parts of the Indo-Greek kingdom, from Taxila in Punjab to the areas of Sindh and possibly Gujarat
- Gaius Laelius, Roman general and politician who was involved in Rome's victory during the Second Punic War between Rome and Carthage (approximate date)
- Judas Maccabeus, third son of the Jewish priest Mattathias, who led the Maccabean revolt against the Seleucid Empire until his death
- Lucius Aemilius Paullus Macedonicus, Roman consul, politician and general whose victory over the Macedonians in the Battle of Pydna ended the Third Macedonian War (b. c. 229 BC)
- Timarchus, Seleucid nobleman, possibly from Miletus in Anatolia, appointed governor of Media in western Iran by the Seleucid king Antiochus IV Epiphanes and who has rebelled against his successor, Demetrius I Soter, until he is killed in a battle with Demetrius' forces
