= Roman–Jewish Treaty =

161 BCE agreement between Judas Maccabeus and the Roman Republic

The Roman–Jewish Treaty was an agreement made between Judas Maccabeus and the Roman Republic according to the book 1 Maccabees and Josephus's Jewish Antiquities. It took place around 161 BCE and was the first recorded contract between Judea and Ancient Rome. The Romans apparently extended an offer of aid to the Judean rebel side of the Maccabean Revolt. It does not appear the treaty ever resulted in direct action by the Romans in support of the Hasmoneans, but it may have deterred the Seleucid Empire, the regional power in the era, from taking more extreme measures against Judea.

== Background ==
During the early 2nd century BCE, Rome's power and influence in the Eastern Mediterranean region was growing, while that of the Hellenistic Greek successor states formed from the conquests of Alexander the Great was declining. Rome had defeated the Greek Syrians of the Seleucid Empire in the Roman–Seleucid War of 192–189 BCE and imposed terms at the Treaty of Apamea that required the Seleucid Empire to pay Rome an indemnity, as well as send important nobles to Rome as hostages. Rome defeated Antigonid Macedonia in the Third Macedonian War of 171–168 BCE, placing the Greek heartland under Roman influence. Rome then interfered in the Sixth Syrian War between the Seleucids and Ptolemaic Egypt, forcing Seleucid King Antiochus IV to choose between stopping his invasion of Egypt or facing war with Rome. The Roman intervention resulted in the war ending and Antiochus forced to hand back Cyprus to the Ptolemaic Kingdom. This incident was perceived as a humiliation of Antiochus and a sign to those discontent with the leadership of the Seleucid Empire that they might have a powerful ally in Rome.

The treaty was negotiated during the Maccabean Revolt, an attempt by Judeans first to stop Seleucid decrees against the practices of Second Temple Judaism, and later to acquire autonomy for the region. Judas Maccabeus won a number of victories and captured Jerusalem around December 164 BCE. Around 161 BCE, he sent two emissaries, Eupolemus son of John of the clan of Accos (Aramaic Hakkoz) and Jason son of Eleazar, to establish a treaty of friendship with the Roman Senate. Their mission may have been aided by the Roman Senate being unhappy at Demetrius escaping from Rome and taking the Seleucid throne, against their wishes of keeping the pliant and weak young Antiochus V in charge.

== Primary sources ==
In 1 Maccabees, the treaty is preceded by several paragraphs of introduction which praise the Romans for their great strength and their unique system of government. The clauses of the treaty require each party to aid the other if it is attacked, and to refrain from helping the enemies of the other party. The treaty also contains an assurance by the Romans that they have told the Seleucid King Demetrius I not to attack the Jews.

And this is a copy of the letter that they wrote in reply, on bronze tablets, and sent to Jerusalem to remain with them there as a memorial of peace and alliance:

May all go well with the Romans and with the nation of the Jews at sea and on land for ever, and may sword and enemy be far from them. If war comes first to Rome or to any of their allies in all their dominion, the nation of the Jews shall act as their allies wholeheartedly, as the occasion may indicate to them. To the enemy that makes war they shall not give or supply grain, arms, money, or ships, just as Rome has decided; and they shall keep their obligations without receiving any return. In the same way, if war comes first to the nation of the Jews, the Romans shall willingly act as their allies, as the occasion may indicate to them. And to their enemies there shall not be given grain, arms, money, or ships, just as Rome has decided; and they shall keep these obligations and do so without deceit. Thus on these terms the Romans make a treaty with the Jewish people. If after these terms are in effect both parties shall determine to add or delete anything, they shall do so at their discretion, and any addition or deletion that they may make shall be valid.

Concerning the wrongs that King Demetrius is doing to them, we have written to him as follows, "Why have you made your yoke heavy on our friends and allies the Jews? If now they appeal again for help against you, we will defend their rights and fight you on sea and on land."

— 1 Maccabees 8:22-32

2 Maccabees briefly mentions the diplomat Eupolemus in passing while discussing his father John. It says that John had negotiated concessions for the Jews, presumably with Antiochus III after his conquest of Coele-Syria, concessions that the new High Priest Jason was foolishly discarding:

He [Jason] set aside the existing royal concessions to the Jews, secured through John the father of Eupolemus, who went on the mission to establish friendship and alliance with the Romans; and he destroyed the lawful ways of living and introduced new customs contrary to the law.

— 2 Maccabees 4:11

2 Maccabees 11 also includes a document detailing a discussion with some Roman legates on their way to Antioch – not a full treaty, but showing that the Romans were monitoring the Jewish–Seleucid conflict and were staying in contact with both sides in the 160s BCE. This behavior would fit with Polybius's depiction of a Roman policy of promoting disunity and division within the Seleucid Empire.

Diodorus of Sicily reports the feud between the Hasmonean brothers Hyrcanus II and Aristobulus II, and that the two of them contended with a delegation of Jews opposed to both Hasmoneans. It seems to also attest to the alliance when reporting the delegation's case:

...their ancestors, when they rebelled from Demetrius, had sent envoys to the senate. In response, the senate granted them authority over the Jews, who were to be free and autonomous, under the leadership not of a king but of a high priest. But their current rulers [Hyrcanus and Aristobulus], who had abolished their ancestral laws, had unjustly forced the citizens into subjection; with the help of a large number of mercenaries, they had procured the kingship through violence and much bloodshed.

— Diodorus Siculus Book 40

The historian Justin also seems to mention the alliance. While Justin wrote much later in the 2nd century, the source he was abridging from wrote in the first decades of the first century during the reign of Augustus:

After they had revolted from Demetrius, having sought the friendship of the Romans, they [the Jews] became the first of all eastern peoples to receive freedom, the Romans at that time willingly granting it from a foreign power.

— Justin, Epitome of the Philippic History of Pompeius Trogus

The historian Josephus's Jewish Antiquities also includes an account of the treaty. Josephus almost certainly had a copy of 1 Maccabees that he used as a source, and Josephus largely paraphrases the account in 1 Maccabees without adding anything new.

== Authenticity ==
Mirabilia Urbis Romae, a popular medieval guidebook to Rome for the use of Christian pilgrims, mentions that the Greek church of San Basilio should be visited on account of a bronze tablet that had once been affixed to its wall. The Mirabilia in chapter 24 reports: in muro S. Basilio fuit magna tabula aenea, ubi fuit scripta amicitia in loco bono et notabili, quae fuit inter Romanos et Iudaeos tempore Iudae Machabaei. In English: "Attached to the wall of [the church of] San Basilio was a large bronze tablet where there was written, in a suitable and conspicuous place, friendship between the Romans and the Jews in the time of Judas Maccabaeus."

Israeli scholar Dov Gera notes the similarity in form between the Roman-Jewish treaty and other comparable agreements, arguing that it was a legitimate agreement with the Romans rather than wishful thinking by the author of 1 Maccabees.

== Impact ==
Despite the treaty, Rome did not directly militarily intervene in the Maccabean Revolt or the various wars of the early Hasmonean kingdom, nor were they obligated to by the rather flexible terms. Rather, the treaty was more a matter of proving legitimacy: that the premier power of the world recognized the nascent Jewish movement as a people worthy of their own autonomy and support. Rome's policy of generally endorsing breakaways such as the Hasmoneans or Timarchus helped weaken the authority of Demetrius I, a gamble that would eventually pay off with the movement of Alexander Balas, who challenged Demetrius I for leadership backed by mercenaries paid for by Rome and Pergamon. Rome's indirect pressure thus indeed weakened the Seleucid Empire, which benefited both the Hasmoneans and Rome to the detriment of the Seleucids.

According to 1 Maccabees 12, Jonathan Apphus, in his role as High Priest, sent an embassy with a letter to Rome renewing friendly relations. (It also records a letter sent to Sparta, which is unexpected as Sparta was a weak and unimportant polity in this period.) It is unclear what impact it had, if any, nor is it clear if there was a special occasion for it; it may well have been another attempt to demonstrate the legitimacy of Hasmonean rule to would-be internal opponents. Based on the date of the events it is described near, it seems this embassy was around 143 BCE, but historians express caution about assuming this too much as the embassy is not directly dated and might be being described where it is for literary reasons instead. Jonathan's successor, his brother Simon Thassi, is also recorded by 1 Maccabees as sending "a great golden shield weighing 1,000 minas" to maintain relations, and Rome sending a letter in reply. That said, aspects of the story are dubious and likely fictitious, exaggerated, or a figure of speech; 1,000 minas would be perhaps half a ton of gold, an unlikely and exorbitant hoard. It also includes a sweeping extradition request seemingly to King Ptolemy VIII Euergetes II of Egypt that he should send anti-Hasmonean troublemakers who fled to Egypt back to Judea to be punished; however, extradition was rare in antiquity, and the passage reads more like wishful thinking or an addendum added by the Judean writer to a much smaller proposal by the Roman envoy.

One mysterious incident that may or may not have happened involves Josephus recording a complaint from the Hasmoneans about Seleucid depredations around Joppa. Josephus records an appeal from the Hasmoneans to the Romans to ask them to demand the Seleucids restore Hasmonean control of the coastal region, as well as the end of a Seleucid embargo on Judean exports. The incident is undated and the resolution unclear, although the Hasmoneans would eventually control the coastal region. Historian Chris Seeman suggests that this most likely happened c. 113–112 BCE during the reign of John Hyrcanus, and that the Jewish appeal was apparently successful in getting the Seleucids under King Antiochus IX to back down.

The treaty's relevance came to an end with the Hasmonean civil war between Aristobulus II and Hyrcanus II. Both feuding brothers appealed to Roman general Pompey. Pompey was then in the region after participating in the Third Mithridatic War, defeating King Tigranes of Armenia, and subjugating the remnant Seleucids in Antioch. Pompey seems to have been informed about the long-standing alliance, and even allowed some of its provision to influence the eventual settlement. Regardless, the outcome surely soured most Jews on Rome, previously a distant if powerful friend, but now overlord. The Hasmoneans were reduced to client king status. They still managed internal Judean affairs, but their political independence was shattered.
