= 167 BC =

167 BC in various calendars
- Gregorian calendar: 167 BC; CLXVII BC
- Ab urbe condita: 587
- Ancient Egypt era: XXXIII dynasty, 157
- Pharaoh: Ptolemy VI Philometor, 14
- Ancient Greek Olympiad (summer): 153rd Olympiad, year 2
- Assyrian calendar: 4584
- Balinese saka calendar: N/A
- Bengali calendar: −760 – −759
- Berber calendar: 784
- Buddhist calendar: 378
- Burmese calendar: −804
- Byzantine calendar: 5342–5343
- Chinese calendar: 癸酉年 (Water Rooster); 2531 or 2324 — to — 甲戌年 (Wood Dog); 2532 or 2325
- Coptic calendar: −450 – −449
- Discordian calendar: 1000
- Ethiopian calendar: −174 – −173
- Hebrew calendar: 3594–3595
- Hindu calendars
- Vikram Samvat: −110 – −109
- Shaka Samvat: N/A
- Kali Yuga: 2934–2935
- Holocene calendar: 9834
- Iranian calendar: 788 BP – 787 BP
- Islamic calendar: 812 BH – 811 BH
- Javanese calendar: N/A
- Julian calendar: N/A
- Korean calendar: 2167
- Minguo calendar: 2078 before ROC 民前2078年
- Nanakshahi calendar: −1634
- Seleucid era: 145/146 AG
- Thai solar calendar: 376–377
- Tibetan calendar: ཆུ་མོ་བྱ་ལོ་ (female Water-Bird) −40 or −421 or −1193 — to — ཤིང་ཕོ་ཁྱི་ལོ་ (male Wood-Dog) −39 or −420 or −1192

Year 167 BC was a year of the pre-Julian Roman calendar. At the time, it was known as the Year of the Consulship of Paetus and Pennus (or, less frequently, year 587 Ab urbe condita). The denomination 167 BC for this year has been used since the early medieval period, when the Anno Domini calendar era became the prevalent method in Europe for naming years.

== Events ==
=== By place ===
==== Seleucid Empire ====
- King Antiochus IV Epiphanes, believing Judea to be in revolt, returns there after the failure of his Egyptian campaign.
- The Jewish priest Mattathias of Modi'in defies the king Antiochus IV's decrees aimed at hellenizing the Jews and specifically defies the order that Jews should sacrifice to Zeus. Mattathias slays a Syrian official and escapes into the Judean hills with his five sons, beginning the Maccabean Revolt, a Jewish rebellion against Seleucid control of Judea.

==== Greece ====
- Private documents collected by the Romans when they capture Perseus of Macedon incriminate political leaders of the Achaean League. Many influential Greeks are deported to Rome.
- On his way back to Rome, the Roman general Lucius Aemilius Paulus is ordered by the Roman Senate to inflict a brutal revenge on Epirus for being an ally of Macedonia. Seventy towns in Epirus are destroyed, and at least 100,000 citizens are sold into slavery. These actions take place despite the fact that Epirus has not aided Perseus in his war with Rome.

==== Roman Republic ====
- Lucius Aemilius Paulus returns to Italy with the King of Macedonia, Perseus, as his prisoner for his triumphal procession in Rome, where the Macedonians captured are sold into slavery. The huge amount of booty brought home after the battle enriches Rome allowing the Government to relieve her citizens of direct taxation. As a gesture of acknowledgment for his achievements in Macedonia, the senate awards Lucius Aemilius Paulus the surname Macedonicus.

==== Parthia ====
- The Parthians capture the key central Asian city of Herat. This victory effectively chokes off the movement of trade along the Silk Road to China and means that the Hellenic kingdom of Bactria is doomed.

== Deaths ==
- Gaius Claudius Pulcher, Roman consul in 177 BC
