= Hasideans =

Jewish group of the 2nd century BC Maccabean Revolt

The Hasideans (Hebrew: חסידים הראשונים, Hasidim ha-Rishonim, Greek Ἁσιδαῖοι or Asidaioi, also transcribed as Hasidaeans and Assideans) were a Jewish group during the Maccabean Revolt that took place from around 167–142 BCE. The Hasideans are mentioned three times in the books of the Maccabees, the main contemporary sources from the period. According to the book 1 Maccabees, during the early phases of the anti-Jewish decrees and persecution proclaimed by King Antiochus IV Epiphanes, some Hasideans joined up with Mattathias the Hasmonean as he marshalled forces and allies for his rebellion (~167–166 BCE). Later on, during the term of High Priest Alcimus, some Hasideans apparently trusted Alcimus's promises at first and attempted to negotiate a settlement with the government, but were betrayed and executed (~161 BCE). In the book 2 Maccabees, Judas Maccabeus is described as the leader of the Hasideans and of them all as troublemakers disrupting the peace, but by Alcimus, a source the book considers untrustworthy and corrupt.

The Hasideans have been the object of much scholarly speculation: were they a specific group with a coherent ideology, or merely a generic term for "the faithful"? If they were a group, what was their religious and political stance? What happened to them after the Maccabean Revolt concluded? Were they predecessors of the Pharisees, the Essenes, both, or neither? Scholars have come to different conclusions: from seeing them as religious "moderates" whose main goal was the preservation of traditionalist Judaism against Hellenism (but not necessarily for establishing a separate independent political state) to seeing them as simply as a very religious group who were betrayed.

== The term hasid ==
The Hebrew word hasid means "pious". It was thus a natural term of self-identification for various individuals and groups. The name "Hasidim" occurs at several points in the Book of Psalms in the sense of "the pious". Psalm 79 describes many hasidim being slaughtered near Jerusalem by Israel's enemies, while Psalm 149 depicts hasidim as warriors who "execute vengeance on the nations and punishment on the peoples". The date of composition of these psalms is uncertain; some scholars date them to the Maccabean period and consider the verses in question to refer to the hasidim at this time, while others disagree and assign an earlier date to these psalms.

Later rabbinic Judaism in Talmudic sources use the term hasid as well, although generally to individual pious people rather than a particular group or sect. These sources generally long post-date the Maccabean period, though.

While the term comes from Hebrew, the books of the Maccabees only survived in Greek form, hence "Asidaioi" and variants. It appears to have been used as a loanword; the author of 2 Maccabees says the group was "called" Asidaioi, which is generally the terminology for introducing a non-Greek word to merely pronounce.

== Primary sources ==
Then there united with them a company of Hasideans, mighty warriors of Israel, all who offered themselves willingly for the law. And all who became fugitives to escape their troubles joined them and reinforced them.

— 1 Maccabees 2:42-43

1 Maccabees relates that at the start of the conflict around 167–166 BCE, some of those "who had rejected the king's command" forbidding traditional Jewish practices such as circumcision and Jewish dietary laws had escaped into the wilderness. The empire's soldiers had attacked them on the Sabbath, they declined to defend themselves, and were killed. Mattathias the Hasmonean uses the incident to rally support for his brand of resistance which allowed for warfare on the Sabbath. The author of 1 Maccabees, a source very much favorable to the Hasmonean family, then says this caused a group of Hasideans to join under Mattathias's revolt and provide needing backing.

Then a group of scribes appeared in a body before Alcimus and Bacchides to ask for just terms. The Hasideans were first among the Israelites to seek peace from them, for they said, 'A priest of the line of Aaron has come with the army, and he will not harm us.' Alcimus spoke peaceable words to them and swore this oath to them, 'We will not seek to injure you or your friends.' So they trusted him; but he seized sixty of them and killed them in one day (...) Then the fear and dread of them fell on all the people, for they said, 'There is no truth or justice in them, for they have violated the agreement and the oath that they swore.'

— 1 Maccabees 7:12-16, 18

A second passage in chapter 7 happens after the appointment of Alcimus as the new High Priest of Israel by the new Seleucid King Demetrius I Soter. This was in a later phase of the struggle, around 161 BCE, when the Seleucids had repealed the most onerous of the anti-Jewish decrees and were working to restore calm to the restive province. Alcimus appears to have moderated the worst of his predecessor's actions and reached out to restore loyalty to the government. However, the Maccabee rebels continued to press for full autonomy, and despised Alcimus as a collaborator and traitor. The author of 1 Maccabees portrays Alcimus as grudgingly effective at luring some to his side ("all who were troubling their people joined him [Alcimus]"), but considered his arguments to trust the Seleucid government deception and lies, and uses the incident above to prove their point. The author makes clear his stance that these Hasideans were being fooled; working with the government will only get you betrayed and killed, and the only justifiable stand is to work with the Hasmonean family for full autonomy and independence. This passage also implicitly associates the Hasideans with the scribes (Soferim), saying that both were negotiating terms with Alcimus.

But he [Alcimus] found an opportunity that furthered his mad purpose when he was invited by Demetrius to a meeting of the council and was asked about the attitude and intentions of the Jews. He answered: 'Those of the Jews who are called Hasideans, whose leader is Judas Maccabeus, are keeping up war and stirring up sedition, and will not let the kingdom attain tranquility. (...) For as long as Judas lives, it is impossible for the government to find peace.'

— 2 Maccabees 14:5-6, 10

The book 2 Maccabees appears to use the term differently than how 1 Maccabees does. In it, Alcimus, in explaining the situation in Judea to King Demetrius, calls Judas Maccabeus the leader of the Asidaioi. This contrasts with 1 Maccabees 7, where they are clearly not followers of Judas, but rather are naively welcoming to Alcimus. While it is possible that these books are describing a split among the Hasideans with some following Judas and others not, the favored explanation by scholars is that in 2 Maccabees, the term simply means "the faithful" in the sense of traditionalist Jews in general, and not a specific group. The reference also should be taken carefully, as the author has made it part of Alcimus's argument, but Alcimus is also a liar according to the book. At the least, the author certainly intends the reader to think that Alcimus is lying about Judas being the source of the troubles in Judea, so him being a wicked informer and smearing the "real" Hasideans by claiming the troublemaker Judas is their leader is also a possibility.

== Nature and character ==
Loosely speaking, there are three main branches to take with these references to the Hasideans as to who they were.

=== Unorganized faithful ===
The simplest option is to deny that the Hasideans were a coherent group at all. In this case, 1 Maccabees was merely expressing that some of the "faithful" of Israel joined with Mattathias, and other "faithful" were content to negotiate with Alcimus (if unwisely according to the author of 1 Maccabees). They would not be greatly distinguished from any other traditionalist Jews.

Daniel R. Schwartz notes that 1 Maccabees 2:42 has significant textual variants between the oldest manuscripts. The Codex Alexandrinus, the Vulgate Latin translation, and Syriac translations read "Hasideans" (Ἀσιδαῖων, Asidaíon); however, the Codex Sinaiticus, the Venetus, and Old Latin translations only read "Judeans" (Ιουδαίων, Ioudaíon) instead. Schwartz prefers the "Judeans" reading which would eliminate mention of the Hasideans there entirely, and suggests that a translator from Hebrew to Greek may have simply erred when choosing to transliterate the Hebrew hasidim as if it were a proper name, or some other scribal meddling.

=== A group of zealous warriors ===
Another option is to consider them a group who indeed took the proper name hasidim or a variant thereof, but a group largely in sync with Judas Maccabeus and the Hasmoneans, if possibly extra-pious. In this version, the Hasideans were a distinct group that allied with Judas early and remained so during the revolt. The incident described in 1 Maccabees 7 was not a major split or philosophical difference, but a tactical one. The Maccabees had been crushingly defeated at the Battle of Beth Zechariah in 162 BCE, had declined to interfere with Bacchides' campaign in 161 BCE, and were likely still rebuilding. The Hasideans had been true allies of Judas, but some of them had hoped to negotiate for concessions and relief thinking Alcimus a moderate, and the government used the opportunity to execute those who showed up. Still, in this scenario, the government was correct in perceiving the Hasideans as opponents. Judas declined to negotiate personally, deciding it was not good to negotiate from a position of weakness, and he would need to win again on the battlefield before a longer-term peace could be secured. In this view, the incident proved him correct: negotiations undertaken before the rebels held more ground would only result in their defeat.

=== Jewish moderates ===
The third option is to see the Hasideans as a group but with a distinctly different ideology than the Hasmoneans; the passage in 1 Maccabees 7 was recording a genuine difference in goals. In this view, the Hasideans were deeply religious but comparative "moderates" as their chief concern was the repeal of Antiochus IV's decrees forbidding Jewish practices. They had joined with Judas earlier due to the anti-Jewish persecution and their anger at the corruption of High Priest Menelaus. After these decrees were repealed in 163–162 BCE, however, fighting a full-scale rebellion against the Seleucid government was no longer seen as needed. The hated High Priest Menelaus was executed around 162 BCE. This explains how Alcimus was able to lure some Hasideans to his side: by offering a return to the status quo ante and peace, when Judaism was accepted but the authority of the Seleucid government was unchallenged. While the above two views largely take 1 Maccabees at its word (if differing on what those words imply), this view can take into account more skeptical stances that distrust 1 Maccabees as a partisan, pro-Hasmonean source. To continue the revolt, the Hasmoneans had to convince the moderates that the Seleucids were evil and to be hated; they were a looming threat that could not be ignored. A story such as the one seen in Chapter 7, where the perfidious Alcimus executes even supposed moderates and breaks his oaths, would fit perfectly into the Hasmonean ideology that the only sure path for Judea was to unite under the Hasmonean banner. As such, the details cannot be trusted to be historical in this view, with the Hasmoneans potentially exaggerating or misrepresenting a real incident to become a symbol of Seleucid untrustworthiness.

=== Problems of historiography ===
An alternative approach is to be modest on what can be known. Some historians believe that there is simply nothing to say about the Hasideans until more information than the three passages we have is discovered. John J. Collins was disdainful of the hypothesizing done by other scholars; he wrote in 1977 that the Hasideans "had grown in recent scholarship from an extremely poorly attested entity to the great Jewish alternative to the Maccabees at the time of the revolt. There has been no corresponding growth in the evidence."

== Later influence ==
The origin and tenets of the Hasideans remain obscure. So too is their later influence, if any. The historian Josephus describes three groups active in Hasmonean politics by 100 BCE: the mainstream and Hasmonean-skeptical Pharisees, the Hasmonean-supporting and influential among the upper classes Sadducees, and the outright anti-Hasmonean Essenes. Heinrich Grätz supposes that after the Maccabean victories, the Hasideans retired into obscurity, being dissatisfied with Judas Maccabeus, and eventually became the order of the Essenes. The theory is supported by linguistic similarity between the Greek term for the Essenes, Essēnoi or Essaioi (Ἐσσηνοά, Ἐσσαῖοι), and the East Aramaic / Syriac Ḥăsayin / Ḥăsayyâ, the Aramaic equivalent of the Hebrew "Ḥasidim", although this claimed similarity is contested by other scholars. Others, such as Emil Schürer and John Kampen, think that the Pharisees developed from the Ḥasidieans.

== Hasideans and the Book of Daniel ==
The Book of Daniel is generally agreed to have been written at some point during the persecutions of Antiochus IV Epiphanes, around 167–165 BCE. Compared to the more secular stance of 1 Maccabees that advocated direct military action under the leadership of the Hasmonean family, Daniel appears to have a more spiritual and apocalyptic approach to the crisis, suggesting that God would directly intervene to punish the Seleucids. It appears to suggest more of a passive resistance and praises martyrdom; thus, the most important thing for the faithful was to remain 'pure' in their Judaism to maintain God's favor. For example, the book features stories of Daniel and his friends refusing a mandate to eat King Nebuchadnezzar's rich food and eating a diet of vegetables instead, and emerging all the healthier from it: presumably an encouragement to keep Jewish dietary law in the Maccabean era despite pressure from the government. One common point of speculation is that the author of Daniel was a member of the Hasideans, or at least a good example of how the Hasideans thought. Scholars favoring this include Martin Hengel, Victor Tcherikover, and James A. Montgomery. Others are skeptical of the claimed connection; if the passage in 1 Maccabees 2 about the Hasideans being "mighty warriors" is accurate, that would not appear to align with Daniel's ideology.
