= Battle of Beth Zur =

164 BC battle between the Maccabees and the Seleucids

Coordinates: 31.5894°N 35.0942°E

- Part of the Maccabean Revolt
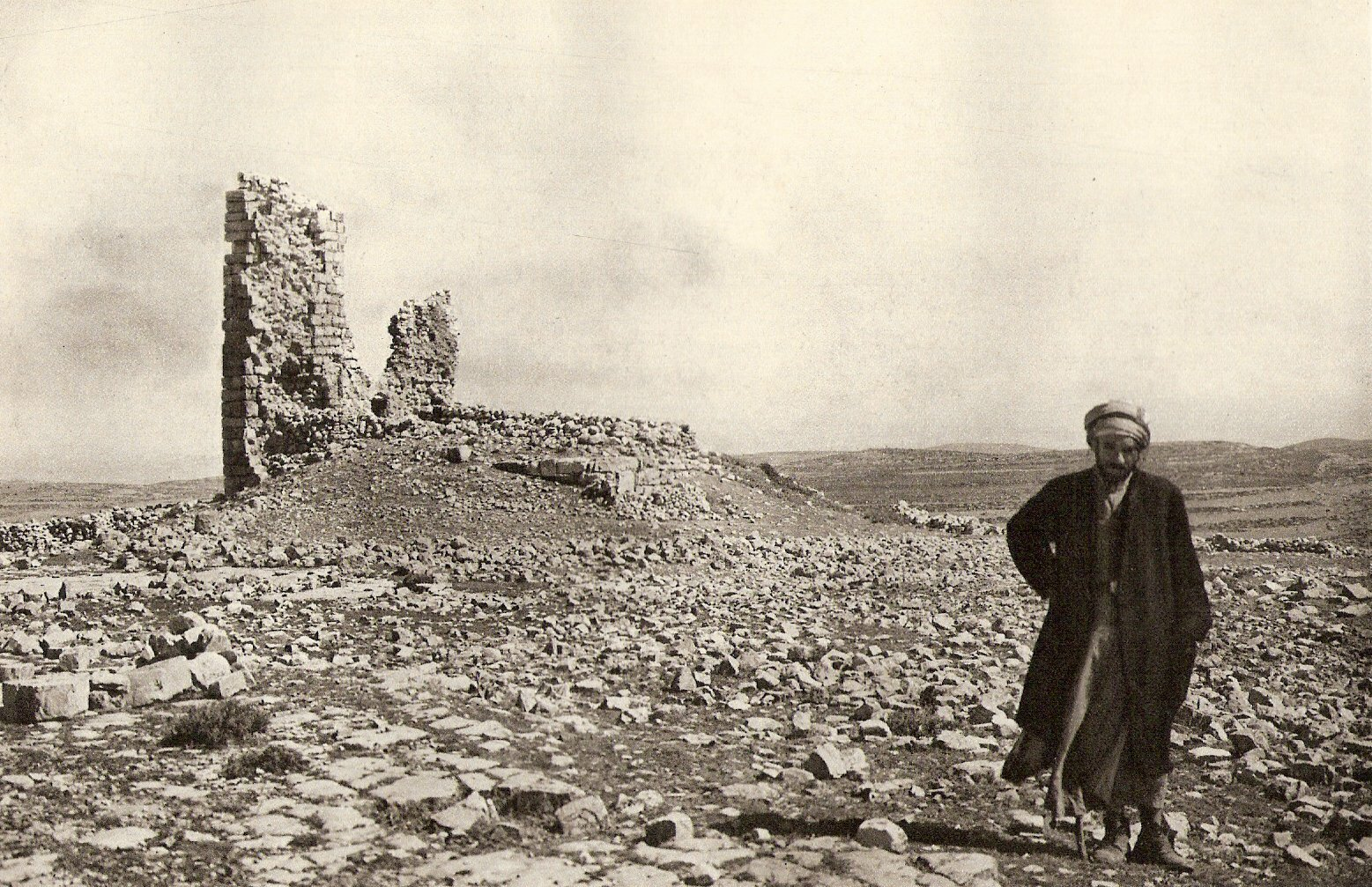
- The Ruins of Beth Zur, early 20th century
Date	October 164 BC
Location	near Beth Zur, just north of Hebron
Result	Jewish victory

Belligerents
Maccabean rebels	Seleucid Empire

Commanders and leaders
Judas Maccabeus	Lysias

Strength
10,000	Unknown (see #Analysis)

Casualties and losses
Unknown	Unknown (see #Analysis)

The Battle of Beth Zur was fought between the Maccabees led by Judas Maccabeus (Judah Maccabee) and a Seleucid Greek army led by Regent Lysias in October 164 BC at Beth Zur. According to the books of Maccabees, the rebels won the battle, although how significant this victory really was is disputed; it is possible the battle's result was inconclusive. Through a stroke of good fortune for the rebels, the days after the battle likely coincided with news of Seleucid King Antiochus IV Epiphanes's death reaching Judea; rather than continue the campaign, the Seleucid army and Lysias returned to the capital to handle the leadership transition. The Maccabees were able to capture Jerusalem soon after.

== Primary sources ==
The Battle of Beth Zur is recorded in the books of 1 Maccabees (1 Maccabees 4:26–35), 2 Maccabees (2 Maccabees 11:1–15), and Josephus's Antiquities of the Jews Book 12, Chapter 7. The main point of divergence is timing: according to 1 Maccabees, Lysias initiated an expedition, was defeated at Beth Zur, Jerusalem was taken, the Second Temple was cleansed, Lysias makes a second expedition around 162 BC, and Beth Zur is again besieged by the Seleucids in the second expedition. Contrary to 1 Maccabees, 2 Maccabees indicates Lysias's expedition and the Battle of Beth Zur happened after the taking of Jerusalem and the purification of the Temple; this has caused some scholars such as Daniel R. Schwartz to believe that Lysias only made a single expedition to Judea, rather than the account in 1 Maccabees of two expeditions separated by two years. Still, the default stance of many historians of the revolt has been to prefer the 1 Maccabees version of events, as the author was writing closer in time to the events and was seemingly an eyewitness to at least part of the Revolt; additionally, some of the documents reproduced in 2 Maccabees seem to support the chronology of 1 Maccabees, as does the Book of Daniel.

Josephus largely echoes 1 Maccabees, his main source, but adds that the Maccabees clashed with only the advance troops of the Seleucids, a reasonable and plausible addition.

== Background ==
Toward the end of the summer of 165 BC, King Antiochus IV Epiphanes gathered forces from the western part of his empire to leave for an expedition to the eastern satrapies in Babylonia and Persia. There, he intended to stay awhile, replace or do battle with rebellious governors, deter the growing Parthian Empire from invading, and restore a flow of taxes to the capital. He left Lysias in charge as regent in the Seleucid capital Antioch and to raise his young son, the future Antiochus V. A Seleucid expedition to Judea was repelled in 165 BC, however, after the Maccabees won the Battle of Emmaus. The Western half of the Seleucid Empire was still deprived of many dependable Greek soldiers due to Antiochus IV's expedition to the eastern satrapies, so it appears that Lysias negotiated with the rebels for 6–9 months during the fall and winter of 165 BC and early 164 BC. Some of the documents recorded in 2 Maccabees may be communications from the time period, as Lysias offers a range of offers to placate the Maccabees. Historian Bezalel Bar-Kochva offers tentative suggestions for dates of the document in 2 Maccabees 11:16–21 (summary of the beginning of negotiations) and 2 Maccabees 11:34–38 (negotiations with the Romans) being from late 165 BC, and 2 Maccabees 11:27–33 being from spring of 164 BC, a conditional amnesty offered at the request of High Priest Menelaus.

However, it seems negotiations fell through, possibly after being rejected by Antiochus IV after messengers informed him of the Maccabees' demands. Lysias marshaled an army to restore order in the Judean countryside. His forces camped at Beth Zur, a fortified place near Jerusalem.

== Battle ==
Little is known of the details of the battle. It appears that the Judean forces engaged in a hit-and-run raid style attack where the rebels charged a portion of the camp in a dramatic clash, but both sides withdrew in good order afterward - the Seleucids to link up with their main force, while the Jews to avoid having to fight the rest of the Seleucid army.

== Aftermath ==
According to the First Book of Maccabees, the stirring victory convinced Lysias to return to Antioch to replenish his forces after sustaining heavy casualties. This account is somewhat distrusted as fitting the narrative that the pro-Hasmonean source would want to tell, however. More skeptical historians suspect that the battle was inconclusive based on the description given. The victory at Beth Zur would possibly have been a minor skirmish had Lysias been able to continue his campaign, but he was not. The death of Antiochus IV made it imperative that Lysias, now regent for the entire empire, be in the capital Antioch with as many military units loyal to him as possible so as to stave off any succession challenges to the new boy king Antiochus V Eupator, who was only 9 years old. As such, regardless of how many casualties the Maccabees inflicted at Beth Zur, he had to withdraw and cede the field to the rebels. Similarly, the Maccabees may have intentionally declined to attempt to conquer Jerusalem earlier in the knowledge that doing so would have provoked a fierce response from Antiochus IV. The resulting succession struggle enabled the Maccabees time to establish new "facts on the ground" by taking Jerusalem, cleansing the Temple, and making clear they were in control of Judea, although they did not challenge the Acra immediately with its garrison of Greeks and Hellenist-friendly Jews.

== Analysis ==
Historians distrust the figures given to the size of the Seleucid army in 1 Maccabees and 2 Maccabees as implausibly large. 1 Maccabees claims that the Seleucids had 60,000 infantry and 5,000 horsemen, while 2 Maccabees claims it was 80,000 infantry and "all" of their cavalry; these numbers seemingly exceed the troops available even during an unrealistic mass mobilization of all of the troops in the western half of the Seleucid Empire, even ignoring that many troops had been sent east with Antiochus IV. An army that size would also have been a logistics nightmare to feed in the Judean hillside. Still, as Lysias was the regent, the Seleucid force was surely quite large and likely larger than the force sent during the Battle of Emmaus a year prior, just not to the degree depicted in the books. In the same way, the casualty figures are likely too high; 1 Maccabees claims 5,000 Seleucid soldiers fell in battle, and 2 Maccabees claims 11,000 Seleucid soldiers fell. 1 Maccabees does not describe the Seleucid army collapsing in a panic-driven retreat, though, the likely result of such catastrophic casualties had they truly been inflicted.

== Angelic ally of the Maccabees ==
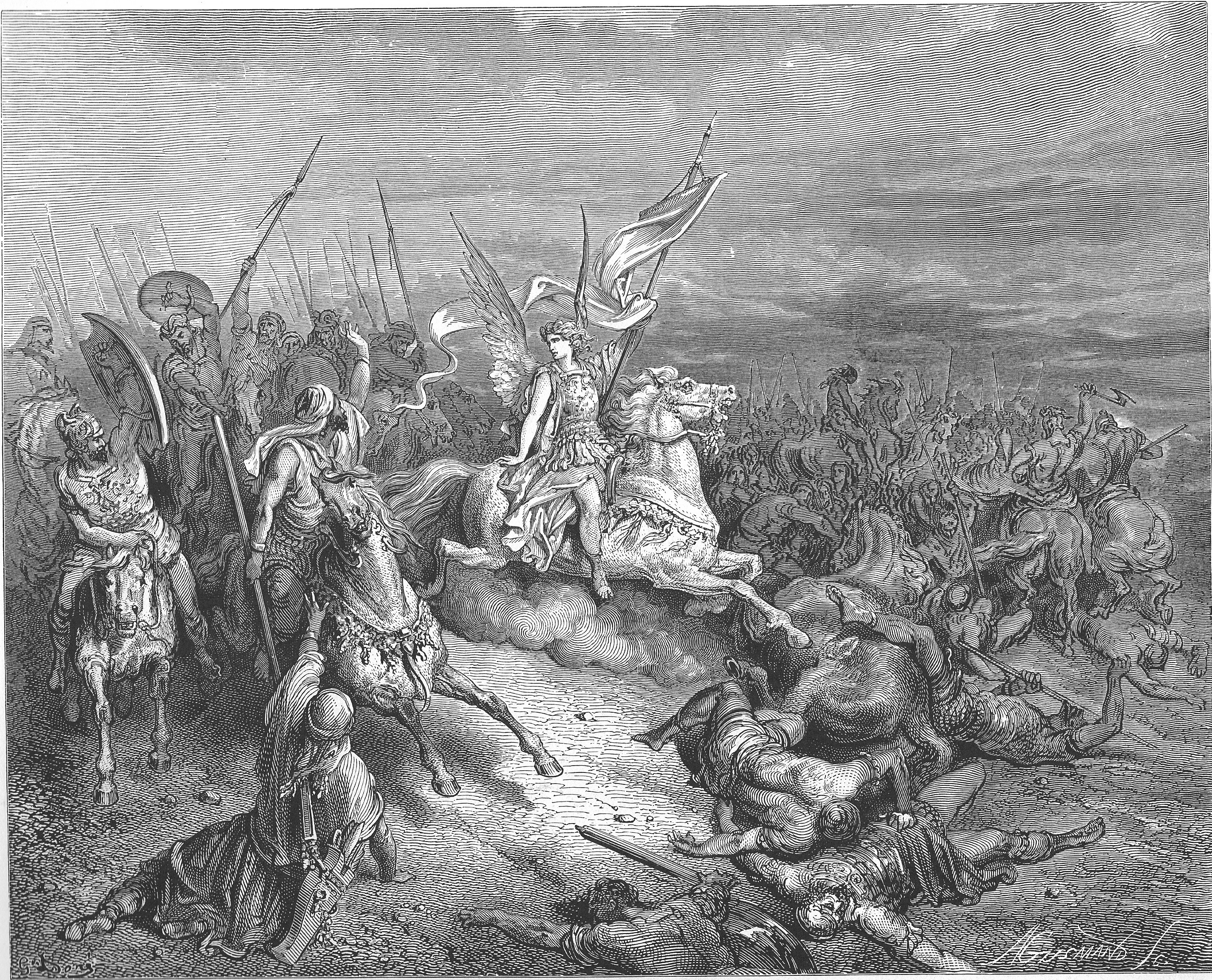
An angel aids the Maccabees (illustration by Gustave Doré in 1866)

When Maccabeus and his men got word that Lysias was besieging the strongholds, they and all the people, with lamentations and tears, prayed the Lord to send a good angel to save Israel. (...) And there, while they were still near Jerusalem, a horseman appeared at their head, clothed in white and brandishing weapons of gold. And together they all praised the merciful God, and were strengthened in heart, ready to assail not only humans but the wildest animals or walls of iron. They advanced in battle order, having their heavenly ally, for the Lord had mercy on them.

— 2 Maccabees 11:6, 8–10 (NRSV)

According to 2 Maccabees, God directly sent an angel armed with weapons of gold to aid the Maccabees. Since 1 Maccabees does not mention an event such as a mysterious helper that surely the pro-Hasmonean author of the book would have eagerly proclaimed had it had any basis, the claim is not considered historical. Still, it proved a popular motif for art and literature afterward. It appears in the "Book of Dreams" in the Book of Enoch, chapters 83-90 (the Animal Apocalypse), where the angel both joins the battle and records the event.

== Bibliography ==
- Bar-Kochva, Bezalel (1989). Judas Maccabaeus: The Jewish Struggle Against the Seleucids. Cambridge University Press. p. 275–290. ISBN 0521323525.
