= Megillat Antiochus =

Scroll about the story of Hanukkah

Megillat Antiochus (Hebrew: מגילת אנטיוכוס, "Scroll of Antiochus"), also known as Megillat HaHashmonaim, Megillat Benei Hashmonai, Megillat Hanukkah, Megillat Yoḥanan, Megillat HaMakabim, or Megillah Yevanit, recounts the story of Hanukkah and the history of the victory of the Maccabees (or Hasmoneans) over the Hellenistic Seleucid Empire.

It is distinct from the Books of the Maccabees, which describe some of the same events. Louis Ginzberg called it a "spurious work" based on "unhistorical sources," with the exception of its citations taken from passages from First Book of the Maccabees.

== History ==
Early versions of the work exist in both Aramaic and Hebrew. The Hebrew version is a literal translation of the original scroll, which was written in Judeo-Babylonian Aramaic. It is written in a formal style that apes that of the Targum Onkelos. It was written between the 2nd and 5th centuries CE—most likely in the 2nd century. The Hebrew version dates to the 7th century. The author’s identity and reason for writing the Megillah are unknown, but some authorities have suggested that it was written to promote observance of Hanukkah in Lower Mesopotamia ("Babylonia") at a time when Karaite Judaism was rising.

The work was first mentioned by Simeon Kayyara (c. 743 CE), who wrote in the Halakhot Gedolot that the scroll was compiled by the "elders of the School of Shammai and the elders of the School of Hillel". Saadia Gaon (882‒942) said that it was composed in Aramaic by the Hasmonaeans themselves as Megillat Beit Hashmonai. Saadia Gaon focused on Megillat Antiochus due to its relevance in the rabbinic discourse with the Karaites of his time. The Karaites rejected the oral traditions of Rabbinic Judaism and, consequently, did not observe Hanukkah. He translated it into Judeo-Arabic in the 9th century. He goes so far as to cite verse 23 as a proof text in his work Sefer HaGalui.

Likely due to Saadia Gaon's influence, Megillat Antiochus found widespread use by Jewish communities across Spain, Italy, France, Germany, Yemen, and Persia. Many manuscripts and early printed editions of the Hebrew Bible include this text indicating it was regarded almost as canonical by some Jewish communities, who had to be warned not to say a blessing before its reading on Hanukkah. Dozens of copies have been found in the Cairo Genizah.

The original Aramaic text can be found in an old Baladi-rite prayer book from 17th-century Yemen. The Hebrew text was first published in 1557 in the Duchy of Mantua in northern Italy.

== Summary ==
The scroll begins with a description of the greatness and power of Antiochus, who was mighty and victorious, and built Antioch, a city on the seacoast. His general Bagras also founded a city beyond Antioch and named it after himself.

In the twenty-third year of his reign, Antiochus determined to begin the religious war against the Jews. To that end he sent to Jerusalem his general Nicanor, who raged furiously against the pious Jews, and set up an idol in the Temple in Jerusalem. When John Gaddi, High Priest of Israel, saw this, he appeared before Nicanor's house and demanded entrance. Admitted to Nicanor's presence, he declared himself willing to comply with the king's demand and offer a sacrifice to the idol. He expressed the wish, however, that all present should leave the house since he feared that if the Jews heard of his deed, he would be stoned. When left alone with Nicanor, John thrust into the general's heart the dagger that he had concealed under his garments.

After this, John waged a victorious war against the Greeks. As a memorial of his great deed, he erected a column with the inscription "Maccabee, the Slayer of the Mighty." Antiochus now sent his general Bagras (a distorted form of the name Bacchides), who at first killed Jews for observing their religious precepts. He was eventually compelled by the five sons of Mattathias to flee. He boarded a vessel and set sail for Antioch. When, for the second time, he moved with a mighty army against the Jews, he was not more successful. The five sons of Mattathias opposed him bravely, and although Judas and Eleazar lost their lives, the Jews were triumphant. Their success was in no small measure due to the aged Mattathias, who, after the fall of Judas, himself undertook the guidance of the battle. This third battle was also the last, for Bagras was burned by the Jews, and Antiochus, after a revolt of his subjects, fled to Anatolia and drowned himself.

The Jews then purified the Second Temple. They were fortunate enough to find clean oil, which was needed for the holy lights, and although the quantity seemed sufficient for one day only, it lasted miraculously for eight days. For this reason, the Maccabees instituted the eight-day Ḥanukkah feast.

== Chronology ==
There are marked differences between the events described in Megillat Antiochus and other contemporary records, including the Books of Maccabees and the writings of Josephus. The Jewish Encyclopedia commented in its entry: "That Antioch is mentioned as a coast city; that John, with the surname "Maccabee," is called a high priest; and that the reign of Antiochus is said to have lasted twenty-three years, all go to prove that the Megillah is a spurious work of fairly recent times."

The Scroll of Antiochus equates the 23rd year of the reign of Antiochus Eupator with the 213th year since the building of the Second Temple. According to Josephus, Antiochus Eupator began his reign in the year 149 of the Seleucid Era, corresponding to 162 BCE, making the 23rd year of his reign 139 BCE. Since, according to the Scroll of Antiochus, the Second Temple had by that time been standing 213 years, this would mean that the Second Temple was completed in 352 BCE.

This date matches traditional Jewish sources, which say that the Second Temple stood 420 years, before being destroyed in the 2nd year of the reign of Vespasian, in 68 CE. However, modern scholarship places the building of the Second Temple in 516 BCE, based on chronologies that emerge from the Babylonian Chronicles.

== Use in ritual ==
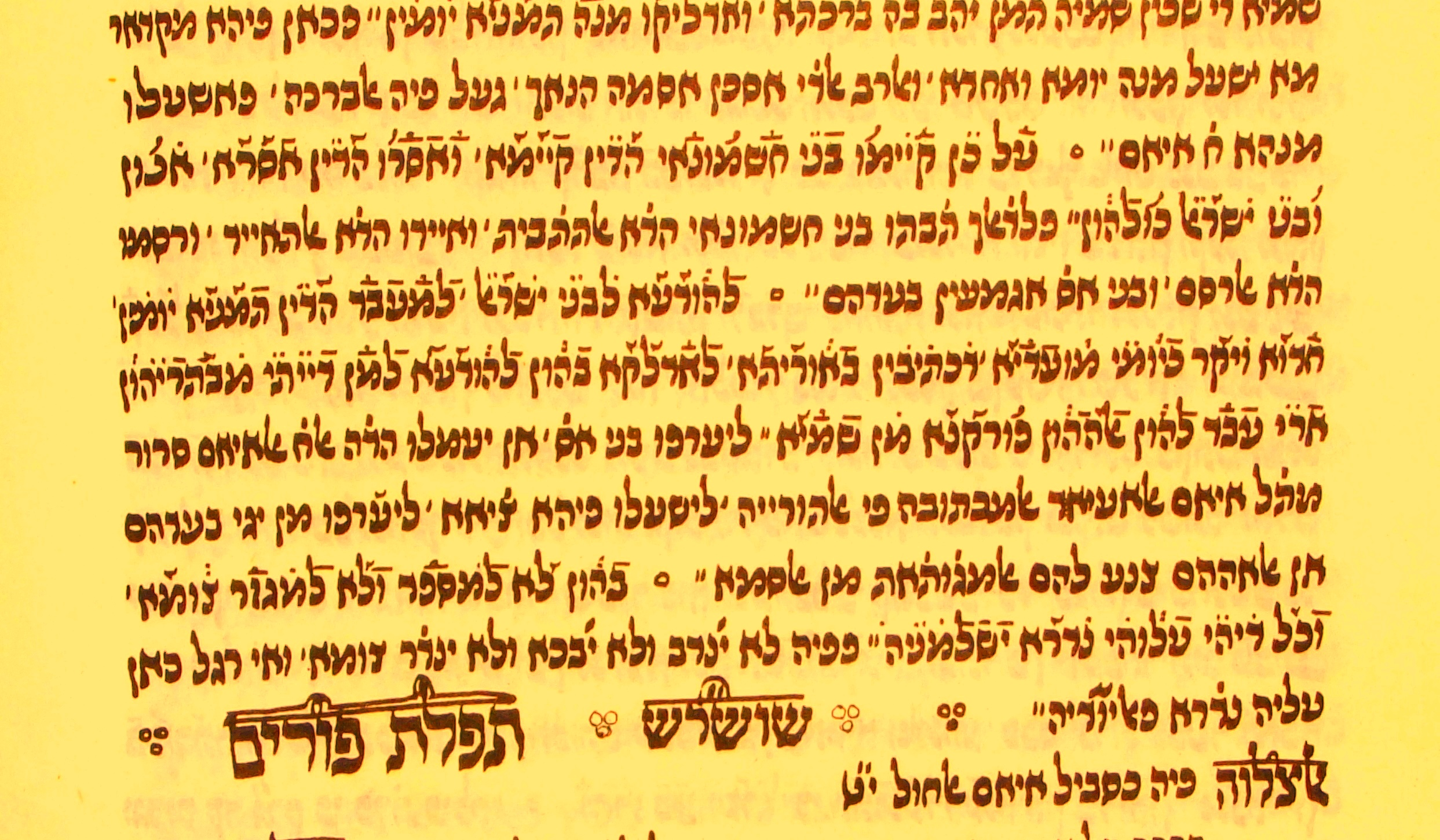
Section from the Aramaic Scroll of Antiochus with Babylonian vocalization and Arabic targum

During the Middle Ages Megillat Antiochus was read in Italian-rite synagogues on Shabbat Hanukkah. A machzor of the Kaffa rite from the year 1735 said to read Megillat Antiochus during Mincha of Shabbat Hanukkah. Baladi-rite Yemeni Jews had a custom of reading the scroll after the haftarah reading on Shabbat Hanukkah.

The Hebrew text with an English translation is in the 1949 Ha-Siddur Ha-Shalem by Philip Birnbaum, which is used in many English-speaking Orthodox and Conservative synagogues.
