= Timarchus =

2nd-century BCE Greek usurper of Seleucid Media

- "Great King" (Basileus Megas)
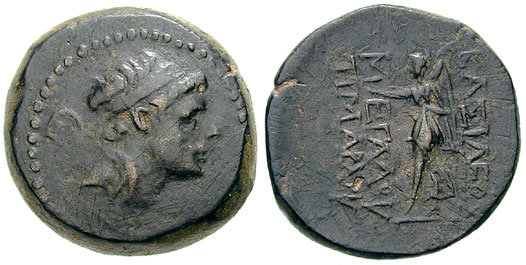
- Coin of Timarchus. Reverse shows Nike. The Greek inscription reads Basileos Megalou Timarchou (of Great King Timarchus).

Usurper King of the Seleucid Empire
- Reign: 163–160 BC
- Predecessor: Regent Lysias
- Successor: King Demetrius I Soter
- Born: Possibly Miletus (modern-day Balat, Didim, Aydın, Turkey)
- Died: 160 BC

Timarchus (Greek: Τίμαρχος, Tímarchos) also known as Timarch, was a Greek noble and a satrap of the Seleucid Empire during the reign of his ally King Antiochus IV Epiphanes. After Antiochus IV's death, he styled himself an independent ruler in his domain in the Persian east of the Empire from around 163–160 BC, and may have even sought to entirely usurp leadership of the entire empire. He gained an alliance with the Roman Republic, which sought to weaken the Seleucid Empire by promoting internal divisions; both Rome and Timarchus distrusted the new king Demetrius I. Demetrius rode east and defeated Timarchus in 160 BC, ending his short reign.

== Biography ==
=== Early years ===
A Greek nobleman, possibly from Miletus in Asia Minor, Timarchus was a friend of the Seleucid prince Antiochus IV Epiphanes during his time as a hostage to the Roman Republic. He was appointed satrap of Media in western Iran when Antiochus IV Epiphanes became king in 175 BC, and his brother Heracleides became minister of the royal finances. The Persian part of the empire was threatened by the Parthian kingdom, and Timarchus probably spent much of his time reinforcing the defenses. The Seleucid realms probably extended as far as the area of Teheran during this time.

=== Short reign and defeat ===
In the turmoil following the death of Antiochus IV during a Persian campaign in 164 BC, Timarchus became the more or less independent ruler of Media, opposing the general Lysias who acted as steward for the infant king Antiochus V Eupator, son of Antiochus IV.

In 162 BC Demetrius I returned from exile and became king. Demetrius's claim to the Seleucid throne was generally considered stronger than the claim of his now dead uncle Antiochus IV and by extension his young son Antiochus V. Demetrius promptly executed Lysias and Antiochus V upon taking power. This may well have been the provocation that caused Timarchus to take the final step to independence and declare himself king.

Timarchus now managed to extend his realm into Babylonia, where records of his reign were inscribed into the astronomical calendars. His forces were however not enough to stand against the rival Seleucid king: Demetrius defeated and killed Timarchus in 160 BC, and the Seleucid empire was temporarily united again.

=== Legacy ===
Timarchus was one of the last Hellenistic kings in Iran but little is known of his reign, except the short - and stereotypical - notion by Appian that Timarchus was a tyrant. Appian's brief mention is treated with skepticism by most scholars. On his coins, Timarchus introduced the epithet "Great King" (Basileus Megas) which was the traditional Achaemenid title and may reflect an effort to gather support from the natives in a time when the Seleucid empire lost ground in Iran. He was inspired by the Bactrian king Eucratides the Great, who had taken the same assuming title a few years earlier.

Timarchus was survived and avenged by his brother Heracleides, who eventually became champion of Alexander Balas, a boy who he claimed was a natural son of Antiochus IV. Heracleides convinced the Roman Senate to support the young pretender against Demetrius, who was defeated and killed in 150 BC. The family of Timarchus thus got its revenge for him. The continued in-fighting between rival Seleucid claimants for power is referred to as the Seleucid Dynastic Wars. These civil wars fatally weakened the empire and saw it shrink and crumble over the next decades.

== See also ==
- Timeline of Syrian history

== Sources ==
- Appian, Syriaka (The Syrian Wars) 8:§§ 45,47
- Biography of Parthian king Mithradates I (a contemporary of Timarchus)

Timarchus Unknown house
Preceded by Antiochus V Eupator	Seleucid King (King of Syria); 163–160 BC with Antiochus V Eupator (163–161 BC); Demetrius I Soter (161–150 BC)	Succeeded by Demetrius I
