= Beth-zur =

Biblical site in the West Bank

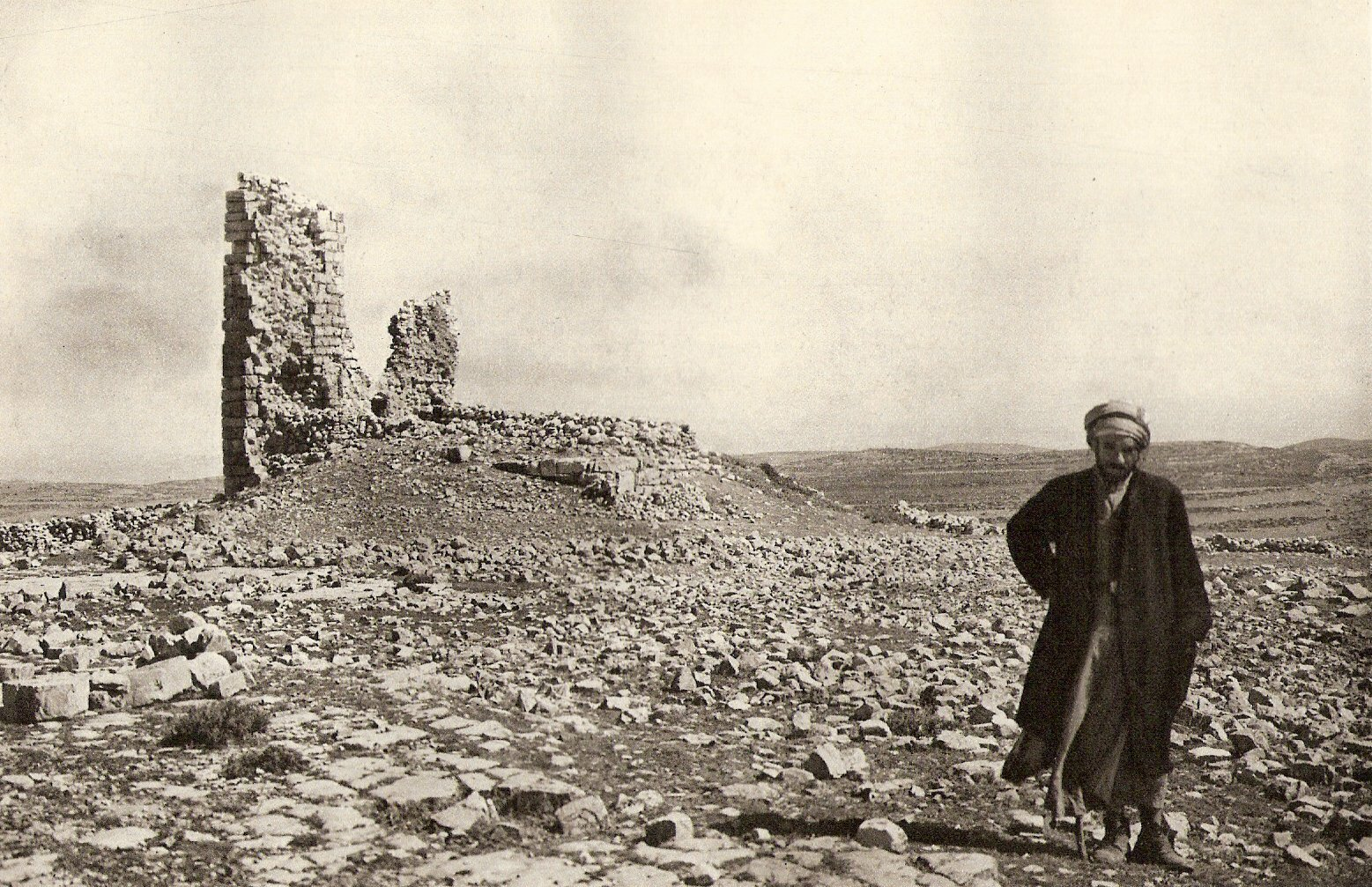
- Ruins of medieval tower at Khirbet Burj as-Sur, near biblical Beth-zur, 1920s

- Location within the West Bank
- 31.58333°N 35.1°E
- Location: West Bank

Site notes
- Archaeologists: O.R. Sellers

Beth-Zur (also Beit Tzur, Bethsura) is a biblical site of historic and archaeological importance in the mountains of Hebron in southern Judea, now part of the West Bank. Beth Zur is mentioned several times in the Hebrew Bible and the writings of the Roman Jewish historian Josephus. The Battle of Beth-Zur took place here in 164 BCE.

Beth-Zur has been identified with the site of Khirbet et-Tubeiqa, near Khirbet Burj as-Sur.

The historian Josephus places the distance between Beth-zur and Beit Zechariah at 70 stadia.

== Etymology ==
The name Beth-Zur means "house of rock" or (less likely) "house of the god Zur". A person named Beth Zur is mentioned in 1 Chronicles (1 Chronicles 2:45). The Israeli settlement of Karmei Tzur was named after the biblical town, founded in 1984 just 2 km north-east.

== History ==
=== Early Bronze Age ===
O.R. Sellers, excavating at Khirbet et-Tubeiqa in 1957, discovered that the site was first settled at the end of the third millennium BCE.

=== Middle Bronze Age ===
==== Middle Bronze IIB-C ====
It was fortified, like many other Canaanite cities, during the Middle Bronze Age IIB in the 18th–17th centuries BCE.

=== Iron Age ===
The settlement continued into the Iron Age.

==== Iron II ====
During Iron II, this region came under the Kingdom of Judah.

=== Classical Age ===
==== Persian period ====
A rare coin inscribed "the governor Hezekiah" attests to the existence of Beth-Zur during the Persian period. The original inscription is yhzqyh hphh, 'Yehezqiyah ha-pechah' (Yehezqiyah the governor), and the coin might also be from the time when Persian rule was replaced by the Ptolemaic.

==== Hellenistic period ====
Betsoura, as the Greeks called the town, reached a peak of prosperity during the Hellenistic period. A citadel was built at Betsoura during the 3rd century BCE, when a series of wars between the Seleucid Empire and the Ptolemaic Kingdom of Egypt rocked the region.

In 164 BC, during the Maccabean Revolt, the Battle of Beth-Zur was fought here. The site's importance lay in its strategic location on a hilltop dominating the highway, preventing the approach of a hostile army from the Valley of Elah to the Judean plateau. Josephus describes Beth-Zur as the mightiest stronghold in Judea.

The battle was the confrontation between the Seleucid Greek general Lysias and the Maccabees, led by Judas Maccabeus, resulting in the defeat of Lysias and his forces. This victory was followed by the recapture of Jerusalem by the Maccabees. The key to the battle was the exploitation of the natural terrain and fortifications.

Once victorious, Judas rebuilt the old Middle Bronze Age ramparts and the more recent citadel. The fortified town then changed hands repeatedly until regaining the peaceful character lost during the Maccabean Wars, under the reign of John Hyrcanus (r. 134–104 BCE). As the Hasmonean expanded the territory fourther south, Beth Sur became less prominent as a border fortress. However, by 100 BCE the town had been fully abandoned.

==== Roman period ====
Beth-Zur was inhabited in the lifetimes of Eusebius (260/265–339/340), who mentions it as the village of Bethsoro (Onomasticon 52:2), and of Jerome.

=== Crusader period ===
Khirbet Burj as-Sur, the medieval site at Beth-Zur, has the Palestine grid coordinates 1594.1104. The ruins of a tower stand near the main road between Jerusalem and Hebron, approximately 4 miles north of Hebron. The western wall, the most visible remnant of the building, is standing to a height of 9.5 m. Beithsur or Bethsura, as the Crusaders called Beth-Zur, was given in 1136 to the Hospitallers by the lord of Hebron.

== Hebrew Bible ==
Beth-Zur is mentioned in Joshua as being near Halhul and Gedor, in the Judean hill country (Josh 15:58). According to the same verse, it was part of the territory of the Tribe of Judah. 1 Chronicles, on the other hand, associates the town with Caleb (1 Chronicles 2:42–50).

2 Chronicles credits Rehoboam with its fortification (2 Chr 11:7). The prophet Nehemiah is said to have been the "ruler of half the district of Beth-zur".(Neh 3:16).

During the 2nd-century BCE Jewish struggle against the Seleucid Empire, Beth-zur was a tactical hub (see Battle of Beth-Zur in 164 BCE) due to its stratgic position on the road between Hebron and Jerusalem, featured prominently in both 1 Maccabees (focus on the military tactics) and 2 Maccabees (focus on the theological/political aspect).

== Popular culture ==
The existentialist author Jean-Paul Sartre wrote a play set in Beth-zur while he was prisoner in a Nazi concentration camp, called Bariona or the Son of Thunder. It narrates the story of a Jewish village that lost faith just before Jesus Christ was born.
