= Lysias (Syrian chancellor) =

Regent of the Seleucid Empire
- Reign: 163–162 BC
- Predecessor: Antiochus IV Epiphanes
- Successor: Demetrius I Soter
- King and ward: Antiochus V Eupator
- Died: 162 BC

Lysias (/ˈlɪsiəs/; Greek: Λυσίας; Hebrew: ליזיאש; died 162 BC) was a 2nd-century BC general and governor of Syria under the Seleucid Empire.

== Biography ==
The Seleucid Empire of the 2nd century BC was huge; it possessed two heartlands, the capital at Antioch in Syria, and a secondary capital at Babylon in Mesopotamia. Seleucid rulers had to aggressively remind their client rulers of their loyalty lest the client rulers drift towards independence, as happened with various subkingdoms over time. King Antiochus IV Epiphanes left Antioch around summer of 165 BC on an expedition to the eastern satrapies; he would see to affairs in Babylonia, dismiss corrupt or overly independent officials, and attempt to exercise control over the drifting Persian provinces to what would become the Parthian Empire. Antiochus IV left Lysias in charge of the government of the Western half of the empire as regent. Lysias also took guardianship of Antiochus's son who continued to be raised in Antioch. Antiochus then went east with a loyal Greek army into Babylonia and Persia to collect the revenues which were not coming in satisfactorily.

Lysias is largely remembered due to his involvement in the Maccabean Revolt, as Jewish records of this would be preserved in a way that Seleucid records were not, including the books 1 Maccabees and 2 Maccabees. Aiming to restore order in the restive province of Judea, Lysias sent an expedition of troops under Ptolemy son of Dorymenes, Nicanor, and Gorgias to find and fight the Maccabee rebels. Using trickery and marching by night, Judas Maccabeus defeated a contingent of the Seleucid force after the Seleucids had separated their army at the Battle of Emmaus in 165 BC. Lysias himself led a second and larger expedition in 164 BC. Lysias's army and the Maccabees fought at the Battle of Beth Zur but it ended either inconclusively or with a minor Maccabee victory. However, news of Antiochus IV's death in Persia made it back to Judea shortly after Beth Zur. Lysias had to immediately return to Antioch to manage the government transition and ensure that other Seleucid rivals did not seize leadership in his absence. Judas took the opportunity to triumphantly conquer the Jewish holy city of Jerusalem and to purify the Second Temple, citing the Battle of Beth Zur as the reason that the Seleucids left.

Back in Antioch, Lysias assumed the office of regent for the entire empire now on behalf of King Antiochus V Eupator, who was yet a child. Lysias apparently spent 163 BC consolidating power in Antioch. Continuing unrest in Judea meant that he assembled another army and marched on Judea again in 162 BC. His second expedition was more successful; his army was quite large and included war elephants, one of the most feared and iconic Seleucid army elements. At the Battle of Beth Zechariah, Lysias won a crushing victory over the Maccabees. Judas's brother Eleazar was slain, and Judas retreated to the safety of the mountains, abandoning Jerusalem. Lysias moved in to besiege Jerusalem afterward. However, Lysias was on a "time limit" of sorts; too long away from the capital could still lead to political trouble from internal rivals. In particular, an ambitious leader called Philip implausibly claimed that Antiochus IV had appointed him regent on his deathbed. Lysias negotiated an end to the rebellion and brought peace to Judea for a time so that he could return to face Philip. The historian Josephus wrote that Philip was caught and executed, but it is impossible to know if he had a source saying this, or was merely making an educated guess. Lysias tore down a wall in Jerusalem, presumably to reduce its future ability to rebel. He confirmed the repeal of the anti-Jewish decrees that had happened under Antiochus IV, reducing religious tensions. He also ordered the execution of despised High Priest Menelaus, and possibly appointed a replacement in Alcimus (2 Maccabees and 1 Maccabees disagree on when exactly Alcimus's appointment happened).

Back in Antioch, two notable events happened. First, a delegation from the Roman Republic, intent on enforcing the Treaty of Apamea to weaken Seleucid power, declared that the Syrian war elephants just used at Beth Zechariah were in violation of the treaty, and hamstrung them. They also burned some Seleucid warships as allegedly in violation. Lysias allowed this to happen, fearful of stoking a new Roman-Seleucid War. Secondly, two noble women of Seleucus's line were killed, Antiochis and her daughter. Ancient sources speculate this was at Lysias's instigation, although ancient sources also tend to assume any death of a noble was an assassination. All of these events may have weakened Lysias's standing with the Greek aristocrats of Antioch, if Lysias was executing potential rivals in a fit of paranoia while submitting too easily to the Romans. This may have passed without incident, but Lysias's undoing would come from an unexpected source. Demetrius I, with the help of the Greek historian Polybius, escaped from Rome and sailed to Syria. Demetrius was a man grown in his prime, while Antiochus V was still but 11 years old. Demetrius also had an excellent claim on the throne: he should have succeeded the throne in 175 BC at the death of his father, but had been a hostage in Rome at the time, allowing Antiochus IV to succeed instead, which was seen by some as a usurpation. Demetrius landed at Tripolis and rapidly attracted support; the army and the Greek aristocrats abandoned Lysias for Demetrius. Lysias and Antiochus V were arrested by their own army and executed at Demetrius's order.

== Bibliography ==
- Bar-Kochva, Bezalel (1989). Judas Maccabaeus: The Jewish Struggle Against the Seleucids. Cambridge University Press. ISBN 0521323525.
- Hutchinson, J. (1915). "Lysias". International Standard Bible Encyclopedia. Eds. Orr, James, M.A., D.D. Retrieved December 9, 2005.
