= 177 BC =

177 BC in various calendars
- Gregorian calendar: 177 BC; CLXXVII BC
- Ab urbe condita: 577
- Ancient Egypt era: XXXIII dynasty, 147
- Pharaoh: Ptolemy VI Philometor, 4
- Ancient Greek Olympiad (summer): 150th Olympiad, year 4
- Assyrian calendar: 4574
- Balinese saka calendar: N/A
- Bengali calendar: −770 – −769
- Berber calendar: 774
- Buddhist calendar: 368
- Burmese calendar: −814
- Byzantine calendar: 5332–5333
- Chinese calendar: 癸亥年 (Water Pig); 2521 or 2314 — to — 甲子年 (Wood Rat); 2522 or 2315
- Coptic calendar: −460 – −459
- Discordian calendar: 990
- Ethiopian calendar: −184 – −183
- Hebrew calendar: 3584–3585
- Hindu calendars
- Vikram Samvat: −120 – −119
- Shaka Samvat: N/A
- Kali Yuga: 2924–2925
- Holocene calendar: 9824
- Iranian calendar: 798 BP – 797 BP
- Islamic calendar: 823 BH – 822 BH
- Javanese calendar: N/A
- Julian calendar: N/A
- Korean calendar: 2157
- Minguo calendar: 2088 before ROC 民前2088年
- Nanakshahi calendar: −1644
- Seleucid era: 135/136 AG
- Thai solar calendar: 366–367
- Tibetan calendar: ཆུ་མོ་ཕག་ལོ་ (female Water-Boar) −50 or −431 or −1203 — to — ཤིང་ཕོ་བྱི་བ་ལོ་ (male Wood-Rat) −49 or −430 or −1202

Year 177 BC was a year of the pre-Julian Roman calendar. At the time it was known as the Year of the Consulship of Pulcher and Gracchus (or, less frequently, year 577 Ab urbe condita). The denomination 177 BC for this year has been used since the early medieval period, when the Anno Domini calendar era became the prevalent method in Europe for naming years.

== Events ==
=== By place ===
==== Greece ====
- Perseus of Macedonia marries Laodice, the daughter of the Seleucid king Seleucus IV.

==== Roman Republic ====
- After two military campaigns, the Romans finally subdue the Illyrian tribe of the Histri.
- Luni in northern Italy is founded by the Romans with the name Luna at the mouth of the Magra River.

== Deaths ==
- Liu Xingju, Chinese prince of the Han dynasty and a key player during the Lü Clan Disturbance (180 BC), grandson of Emperor Gao of Han and son of Prince Liu Fei of Qi
- Liu Zhang, Chinese prince of the Han dynasty and a key figure in the anti-Lü clan conspiracy during the Lü Clan Disturbance of 180 BC
