= Menelaus (High Priest) =

High Priest of Israel

Menelaus (Hebrew: מנלאוס) was High Priest in Jerusalem from about 172 BC to about 161 BC. He was high priest at the beginning of the Maccabean revolt (167-160). He was the successor of Jason, the brother of Onias III.

The sources are divided as to his origin. According to II Maccabees, he belonged to the Tribe of Benjamin and was the brother of the Simeon who had denounced Onias III to Seleucus IV Philopator, and revealed to the Syrians the existence of the treasure of the Temple; according to Flavius Josephus, Menelaus was the brother of Onias III and Jason, his two predecessors as High Priest, and also bore the name Onias. It is possible that Josephus confused Simeon, the brother of Menelaus, with Simeon, the father of Onias and Jason.

== Hellenizing tendencies ==
Although during the three years of his pontificate Jason had given many proofs of his attachment to the Hellenistic party (by building a gymnasium in Jerusalem and by introducing many Greek customs) the Hellenists of the stamp of the Tobiads plotted his overthrow, suspecting him of partiality to traditional Judaism. At their head stood Menelaus. Having been sent to Antiochus to pay the annual tribute, he took the opportunity to outbid Jason and secure for himself the office of high priest. An officer named Sostrates was sent by Antiochus with a troop of Cyprian soldiers to subdue any opposition that might be attempted by the followers of the deposed high priest Jason and to collect at the same time the sum Menelaus had promised.

Menelaus' first act was to seize the sacred vessels in the Temple stores in order to meet the obligations he had incurred. This act came to the ears of the deposed high priest Onias III, who publicly accused Menelaus of robbing the Temple. The latter, afraid of the consequences of this accusation, induced the king's lieutenant Andronicus, who had had his share of the plunder, to get rid of Onias before a formal complaint had been lodged with the king. Andronicus lured Onias away from the sanctuary to Artemis and Apollo at Daphne (a suburb of Antioch), in which he had sought asylum, and murdered him. Menelaus continued to plunder the treasures of the Temple until violence ensued, in which his brother Lysimachus met his death. He then brought before the king an accusation against the people of Jerusalem, that they were partisans of the Egyptians and persecuted him only because he was opposed to their party intrigues. This accusation caused the execution of several Jews who, although they proved beyond any doubt that Menelaus and Lysimachus had desecrated the Temple, were sentenced to death.

== Conflict with Jason ==
Meanwhile, Jason had not abandoned his claims to the high-priesthood, and while (170) Antiochus was waging war against Egypt he succeeded in making himself master of Jerusalem and in forcing Menelaus to seek refuge in the citadel. Antiochus regarded this proceeding as an affront upon his majesty, and, having been compelled by the Romans to leave Egypt, he marched against Jerusalem, massacred the inhabitants, and plundered the Temple; in this he is said to have been assisted by Menelaus.

According to biblical sources, it was Menelaus who persuaded Antiochus to Hellenize the Jewish worship, and thereby brought about the uprising of the Judeans under the guidance of the Maccabees. Most historians agree the origin story of Hannukah was actually the result of feuding Jewish families who disliked the power and influence that came with Greek culture compared to their pastoral (sheep herding and agriculture) traditions. The primary driver for the civil war between these minority Jewish families was a coup for power against the current High Priest Auction practices, which allowed Menelaus to usurp the role in the first place. During the first years of the restoration of the Jewish worship Menelaus still remained (though only nominally) high priest. Classicist John Ma suggests that the letters preserved in II Maccabees imply that it was Menelaus who actually negotiated the return of traditional religious and civic rights to the Jewish community, with the Hasmoneans later taking credit. Menelaus is said to have been put to death by Antiochus V Eupator when the latter made definite concessions to the Jews, the reason assigned being that Antiochus was informed by his childhood guardian Lysias, that Menelaus, by his counsel, was indirectly responsible for the Jewish rebellion. Accordingly in the 13th chapter of II Maccabees, Menelaus on order of Antiochus was promptly taken to the city of Beroea and executed by being thrown into a tower filled with ashes, whereupon he promptly sank to the bottom and suffocated to death. Menelaus' supposed death by ashes was seen by the book's writer as divine poetic justice for his prior actions leading to the desecration of the Temple of Jerusalem, and more specifically the desecration of the holy altar and flame where sacrifices were burnt to ashes and offered to God.

== Notes ==
Jewish titles
Preceded by Jason	High Priest of Israel c.170 BC—c.162 BC	Succeeded by Alcimus
