= Demetrius I Soter =

King of Seleucid Empire from 162 to 150 BC

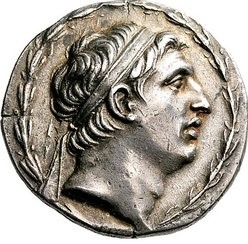
- Silver tetradrachm of Demetrios I Soter, minted in Soloi, featuring a portrait of Demetrios on the obverse. SC 1611.3

Basileus of the Seleucid Empire
- Reign: November 162 – June 150 BC
- Predecessor: Antiochus V Eupator
- Successor: Alexander Balas
- Rival king: Timarchus (163–160 BC)
- Born: 185 BC
- Died: June 150 BC (aged 34 or 35)
- Spouse: Laodice V
- Issue: Demetrius II Nicator; Antiochus VII Sidetes; Antigonus
- Dynasty: Seleucid
- Father: Seleucus IV Philopator
- Mother: Laodice IV

Demetrius I Soter (Ancient Greek: Δημήτριος Α` ὁ Σωτήρ, Dēmḗtrios ho Sōtḗr, "Demetrius the Saviour"; 185 – June 150 BC) reigned as king of the Hellenistic Seleucid Empire from November 162 to June 150 BC. Demetrius grew up in Rome as a hostage, but returned to Greek Syria and overthrew his young cousin Antiochus V Eupator and regent Lysias. Demetrius took control during a turbulent time of the Empire, and spent much of his time fighting off revolts and challenges to his power from threats such as Timarchus and Alexander Balas.

== Biography ==
=== Early confinement and escape ===
Demetrius was born around 185 BC. He was sent to Rome as a hostage at a young age during the reign of his father Seleucus IV Philopator and his mother Laodice IV. Rome taking prominent Seleucid family members hostage was one of the terms of the Treaty of Apamea that had ended the Roman-Seleucid War. His father was likely murdered by his finance minister Heliodorus in 175 BC; his uncle Antiochus IV Epiphanes overthrew Heliodorus and took the throne himself. While the throne should have gone to Demetrius, he was both too young and also still held as a hostage in Rome. Antiochus IV died around October–November 164 BC while on campaign in Babylonia and Persia. His 9-year-old son Antiochus V Eupator became king, although real power rested with Lysias, the regent Antiochus IV had left in Antioch. Demetrius, 22 years old then, requested the Roman Senate to restore the Seleucid throne to him, but was rejected, since the Romans wanted a weak Seleucid Empire and therefore preferred a boy king to a man. Two years later, Antiochus V was greatly weakened; Rome had sent an emissary to sink his ships and hamstring his elephants according to the terms of the Treaty of Apamea. Demetrius again petitioned the Senate on the grounds that his captivity would do little to inspire Antiochus V to heed Rome, but the appeal was again unsuccessful, as Rome preferred the perceived weak boy king over him. With the help of the Greek historian Polybius, Demetrius escaped from confinement and made his way to the Seleucid capital Antioch. There he successfully gained the support of the local aristocracy and took the Seleucid throne from his cousin in around November 162 BC. He immediately executed Antiochus V and Lysias.

This phase of Demetrius's life is unusually well-chronicled, as Polybius was an active participant and advisor to Demetrius, and his book The Histories survived out of antiquity rather than being a lost book.

=== Reign as King ===
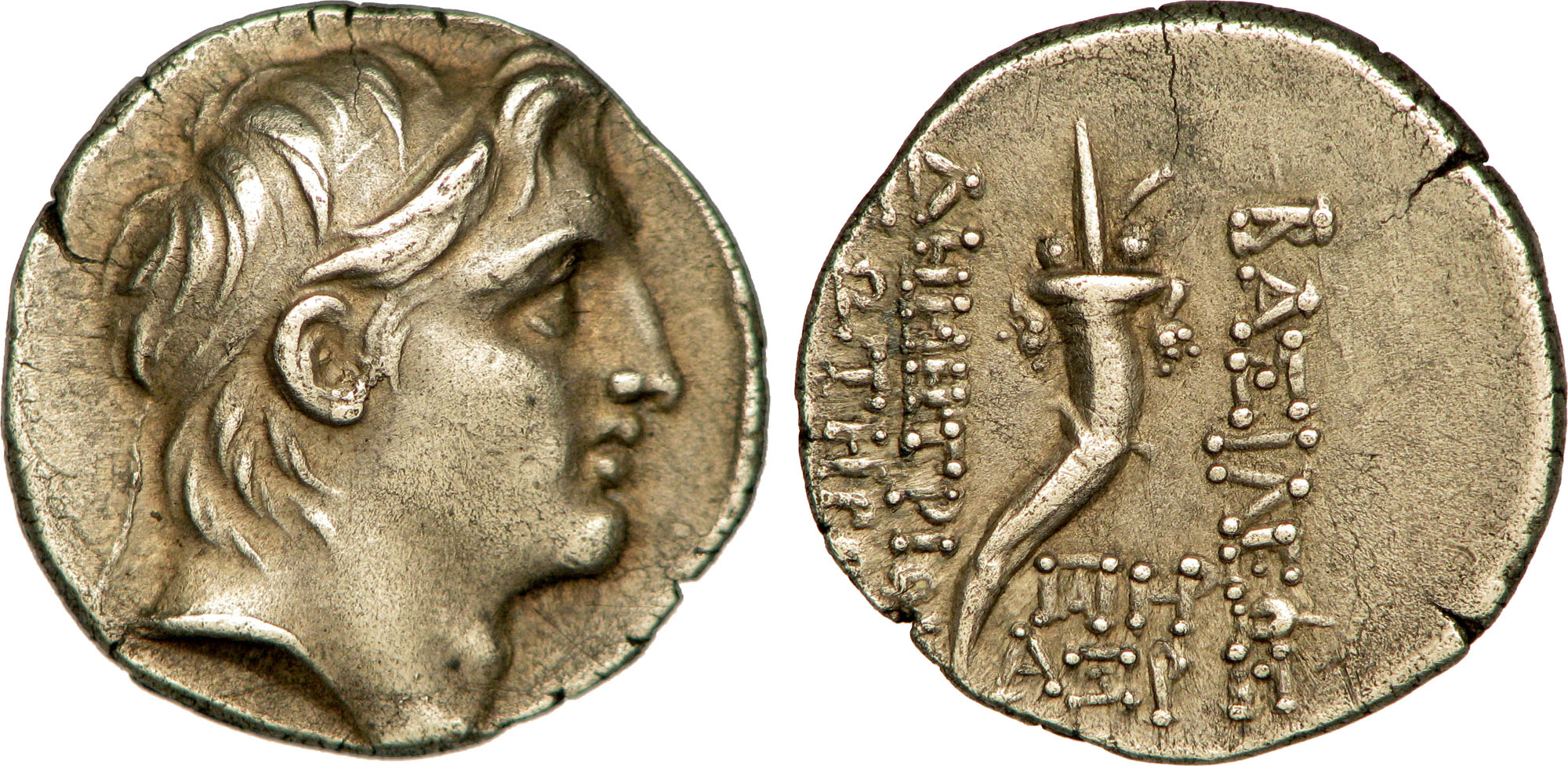
Silver drachm of Demetrius I Soter. Reverse shows the cornucopia, with Greek legend: ΒΑΣΙΛΕΩΣ ΔΗΜΗΤΡΙΟΥ ΣΩΤΗΡΟΣ, Basileōs Dēmētriou Sōtēros, "of savior king Demetrius."

The Romans were not enthusiastic about Demetrius's rule. They offered their indirect support and encouragement to any who would seek to divide the Seleucid Empire, and hence weaken it. Notably, this included the satrap Timarchus; the Jewish Maccabees; Ptolemaeus of Commagene; and Artaxias I of Armenia.

Demetrius instituted measure to suppress the Maccabean Revolt in Judea. According to the books of the Maccabees Demetrius sent a certain Alcimus as a new High Priest to Judea shortly after his reign started. Alcimus was able to persuade some of the Jews to return to the Seleucid fold. Demetrius also dispatched an expedition under Bacchides which broke Maccabee influence over the Judean cities. Bacchides and his forces defeated and killed the rebel leader Judas Maccabaeus at the Battle of Elasa in 160 BC, restoring Seleucid control to the province for a number of years.

Demetrius acquired his surname of Soter (Savior) from the Babylonians, when he defeated Timarchus, the rebellious satrap of Media . Timarchus, who had distinguished himself by defending Media against the emergent Parthians, seems to have treated Demetrius' accession as an excuse to declare himself an independent king and extend his realm into Babylonia. His forces were, however, not enough to stand against the new Seleucid king: Demetrius defeated and killed Timarchus in 160 BC, and dethroned Ariarathes, king of Cappadocia. The Seleucid empire was temporarily united again.

Demetrius may have married his sister Laodice V, by whom he had three sons: Demetrius II Nicator, Antiochus VII Sidetes, and Antigonus.

=== Downfall and death ===
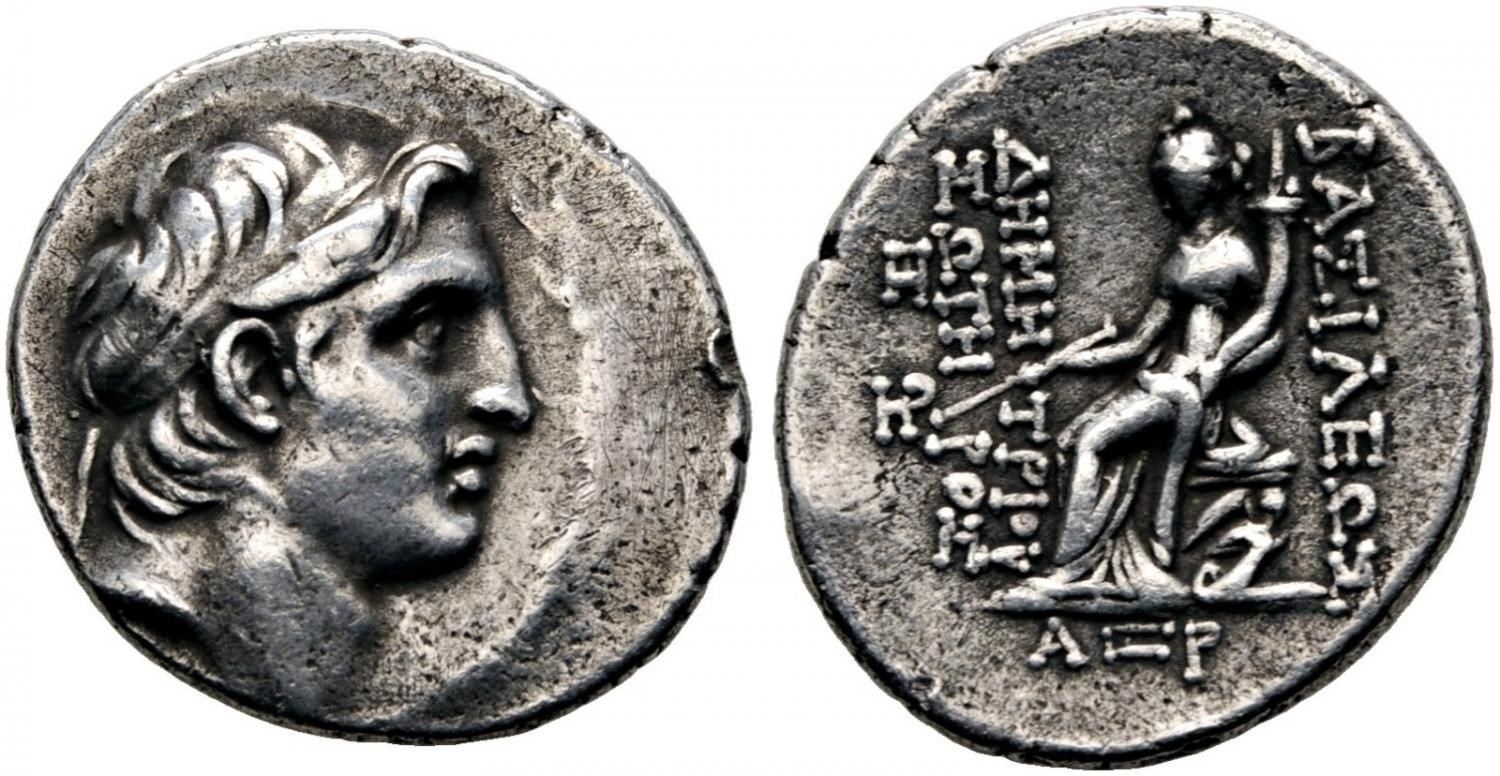
Silver tetradrachm of Demetrius I Soter.

Demetrius' downfall may be attributed to Heracleides, a surviving brother of the defeated rebel Timarchus, who championed the cause of Alexander Balas, a boy who claimed to be a natural son of Antiochus IV Epiphanes. Heracleides convinced the Roman Senate to support the young pretender against Demetrius I. Balas's mercenary army landed and occupied Ptolemais, and started a reign proclaiming himself as king of the Seleucids in Seleucid year 160 (153–152 BC). The Seleucids now had two kings locked in civil war.

While the Jews were a minor part of Demetrius I's empire, their story was unusually well preserved. Jonathan Apphus, the brother of Judas and the new leader of the Maccabees, was able to negotiate a deal with Demetrius I that would allow him to remove some of the Seleucid forces from Judea to use against Balas. However, Jonathan promptly broke his temporary truce with Demetrius after Alexander Balas offered an even better deal to them. Balas allied with Jonathan: he appointed him as High Priest of Judea and strategos, and Jonathan agreed to send Jewish troops to support Balas's cause. Jonathan, who was born of a priestly family but not from Zadok, the high priestly stock, took the title in Tishri, 152 BC. When Demetrius heard of it, he wrote a letter offering more privileges to Jonathan (1 Macc. 10:25-45). Jonathan did not accept the offer, whether from trust in Balas, distrust in Demetrius, belief that Balas was likely to win the civil war, or a combination of all three.

Balas defeated and killed Demetrius I in 150 BC, becoming the sole king of Syria.

== Legacy ==
In 1919 Constantine Cavafy published a poem about Demetrius's time as a hostage in Rome.

== See also ==
- Timeline of Syrian history

== Notes ==
Demetrius I Soter Seleucid dynasty Born: 185 BC Died: 150 BC
Preceded by Antiochus V Eupator	Seleucid King (King of Syria); 161–150 BC	Succeeded by Alexander Balas
