= Jason (High Priest) =

High Priest of Israel

Jason (Hebrew: Yason, יאסון; Greek: Ἰάσων, Iásōn) was the High Priest of Israel from around 175 BC to 171 BC during the Second Temple period of Judaism. He was of the Oniad family and was brother to Onias III, his predecessor as High Priest. Josephus records that his name was originally Jesus or Joshua (Hebrew יֵשׁוּעַ Yēshua`) before he changed it.

Jason's tenure came during a turbulent period, and ancient sources such as the book of 2 Maccabees are hostile to him as a moderate Hellenizer, even if he was not as extreme as his successor. The new king of the Seleucid Empire which ruled Judea at the time, Antiochus IV Epiphanes, apparently started to auction off the position of High Priest to the highest bidder: whoever offered the most yearly tribute from the Temple in Jerusalem to the Seleucid government in Antioch could have it. It is unknown to what extent such corruption was simply an accusation by Jason's enemies and how much was real. Regardless, Jason apparently outbid his brother for the position in 175 BC, and a newcomer named Menelaus outbid Jason in 171 BC, resulting in his dismissal from the position. He later attempted to forcibly retake his old position in 168 BC, but failed, and was forced into exile.

== Biography ==
Onias III ruled as High Priest for an unknown length of time prior to Jason's accession. Both Onias III and Jason were sons of Simon II, an earlier High Priest. In 175 BC, Antiochus IV Epiphanes returned from exile in Greece to take the throne of the Seleucid Empire. He appointed Jason as the new High Priest shortly thereafter. A number of reasons for this action are described in ancient sources and have been propounded by later scholars. Some believe that Antiochus IV favored Hellenization, or standardizing Greek culture across the widespread Seleucid lands more firmly, and Jason was more of a Hellenist than his brother. Others cite corruption, saying that Jason offered a higher tribute to Antiochus than Onias III had been paying to the previous king. Finally, Onias III may have been suspected by Antiochus IV as too friendly to the Ptolemies; Coele-Syria had only been wrested from Ptolemaic hands recently, in the Fifth Syrian War, and he may have wished to dismiss officials who might welcome the Ptolemies back too eagerly.

During his reign, Jason was given permission to start a Greek-style polis (or city) and a gymnasium at or near Jerusalem, called Antioch or Antiochia. Residents there would presumably raise their children in the style of the Greeks and learn the Greek language; such Greek settlements were scattered across the Empire. Jason was given authority to choose which citizens would be eligible and control the politics of such a suburb. Regardless, these changes did not immediately appear to rouse any particular complaint from the majority of the citizenry in Jerusalem, and Jason presumably he still kept the basic Jewish laws and tenets. By Hellenistic norms, this would have established Jason as a statesman and benefactor of Jerusalem. Other than this, during his term he apparently sent representatives to a duplication of the Olympian games celebrated in the presence of Antiochus IV at Tyre, and presented 300 drachmas for a sacrifice to Heracles, to whom the games were dedicated.

Jason's time as High Priest was brought to an abrupt end in 171 BC when he sent Menelaus, the brother of Simon the Benjamite, to deliver money to Antiochus IV at the Seleucid capital Antioch. Menelaus took this opportunity to "outbid" Jason for the priesthood, resulting in Antiochus confirming Menelaus as the High Priest. Still, Menelaus's rule was clearly unsteady, as Jason's supporters had been appointed to key leadership positions during his time.

In 170–168 BC, the Sixth Syrian War between the Seleucids and the Ptolemaic Egyptians arose. Antiochus IV led an army to attack Egypt in 170 BC before returning in 169 BC. Tensions with the Ptolemaic dynasty continued, and Antiochus rode out on campaign again in 168 BC. According to the book of 2 Maccabees, Jason heard a rumor that Antiochus IV had perished in Egypt, and launched an attempted coup against Menelaus in Jerusalem to reclaim his office as High Priest. The exact details of how successful the ouster went are lost, but it went well enough to alarm Antiochus IV, who was not dead. He apparently interpreted this factional infighting as a revolt against his personal authority, and sent an army to Jerusalem crush Jason and his allies. From 168–167 BC, the conflict spiraled out of control. Thousands in Jerusalem were killed and thousands more were enslaved; the city was attacked twice; new Greek governors were sent; and the government seized land and property from Jason's supporters.

Jason fled after the Seleucids attacked Jerusalem, and traveled from place to place. According to 2 Maccabees, he first went to the Ammonites of Ammon to the east of Judea; then to Nabatea to the southeast of Judea where he was prisoner of King Aretas I; then to Ptolemaic Egypt; and finally to Sparta. The disruption from the attack on Jerusalem, and the anti-Jewish decrees issued by Antiochus IV following the event, would eventually lead to the Maccabean Revolt.

== Later assessment ==
Ancient Jewish sources are hostile to Jason, calling him impious. According to 2 Maccabees, Jason's actions made light of or pushed aside the earlier arrangements that Jerusalem had, such as its accord with Antiochus III after being taken by the Seleucids in the aftermath of the Fifth Syrian War. By seeking new agreements and putting new people in power, Jason weakened the older structures of government and tradition, an act that would come back to hurt his own standing after he himself was betrayed and replaced. Essentially, Jason is accused of having loosened the traditions of autonomy given to the Jewish leadership by integrating with the Seleucid leadership too closely with these novel agreements for a gymnasium and Greek polis.

== See also ==
- Hellenistic Judaism

Jewish titles
Preceded by Onias III	High Priest of Israel; 175 BC—172 BC	Succeeded by Menelaus
