= Treaty of Apamea =

188 BC peace treaty between the Roman Republic and Seleucid Empire

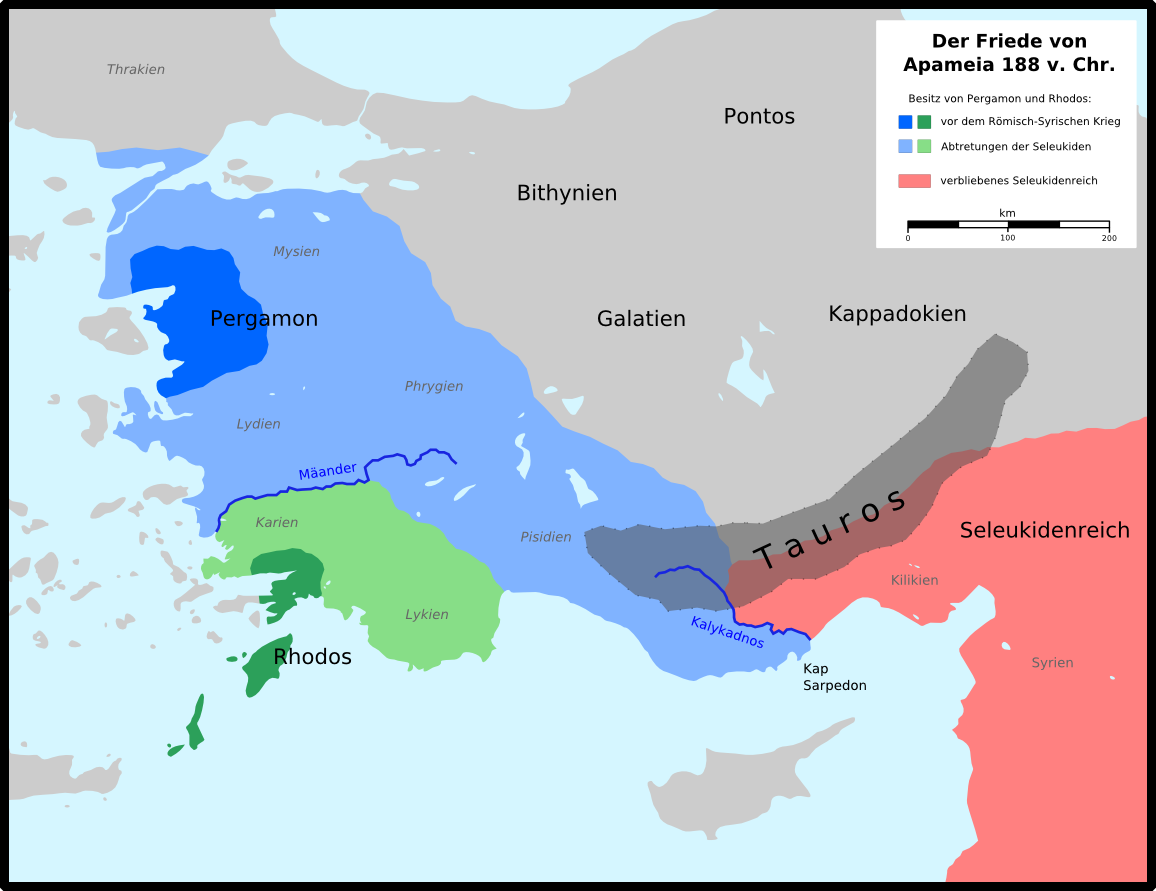
Map of Asia Minor after the Treaty of Apamea, with the gains of Pergamon (light blue) and Rhodes (light green)

The Treaty of Apamea was a peace treaty conducted in 188 BC between the Roman Republic and Antiochus III, ruler of the Seleucid Empire. It ended the Roman–Seleucid War. The treaty took place after Roman victories at the Battle of Thermopylae (in 191 BC), the Battle of Magnesia (in 190 BC), and after Roman and Rhodian naval victories over the Seleucid navy.

== Terms of the treaty ==
The treaty, according to Appian, obliged Antiochus III to abandon Europe altogether and all of Asia west of the Taurus Mountains. He had to surrender all the war elephants in his possession and was limited to twelve warships for the purpose of keeping his subjects under control, but he was allowed to build more if he was attacked. Antiochus was barred from recruiting mercenaries "north of the Taurus" (that is, from territory just ceded to Roman allies Pergamon and Rhodes) and entertaining fugitives from the same. Antiochus had to give twenty hostages, whom the Roman consul would select. The hostages should be changed every third year, except the son of Antiochus. In the future, he would maintain no elephants. The Seleucids were forced to pay an indemnity of 15,000 talents of silver of debt: 500 Euboic talents immediately, 2,500 more when the Roman Senate ratified the treaty, and installments of 1,000 talents each to be delivered to Rome annually for the next twelve years. The Seleucids also agreed to an indemnity of 540,000 modii of corn. He was also forced to surrender all prisoners and deserters to his enemies, and to Eumenes II, the King of Pergamon, whatever remains of the possessions he acquired by his agreement with Attalus I, the father of Eumenes.

Rome gave the control of a large part of Asia Minor to Eumenes. Antiochus kept the region of Cilicia, while most of Lycia and Caria became part of the Rhodian Peraia. Hellenistic kings generally accepted, for their own lifetimes, any treaty they had signed, on the grounds of honour. On the other hand, their heirs did not feel honour bound to accept treaties signed by their predecessors. The naval conditions of the treaty appear to have fallen into abeyance, but the other conditions held.

The treaty was formalized at Apamea in Phrygia. It allowed the Romans to expand their political hegemony to the Eastern Mediterranean Sea. But at this time Roman power was still indirect, and Rome depended on its capacity to ally itself to second-rank powers such as Pergamon and Rhodes. The harsh reparations weakened the Seleucid Empire, causing a shortage of money and weakening the ability of the Seleucids to manage their kingdom.

== Later influence ==
Rome used the threat of a renewed war to check Seleucid power from reasserting itself in the region. In the Sixth Syrian War, Rome insisted that the Seleucids leave the Ptolemaic Empire alone after occupying much of Egypt and Cyprus in 168 BC; Seleucid king Antiochus IV grudgingly accepted. Polybius's Histories records that as late as 162 BC, a Roman delegation led by Gnaeus Octavius visited Antioch, and used the Treaty as an excuse to hamstring Seleucid war elephants and destroy Seleucid ships as being in violation of the terms of the treaty. Octavius was killed by a Seleucid partisan named Leptines of Laodicea to avenge the destruction and the slight on the Empire's honor, and another person named Isocrates publicly suggested killing the other Roman envoys as well. Strangely, the Roman Senate seems to have disavowed Octavius's actions, and let the killer go.

== See also ==
- 2 Maccabees 3
- Heliodorus stele
