= Antiochus V Eupator =

King of the Seleucid Empire from 164 to 162 BC

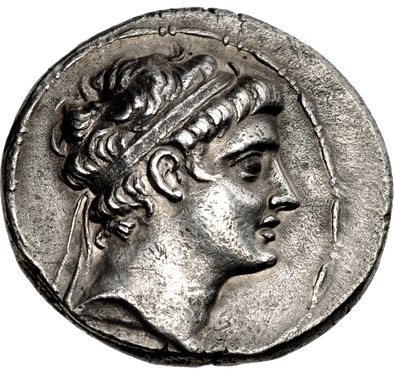
- Silver tetradrachm of Antiochos V Eupator, minted in Antioch, featuring a portrait of Antiochos on the obverse. SC 1575.11

Basileus of the Seleucid Empire
- Reign: November/December 164 – 162 BC
- Predecessor: Antiochus IV Epiphanes
- Successor: Demetrius I Soter
- Regent: General Lysias
- Born: c. 172 BC
- Died: 162 BC (aged 10 or 11)
- Dynasty: Seleucid
- Father: Antiochus IV Epiphanes
- Mother: Laodice IV

Antiochus V Eupator (Ancient Greek: Αντίοχος Ε' Ευπάτωρ), whose epithet means "of a good father" (c. 172 BC – 162 BC) was a ruler of the Seleucid Empire who reigned from late 164 to 162 BC (based on dates from 1 Maccabees 6:16 and 7:1).

He was appointed as king by the Romans with his protector Lysias as regent.

== Biography ==
=== Early life and succession ===
Antiochus V was only nine years old when he succeeded to the kingship, following the death in Persia of his father Antiochus IV Epiphanes and his mother Laodice IV. The general Lysias, who had been left in charge of Syria by Epiphanes, served as regent for the child, although he was challenged by other generals. The Roman Senate still kept Demetrius, son of Seleucus IV and the rightful heir to the throne, as a hostage, refusing to release him because they considered it better to have Syria nominally ruled by a boy and his regent than the 22-year-old Demetrius.

=== Reign ===
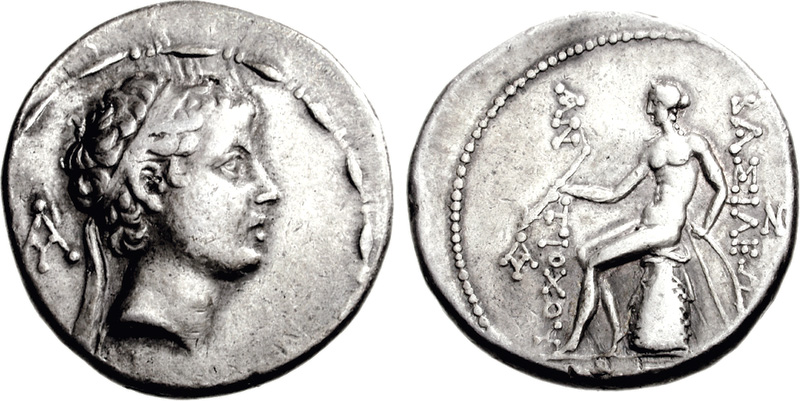
Coin depicting Antiochus V, with the Greek inscription ΒΑΣΙΛΕΩΣ ANTIOXOY, meaning "of King Antiochus"

At the outset of the reign of Antiochus V, there was an attempt by the Syrians to quell the Maccabean Revolt in Judea, but this ended in a weak compromise. After a military victory in the Battle of Beth-Zecharia and the killing of Eleazar Avaran, a brother of Judas Maccabeus, Lysias was informed that Philip (a confidant of Antiochus IV Epiphanes, who had accompanied this previous king to conquer Mesopotamia and had been entrusted prior to the death of the king with the upbringing of Antiochus V) was returning to the capital with the other half of the Seleucid army. Lysias felt threatened and advised Antiochus V to offer peace to the Jews. The Jews accepted; however, in order to ensure they would not rise against them again soon, the Syrian king and regent broke their promise and tore down the walls of Jerusalem before leaving. Upon reaching their own kingdom, Lysias and Antiochus V found Philip in control of the capital Antioch, but they defeated him and retook the city and kingdom.

=== Downfall and death ===
When the Roman Senate heard that the Syrian kingdom kept more warships and elephants than allowed by the Treaty of Apamea made in 188 BC, they sent a Roman embassy to travel along the cities of Syria and attempted to cripple Seleucid military power by sinking the Syrians' warships and hamstringing their elephants. Lysias dared do nothing to oppose the Romans, but his subservience so enraged his Syrian subjects that the Roman envoy Gnaeus Octavius was assassinated in Laodicea in 162 BC.

At this juncture Demetrius escaped from Rome and was received in Syria as the true king. Antiochus V Eupator was soon put to death together with his protector Lysias.

== See also ==
- List of Syrian monarchs

Antiochus V Eupator Seleucid dynasty Born: 172 BC Died: 161 BC
Regnal titles
Preceded by Antiochus IV Epiphanes	Seleucid King (King of Syria); 163–161 BC	Succeeded by Demetrius I Soter
