= Antiochus IV Epiphanes =

King of the Seleucid Empire from 175 to 164 BC

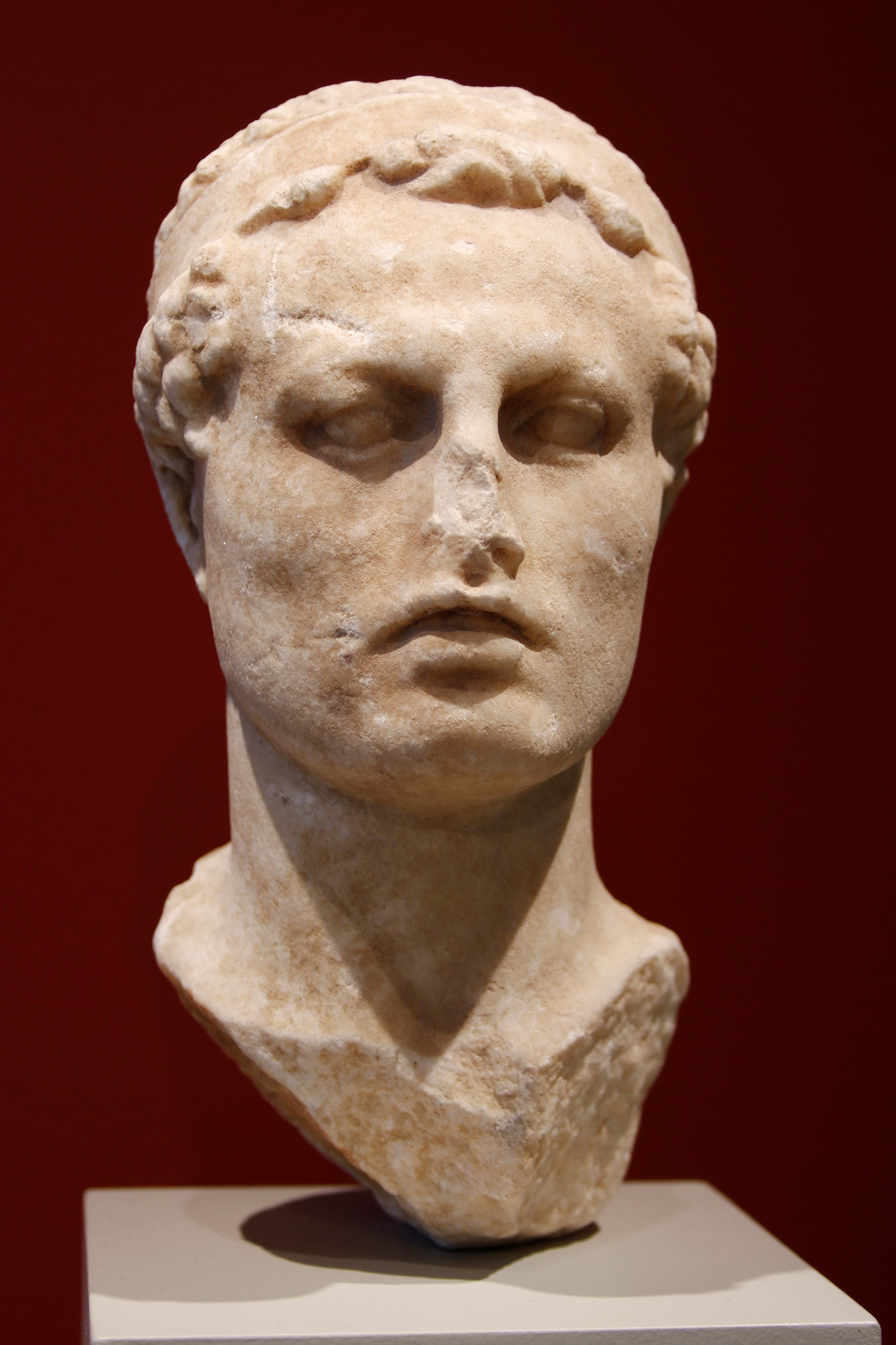
- Bust of Antiochus IV at the Altes Museum in Berlin

Basileus of the Seleucid Empire
- Reign: 3 September 175 – November/December 164 BC
- Predecessor: Antiochus, son of Seleucus IV
- Successor: Antiochus V Eupator
- Co-king: Antiochus, son of Seleucus IV (175–170 BC)
- Born: c. 215 BC
- Died: November/December 164 BC (aged 50–51)
- Wife: Laodice IV
- Issue: Antiochus V Eupator; Laodice VI; Antiochis; Alexander Balas (possibly); Laodice (possibly)
- Dynasty: Seleucid
- Father: Antiochus III the Great
- Mother: Laodice III
- Religion: Hellenistic religion

Antiochus IV Epiphanes (Note: /ænˈtaɪ.əkəs ɛˈpɪfəniːz, ˌæntiˈɒkəs/; Ancient Greek: Ἀντίοχος ὁ Ἐπιφανής, romanized: Antiochos ho Epiphanes, God Manifest) (c. 215 BC–November/December 164 BC) was king of the Seleucid Empire from 175 BC until his death in 164 BC. Notable events during Antiochus' reign include his near-conquest of Ptolemaic Egypt, his persecution of the Jews of Judea and Samaria, and the rebellion of the Jewish Maccabees.

The son of King Antiochus III the Great, Antiochus IV’s accession to the throne was controversial, as he was seen as a usurper by some. After the death of his brother Seleucus IV Philopator in 175 BC, the "true" heir should have been Seleucus's son Demetrius I. However, Demetrius I was very young and a hostage in Rome at the time, and Antiochus seized the opportunity to declare himself king instead, successfully rallying enough of the Greek ruling class in Antioch to support his claim. This helped set a destabilizing trend in the Seleucid Empire in subsequent generations, as an increasing number of claimants tried to usurp the throne. After his own death, power struggles between competing lines of the ruling dynasty heavily contributed to the collapse of the empire. Antiochus's often eccentric behavior and capricious actions led some of his contemporaries to call him Epimanes ("The Mad"). He is often taken as being a prototype of the Antichrist in certain forms of Christianity.

== Rise to power ==
Born around 215 BC, Antiochus was a son of the Seleucid king Antiochus III the Great. Antiochus appears to have been originally named Mithridates, although this name would be changed either after the death of his elder brother Antiochus or when he eventually ascended the throne. As a potential successor to the throne, he became a political hostage of the Roman Republic under the terms of the Treaty of Apamea, concluded in 188 BC. After his older brother Seleucus IV Philopator succeeded their father onto the throne in 187 BC, Antiochus was exchanged for his nephew Demetrius, the son and heir of Seleucus. After this Antiochus lived in Athens and was there when his brother was assassinated in 175 BC by the government minister Heliodorus.

Heliodorus proclaimed himself regent afterward, essentially giving himself control of the government. This arrangement did not last long. With the help of king Eumenes II of Pergamum, Antiochus IV traveled from Athens through Asia Minor and reached Syria by November 175 BC. Seleucus' legitimate heir Demetrius was still a hostage in Rome, so Antiochus seized the throne for himself, proclaiming himself co-regent with another son of Seleucus, an infant also named Antiochus. The young Antiochus, son of Seleucus IV, would later die in 170 BC, possibly murdered by Antiochus IV.

=== Ruling style ===
Antiochus IV cultivated a reputation as an extravagant and generous ruler. He scattered money to common people in the streets of Antioch; gave unexpected gifts to people he did not know; contributed money to the Temple of Zeus at Athens and the altar at Delos; put all his Western military forces on a massive parade at Daphne, a suburb of Antioch; and held opulent banquets with the aristocracy using the best spices, clothing, and food. He also supplemented the Seleucid army with mercenaries. All of this cost the Seleucid treasury, but the Empire was apparently able to raise enough taxes to pay for it. His eccentric behavior and unexpected interactions with common people such as appearing in the public bath houses and applying for municipal offices led his detractors to call him Epimanes (Ἐπιμανής, Epimanḗs, "The Mad"), a word play on his title Epiphanes ("God Manifest").

=== Divine epithets ===
Antiochus was the first Seleucid king to use divine epithets on coins, perhaps inspired by the Bactrian Hellenistic kings who had earlier done so, or else building on the ruler cult that his father Antiochus the Great had codified within the Seleucid Empire. These epithets included Θεὸς Ἐπιφανής "manifest god", and, after his defeat of Egypt, Νικηφόρος "bringer of victory".

== War against Ptolemaic Egypt ==
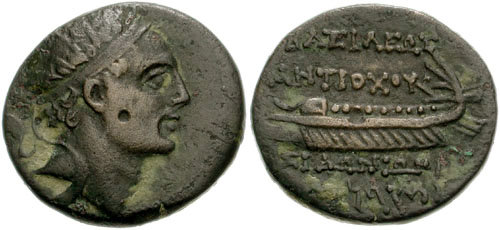
Sidon coinage of Antiochos IV, depicting a victorious galley

After his ascension Antiochus took care to maintain good relations with the Roman Republic, sending an embassy to Rome in 173 BC with a part of the unpaid indemnity still owed from the 188 BC Treaty of Apamea. While there the embassy secured a renewed treaty of friendship and alliance with Rome, greatly helped by the fact Antiochus had come to power with the help of Eumenes II, Rome's principal ally in the region.

The guardians of King Ptolemy VI Philometor demanded the return of Coele-Syria in 170 BC, declaring war on the Seleucids on the assumption that the kingdom was divided after Antiochus' murder of his nephew. However, Antiochus had warning of the attack and had prepared more thoroughly. He had already built his forces and moved them into position; as soon as the Egyptian forces left Pelusium they were attacked and defeated by Antiochus IV and his Seleucid army. The Seleucids then seized Pelusium, giving them supplies and access to all of Egypt. He advanced into Egypt proper, conquering all but Alexandria and capturing King Ptolemy. This was partially achieved because Rome (Ptolemaic Egypt's traditional ally) was embroiled in the Third Macedonian War and was not willing to become involved elsewhere.

To avoid alarming Rome, Antiochus allowed Ptolemy VI to continue ruling as a puppet king from Memphis. Upon Antiochus' withdrawal, the city of Alexandria chose a new king, one of Ptolemy's brothers, also named Ptolemy (VIII Euergetes). The Ptolemy brothers reconciled and agreed to rule Egypt jointly instead of fighting a civil war.

=== Roman intervention ===
In 168 BC, Antiochus led a second attack on Egypt and also sent a fleet to capture Cyprus. Before he reached Alexandria, his path was blocked by a single elderly Roman ambassador named Gaius Popillius Laenas who delivered a message from the Roman Senate directing Antiochus to withdraw his armies from Egypt and Cyprus or consider himself in a state of war with the Roman Republic. Antiochus said he would discuss it with his council, whereupon the Roman envoy drew a line in the sand around Antiochus and said: "Before you leave this circle, give me a reply that I can take back to the Roman Senate." This implied Rome would declare war if the King stepped out of the circle without committing to leave Egypt immediately. Weighing his options, Antiochus decided to withdraw. Only then did Popillius agree to shake hands with him.

Ancient sources and traditional historiography describe this "Day of Eleusis" as a great humiliation for Antiochus IV that unhinged him for a time. Some more modern historians conjecture that Antiochus may have been more reconciled to this than ancient sources indicate, as the Roman intervention meant that Antiochus had been given an excuse to not undertake a potentially long and costly siege of Alexandria. He could instead return with treasure and loot having weakened the Egyptian state at little risk and cost compared to a larger-scale invasion.

== Persecution of the Jews and the Maccabean revolt ==
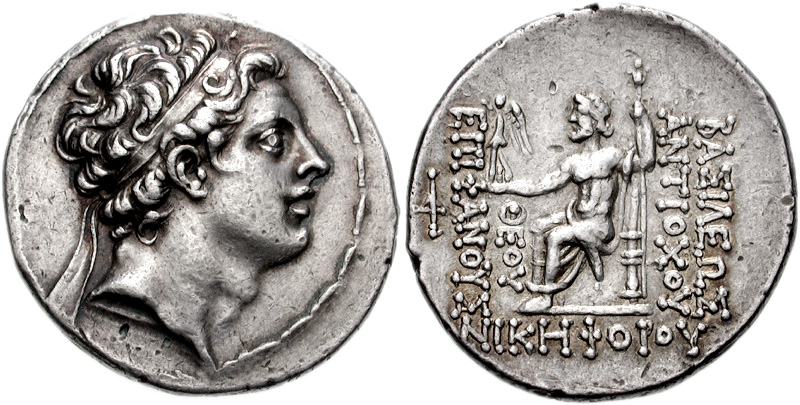
Silver coin of king Antiochus IV. Reverse shows seated Zeus holding Nike and scepter. Greek inscription reads: ΒΑΣΙΛΕΩΣ ΑΝΤΙΟΧΟΥ ΝΙΚΗΦΟΡΟΥ ΘΕΟΥ ΕΠΙΦΑΝΟΥΣ, Basileōs Antiochou Nikēphorou Theou Epiphanous, "of victorious god manifest king Antiochus".

The Seleucids, like the Ptolemies before them, held a suzerainty over Judea: they respected Jewish culture and protected Jewish institutions. This policy was drastically reversed by Antiochus IV, seemingly after what was either a dispute over leadership of the Temple in Jerusalem and the office of High Priest, or possibly a revolt whose nature was lost to time after being crushed.

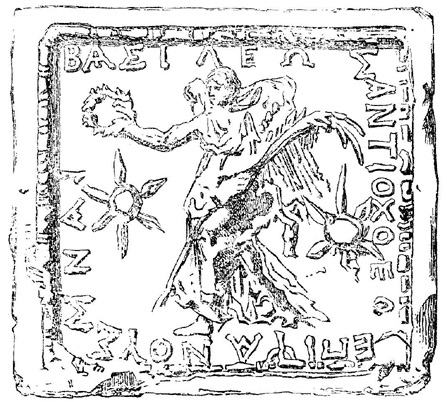
Mina of Antiochus IV Epiphanes

Local revolts against the Seleucid Empire were not unusual, but most were not successful. The revolt that Antiochus IV ultimately triggered in Judea was unusually well chronicled and preserved, however. According to the book of 2 Maccabees, the crisis had its origins in the years leading up to the Sixth Syrian War. In 171 BC, Antiochus had deposed the High Priest Jason and replaced him with Menelaus, who had offered Antiochus a large bribe to secure the office. In 168 BC, when Antiochus was campaigning in Egypt, a rumor spread in Judea that he had been killed. Jason gathered a force of 1,000 soldiers and made a surprise attack on the city of Jerusalem. Menelaus was forced to flee Jerusalem during the ensuing riot. Jason's intention may have been to retake his former office by force and present his reassumption of power as fait accompli to the regency that would take power in the wake of the king's death, assuming that they would allow him to stay in power rather than invite further conflict during a delicate political moment. But Antiochus was still alive, and returned from Egypt enraged by the reverse he had suffered at the hands of the Romans and by the Jews' rejection of his chosen candidate for High Priest; he attacked Jerusalem and restored Menelaus, then executed many Jews.

When these happenings were reported to the king, he thought that Judea was in revolt. Raging like a wild animal, he set out from Egypt and took Jerusalem by storm. He ordered his soldiers to cut down without mercy those whom they met and to slay those who took refuge in their houses. There was a massacre of young and old, a killing of women and children, a slaughter of virgins and infants. In the space of three days, eighty thousand were lost, forty thousand meeting a violent death, and the same number being sold into slavery.

— 2 Maccabees 5:11–14 (NRSV)

According to 1 Maccabees, after restoring Menelaus, Antiochus IV issued decrees aimed at helping the most enthusiastically pro-Greek faction of Hellenized Jews against the traditionalists. He outlawed Jewish religious rites and traditions and the Temple in Jerusalem was forcibly changed to a syncretic Greek-Jewish cult that included worship of Zeus. The Greek historian Diodorus wrote that Antiochus "sacrificed a great swine at the image of Moses, and at the altar of God that stood in the outward court, and sprinkled them with the blood of the sacrifice. He commanded likewise that the books, by which they were taught to hate all other nations, should be sprinkled with the broth made of the swine's flesh. And he put out the lamp (called by them immortal) which burns continually in the temple. Lastly he forced the high priest and the other Jews to eat swine's flesh."

These decrees were a departure from typical Seleucid practice, which did not attempt to suppress local religions in their empire, though they may be similar to other instances in the Hellenistic era when local polities were punished for revolt against their imperial suzerain by having their autonomy and local laws repealed and local shrines removed from their control. The city of Jerusalem was sacked a second time in the disorder. Antiochus established a military Greek citadel called the Acra in Jerusalem to serve as a stronghold for Hellenized Jews and a Greek military garrison. This happened from 168–167 BC.

Such steps triggered a revolt against his rule, known as the Maccabean Revolt. Scholars of Second Temple Judaism therefore sometimes refer to Antiochus' reign as the 'Antiochene crises' for the Jews. Traditionally, as expressed in the First and Second Books of the Maccabees, the Maccabean Revolt was painted as a national resistance to a foreign political and cultural oppression. In modern times, however, scholars have argued that Antiochus IV was more intervening in a civil war between the traditionalist Jews in the country and the Hellenized Jews in Jerusalem.

Scholars think the revolt also led to the writing of the Book of Daniel, where a villain called the "King of the North" is generally considered to be a reference to Antiochus IV. (Note: See Book of Daniel for details. In general, scholars fall into two camps: some argue that some form of chapters 2–6 of Daniel circulated in the 6th, 5th, or 4th centuries BC, shortly after the events of the book, and only the first and final six chapters were written during the Maccabean period (such as Lester L. Grabbe and John J. Collins). Other scholars argue that the entire work was created in the Maccabean period, although presumably loosely influenced by older legends of the Babylonian period. Some traditionalist scholars defend that the entire work was written during or shortly after the life of the Prophet Daniel; of the traditionalists, some say that the prophecies therein have not yet been fulfilled, which would render it unrelated to Antiochus IV Epiphanes, while others of the traditionalist bent see the work as loosely foretelling Antiochus IV.) The portrayal of Antiochus there attacking the holy city of Jerusalem but eventually meeting his end would influence later Christian depictions of the Antichrist.

== Campaign against Parthia and final years ==
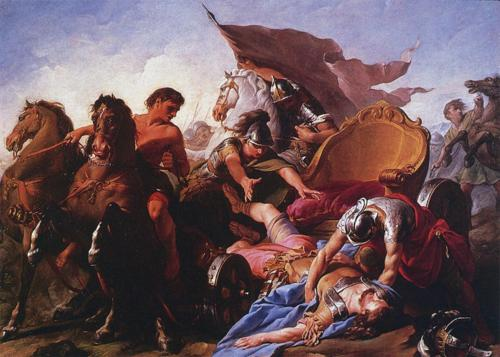
Antiochus falling from his chariot, painting by Noël Hallé, ca. 1738

Antiochus recognized the potential danger in the east but was unwilling to give up control of Judea. He sent a commander named Lysias to deal with the Maccabees, while Antiochus himself led the main Seleucid army against the Parthians. Antiochus had initial success in his eastern campaign, capturing king Artaxias and reconquering the Kingdom of Armenia. His campaign went through Ecbatana and he and his forces attacked Persepolis but were driven off by the populace. On his return home, he died at Isfahan in 164 BC.

Various religious explanations exist for Antiochus IV's death. Apparently, he attacked a temple of the Mesopotamian deity Nanaya in Persia shortly before his demise, and his death was possibly attributed to impiety and punishment by Nanaya in some quarters. Jewish sources gave credit for Antiochus's death to his earlier impiety at the Temple of Jerusalem. When read literally, there is an apparent contradiction between the books of 1 & 2 Maccabees. The Book of 1 Maccabees places the death of Antiochus IV shortly after the reconsecration of the Jewish temple, while 2 Maccabees places the death of the king before the reconsecration of the temple. Some scholars have theorized that the "abomination" torn down in 1 Maccabees 6:7 was due to a form of civil unrest, and the true reconsecration of the temple occurred after the death of Antiochus IV. According to 2 Maccabees, he died from divinely-inflicted disease:

But the all-seeing Lord, the God of Israel, struck him with an incurable and invisible blow. As soon as he stopped speaking he was seized with a pain in his bowels, for which there was no relief, and with sharp internal tortures—and that very justly, for he had tortured the bowels of others with many and strange inflictions. Yet he did not in any way stop his insolence, but was even more filled with arrogance, breathing fire in his rage against the Jews, and giving orders to drive even faster. And so it came about that he fell out of his chariot as it was rushing along, and the fall was so hard as to torture every limb of his body. Thus he who only a little while before had thought in his superhuman arrogance that he could command the waves of the sea, and had imagined that he could weigh the high mountains in a balance, was brought down to earth and carried in a litter, making the power of God manifest to all. And so the ungodly man's body swarmed with worms, and while he was still living in anguish and pain, his flesh rotted away, and because of the stench the whole army felt revulsion at his decay.

— 2 Maccabees 9:5–9 (NRSV)

According to the later rabbinical work, the scroll of Antiochus (Megillat Antiochus), when Antiochus heard that his army had been defeated in Judea, he boarded a ship and fled to the coastal cities. Wherever he came the people rebelled and called him "The Fugitive," so he drowned himself in the sea. This story is from the 2nd century, however, much further removed from the event than Polybius or 2 Maccabees. It is generally considered secondary and unlikely to be accurate.

== Legacy ==
=== Historiography ===
The most important ancient non-Jewish source on Antiochus IV is the Greek historian Polybius, generally considered one of the highest-quality sources on the time period. Polybius paints a negative picture of him, and other surviving accounts have as well. The negative accounts of the Jews in the Books of the Maccabees are also influential. On the basis of this, Antiochus IV has generally been judged poorly. There are historians who think that these hostile depictions deserve some skepticism, however. Not all ancient accounts are hostile; the historian Appian does not say anything particularly bad about Antiochus IV, in contrast. Polybius does not appear to be neutral on this issue, as he was good friends with Antiochus IV's nephew and rival Demetrius I; the two both spent years in exile in Rome. The Achaean League which Polybius hailed from was also traditionally hostile to the Seleucid Empire. Polybius was, like many of the educated upper class, something of an elitist. So stories related by Polybius such as those of Antiochus IV frolicking with commoners at taverns may have soured his reputation in antiquity, even though modern values would find this kind of behavior unobjectionable.

The historian Dov Gera writes in defense of Antiochus IV that he was a "talented and accomplished politician" and that "the negative portrait of him painted by Polybius was influenced by political considerations of his friends... and should not be trusted." There is also some evidence on this: historian Nick Sekunda notes that Alexander Balas successfully challenged King Demetrius for leadership of the Seleucid Empire decades later in 152 BC while claiming to be an unknown son of Antiochus IV. This claim appears to have been useful to him, suggesting Antiochus IV was remembered fondly by at least some.

Even 1 Maccabees, an extremely hostile source, has Antiochus IV wonder on his deathbed why calamity has struck him when he was "well-loved in the day of my power". According to the Book of 1 Maccabees, Antiochus IV eventually comes to believe that these misfortunes were the result of the persecution of the Jewish people that he orchestrated in Jerusalem.

=== Jewish tradition ===
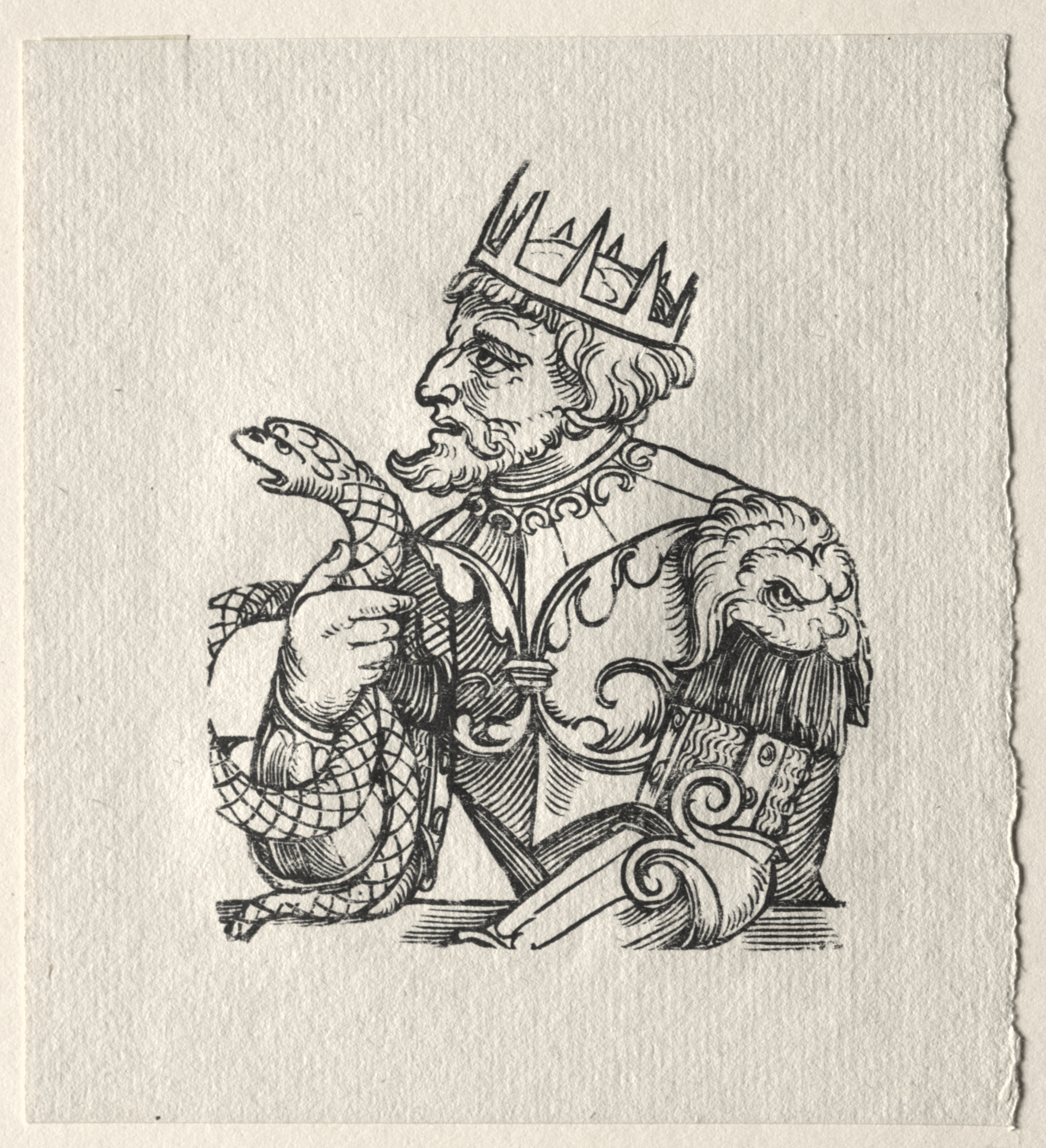
Woodcut depicting Antiochus by Georg Pencz

Antiochus IV is remembered as a major villain and persecutor in the Jewish traditions associated with Hanukkah, including the Books of the Maccabees and the "Scroll of Antiochus". Rabbinical sources refer to him as הרשע harasha ("the wicked"). The Jewish Encyclopedia concluded that "[s]ince Jewish and heathen sources agree in their characterization of him, their portrayal is evidently correct", summarizing this portrayal as one of a cruel and vainglorious ruler who tried to force on all the peoples of his realm a Hellenic culture, "the true essence of which he can scarcely be said to have appreciated". Josephus writing in Antiquities of the Jews describes Antiochus IV desecrating the Second Jewish Temple and renaming it "The Temple of Jupiter Hellenius". Antiochus IV is also described by Josephus as executing anyone performing Jewish practices or in possession of Jewish texts in addition to circumcised males.

== See also ==
- Abomination of desolation
- List of Syrian monarchs
- Seleucid army

== Notes ==
Antiochus IV Epiphanes Seleucid dynasty Born: 215 BC Died: 164 BC
Preceded by Antiochus	Seleucid King (King of Syria); 175–164 BC	Succeeded by Antiochus V Eupator
