= 4QMMT =

One of the Dead Sea scrolls

4QMMT

4QMMT, also known as MMT, or the Halakhic Letter, is a reconstructed text from manuscripts that were part of the Dead Sea Scrolls discovered at Qumran in the Judean desert. The manuscript fragments used to reconstruct 4QMMT were found in Cave 4 at Qumran in 1953–1959, and kept at the Palestinian Archaeological Museum, now known as the Rockefeller Museum in Jerusalem.

The sigla "4QMMT" designates a reconstructed text from manuscripts found in Cave 4 at Qumran. The document was provisionally designated "4QMishnique" (Mishnah) by Józef Milik. The designation at final publication was "4QMMT" (Miqsat Ma’ase ha-Torah, Hebrew for "Some Precepts of the Torah" or "Some Rulings Pertaining to the Torah"). This title can also be translated as "Works of the Law". Some New Testament scholars identified the connections of this document with the ideas reflected in Pauline theology.

The two primary scholars who identified, reconstructed, and published 4QMMT are John Strugnell and Elisha Qimron, the official editors of these manuscripts.

== Manuscripts of 4QMMT ==
=== Reconstructed composite text ===
4QMMT is a reconstructed composite text from fragments of six separate manuscripts discovered in Cave 4 of Qumran. The six fragmented manuscripts are designated 4Q394, 4Q395, 4Q396, 4Q397, 4Q398, and 4Q399. Five of the manuscripts were written and preserved on parchment (4Q394, 4Q395, 4Q396, 4Q397, and 4Q399); and one was written on papyri (4Q398). All six manuscripts are also fragmented (e.g., 4Q397, the most fragmented of these scrolls consists of 68 small fragments).

These manuscripts are also separately designated as 4QMMT^{a–f} with 4QMMT^{a} designating manuscript 4Q394, and continuing in series concluding with 4QMMT^{f} designating manuscript 4Q399.

=== Dating the original composition ===
Strugnell and Qimron date the original composition of 4QMMT at c. 150 BCE. This early date is proposed based on an evaluation of its content. The congenial tone of the letter from the author to the recipients suggests a composition of the text to a time either before or contemporaneous with the earliest organizational stages of the Qumran community. From other texts discovered at Qumran and associated with the Qumran community, scholars believe the Yahad (the Qumran community) had a more hostile attitude to the religious leaders at the Jerusalem Temple and that they were prohibited from corresponding with the Jerusalem leaders.

Lawrence Schiffman dates 4QMMT to c. 152 BCE when the Hasmonean dynasty took over the high priesthood and began to follow temple practices identified as pharisaic by later sources. This text is a challenge to the leaders of the Jerusalem Temple regarding their understanding of these purity regulations identified as those of the Pharisees.

Hanan Eshel dates the composition of 4QMMT to c. 152 BCE, the beginning of the rise to power of Jonathan Apphus.

=== Dating ===
Palaeographic analysis dates the six copies of 4QMMT to between 75 BCE and 50 CE (Kampen and Bernstein). However, linguistic analysis, which shows traces of early Second Temple period language and usage, suggests that the six copies provenance an older original, perhaps as early as 150 BCE. Although the original composition of the text is about 150 BCE, estimates of the dates of the copying of these particular six manuscripts range from 75 BCE to 50 CE.

Palaeographic analysis of the manuscripts of 4QMMT was performed by Strugnell and Qimron, with Ada Yardeni, who analyzed manuscripts 4Q397 and 4Q398. They dated the manuscripts palaeographically to the early or mid-Herodian period. Frank Moore Cross had given one of the 4QMMT manuscripts a late Hasmonean date. These dates place the texts between the early 1st century BCE and the late 1st century CE.

== Publication ==
In 1959, John Strugnell was assigned the task of publishing the manuscripts that make up the text of 4QMMT. In 1979, Hebrew scholar Elisha Qimron joined him to assist in the publication of 4QMMT.

The text was officially published in 1994, in the series Discoveries in the Judean Desert. In the series, Discoveries in the Judean Desert, photographs of all the fragments were published for the first time with transcriptions of the manuscripts and a composite text based on all of the available manuscripts.

The first public knowledge of the manuscripts of 4QMMT came in 1984 at the International Congress on Biblical Archaeology, a conference held in Jerusalem. Qimron informed the conference that he and Strugnell possessed and would publish what is now 4QMMT.

The text was the subject of a legal dispute in the early 1990s when Qimron successfully sued Hershel Shanks of the Biblical Archaeology Society and others for a claim of copyright after they published his reconstruction of 4QMMT out of 70 fragments, without his permission.

== Content ==
=== Authors and recipients ===
The text appears to be sent from the leader of the Qumran community to the leaders of the priestly establishment in Jerusalem. When the general substance of this manuscript was first announced to the public, this text was understood to be a letter written by the founder of the Qumran community, the Teacher of Righteousness, to his opponent the Wicked Priest, in order to explain the reasons for the Qumran community's existence. The purpose of the letter was to spell out the differences between the two parties, the Qumran community and the authorities at the Jerusalem Temple, and to summon the leadership of the Jerusalem Temple to a stricter interpretation and application of certain laws. This announcement by Qimron was recognized as significant because it showed that important information about the Qumran community had not yet been published.

=== Genre ===
The genre of the text was initially identified by Strugnell and Qimron as a personal letter. The editors described the text as a letter by the leader of the Qumran community, possibly even by the Teacher of Righteousness, to the leader of its opponents, a high priest in Jerusalem. Both later rejected this view.

=== Structure ===
4QMMT is structured in three sections. Section A is the introduction or incipit, section B is the main body of the letter that contains a series of interpretations of Jewish law (Halakhah), and section C is the conclusion.

4QMMT A commences with a discussion of how to calculate the Jewish calendar

4QMMT B is the main body of the text with a discussion of Jewish laws.

4QMMT C is the conclusion of the letter.

=== Content ===
==== 4QMMT A – Introduction ====
The content of section A includes a discussion of the Jewish calendar describing a 364-day solar calendar that would replace the lunar calendar used by Temple priests. The lunar calendar caused certain Jewish festivals requiring harvests and sacrifices to fall on the Sabbath. The reconstructed text includes a discussion of how to calculate the calendar, but not all agree this is a proper part of the text. A significant point of contention between various Jewish groups at the time concerned the proper way to establish a calendar. The calendar was a central matter of dispute because it changed the date on which the major Jewish holidays would be celebrated.

==== 4QMMT B – Halakhah ====
The manuscript identifies twenty-two laws (Halakhah) that concern sacrificial laws, priestly gifts, ritual purity, and other matters. The text is a polemical argument setting forth the views of the Qumran leadership and calling on their opponents to accept their views. It presents twenty-two points of the Halakhah, the Jewish law, on which the Qumran community differs from the religious leaders of the Jerusalem Temple. These points of Halakhah generally oppose Pharisaic views and coincide with Sadducean positions. This led scholars to the conclusion that the community at Qumran were the Essenes who had withdrawn from Jerusalem about 150 BCE, following disagreements with the Sadducean Jewish authorities concerning religious practices and their understanding of the Halakhah.

==== 4QMMT C – Conclusion ====
4QMMT C is the conclusion in which the author of the text, the leader of the Qumran community, encourages his addressees to modify their understanding Halakhah to conform to his view. The title of the document, MMT, comes from line C26 which uses the words "Miqsat Ma’ase ha-Torah", Hebrew for "Some Precepts of the Torah".

== Interpretation ==
The majority view is that the Qumran community is to be identified with the Essenes. If this is correct, then 4QMMT helps scholars understand the issues that may have caused the Essene community to separate themselves from the Jerusalem Temple and move to Qumran.

While part of 4QMMT seems to be addressed to priests at the Temple in Jerusalem, the third section is addressed to a respected individual, whose honesty and integrity are acknowledged by the author, encouraging him to study carefully 'the book of Moses and the books of the Prophets and David.' He also refers to the blessings and curses on the Israelite kings and asks the recipient to remember their actions, giving the impression that the recipient may himself be a Judaean monarch. Almost certainly a Hasmonean ruler is being addressed. There is no formal breach between the two, only disagreement, giving rise to the suspicion that 4QMMT may have been written at a time of dispute between the Qumran community and the Judaean political and religious establishment in Jerusalem, concerning Halakhah. Some scholars believe that this section is a letter from the Teacher of Righteousness to the Wicked Priest, believed by many to be Jonathan Apphus or his brother Simon.

Other scholars have seen in 4QMMT evidence of having been written solely by the Sadducees, one of the major religious factions in Judea at that time.

Since its publication in 1994, there has been much debate about whether 4QMMT really is a letter, and if so, from whom to whom; whether it is actually a Sadducean manuscript; and even whether the document has been properly reconstructed. Hanne von Weissenberg's book, 4QMMT: Reevaluating the Text, the Function, and the Meaning of the Epilogue, maintains that Qimron and Strugnell define the genre of 4QMMT as a letter, yet they want to clarify that this is perhaps more than just a letter, but perhaps a public letter or treaty with another community. According to Strugnell, the Halakhic Letter is neither a letter nor a treatise. He argues that the introduction to the letter does not resemble a letter at all, but suggests the introduction is a possible collection of laws, sent to a particular person.

John Kampen and Moshe Bernstein support the idea of 4QMMT being a letter in their analysis of the document in their introduction of Reading 4QMMT. They maintain that Strugnell's argument that the document is a collection of laws is false, due to the argumentative tone it gives off. Instead they believe 4QMMT to be a text which deals with legal disputes among two parties. Furthermore, they advocate the idea that the document's epilogue and final sections blur the interpretations of the classification of 4QMMT's genre.

=== Pauline theology ===
The title of this document can also be translated as 'Works of the Torah', or 'Works of the Law'. This expression aroused particular interest on the part of the New Testament scholars because the parallel Greek concept 'ἔργα νόμου' (erga nomou), is central to Pauline theology.

For example, Martin Abegg (2012) writes that Paul, using the same terminology, is actually rebutting the theology of documents such as MMT.

"MMT is couched in the exact language of what Paul was rebutting in his letter to the Galatians. MMT claims that adherence to the works of the law “will be accounted to you as righteousness”; Paul’s answer is that “No human being is justified by works of the law but only through faith in Jesus Christ” (Galatians 2:16)"

== See also ==
- Pesher
- Tanakh at Qumran
