= Robert Eisenman =

American biblical scholar (born 1937)

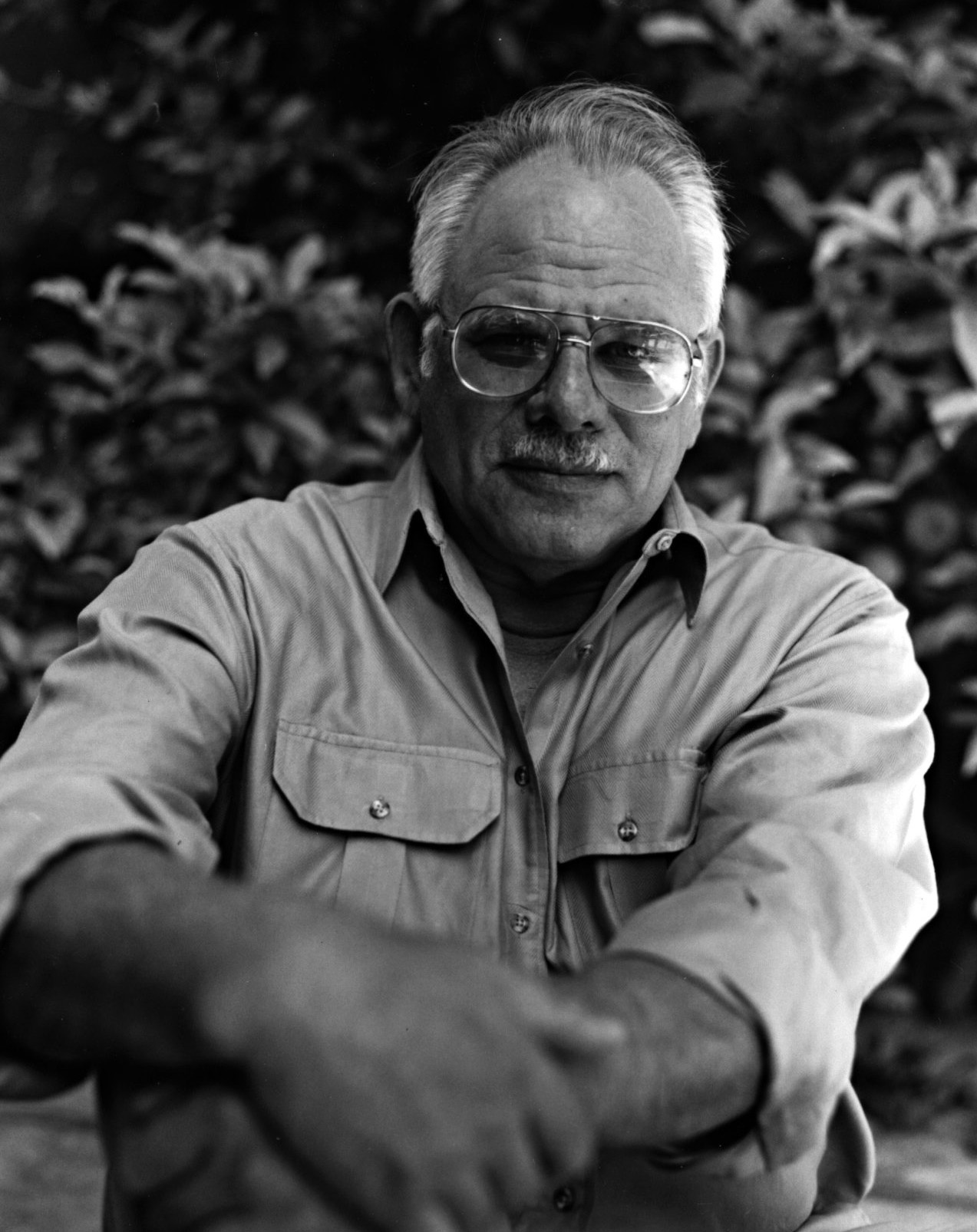
- Born: 1937 (age 88–89); South Orange, New Jersey, U.S.
- Education: Cornell University (B.A., Physics and Philosophy, 1958); New York University (M.A., Hebrew and Near Eastern Studies, 1966); Columbia University (PhD, Middle East Languages and Cultures, 1971)
- Occupations: author, professor, biblical scholar
- Known for: works on Christianity and the Dead Sea Scrolls
- Relatives: Peter Eisenman (brother)
- Website: roberteisenman.com

Robert Eisenman (born 1937) is an American biblical scholar. He is currently professor of Middle East religions, archaeology, and Islamic law and director of the Institute for the Study of Judaeo-Christian Origins at California State University Long Beach.

Eisenman led the campaign to free up access to the Dead Sea Scrolls in the 1980s and 90s, and, as a result of this campaign, is associated with the theory that combines Essenes with Palestinian messianism (or what some refer to as "Palestinian Christianity") – a theory opposed to establishment or consensus scholarship.

Before this, Eisenman spent five years travelling in the United States, Europe, and the Middle East as far as India, encapsulating all these things in his poetic travel Diario (1959–62), published in 2007 by North Atlantic Books, Berkeley, California and called The New Jerusalem, in which he describes the San Francisco "Beat" scene in 1958–59, Paris when still a "moveable feast", working on kibbutzim in Israel, the Peace Corps, and several voyages on the overland route to India.

== Life and career ==
Robert Eisenman is from New Jersey. He was born to assimilated Jewish parents. His brother is deconstructionist architect Peter Eisenman – who designed the Holocaust Memorial in Berlin, the Visitor Center at Santiago de Compostela in Spain, and the Arizona Cardinal Football Stadium.

=== Education ===
Eisenman majored for two and a half years in Engineering Physics (a course which was intended to prepare students to enter nuclear physics), graduated B.A. from Cornell University in Physics and Philosophy in 1958. He received an M.A. Degree in Hebrew and Near Eastern Studies with Abraham I. Katsh from New York University in 1966. He received a PhD Degree from Columbia University in Middle East languages and cultures in 1971 with a minor in Jewish Studies and a major in Islamic law, where he studied with Joseph Schacht.

He was a National Endowment for the Humanities fellow at the American Schools of Oriental Research, Jerusalem, Israel, 1985–86 and, in 1986–87, he was a senior research fellow at the Oxford Centre for Hebrew and Jewish Studies, Oxford, England.

=== Current position ===
He is professor of Middle East religions, archaeology, and Islamic law and the director of the Institute for the Study of Judeo-Christian and Islamic Origins at California State University Long Beach. He is also a visiting senior member of Linacre College, Oxford University, and was a National Endowment for the Humanities fellow at the Albright Institute of Archaeological Research (American Schools of Oriental Research) in Jerusalem.

=== Early life ===
Eisenman grew up in South Orange, New Jersey and went to Columbia High School in Maplewood, but skipped his senior year to take up an acceptance in the Engineering Physics Department at Cornell University. In his junior year Eisenman moved, first to Philosophy to study with Max Black, then on to Comparative Literature with John Senior, and then back to Philosophy to graduate in 1958 with a major in Aesthetics and a minor in Physics.

=== On the road internationally (1958–63) ===
Eisenman left college and immediately took to the road (it was the time of Jack Kerouac's On the Road published the previous year, 1957), but now not nationally, internationally. People who knew him then say he was the first to introduce American tennis shoes – substitutes for his college "white bucks" – as white walking shoes to Europe (see the picture at right) and the first American "backpacker" they ever saw (Australians, New Zealanders, and assorted Europeans had been doing it earlier).

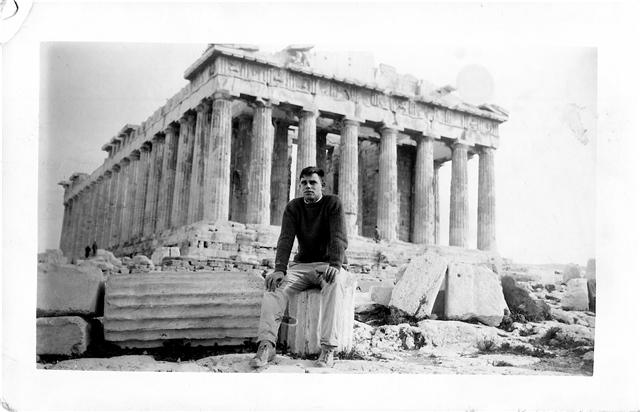
Eisenman before the Parthenon, December 1958

Stopping in Paris, he spent the fall in Alt-Aussee in Austria; and from there to Vienna and down to Greece, to Athens and ultimately Hydra Island, where he was entertained by the Norwegian writer and poet Axel Jensen and his wife Marianne (later immortalized by Leonard Cohen in his song “So Long, Marianne”).

Having been accepted for graduate study in Comparative Literature at UC Berkeley, Eisenman returned to the U.S. via Paris and Cape Cod and ultimately went across the country by Greyhound Bus to San Francisco where he found a room on Russian Hill and tested the scene at North Beach. When he finally went across the Bay to register at UC Berkeley, what he saw reminded him so much of Cornell (Bermuda shorts, bobby socks, fraternities/sororities, etc. – this was a decade before the Free Speech Movement there) that he ripped up his computer punch cards right on the Registration line in the Armory and tossed them into a wastepaper basket.

He then hitchhiked back across the country and returned to Paris. From 1959 to 1960, Eisenman stayed at "the Beat Hotel” where he encountered the likes of William Burroughs, Gregory Corso, et al., but he was not really interested in these sorts of persons or their scene. All this he documents in The New Jerusalem: A Millennium Poetic/Prophetic Travel Diario, 1959–62, published in 2007 and taken directly from the free verse notebooks he kept during this period, which he in his "Introduction" and his publishers on the back cover both call "an Anti-Beat Manifesto".

He then went on to Israel and Jerusalem, where he had the epiphany of encountering members of his family of whom he had previously never heard (his great grandfather had gone to Jerusalem at the time of the Turks and was one of the founders of the Bikur Holim Hospital there, while his two oldest sons left him in Istanbul and came directly to America), worked on Kibbutzim in the Galilee (1960–61 – he had previously worked on John F. Kennedy's 1960 Campaign,) and finally went back to join the first Peace Corps Group to go into the field. This trained at the International House at UC Berkeley, so he was back to where he had started out; but while they went on to meet Kennedy on the White House lawn and to Ghana, he was flown back to New York City because, as he saw it, he was on his way to India and the East not Africa.

Resuming his "Passage to India", he returned to Paris, and then on to kibbutzim in Galilee again. The next Spring, after staying in monasteries throughout Israel, and a climactic fight with the future Israeli "Peace Pilot" at the California Café in Tel Aviv; Eisenman made the last overland run from Cyprus, across Turkey, Iran, Beluchistan, and Pakistan by bus, train, and boat to India, where he ended his journey as a guest of, and sleeping in, the Jewish Synagogue of New Delhi, most of whose members were up in the Simla Hill States because it was high summer and monsoon. He returned to Paris over the Indian Ocean, up the Red Sea, and across the Mediterranean.

== Release of the Dead Sea Scrolls ==
From about 1986 onwards, Eisenman became the leading figure in the struggle to release and free the Dead Sea Scrolls. The Scrolls had been discovered from 1948 to 1956 in several waves, but after a suggestive article by literary critic Edmund Wilson in The New Yorker magazine, editing more or less ground to a halt from about 1959 onwards.

This is not to say the Scrolls were not out. The Israelis had been very forthcoming with the first Scrolls that came into their possession from Cave I. It was the Scrolls from later caves discovered like III–XI, which came in after 1948 and Partition and on-site excavations by persons like Dominican Father Roland de Vaux, which were the problem. In 1985–86, Eisenman, who had written his first book presenting, as he called it, "A New Theory of Qumran Origins" in 1983 and a follow-up on James as Righteous Teacher in 1985, received a National Endowment for the Humanities Fellowship at the Albright Institute of Archaeological Research in Jerusalem (also known as "the American School") where Cave I Scrolls had first come in and been photographed in 1947–48.

Ostensibly he was to work on a project comparing the Jerusalem Community of James the Just to the Community at Qumran, but while at the American Schools of Oriental Research (then the Albright Institute) he found that there was nothing he could do – all paths being barred to him. Notwithstanding, he and a colleague, Philip Davies of Sheffield University, England, went in to see one of the curators of the Shrine of the Book and were told categorically, "You will not see the Scrolls in your lifetime". Subsequently, he came into possession of the complete computer print-out of all the Scrolls in possession of the Israel Antiquities Authority, both those before 1967 and those afterwards at the Rockefeller Museum and, not three years later, a complete photographic archive of all previously unpublished materials from Cave IV all the way up to Cave XI.

He sent a copy of this computer-generated print-out to the editor of Biblical Archaeology Review, Hershel Shanks, which created a huge stir in the office and the campaign to free the Scrolls really began in earnest.

During his stay at Oxford University as a senior fellow at the Oxford Centre for Hebrew and Jewish Studies and a visiting senior member of Linacre College in 1986–87, a colleague had also passed him a xerox copy of 4QMMT, a document which had been talked about but which no one outside the inner circle had ever been allowed to see. This, too, he freely shared with anyone who wanted to see it as part of the campaign, and, thereafter, it made the rounds.

At this time, too, he brought James Robinson – a colleague of his at Claremont University and the editor of the Nag Hammadi Codices (a dispute similar to the Qumran one) – into the mix and together they took the decision to publish all the unpublished photographs. This amounted to 1785 plates. The original publication (in microfiche form) was supposed to occur in April, 1991 through EJ Brill in Leiden, the Netherlands.

However, a few weeks before publication, Brill's representative had attended a Scrolls Conference in Madrid, Spain and mistook the uproar there over Kapera's publication the year before in Poland of the samizdat copy of 4QMMT he had received from Davies for a dispute over freedom of access to the Scrolls generally. Following this, newly appointed Israeli representatives came to Leiden and talked the Brill publishers out of the Eisenman/Robinson microfiche project and into a newly conceived one of their own. So Eisenman and Robinson had to fall back on the offices of Hershel Shanks and the Biblical Archaeology Society who were unwilling to go to press before October/November of that year. The publication was contracted by public interest attorney William John Cox.

While all these things were going on, Eisenman had been invited to become a consultant to the Huntington Library in San Marino, California, which had become aware that it had in its archive a collection of photographs of all the Dead Sea Scrolls, donated to it by Elizabeth Bechtel. The late William Moffett, its director, asked whether he thought the library should open its archive to all scholars. He was projecting this for September, two months before Eisenman's and Robinson's own projected B.A.S. Edition. Eisenman encouraged him to do so, though he knew the library would get most of the credit for breaking the monopoly and Robinson and he very little.

== Surveys, groundscans, and excavations ==
Since 1988, Eisenman has led the Judean Desert Explorations/Excavations Project under the auspices of the Institute for the Study of Judeo-Christian Origins at CSULB he headed. These expeditions included students from CSULB and other institutions. Its aim was to search for possible new caves that might contain scrolls. It was his feeling that, though the Bedouins in their enthusiasm to find artifacts had clearly been in almost all accessible caves, there might have been others, inaccessible to them or hidden in some manner or cave-ins. These were the best possibilities of finding new scrolls.

In the first expedition, between 1988 and 1989, he and his students were involved in the excavation of a cave a kilometer or two south of Qumran, in which they found some Bronze Age artifacts, including an arrow that had evidently been shot into the cave, which still displayed its lacquer rings and feather marks, an oil jug, and the wooden remains possibly of a plough.

From 1989 to 1992 Eisenman and his students conducted a walking survey of the entire Dead Sea shore and its environs from seven kilometers north of Qumran to thirty-five kilometers south, past Wadi Murabba'at, to the northern limits of Ein Gedi, mapping the whole area. In this survey they went into some 485 caves and depressions.

In 1990–91, with the help of author Michael Baigent and radar groundscan specialist Tony Wood, he conducted the first radar groundscan of the Qumran plateau, its ruins and, in particular, the top of the various marls, including Caves 4–6 where he felt there was the best chance of finding hidden pockets that previously might not have been visible. Ground-scanning on the marls and below Cave VI did point to several such pockets and seemingly empty areas in the marls adjoining Cave IV.

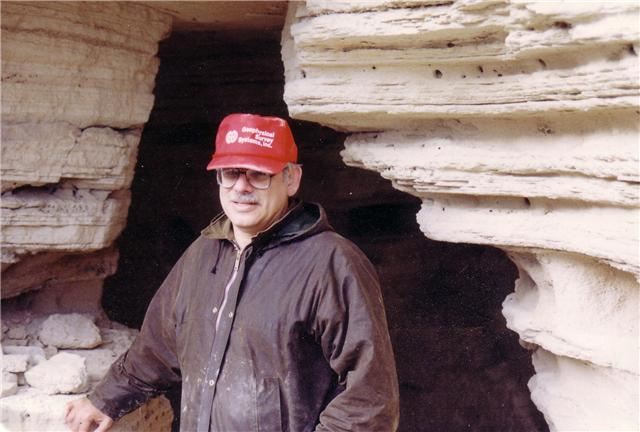
Eisenman on first Qumran Radar Ground-scan Expedition standing in face of Cave 4, 1990–91

In 2001–03, his teams joined an expedition led by Hanan Eshel and Magen Broshi and sponsored by John Merrill and the B.A.S. In the course of this expedition, two of his students, Dennis Walker and Ron Dubay, excavated a small building on the eastern edge of the Qumran Cemetery. They found that it contained bones: two secondary burials (and the next year one primary burial was uncovered beneath this). The next year everyone went back to do more work on the enclosure and the bones it contained and to further survey the graveyard at Qumran, which evolved into the first comprehensive map of the Qumran settlement and adjacent cemetery.

In 2004, they had the opportunity to return and investigate the empty areas in the marls of Cave IV, but with little result.

== Theories ==
=== Dead Sea Scrolls ===
Eisenman claims that the preconceptions of the group of scholars around Father Roland De Vaux who first worked on the Dead Sea Scrolls led them to erroneously date the non-biblical, sectarian community documents to the Maccabean period, and to read them as the writings of a serene, retiring community of Essene monks exiled to the wilderness in the course of a dispute with the reigning priesthood of the day led by the "Wicked Priest"/"Spouter of Lying."

Eisenman reads the attitude of these documents as militant, nationalistic and zealous and places them not in the Maccabean period but the later, Herodian era (c. 35 BCE to 70 CE and beyond), which means the establishment priesthood that they opposed was the collaborating, compromising, corrupt Herodian priesthood. He sees parallels between the political, religious and ethical stance of these sectarian documents and that of James the brother of Jesus, whom he identifies as the scrolls' Teacher of Righteousness, and sees 'the Wicked Priest' and 'the Man of Lying' as two different adversaries of the Scroll community, the Wicked Priest being the High Priest Ananus ben Ananus, James' executioner, and the Man of Lying, Paul the Apostle.

He is critical of the ways radiocarbon dating and paleography have been employed to date the Dead Sea Scrolls, and relies instead on his interpretation of the content of the scrolls despite this being at a clash with scientific consensus. He claims to find parallels between the James-Jesus first-century milieu and the scrolls' repeated allusion to "the Star Prophecy", the aggressiveness of the War Scroll and similar documents, the hiding of the Jerusalem Temple treasure as delineated in the Copper Scroll, the description of foreign armies (the Kittim) invading on a much more massive scale than any Hellenistic invasion during the Maccabean period, and the reference to themselves several times as "the Congregation," "Church of the Poor" and Ebionites ("the Poor"), the name of James' community as described in Early Church literature and by Paul. Eisenman lays particular emphasis on the scroll community's description of the Kittim's military and religious practices in their interpretation of Habakkuk 2:2–2:4 (the Habakkuk Commentary) as "sacrificing to their standards and worshiping their weapons of War", and their reference to Roman “tax-farming” across the whole of the civilized world.

==== Interpretation of Habakkuk 2:4 at Qumran ====
The recourse to an interpretation of Habakkuk 2:4 ("the Righteous shall live by his Faith"), the center piece and real building block of all Christian theology both in the Pauline corpus (Romans, Galatians, et al.) and in the Epistle of James he sees as proof positive that these documents were written more or less contemporaneously and at a time when this prophecy or proof-text was in play.

In addition, he sees the interpretation in the Habakkuk Commentary at Qumran, seemingly written in the latter part of the Community's history and witnessing its fall and the fall of the Jerusalem Temple (c. 70 CE), as 'Jamesian' as opposed to 'Pauline'. That is, first of all it is confined to "Jews" or, in the language of the Commentary, "the House of Judah", and second of all, it applies only to "Torah-doing" Jews ("doing" here, the basis of the Hebrew word for "works" throughout the Qumran corpus and also being an extremely important usage in the Epistle of James), that is, it does not apply to "non-Torah-doing Jews" and certainly not "non-Torah-doing Gentiles."

For Eisenman this is a direct riposte and a rejection of the Pauline interpretation of this prophecy, and the basis of the Pauline theology one finds in Galatians and Romans and actually, in fact, seemingly argued against in the extant Epistle of James whether seen as authentic, not authentic, or just part of 'the Jamesian School'; and, therefore, Eisenman claims, a chronological indicator for the document as a whole.

Finally, he points to the fact that there are even collections of messianic proof-texts at Qumran which include, for instance, the Star Prophecy of Numbers 24:17 which Josephus, at the end of the Jewish War, singles out as the reason for the outbreak of the revolt, and even one dedicated to "the Promises to the Seed" or "House of David". For Eisenman the Dead Sea Scrolls are Messianic, it being not properly appreciated just how messianic the Scrolls actually are. They represent "the literature of the Messianic Movement in Palestine" which he prefers to the usage "Christianity in Palestine".

Though one might call them “Essene”, one must take the definition for this from what the Scrolls themselves say, not necessarily what others think or say the Essenes were. Hippolytus, for instance, possibly preserving an alternate version of Josephus, thinks there are two or even three groups of "Essenes", “Zealot” or “Sicarii Essenes", and for Eisenman, this is a better definition of what the Essenes were than the more normative ones people are familiar with. For him the Essenes are what Christians were in Palestine before 'the Movement' went overseas and was Paulinized, turning it into the mirror opposite of what it was in Palestine before the fall of the Temple.

For him, Acts confirms this, averring that "Christians were first called Christians" in Antioch in Syria in the mid-Fifties AD. As opposed to this, he considers the more historically-oriented sectarian or later documents of the Dead Sea Scrolls to be the messianically inspired literature of a pietist, Law-oriented, and nationalistic Party in opposition to Roman/Herodian rule in Palestine which uses the language as "Sons of Zadok” (in some vocabularies, “Sadducees”) or “Zaddikim (צדיקים),” a derivate usage, in referring to itself or even "Messianic Sadducees", as opposed to "Herodian Sadducees" pictured in both the New Testament and Josephus.

==== Call for AMS carbon dating ====
With his attempts to get free access to the Scrolls, Eisenman claims he was the first to call for AMS Carbon dating the Dead Sea Scrolls (the earliest carbon dating tests – non-AMS – were performed 14 November 1950 on a piece of linen from Qumran Cave 1, producing a date range being 167 BCE – 233 CE.) Libby had first started using the dating method in 1946 and early testing required relatively large samples that were destroyed, so testing on scrolls only became feasible when methods used in the dating process were improved upon. F. E. Zeuner carried out tests on date palm wood from the Qumran site yielding a date range of 70 BCE – 90 CE. In 1963 Libby tested a sample from the Isaiah Scroll, which gave a range between 200 BCE – 1 CE. This proposal was contained in a series of letters to John Strugnell, Eisenman wrote with Philip R. Davies of Sheffield University in England and copied to Amir Drori, the head of the Israel Antiquities Authority.

Not two months after he and Davies made this request to the Antiquities Authority, to which they attached a recent article about AMS radiocarbon techniques, it announced its intention to run just such tests. Eisenman was not mentioned as having initiated the tests. He and Davies had included in their letter to the IAA a caveat, that "Opposition Scholars" be included in process because they claimed it was they who felt the most need for the tests and they who could identify which documents should be tested. Nevertheless, Eisenman and Davies were not included in the testing process. Eisenman disputes the findings of these tests.

=== James ===
As far as Eisenman is concerned, James the Just, the individual Paul actually refers to as either "brother of Jesus" or "the brother of the Lord", is the historical character who exhibits the most in common with "the Teacher of Righteousness" pictured at Qumran and he considers that these events are the ones vividly portrayed in the Habakkuk Commentary. Historically speaking, it is this character who led the "Opposition Movement", including Essenes, Zealots, Sicarii, and/or Nazoreans – even Ebionites – and who, as “Zaddik" (צדיק), i. e., "the Zaddik of the Opposition Movement", about whom all these groups revolved until his death at the hands of the High Priest Ananus ben Ananus in 62 CE as described both in Josephus and Early Church literature. For him, the popularity of James and the illegality of the manner of his death at the hands of the Herodians, establishment High Priesthood, and Pharisees in 62 CE set the stage for and possibly even triggered the First Jewish Revolt against Rome in 66–73 CE – to say nothing of the fire in Rome, not long afterwards which, aside from his probably having set it himself, Nero was reported to have blamed on "Christians".

For his part, the Jewish historian Josephus makes it clear that those he is calling "Essenes" (as opposed to these same Herodians, Sadducees, and Pharisees) participated in the uprising, willing to undergo any torture or any form of death rather than "eat things sacrificed to idols" or "break the Law." For Eisenman, these "Nazoreans", (נצרים) "Zealots", (קנאים) "Zaddikim" (צדיקים) or "Ebionim" (אביונים) were marginalized by a Herodian named Saul (Paul) and the gentile Christians who followed him. This version of Christianity, as it later emerged from a gentile milieu as led by Paul, transformed the apocalyptic militancy of the Ebionite/Essene Zaddikim into a universalist peaceful doctrine. In this manner, Eisenman sees the doctrine of Christianity as largely the product of Pauline dialectic and apologetics. In so doing, Eisenman attempts to recover the authentic teaching of Jesus and/or James from the obscurity into which it seems to have been intentionally cast by resultant orthodoxy. As he puts it at the end of James the Brother of Jesus, once you have found the Historical James, you have found the Historical Jesus or alternatively, "who and whatever James was so too was Jesus".

Anthony J. Saldarini review of James the Brother of Jesus for the New York Times calls Eisenman's theories about James "bizarre" and "frequently inaccurate and biased" and he castigates the editors of his book for their lack of editorial supervision calling it "scandalous".

=== Paul as a Herodian ===
Eisenman identifies Paul as a Herodian, calling attention to Paul's peculiar version of Judaism. A presentation seeming to represent the interests of the Herodian dynasty in Palestine, as well as the intention to extend its influence into Asia Minor and further East into Northern Syria and Mesopotamia. He covered this in a series of papers and books beginning in 1984. Offered as proof is Paul's salutation (if authentic), at the end of the Letter to the Romans, where he sends greetings to his "kinsman Herodion" (i. e., "the Littlest Herod") and "all those in the Household of Aristobulus” (the putative son of Herod of Chalcis and the ultimate husband of the infamous Salome – in fact, their son was "the Littlest Herod").

Proof is also found in Josephus' picture of a curious member of the Herodian family, an individual he also calls "Saulos" who shares many characteristics in common with "Paul" in New Testament portraiture. Not only was this "Saulos" involved in an appeal of sorts to “Caesar,” he was also involved in violent behaviour in Jerusalem (although on the surface, at a somewhat later time); and it was he who made the final report to Nero in Corinth about the Roman reverses in Jerusalem which resulted in the dispatch of his best general Vespasian from Britain.

Finally he found Herodian traces in Paul's own outlook, his philosophy of "winning“ or being a "Jew to the Jews, a Law-keeper to the Law-keeper and a Law-breaker to the Law-breaker" also expressed in I Corinthians 9:19–27. In his own identification of himself as of "the Tribe of Benjamin” (Romans 11:1 and Philippians 3:5), a claim he might have felt Herodians, as Idumeans, were making for themselves, and his founding "a Community where Greeks and Jews could live in harmony, etc.,” where there were "no foreign visitors", as well as in the easy access he seems to have had to positions of power, and his own Roman citizenship.

Rounding out his arguments, Eisenman cites the matter of an unidentified "nephew" of Paul – seemingly the son of Paul's sister, resident in Jerusalem (Cypros married to the Temple Treasurer Helcias? – see the genealogies). This "nephew" has unfettered entrée to the Commander of the Roman garrison in the Tower of Antonia who, in turn, saves Paul from “Nazirite oath-taking" “Zealot”-like Jewish extremists who take an oath "not to eat or drink till they have killed Paul" (Acts 23:12–35). Eisenman identifies this individual as Julius Archelaus, the son of Saulos' sister, Cypros. Finally, consider Paul's Roman citizenship; the philosophy of paying the Roman tax to Caesar; and placing the Roman Law above the Jewish Law as an expression of "the Righteousness Commandment" of "loving your neighbor as yourself" (Romans 13:1–10).

=== First to call the James Ossuary fraudulent ===
Eisenman was the first to publicly claim that the James Ossuary was fraudulent when it originally surfaced in October 2002, doing so on the first day the story appeared in news articles published by the Associated Press and op-ed pieces in the Los Angeles Times. He did so on the basis of what the inscription actually said and not on the basis of scientific aids like those of palaeography or patina analysis (which Eisenman described as "new science" whose value he was unsure of), as well as the lack of "confirmed provenance ... and no authenticated chain of custody or transmission".

When he actually saw the ossuary at the AAR/SBL Conference in Toronto three weeks later, it was clear to Eisenman that there were two separate hands involved in the inscription, the second patently more cursive. He further argued that even if the "Jacob the Son of Joseph" part was authentic (there being plenty of ossuaries of this kind available around Jerusalem, "most not even inscribed and some never used"), the second "Brother of Jesus" part would have to have been added a substantial amount of time later, either in antiquity by a pious pilgrim or in modern times, by a not-very-sophisticated forger, because at the time (62 CE), Jesus – if he existed as such – would have been no more well known in Jerusalem than his putative brother James, and probably far less so; as such, there would have been no need to add such a rare cognomen except to please believers.

Moreover, as Eisenman wrote in his op-ed, he would have been much more impressed if the first part of the inscription had said "“James the son of Cleophas,” “Clopas or even “Alphaeus”", which is how individuals connected to this family were known in Palestine in this period and not the more theologically-consistent Joseph, which "is what a modern audience, schooled in the Gospels, would expect, not an ancient one". Additionally, if the ossuary had included the cognomen "the Zaddik" (הׂצדיק) or "Just One", "which is how many referred to him, including Hegesippus from the 2nd century and Eusebius from the 4th", Eisenman would have "more willingly credited it." Eisenman also pointed out that none of the ancient sources for James' burial mention an ossuary.

== Works ==
- Islamic Law in Palestine and Israel E.J. Brill, Leiden (1976)
- Maccabees, Zadokites, Christians and Qumran: A New Hypothesis of Qumran Origins E.J. Brill, Leiden (1984)
- James the Just in the Habakkuk Pesher E.J. Brill, Leiden (1986)
- A Facsimile Edition of the Dead Sea Scrolls (with James Robinson), Biblical Archaeology Society (1991)
- The Dead Sea Scrolls Uncovered (with Michael Wise), Penguin (1992) ISBN 1-85230-368-9
- James the Brother of Jesus: The Key to Unlocking the Secrets of early Christianity and the Dead Sea Scrolls (1997) ISBN 1-84293-026-5
- The Dead Sea Scrolls and the First Christians (1996) ISBN 1-85230-785-4
- The New Testament Code: The Cup of the Lord, the Damascus Covenant, and the Blood of Christ (2006) ISBN 1-84293-186-5
- The New Jerusalem: A Millennium Poetic/Prophetic Travel Diario 1959–1962 (2007) ISBN 1-55643-637-8
- James the Brother of Jesus and the Dead Sea Scrolls I, Grave Distractions Pub. (2012) ISBN 978-09855991-3-3
- James the Brother of Jesus and the Dead Sea Scrolls II, Grave Distractions Pub. (2012) ISBN 978-09855991-6-4
