= Prayer of Nabonidus =

The Prayer of Nabonidus is a legendary account preserved in Aramaic that describes the punishment and healing of the Babylonian king Nabonidus. In the Prayer of Nabonidus, the recovery from the imposed illness is attributed to the recognition of the God of the Jews as the highest and only god. The text has only been preserved in fragments of a single manuscript, which was found together with numerous other scrolls by Bedouins in 1952 in Cave 4 near Qumran on the Dead Sea. It is now in the possession of the Israel Museum.

== Manuscript 4Q242 ==
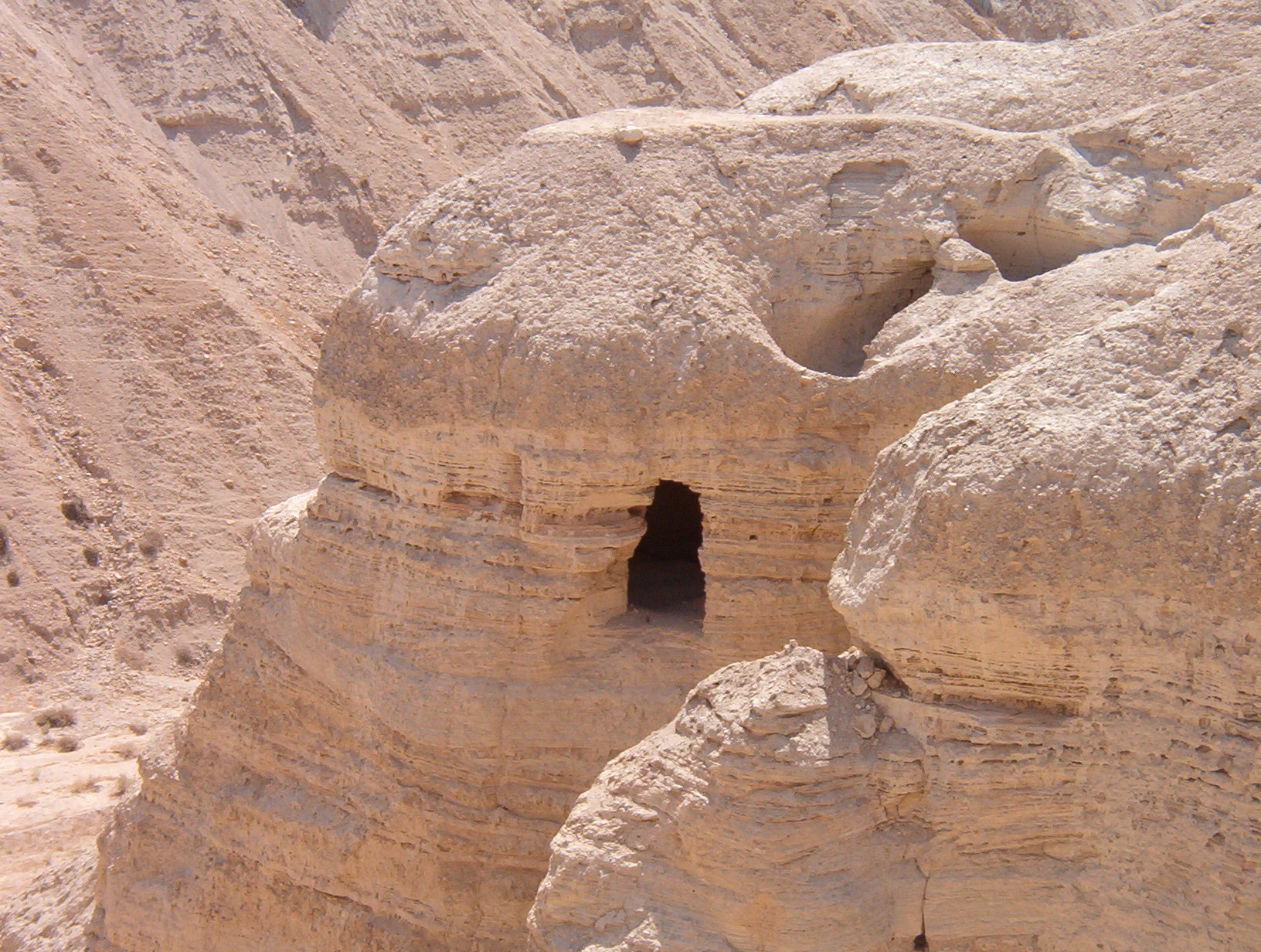
Cave 4 near the ruins of Qumran

The only surviving manuscript of the Prayer of Nabonidus bears the designation 4Q242 or 4QPrNab, where 4 stands for the number of the cave in which the manuscript was found, and 242 is a consecutive number. The surviving fragments can probably be divided into two columns: Fragments 1 to 3 form a column with some gaps, while fragment 4 is assumed to be an excerpt from another column or even another scroll due to its different material quality.

Fragment 1 measures approximately 8 × 8 cm and is composed of three parts. Fragment 2 is 4.5 cm high and 1.5 cm wide and consists of two parts. The third fragment measures approximately 1.5 × 2.5 cm. The relationship of fragment 1 to fragments 2a.b and 3, which are presumably to be read together, is disputed. While the first editor Józef Milik and Florentino García Martínez assumed a separation of a few letters, Frank Moore Cross tried to establish a direct connection between the fragments. J. Collins agreed with this in the edition of Discoveries in the Judaean Desert. This results in an approximate line length of between 115 and 125 mm, i.e. 39-43 letters. Remains of letters on nine lines have been preserved.

The right edge of the column is clearly preserved in fragment 1, possibly also the upper edge. Fragment 4 is of irregular shape. The heavily distorted leather makes it difficult to read and only reveals the remains of five lines of letters. A. Lange and M. Sieker are very skeptical about a connection to the Prayer of Nabonidus due to the differences in material and script that they emphasize in comparison to the other fragments. They even doubt that it belongs to the same scroll.

Based on palaeographic comparisons, the script was dated by J. Milik to the years between 50 BC and 25 BC and thus to the transition period from Hasmonean to Herodian writing. In contrast, F. M. Cross defines the form as a "Jewish Semicursive" from the second quarter of the 1st century BC.

The orthography shows some archaic forms such as המון (reconstructed in column I, line 8) and אנתה (fragment 4, line 4). There is a Persian loanword (פתגם, "decree, edict") as well as a lexical Hebraism (שׁכן, "ulcer, inflammation"). However, the evaluation of the linguistic features is controversial with regard to a chronological classification. A. Lange and M. Sieker argue for a date of composition in the late 4th or early 3rd century BC, while F. García Martínez assumes the 5th century BC. J. Fitzmyer, on the other hand, classifies the Prayer of Nabonidus as a Middle Aramaic text (200 B.C. - A.D. 200).

== Content ==
The first line of fragment 1 contains the beginning of the work and also its title: "Words of prayer that Nabunai [...] prayed." According to K. Beyer, the form of the name "Nabunai" is a "form of invocation and tenderness". The mention of Tayma in line 2 makes it appear beyond doubt that this refers to Nabonidus as the Babylonian king. He spent ten years in the oasis of Tayma, which he developed into his seat of government. This stay is reported in the Nabonidus Chronicle, which were first published in 1882, and in the so-called Verse Account of Nabonidus. In the year of the first publication of the Prayer of Nabonidus, Nabonidus's own account of the events of those years was found in the Harran Stela.

In his prayer, Nabonidus reports that he was plagued by an ulcer for seven years. Finally, the deity hears his prayer, forgives his sin and heals him. A Judean then comes to Nabonidus and asks him to publicly announce his healing. Nabonidus looks back on the seven years of his illness and describes how he prayed in vain to other deities made of metal and wood.

Fragment 4 is almost impossible to interpret. It is possible that lines 1 and 2 tell of the healing, while line 3 is about a visit from Nabonidus's friends.

== Relationship to other traditions ==
In the biblical book of Daniel, c. 3:24-4:34, there is a story about Nebuchadnezzar II that is similar to the Prayer of Nabonidus. Here, too, a Babylonian king is mentioned who falls ill. The "seven years" in the Prayer correspond to the "seven times" in Daniel (Daniel 4:16; 25). Like the Prayer, the narrative in the Book of Daniel is formulated in the first person singular for long stretches. In both cases, a Judean plays a decisive role. The discovery of the Qumran text confirms the earlier assumption that the text in Daniel also goes back to a tradition that deals with Nabonidus.

In the course of tradition, however, the narrative was transferred to Nebuchadnezzar, who was more prominent in Jewish tradition. Research therefore usually assumes a literary dependence of the stories in the Book of Daniel on the Prayer of Nabonidus, but an inverse relationship is also considered: the Prayer of Nabonidus makes use of numerous formulations from Daniel, is more strictly oriented towards monotheism and attempts to fill the historical gap between Daniel 4 and 5, i.e. between Nebuchadnezzar and the beginning of Persian rule.

A third possibility is considered by A. Lange and M. Sieker: both Daniel and the prayer of Nabonidus draw on the Nabonidus polemic from Persian times and enrich it with Jewish interpretations. It would therefore not be necessary to assume a dependence on the history of tradition.

The Babylonian texts report on Nabonidus's ten-year stay in Tayma. The Babylonian king repeatedly emphasizes his worship of the moon god Sin of Harran and the sun god Shamash. However, the Babylonian chronicles make no mention of Nabonidus turning to the Jewish God or a Jewish soothsayer.

There are also certain similarities with the account of the death of Antiochus IV Epiphanes in 2 Maccabees 9:5–27.

== Text and translation ==
- Klaus Beyer: Die aramäischen Texte vom Toten Meer: Samt den Inschriften aus Palästina, dem Testament Levis aus der Kairoer Genisa, der Fastenrolle und den alten talmudischen Zitaten; aramaistische Einleitung, Text, Übersetzung, Deutung, Grammatik/Wörterbuch, deutsch-aramäische Wortliste und Register. Vandenhoeck & Ruprecht, Göttingen 1984, ISBN 3-525-53571-6, S. 223–224 (in German).
- John J. Collins: 242. 4QPrayer of Nabonidus ar. In: George J. Brooke et al. (ed.): Qumran Cave 4.XVII: Parabiblical Texts 3 (DJD XXII). Oxford 1996, 83–93.
- Józef T. Milik: Prière de Nabonide et autres écrits d'un cycle de Daniel. Fragments araméens de Qumran 4. In: Revue Biblique 63 (1956), 407–415 (in French).
- Émile Puech: La Prière de Nabonide (4Q242). In: Kevin J. Cathcart; Michael Maher (ed.): Targumic and Cognate Studies. Essays in Honour of Martin McNamara. JSOT.S 230. Sheffield 1996, 208–227.
- Annette Steudel et al. (ed.): Die Texte aus Qumran II. Darmstadt 2001, 159–165, 265–266 (in German).

== Bibliography ==
- John J. Collins: New Light on the Book of Daniel from the Dead Sea Scrolls. In: Florentino García Martínez, Edward Noort (ed.): Perspectives in the Study of the Old Testament and Early Judaism. A Symposium in Honour of Adam S. van de Woude on the Occasion of His 70th Birthday (Supplements to Vetus Testamentum 73). Leiden 1998, 180–196.
- Frank Moore Cross: Fragments of the Prayer of Nabonidus. In: Israel Exploration Journal 34 (1984), 260–264.
- Florentino García Martínez: The Prayer of Nabonidus. A New Synthesis. In: Ders.: Qumran and Apocalyptic. Studies on the Aramaic Texts from Qumran. (Studies on the Texts of the Desert of Judah 9.) Leiden 1992, 116–136.
- Armin Lange; Marion Sieker: Gattung und Quellenwert des Gebets des Nabonid. In: Heinz-Josef Fabry; Armin Lange; Hermann Lichtenberger (ed.): Qumranstudien. Vorträge und Beiträge der Teilnehmer des Qumranseminars auf dem internationalen Treffen der Society of Biblical Literature, Münster, 25–26 Juli 1993. Schriften des Institutum Judaicum Delitzschianum 4. Göttingen 1996, 3–34.
- Andrew Steinmann: The Chicken and the Egg. A New Proposal for the Relationship Between the Prayer of Nabonidus and the Book of Daniel. In: Revue de Qumran 20 (2002), 557–570.
- Adam S. van der Woude: Bemerkungen zum Gebet des Nabonid. In: Mathias Delcor (ed.): Qumrân. Sa piété, sa théologie, et son milieu. Leuven 1978, 120–129.
