= Alcimus =

2nd-century BCE High Priest of Israel

Alcimus (from Ancient Greek: Ἄλκιμος Alkimos, "valiant" or Hebrew אליקום Elyaqum, "God will rise"), also called Jakeimos, Jacimus, or Joachim (Ἰάκειμος), was High Priest of Israel for three years from 162–159 BCE. He was a moderate Hellenizer who favored the ruling government of the Seleucid Empire (Greek Syria) and opposed the Maccabean Revolt which was in progress at the time.

== Original sources ==
What is known of Alcimus comes from records found in 1 Maccabees (1 Maccabees 7:4–50, 1 Maccabees 9:1–57); 2 Maccabees (2 Maccabees 14); and Josephus's Antiquities of the Jews Book 12, Chapters 9-11. All of these sources are hostile to Alcimus; no sources from his faction's perspective survived. Alcimus is described as a leader of the Hellenizing faction of Hellenistic Judaism that favored more enthusiastic adoption of Greek practices and less adherence to Jewish law.

== Biography ==
The office of high priest was recently vacant in 163 BCE after despised High Priest Menelaus was executed by Regent Lysias. It is not clear if Menelaus was of the high priestly line, but he most likely was not, which partially explains the troubles his time had. Alcimus was a descendant of the Biblical Aaron, brother of Moses, and possibly himself was in the high-priestly line. Being ambitious for the office of high priest, he traveled to Antioch to secure the appointment from new Seleucid king Demetrius I Soter, who had just overthrown young king Antiochus V Eupator and Lysias. Alcimus was of the Hellenizing party, and therefore bitterly opposed by the Maccabees. Alcimus received his appointment as high priest at some point from 163–162 BCE: 2 Maccabees suggests 163 BCE, under the reign of Antiochus V, while 1 Maccabees suggests only after the trip to Antioch in 162 BCE. It is also possible that Alcimus had been made High Priest on some sort of interim arrangement by Lysias in 163 BCE and was confirmed by Demetrius I in 162 BCE.

Demetrius sent an army under Bacchides to establish Alcimus in the high priesthood at Jerusalem. The favor with which Alcimus was received by the Jews at Jerusalem on account of his Aaronic descent was soon turned to hate by his cruelties. Alcimus ordered the arrest and execution of 60 Jews, apparently members of the Hasideans. When Bacchides and his army returned to Antioch, the rebel forces under Judas Maccabeus (Judah Maccabee) remained active in the countryside, where they attacked Greek-friendly Jews. Alcimus returned to Demetrius I to ask for more troops to fight the rebels. Demetrius sent another army, led by Nicanor. Nicanor at first attempted to make a peace deal with Judas; 2 Maccabees 14.26 reports that Alcimus sabotaged the deal by complaining to Demetrius I. Nicanor then attempted to arrest Judas and eventually went into the countryside to fight the Maccabees; he was defeated and killed, however. A third army, under Bacchides again, was dispatched, and Judas was defeated and killed at the Battle of Elasa. Alcimus's position as high priest was reinforced and strong garrisons were left in Jerusalem and the other cities of Judea to maintain Seleucid rule. Alcimus did not long enjoy his triumph, since he died soon after. The authors of the Books of Maccabees say his last act was to order the wall of the temple that divided the Gentiles from the Jews pulled down. His death is recorded in May 159 BCE, the month Sivan in the Hebrew calendar.

=== Name and similar figures in tradition ===
Josephus writes that Alcimus was "also called Jakeimos." Jews in the Hellenistic era usually adopted dual names, a Greek and a Hebrew one: Alcimus was likely the Greek form of the Hebrew name "Eliakim" and Jakeimos the Greek form of Hebrew "Yakim"

The midrashes Genesis Rabbah and Tehillim briefly discuss a figure named "Jakum of Zeroroth" (or "Jakim", "Yakim"). In the story, a man named Joseph Meshita robs a golden artifact from the temple, then is sawed in half. Rabbi Jose ben Joezer is Jakum's uncle; Jakum mocks Joezer during his hanging, but then experiences remorse and commits suicide. Due to Jakum's similarity to Jakeimos, some scholars believe it is describing Alcimus, albeit after hundreds of years of the story drifting. In this view, Meshita is Menelaus, who allowed the Temple to be robbed by Antiochus IV and stole from it himself, allegedly. Other midrash indicate that Joezer was executed by General Bacchides, suggesting that Alcimus's alliance with Bacchides led to his own family's death, if the identification of the two figures is correct. However, not all scholars are convinced of the connection; Robert Doran argues that the identification of the two Yakims as the same person is "highly speculative and debatable", as Yakim was not a rare name at the time, and the manner of death greatly differs in the two accounts.

An ossuary discovered in a burial cave by Eleazar Sukenik in the Gophna region has an inscription in Greek that reads "Salōmē, wife (daughter?) of Jakeimos". It is speculated that this ossuary might hold the bones of Alcimus's wife or possibly daughter; it is from the roughly correct era of time and Gophna had many priests, although others wealthy enough to inter their family's bones might have had the same name.

=== Political situation ===
By the time of Alcimus's reign as High Priest, the Maccabees had radicalized into seeking a starker break from Seleucid political control. The author of 1 Maccabees describes any who worked with Alcimus as godless traitors, but it seems that there was a branch of moderates caught in the middle - moderate Hellenists who were happy to work with Alcimus as long as religious protections were guaranteed and Antiochus IV's decrees stayed repealed. This would explain why the Hasideans were willing to work with Alcimus at first, why the books of Maccabees discuss Nicanor's attempted negotiations with Judas, and the author's frustration at how "all the troublers of their people rallied to him (Alcimus), overran the land of Judah, and inflicted a great defeat on Israel." While the surviving sources are hostile to Alcimus, it does appear that they grudgingly concede he was able to rally more allies to his cause than Menelaus had. Alcimus's coalition building, however he managed it, would go on to cause problems for the Maccabees, who would suffer military disaster in 160 BCE and be forced to retreat to the countryside seemingly in defeat.

=== Psalm 79 quote ===
The book of 1 Maccabees quotes Psalm 79 after describing the death of the Hasideans: "The flesh of your faithful ones and their blood / they poured out all around Jerusalem, / and there was no one to bury them." (1 Maccabees 7:16–17, Psalms 79:2–3) The statement introducing it says that he (Alcimus) seized the sixty and killed them, and continues on to say in most translations that it is in accordance with the word that was written in the Psalm. However, Benjamin Scolnic (citing Jonathan A. Goldstein) argues a more direct translation would be as a continuation of "he" (Alcimus) both seizing the Hasideans and writing the verse. If that was the intent of the author of 1 Maccabees, it would suggest that Alcimus himself wrote the Psalm himself as a lament, which would rather change the tenor of the verse and offer a more sympathetic portrayal to Alcimus. More favorable sources to Alcimus suggest that the execution of the sixty was unlikely to be for no reason, and the Hasmoneans wished to sway the moderate Hasideans by portraying the executed as innocent moderates rather than Maccabee supporters.

=== Pulling down the wall ===
Temple architecture was deeply important in the era for its symbolism. The sources do not directly describe Alcimus's motive for pulling down the wall in the Temple, although the book of 1 Maccabees goes so far as to suggest that God struck down and killed Alcimus for the impious act. Taken literally, the passage suggests a return to the uncleansed Temple under Menelaus, where Greeks and Jews alike worshipped together. However, a full-scale revival of the syncretic cult Menelaus established does not appear to have taken place; whether that was due to Alcimus's death, or that the wall incident had nothing to do with such a plan, is not clear. Another possibility is that it may have been related to theological dispute of the era, and the barrier was intended to be between priests and common worshippers. Josephus, elsewhere in Antiquities of the Jews, describes "a wooden lattice around the altar and the sanctuary extending up the barrier" during the time of Hasmonean King Alexander Jannaeus; Alcimus's act may have been related to a dispute around a different such barrier that was interpreted in a hostile fashion by the Maccabees. A similar theological dispute, possibly a continuation, existed in the later Roman era - the Christian gospels describe the curtain of the Temple separating God from common people tearing in two on the day of Jesus's execution, and the Apostle Paul as getting in trouble at the Temple for bringing a Greek inside, suggesting that the matter of who is allowed into what parts of the Temple would continue to be contested. Alternatively, the meaning could be entirely reversed: that by removing the barrier, non-Zadokite priests, once able to approach the Inner Temple but not past the barrier, could no longer enter at all, making the Inner Temple more exclusive rather than more inclusive.

A passage in the Middot tractate of the Talmud might refer to Alcimus as well. Chapter 2, Verse 3 says: "Within it [the Temple Mount] was the Soreg [latticed railing], ten handbreadths high. There were thirteen breaches in it, which had been originally made by the kings of Greece, and when they repaired them they enacted that thirteen prostrations should be made facing them." Some interpreters believe that "kings of Greece" refers to the Greek-appointed High Priest Alcimus: that he made 13 ceremonial breaches in the lattice rather than destroying it entirely, which were then ceremonially repaired later.

== Successor ==
The holder of the High Priest position from 159–152 BCE is not known. It is possible the position was vacant, or held by some interim priest whose name is lost to history. Eventually, Jonathan Apphus took the position in 152 BCE after securing an alliance with Seleucid royal claimant Alexander Balas. One theory of Alcimus's successor is that it was the Righteous Teacher, a mysterious figure described in the Qumran Habakkuk Commentary, one of the Dead Sea Scrolls discovered in 1947. In this theory, the Righteous Teacher, a Zadokite, serves as High Priest for a time before being betrayed by a Wicked Priest (Jonathan) and a "Man of the Lie" and dismissed from his post. The Teacher retreats to Qumran, where he becomes the founder of the Essenes, a sect of Judaism. The truth of the Righteous Teacher's identity is unclear as firm dates are not provided, but this scenario is consistent with the known antagonism of the Qumran community to the Hasmonean dynasty.

Jewish titles
Preceded by Menelaus	High Priest of Israel; 162 BCE—159 BCE	Unknown Next known title holder: Jonathan Apphus
