= Pesher =

Interpretive commentary on scripture

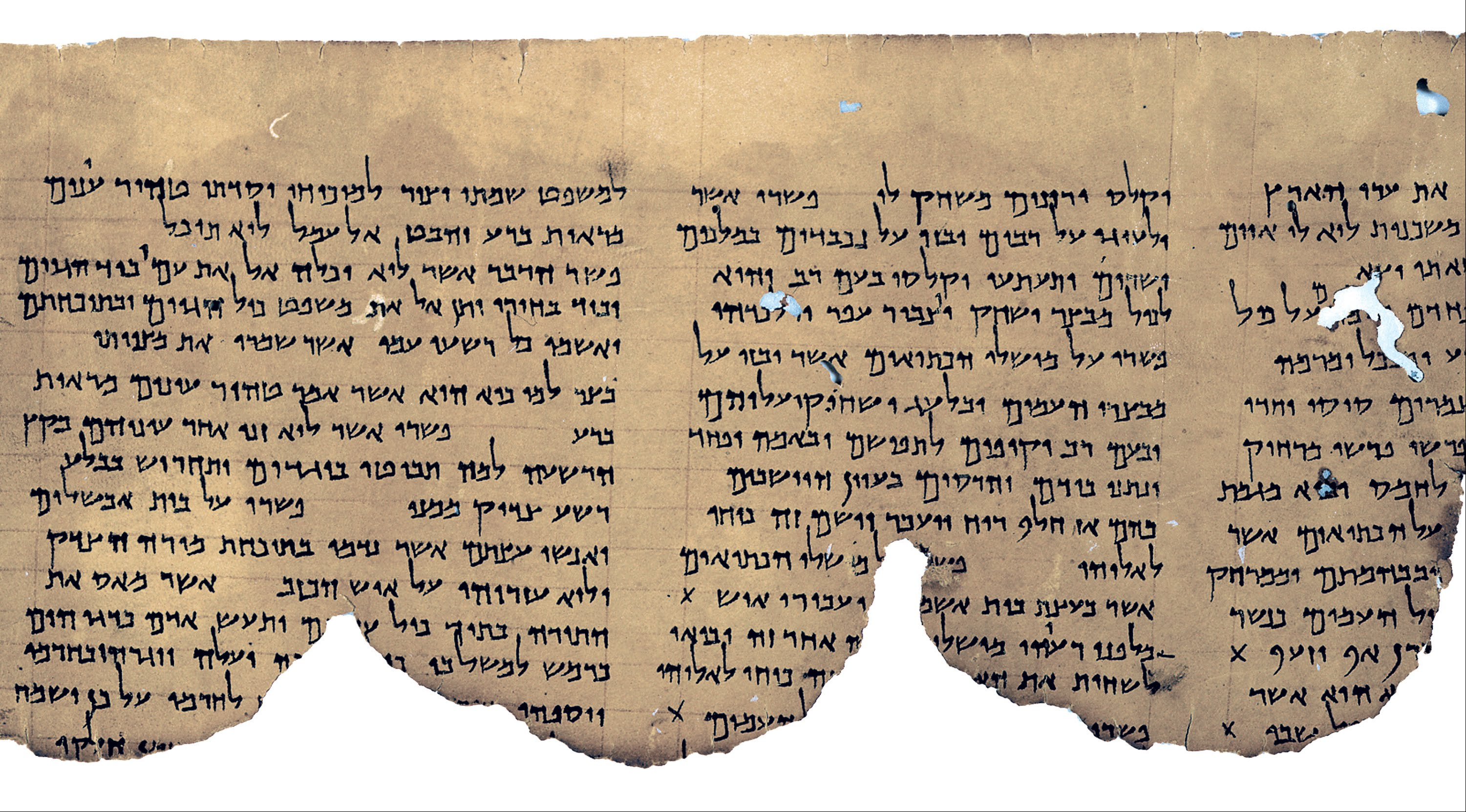
Pesher Habakkuk

Pesher (/ˈpɛʃər/; Hebrew: פשר, pl. pesharim), from the Hebrew root meaning "interpretation," is a group of interpretive commentaries on scripture. These commentaries became known from the discovery of the Dead Sea Scrolls. The texts give a theory of scriptural interpretation of a number of biblical texts from the Hebrew Bible, such as Habakkuk and Psalms.

The authors of the pesharim claimed that scripture is written in two levels; the surface level for ordinary readers with limited knowledge, and the concealed level for specialists with higher knowledge. For example, the Habakkuk Pesher (1QpHab) teaches that God has made known to the Teacher of Righteousness, a prominent figure in the history of the Essene community, "all the mysteries of his servants the prophets" (1QpHab VII:4–5).

== Types ==
There are two types of pesharim found in the dead sea scrolls: continuous and thematic.

=== Continuous ===
Continuous pesharim go through specific biblical books and quote the book phrase by phrase; after each quotation, an interpretation of the verse is added. There are 15 continuous pesharim that have been found and dated, including: five on Isaiah (4Q161, 4Q162, 4Q163, 4Q164, 4Q165); three on the Psalms (1Q16, 4Q171, 4Q173); and seven on books of the Minor Prophets (1QpHab on Habakkuk; 1Q14 on Micah; 1Q15 and 4Q170 on Zephaniah; 4Q166 and 4Q167 on Hosea; 4Q169 on Nahum). Below is an example of continuous pesharim from 1QpHab:

"Behold the nations and see, marvel and be astonished; for I accomplish a deed in your days, but you will not believe it when told" [Hab 1.5].

[Interpreted, this concerns] those who were unfaithful together with the Liar, in that they [did] not [listen to the word received by] the teacher of Righteousness from the mouth of God. And it concerns the unfaithful of the New [Covenant] in that they have not believed in the Covenant of God [and have profaned] his holy name."

=== Thematic ===
Thematic pesharim are similar to continuous pesharim in that they comment on and cite from biblical verses, but thematic pesharim focus on a particular theme (eg. "the end of days") and pull from multiple biblical books as opposed to commenting on books verse by verse. In these texts, scriptural books were connected and therefore a passage or verse in one book could be interpreted or clarified by passages or verses found either later in the same book, or even another text. An example of thematic pesharim is text 4Q174, which is known as Florilegium. This scroll discuses several biblical texts including: 2 Sam 7, Ps 1 & 2, Exod 15, Ezek 37, Isa 8 & 65, and Amos. It looks at these texts with messianic implications and characterizes the Davidic Messiah as God's son.

== Historic individuals ==
The Pesharim (plural) contain references to a number of individuals and groups throughout their interpretation of the texts. As the Pesharim refer to specific events and make mention of these specific individuals, the Pesharim are important in understanding Qumran's history and culture during the times that their authors lived. Below are the most prominent individuals and groups cited.

Teacher of Righteousness: The Teacher of Righteousness is spoken of, referred to, and cited in many of the Pesharim, including the Damascus Document, the Habakkuk Commentary, the Commentary on the Psalms, and many others. The Teacher of Righteousness is the main spiritual leader of the Essenes at Qumran, and his exact identity is unknown. The Teacher of Righteousness is believed by many scholars to have been the author of some of the texts found at Qumran, such as the Teacher Hymns. Throughout the Pesharim, the 'interpreter' who writes the Pesher can be seen identifying biblical individuals as if they are actually The Teacher of Righteousness, such as the passage found in the Psalms 37 portion of the Commentaries on Psalms which states;

"I have been young, and now I am old, but I have not seen a righteous man abandoned and his children begging food
All the time he is lending generously, and [his] chil[dren] are blessed (37:25–26)
[This] refers to the Teacher of [Righteousness . . ]" (4Q171 Col.3)

Wicked Priest: The Wicked Priest is the Teacher of Righteousness's main opponent, who also sought to kill the Teacher of Righteousness. The identity of the Wicked Priest is more clear than that of the Teacher of Righteousness, with scholars suggesting that he was a Hasmonean high priest such as Jonathan Apphus or Alexander Jannaeus. The Wicked Priest is referenced the most in the Commentary on Habukkuk, which states that the Wicked Priest was originally reliable, but once he became ruler he forsook God for riches and rebelled against God and committed abhorrent deeds. In the Commentary on the Psalms, the Wicked Priest sought to kill the Teacher of Righteousness for sending a law to him; some scholars have suggested that this law was 4QMMT. If the Wicked Priest was in fact Jonathan, then he met his own end in 142 BCE at the hands of Diodotus Tryphon, which would match well with the Habakkuk Commentary that comments on the terrible end met by the Wicked Priest.

Man of Mockery: The Teacher of Righteousness also had opponents with regard to interpretation of scripture and the law who grew out of the Qumran community's own ranks. The Man of Mockery is one such individual who rejected the Teacher of Righteousness's claims, withdrew himself from the group, and took some followers with him. These were then referred to as the Men of Mockery.

The Man of Lie: The Teacher of Righteousness's opponent was also called the Man of Lie. According to the Pesher on Psalms, this individual is prophesied in scripture and was indeed successful in leading people astray.

Kittim: A group called the Kittim is mentioned in several Pesharim, including Apocalypse of Weeks, Pesher on Isaiah, Pesher Habakkuk, and Pesher Nahum. The Kittim are usually identified as the Romans. The Kittim are portrayed as Gentiles who will play a role in the great wars of the end times.

== Themes ==
Within the pesharim found at Qumran, different themes occur within separate texts.

Salvation

The Pesher on Psalms has the theme of salvation, focusing on those who are wrongdoers in the eyes of God and how those who do good will see the rewards of life. For instance, 4Q171 Fragment 1 insists that as a devoted believer you shall respect the Law, and those who don't will not be saved. "Renounce your anger and abandon your resentment, don't yearn to do evil, because evildoers will be wiped out" (37:8–9a). Such interpretations of the psalms assign them a deeper meaning and connect them to all human beings, splitting those who are good from those who are not.

Apocalyptic

Apocalyptic themes also exist within the Pesharim. Several interpretations with apocalyptic themes are found in these commentaries from Qumran. These include Pesher Isaiah and Pesher Habakkuk, which talk about the fate of Israel's enemies and several other apocalyptic events. Topics of particular interest for modern scholars interpreting the Dead Sea Scrolls include the origin of belief in an apocalyptic war near the end of time, and identification of the enemy in such a war.

Several scholars have investigated similarities between beliefs found in early Christian communities and those expressed by the Qumran community. For example, Stephen Goranson compares the Dead Sea Scrolls with the Apocalypse of John. The War Scroll and the Apocalypse of John, which both use apocalyptic language, differ sharply in their views of the apocalyptic war.

== Pesharim found at Qumran ==
- Continuous Pesharim
  - 1QpHab: (Habakkuk Pesher)
  - 1Q14 (Pesher Micah)
  - 4Q161–165: 4QpIsa a–e (Isaiah Pesher)
  - 4Q166–167: 4QpHos a–b (Hosea Pesher)
  - 4Q169: 4QpNah (Nahum Pesher)
  - 4Q170: 4QpZeph (Zephaniah Pesher)
  - 4Q171 & 173: 4QpPs a–b (Psalms Pesher)
  - 4Q172 (Unidentified Pesher)
  - 4Q247–4Q (Pesher on the Apocalypse of the Weeks)
- Thematic Pesharim
  - 4Q252 (Genesis Pesher)
  - 4Q174: 4Qflor (Eschatological Commentary A/Florilegium)
  - 4Q177 (Eschatological Commentary B)
  - 11Q13: 11QMelch (the Melchizedek Midrash)
