= Florentino García Martínez =

Florentino García Martínez (born 1942, in Mochales or Madrid) is a former Catholic priest, now married and for many years professor of religion and theology at the University of Groningen in the Netherlands. He is a leading expert on messianic ideas in the Dead Sea Scrolls.

He is responsible for the standard translation of the Dead Sea Scrolls along with Eibert Tigchelaar: The Dead Sea Scrolls: Study Edition, 2 Volumes, (Leiden/Grand Rapids: Brill/Eerdmans, 1997 & 1998).

García Martínez has put forward an analysis of the material regarding the Wicked Priest found columns 8 to 12 of the Habakkuk Commentary known as the Groningen hypothesis.

García Martínez became a foreign member of the Royal Netherlands Academy of Arts and Sciences in 2004.

== Publications ==
Among García Martínez's more recent publications are:

- Echoes from the Caves: Qumran and the New Testament. (García Martínez, F., Ed.). (Leiden/Boston: Brill, 2009).
- Defining Identities. We, You, and the Other in the Dead Sea Scrolls. (Garcia Martinez, F., Ed.). (Leiden: Brill, 2008).
- Wisdom and apocalypticism in the Dead Sea Scrolls and in the biblical tradition. (Garcia Martinez, F., Ed.). (Leuven: Peeters, 2003).

== Sources ==
- Knighthood announcement
