= Baskama =

Location where the Book of Maccabees says Jonathan of the Hasmoneans was killed

Baskama is the place where Jonathan Apphus, the Hasmonean leader of the Judean forces in the Maccabean era from c. 160–143 BCE, was killed by Diodotus Tryphon according to the book 1 Maccabees (1 Maccabees 13:23).

The New American Bible Revised Edition suggests that Baskama may lie northeast of the Sea of Galilee. Jewish historian Uriel Rappaport writes that it was "probably in the Golan (...) but identification is uncertain". A note in the Encyclopedia of the Bible states that "it is referred to as Basca by Josephus in his Antiquities, xiii. 6. 6. It is possibly to be identified with modern el-Jummeizeh, NE of the Sea of Galilee". This identification is also accepted by the Israeli historian Michael Avi-Yonah.
