= History in the Dead Sea Scrolls =

History in the Dead Sea Scrolls refers to the exploration of the historical significance of the discovery of the Dead Sea Scrolls. These ancient manuscripts can offer valuable historical insights into the history of Israel and the period of Second Temple Judaism, as well as the emergence of Christianity and rabbinic Judaism.

The Qumran sectarian writings were clearly not intended to be historical texts, as such, in their modern meaning. These texts primarily focus on religious and legal issues, reflecting the beliefs and practices of the Qumran community, rather than providing a comprehensive historical account of the period.

And yet, the scrolls contain references to figures like Antiochus IV and other Seleucid rulers, providing some insights into the political context of the Hasmonean period. So they provide a unique perspective on the development of Jewish religious thought and practice during this period.

The scrolls can contribute to our understanding of the Hasmonean period, and help to clarify the political history, religious beliefs, and social structures of the time.

Thus, some elements of real history can be found in the Qumran writings. For example, there are numerous direct references to the historical people and places.

“Michael Wise (2003, 65-81) lists in chronological order the 31 items from all the compositions that mention a recognizable place, person or process, from the high priesthood of Onias III in 174 B.C.E. (4Q245 1.9) to the plunder of Jerusalem in 37 B.C.E. (lQpHab IX.4-7). Some of Wise’s historical identifications may be challenged, but he is clearly referring to a wide range of compositions of various genres.”

== References to the Kittim ==
In the Scrolls, there are numerous references to the Kittim, which are generally believed to be a reference to the Roman Empire, although there is some debate about this among the scholars, because the Scrolls also refer to "the Kittim of Assyria".

For example, such references are found in The War of the Sons of Light Against the Sons of Darkness, also known as the War Scroll, which is a manual for military organization and strategy that was discovered among the Dead Sea Scrolls.

A group called the Kittim is also mentioned in several Qumran Pesharim, including the Apocalypse of Weeks, Pesher on Isaiah, Pesher Habakkuk, and Pesher Nahum.

Accordingly, the scholars were divided on their time of composition. Two time periods have been put forward as the most probable time of composition: the Seleucid period and the Roman period.

While scholar Eleazar Sukenik argued that the reference to 'The Kittim of Asshur' (Assyria) in the text of the War Scroll should be understood to refer to the Seleucid Empire which controlled the territory of the former Assyrian Empire at that time, his son Yigael Yadin interpreted this phrase as a reference to the Romans. Accordingly, Yadin argued that this passage was authored after the Roman conquest of Israel, but before the end of Herod’s reign.

But Nadav Sharon (2017) makes a distinction between two groups of Dead Sea Scrolls texts in this regard. According to him, it is quite certain that the Kittim in Pesher Nahum and Pesher Habakkuk are Romans. But this is a later group of texts, according to him.

He describes the earlier group of texts as the “war literature”. These are primarily the War Scroll (1QM), but also some other texts such as Sefer Hamilhamah (4Q285) and Pesher Isaiah(a) (4Q161). These texts have usually been cited in regard to the Kittim being the Seleucids or the Ptolemies. And among this group, the Kittim are actually the Greeks, because these “war literature” texts were composed prior to the Roman conquest.

== Other texts with historical references ==
Some of the Qumran texts are described as mishmarot, and they also sometimes contain important historical references. In general, the mishmarot refers to the weekly courses and temple watches; a rotating system for the twenty-four priestly families, as outlined in texts like 4Q325 ("Mishmarot D") and 4Q326. This word literally translates as "watches" or "guards". These texts can also be described as the calendrical documents, because they detailed the weekly courses and noted important dates like Sabbaths and festivals.

== See also ==
- Reclaiming the Dead Sea Scrolls
- Who Wrote the Dead Sea Scrolls?

== Bibliography ==
- Kenneth Atkinson 2014, Judah Aristobulus and Alexander Jannaeus in the Dead Sea Scrolls.
- A BOLOTNIKOV 2005, THE THEME OF APOCALYPTIC WAR IN THE DEAD SEA SCROLLS.
- Brooke, George J., What Makes a Text Historical? Assumptions behind the Classification of Some Dead Sea Scrolls. In Davies, P.R. (Editor) ; Edelman, D.V. (Editor), The Historian and the Bible: Essays in Honour of Lester L. Grabbe. London : T&T Clark Ltd, 2010. pp. 45–61
- Edward Dabrowa 2011, The Hasmoneans in the Light of the Qumran Scrolls.
- Hanan Eshel 2008, The Dead Sea Scrolls and the Hasmonean State. Grand Rapids: Eerdmans.
- Nadav Sharon 2017, Judea under Roman Domination: The First Generation of Statelessness and Its Legacy. SBL Press. ISBN 9780884142218
- Travis B. Williams 2019, History and Memory in the Dead Sea Scrolls. ISBN 9781108493338
- Michael O. Wise, “Dating the Teacher of Righteousness and the Floruit of His Movement,” JBL 122 [2003] 53–87 [79]).
