= Carbon dating the Dead Sea Scrolls =

Series of radiocarbon dating tests performed on the Dead Sea Scrolls

Carbon dating the Dead Sea Scrolls refers to a series of radiocarbon dating tests performed on the Dead Sea Scrolls, first by the AMS (Accelerator Mass Spectrometry) lab of the Zurich Institute of Technology in 1991 and then by the AMS Facility at the University of Arizona in Tucson in 1994–95. There was also a historical test of a piece of linen performed in 1946 by Willard Libby, the inventor of the dating method.

== Testing ==
One of the earliest carbon dating tests was carried out on November 14, 1950. This was on a piece of linen from Qumran Cave 1, the resulting date range being 167 BCE – 233 CE. Libby had first started using the dating method in 1946 and the early testing required relatively large samples, so testing on scrolls themselves only became feasible when methods used in the dating process were improved upon. F.E. Zeuner carried out tests on date palm wood from the Qumran site yielding a date range of 70 BCE – 90 CE. In 1963 Libby tested a sample from the Isaiah Scroll, which provided a range of 200 BCE – 1 CE.

In 1991, Robert Eisenman and Philip R. Davies made a demand to date a number of scrolls, which led to a series of tests carried out in Zurich on samples from fourteen scrolls. Among these were samples from other sites around the Dead Sea, which contained date indications within the text to supply a control for the carbon dating results. A similar battery of tests was carried out in 1994–95 in Tucson, this time with samples from twenty-two scrolls as well as another piece of linen.

In 2025, a series of radiocarbon tests were carried out on samples from thirty scrolls. The samples were distributed as 25 from the Qumran Caves, 1 from Masada, 2 from the Murabbaat caves, and 2 from the Nahal Hever caves. The study also made use of an AI-based date-prediction model called "Enoch", which was trained by applying Bayesian ridge regression on the handwriting-style descriptors of 24 of the 14C-dated samples, for the paleographic dating of some 135 previously undated manuscripts.

== 14C Test results ==
The following table shows all the Qumran-related samples that were tested by Zurich (Z), Tucson (T) and Libby (L). The column headed "14C Age" provides a raw age before 1950 for each sample tested. This represents the ideal date for the amount of 14C measured for the sample. However, as the quantity of 14 absorbed by all life fluctuates from year to year, the figure must be calibrated based on known fluctuation. This calibrated range of dates is represented in the last column, given with a 2-sigma error rating, which means at 95% confidence. With the exception of the first text from Wadi-ed-Daliyeh, the texts in the table below are only those from the caves around Qumran. The table orders them chronologically, based on 14C age.

-	Lab	Description	14C Age	Calibrated Age (2-sigma)
1	Z	(Wadi Daliyeh deed)	2289 +/- 55	408–203 BCE
2	Z	Testament of Qahat	2240 +/- 39	395–181 BCE
3	T	1QIsaiah^{a}	2141 +/- 32	351–295 or 230–53 BCE
4	Z	Frg. 3 (from 4Q365?)	2139 +/- 32	351–296 or 230–53 BCE
5	Z	1QIsaiah^{a}	2128 +/- 38	351–296 or 230–48 BCE
6	Z	4Q213 Levi^{a} ar	2125 +/- 24	344–324 or 203–53 BCE
7	T	4Q249 pap cryptA	2097 +/- 50	349–304 or 228 BCE–18 CE
8	Z	4Q53Samuel^{c}	2095 +/- 49	349–318 or 228 BCE–18 CE
9	L	1QIsaiah^{a}	2050 +/- 100	200 BCE – 1 CE
10	T	4Q208 (4QEnastr^{A})	2095 +/- 20	172–48 BCE
11	T	4Q267	2094 +/- 29	198–3 BCE
12	T	4Q317 Phases of the Moon	2084 +/- 30	196–1 BCE
13	T	1QpHab Habakkuk Commentary	2054 +/- 22	160–148 or 111 BCE–2 CE
14	T	4Q22 paleoExodus^{m}	2044 +/- 65	342–324 or 203 BCE–83 CE or 105–115 CE
15	T	1QS Community Rule	2041 +/- 68	344–323 or 203 BCE–122 CE
16	Z	11Q19 Temple Scroll	2030 +/- 32	166 BCE–67 CE
17	T	4Q22 paleoExodus^{m} patch	2024 +/- 39	161–146 or 113 BCE–70 CE
18	Z	1QApGen Genesis Apocryphon	2013 +/- 32	89 BCE–118 CE
19	T	4Q521 Messianic Apocalypse	1984 +/- 33	49 BCE–116 CE
20	Z	1QH Thanksgiving Scroll	1979 +/- 32	47 BCE–118 CE
21	T	4Q258 Comm. Rule, 2nd sample	1964 +/- 45	50 BCE–130 CE
22	T	4Q266 Damascus Document^{a}	1954 +/- 38	44 BCE–129 CE
23	T	4Q171 Psalms Commentary^{a}	1944 +/- 23	3–126 CE
24	T	4Q258 Comm. Rule, 1st sample	1823 +/- 24	129–255 or 303–318 CE

Non-scroll material tested:

25	T	Qumran 4Q Linen with leather thong	2069 +/- 40	197 BCE–46 CE
26	L	Qumran 1Q linen	1917 +/- 200	167 BCE–233 CE

Many of the date ranges provided are actually two date ranges, for example the Habakkuk Commentary (#13), which is given as 160–148 or 111–2 CE. The section of the calibration curve for the 14C age of the Habakkuk Commentary is complex, so that the 14C age of 2054 cuts through a few spikes on the curve, providing two date ranges.

== Observations ==
The Great Isaiah Scroll 1QIsa^{a} has been tested three times, once by Libby, once at Zurich and once at Tucson. The results from the latter two were almost identical, which is a good indicator of the basic accuracy of this dating method. 1QS (#15), tested at Zurich, and 4QSam^{c} (#8), tested at Tucson, provide overlapping date ranges, which is expected when both texts are attributed to the same scribe. When 4Q258 (#24) was tested at Tucson its result was so anomalous (129–255 or 303–318 CE) that the laboratory was asked to retest another sample from the same document. The second test (#21) yielded a result (50 BCE–130 CE) that was deemed more satisfactory.

== See also ==
- Shrine of the Book
