= Wicked Priest =

Opponent of the "Teacher of Righteousness"

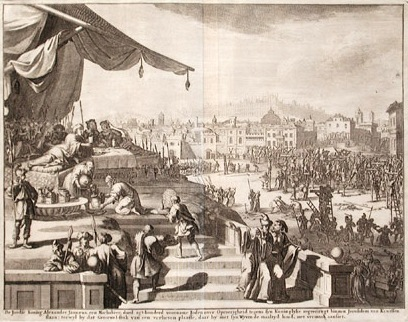
The acts of Hasmonean High Priests attested to in classical sources—such as Alexander Jannaeus's executions of the Pharisees—are often linked to mentions of the Wicked Priest in the Dead Sea Scrolls.

The Wicked Priest (Hebrew: הכהן הרשע; Romanized Hebrew: ha-kōhēn hā-rāš'ā) is a sobriquet used in the Dead Sea Scrolls pesharim, four times in the Habakkuk Commentary (1QpHab) (Note: α: 1QpHab 1.13 is sometimes reconstructed as (fifth) use of the sobriquet. The reconstruction is made by analogy to 4QpPsa frags. 1–10, col. 4.7–10, but has been challenged, thus pushing the first reference to the Wicked Priest to col. 8, with the interpretation of the first of a series of woes. 1QpHab 5.8–12 interprets "wicked one" as the Liar, rather than the Wicked Priest.) and once in the Commentary on Psalm 37 (4QpPs^{a}), to refer to an opponent of the "Teacher of Righteousness." It has been suggested that the phrase is a pun on "ha-kōhēn hā-rōš", as meaning "the High Priest". (Note: β: Some scholars question whether the Wicked Priest was a High Priest or even a priest at all, and still others whether a historical identification is possible or appropriate.) He is generally identified with a Hasmonean (Maccabean) High Priest or Priests. However, his identification remains controversial, and the matter has been called "one of the knottiest problems connected with the Dead Sea Scrolls."

The most commonly argued-for single candidate is Jonathan Apphus, followed by his brother Simon Thassi; the widespread acceptance of this view has been dubbed the "Jonathan consensus." Alternative suggestions include that the sobriquet does not refer to only one individual, but rather a series of multiple Wicked Priests (the "Groningen Hypothesis", advanced by García Martinez and van der Woude), and other suggested figures.

== Background ==
The Habakkuk Commentary (1QpHab) was one of the original seven Dead Sea Scrolls discovered in 1947 and published in 1951. The thirteen-column scroll is a pesher, or "interpretation", of the Book of Habakkuk. The Commentary on Psalm 37 is one of the three pesharim on the Book of Psalms and the only other Dead Sea scroll to use the sobriquet. Psalm 37 has been said to have "the strongest literary and thematic links" with the Book of Habakkuk, compared to the other Psalms, and the language of Psalm 37 is borrowed by the Habakkuk pesherist in the commentary on Hab. 2:17. The similar language and themes of the Commentaries on Habakkuk and Psalm 37 have been suggested as evidence of common authorship, or at least similar interpretive methods.

Radiocarbon dating tests conducted on 1QpHab and 4QpPs^{a} at the Arizona Accelerator Mass Spectrometry Facility gave a one standard deviation confidence interval of 104–43 BCE and a two sigma confidence interval of 120–5 BCE (97%); for 4QpPs^{a} (4Q171) the one standard deviation confidence interval was 22–78 CE and the two sigma confidence interval was 5–111 CE. Earlier paleographic dating of 1QpHab indicated a date range of 30–1 BCE.

The prediction of column 7 of 1QpHab that "the final age shall be prolonged" is sometimes interpreted to mean that the Habakkuk Commentary was written approximately 40 years after the death of the Teacher of Righteousness—the time when the final age should have ended, according to the Damascus Document.

== Text ==
Moreover, the arrogant man seizes wealth without halting. He widens his gullet like Hell and like Death he has never enough. All the nations are gathered to him and all the people are assembled to him. Will they not all of them taunt him and jeer at him saying, 'Woe to him who amasses that which is not his! How long will he load himself up with pledges?
Interpreted, this concerns the Wicked Priest who was called by the name of truth when he first arose. But when he ruled over Israel his heart became proud, and he forsook God and betrayed the precepts for the sake of riches. He robbed and amassed the riches of men of violence who rebelled against God, and he took the wealth of the peoples, heaping sinful iniquity upon himself. And he lived in the ways of abominations amidst every unclean defilement.

— 1QpHab, col. 8, lines 4–11, translated by Vermes (2004)

Because of the blood of men and the violence done to the land, to the city, and all its inhabitants.
Interpreted, this concerns the Wicked Priest whom God delivered into the hands of his enemies because of the iniquity committed against the Teacher of Righteousness and the men of his Council, that he might be humbled by means of a destroying scourge, in bitterness of soul, because he had done wickedly to His elect.

— 1QpHab, col. 9, lines 8–12, translated by Vermes (2004)

Woe to him who causes his neighbours to drink; who pours out his venom to make them drunk that he may gaze upon their feasts.
Interpreted, this concerns the Wicked Priest who pursued the Teacher of Righteousness to the house of his exile that he might confuse him with his venomous fury. And at the time appointed for rest, for the Day of Atonement, he appeared before them to confuse them, and to cause them to stumble on the Day of Fasting, their Sabbath of repose.

— 1QpHab, col. 11, lines 3–8, translated by Vermes (2004)

You have filled yourself with ignomity more than with glory. Drink also, and stagger! The cup of the Lord's right hand shall come round to you and shame shall come on your glory.
Interpreted, this concerns the Priest whose ignomity was greater than his glory. For he did not circumcise the foreskin of his heart, and he walked in the ways of drunkenness that he might quench his thirst. But the cup of wrath of God shall confuse him, multiplying his [...] and the pain of [...]

— 1QpHab, col. 11, lines 8–16, translated by Vermes (2004)

== Description ==
The references to the Wicked Priest have been divided into three overlapping themes: violence against the Teacher of Righteousness and his followers, cultic transgressions and non-observance, and divine punishment against the Wicked Priest for these acts.

=== Role in the history of the Qumran community ===
Many scholars have gleaned from this passage that the Wicked Priest and the Teacher of Righteousness followed different liturgical calendars, thus enabling the Wicked Priest to travel on Yom Kippur; some have even suggested that the Teacher of Righteousness was a schismatic High Priest during the pre-Jonathan intersacerdotium.

=== "Illegitimate Priest" ===
Several scholars have interpreted the sobriquet of "Wicked Priest" as meaning "Illegitimate Priest," i.e. not of Zadokite lineage. Some interpret 1QpHab 8.9–10—that the Wicked Priest was "called by the name of truth when he first arose"—as the initial acceptance of the Wicked Priest by the Qumran community, before Jonathan combined the diarchy of the Kingship and the Priesthood. The "Groningen Hypothesis" also follows this interpretation, based not on evidence from the pesharim but rather from external sources, namely 1 and 2 Maccabees and Josephus

Other scholars, however, argue that hereditary illegitimacy is not listed among the indiscretions of the Wicked Priest, and that this interpretation has been foisted upon the text by decades of questionable interpretation. Collins argues further that there is no evidence in the Community Rule or the Damascus Document to support the view that the Qumran community was concerned with the legitimacy of a non-Zadokite High Priest.

== Other possible references ==
Suggested equivalents of the Wicked Priest are scattered throughout the pesharim. 4QTestimonia (4Q175) mentions "an accursed man, one of Belial" who—with his sons as accomplices—spilt blood "on the breastwork of Lady Zion." Some scholars consider 4QTestimonia a reference to the Wicked Priest, arguing that it fits Simon, who was murdered with his two sons: Judas and Mattathias.

The Nahum Commentary (4Q169) contains numerous explicit references to historical figures, including Alexander Jannaeus, the "furious young lion" who takes revenge on the "seekers of smooth things" for inviting "Demetrius" to conquer Jerusalem. Vermes regards the Nahum Commentary as describing "an age following that of the Teacher of Righteousness and the Wicked Priest," but interprets the "furious young lion" of 4QpHos 2:2–3 as "the last Priest." The liturgical calendar of 4Q322, 324a–b also drops some names associated with various proposed Wicked Priests. The "scoffers" in Jerusalem from 4QpIsab have also been suggested as followers of the Wicked Priest.

=== The Liar ===
Some scholars do not differentiate between the Wicked Priest and the Liar ("Man of the Lie", Iysh Hakkazav), another sobriquet used in 1QpHab. For example, the description of the liar building "his city of vanity with blood" (1QpHab 10.10) has been marshaled another clue to the identity of the Wicked Priest.

The best evidence for distinguishing between the two figures is that the Liar is always associated with "false doctrine and the act of misleading" whereas the Wicked Priest is associated with "cultic transgressions and non-observance." Indeed, such a separation has been suggested even without recourse to sources outside the Commentary on Habakkuk.

== Proposed identifications ==
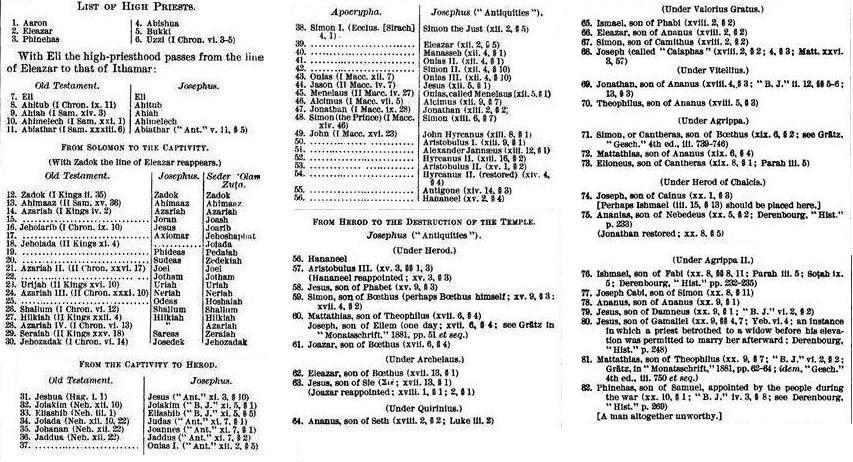
The Wicked Priest has been identified with many High Priests of Israel.

Since the time of de Vaux, the default assumption has been that the Wicked Priest is a single individual, if only because of the appealing parallelism to the Teacher of Righteousness. The consensus time period for the founding of Qumran (150–140 BCE) includes five High Priests: three Hellenized and two Maccabean: Jason, Menelaus, Alcimus, Jonathan, and Simon, and also the various figures potentially associated with the intersacerdotium.

Various early theories situated the Wicked Priest within time periods running the full gamut from the pre-Hasmonaean period, to that of early Christianity, to that of the Crusades. However, that the Wicked Priest "ruled over Israel" (1QpHab 8.10) and was able to partake in "plundering" (9.7) has persuaded most scholars to exclude from consideration the predecessors of the Hasmonean High Priests, who did not share their ability to attack other nations militarily, having been militarily subjugated to Egypt or Syria, and their successors, who were dominated by the Romans. To a lesser extent, that the Wicked Priest was once called "by the name of the truth" (8.8–9) is used to disqualify the pre-Maccabean, Hellenized High Priests, who were not held in high regard by their coreligionists.

Similarly, post-Hasmonean High Priests have not received much serious attention because the "Kittim" (identifiable as the Romans due to the distinct practice of "sacrifice to their standards" attested to in 1QpHab 6.6) are referred to in the imperfect and none of the characters associated with the beginning of the Qumran community would have come into contact with the Romans

The "Maccabean theory"—as advanced by Cross, Milik, and Vermes—traditionally identifies the Wicked Priest as either Jonathan or Simon.

| Passage | Proposed identification(s) | Relevant external sources | Proposed excluded identification(s) | "Groningen" High Priest |
|---|---|---|---|---|
| "called by the name of truth when he first arose" [1QpHab 8.9–10] | Jonathan | cf. "King Jonathan Fragment" [4Q448] | Hellenized, pre-Hasmonean High Priests | Judas |
| "called by the name of truth when he first arose" [1QpHab 8.9–10] | Simon | 1 Macc. 13: 1–9, 34–40 | Hellenized, pre-Hasmonean High Priests | Judas |
| "called by the name of truth when he first arose" [1QpHab 8.9–10] | John Hyrcanus I | JA 13: 10.5–6 | Hellenized, pre-Hasmonean High Priests | Judas |
| "ruled over Israel" [1QpHab 8.10] | Any Hasmonean | 1 and 2 Macc. | Non-Hasmoneans | Judas |
| "robbed […] the men […] of violence who rebelled against God, and […] the peoples" [1QpHab 8.12–13] | John Hyrcanus I | JA 43: 10.2 | | Judas |
| "rebelled and violated the precepts [of God]" [1QpHab 8.17–18] | cf. 1QpHab 11.5–8 | | | Alcimus |
| "disease and took vengeance upon his body of flesh" [1QpHab 9.1–2] | Aristobulus I | JA 13: 11.3 | John Hyrcanus I John Hyrcanus II and Aristobulus II | Alcimus |
| "disease and took vengeance upon his body of flesh" [1QpHab 9.1–2] | Alexander Jannaeus | JA 13: 15.5 | John Hyrcanus I John Hyrcanus II and Aristobulus II | Alcimus |
| "disease and took vengeance upon his body of flesh" [1QpHab 9.1–2] | Alcimus | 1 Macc. 9.54; JA 12: 10.6 | John Hyrcanus I John Hyrcanus II and Aristobulus II | Alcimus |
| "last Priests of Jerusalem […] delivered into the hands of the army of the Kittim" [1QpHab 9.6–9] | John Hyrcanus II and Aristobulus II | JA 14: 2.3, 3.1, 14: 4.5, 7.1 | Post-Hasmoneans | [last Hasmonean Priests] |
| "delivered into the hands of his enemies" [1QpHab 9.8–9] | Jonathan | 1 Macc. 13 | Simon (1 Mac. 16:14–16); Jason (2 Mac. 5.7–9); Alcimus (1 Mac. 9.54–56) | Jonathan |
| "delivered into the hands of his enemies" [1QpHab 9.8–9] | Alexander Jannaeus | JA 13:13.5 | Simon (1 Mac. 16:14–16); Jason (2 Mac. 5.7–9); Alcimus (1 Mac. 9.54–56) | Jonathan |
| "stones might be laid in oppression and the beam of its woodwork in robbery" [1QpHab 10.1–2] | Alexander Jannaeus | JA 13: 13.5, 15.1 | | Simon |
| "stones might be laid in oppression and the beam of its woodwork in robbery" [1QpHab 10.1–2] | John Hyrcanus I | JA 18: 4.3 | | Simon |
| "pursued the Teacher of Righteousness to his house of exile […]for the Day of Atonement" [1QpHab 11.5–8] | Alexander Jannaeus | JA 13: 13.5 cf. 4Q171 4.7–10 | | John Hyrcanus I |
| "walked in the ways of drunkenness" [1QpHab 11.14] | Alexander Jannaeus | JA 13: 15.5 | | Alexander Jannaeus |
| "walked in the ways of drunkenness" [1QpHab 11.14] | Simon | 1 Macc. 16: 11–17 | | Alexander Jannaeus |
| "defiled the Temple of God […] robbed the Poor" [1QpHab 12.9–10] | Alexander Jannaeus | JA 13: 13.5, 14.1–2 | | Alexander Jannaeus |
| "that he might put him to death [because of the ordinance] and the law which he sent him" [1QpPs^{a} 4.8–9] | Alexander Jannaeus | cf. 1QpHab 11.5–8 | | |
| "delivering him into the hand of the violent of the nations" [1QpPs^{a} 4.11–12] | Jonathan | cf. 1QpHab 9.8–9 | All but John Hyrcanus I, Aristobulus I, and Alexander Jannaeus | |

=== Jonathan ===
Jonathan is the most commonly identified single candidate for the identity of the Wicked Priest. The most popularly accepted piece of evidence for the identification of Jonathan is his "death at the hands of the Gentiles," a characteristic shared only by Menelaus (172–162 BCE), who is generally chronologically excluded. 1 Maccabees 13 recounts the capture and execution of Jonathan at Bascama (in modern Jordan) by Diodotus Tryphon, the general of Seleucid King Alexander Balas, which some have attempted to fit with this incident. However, there is no compelling textual basis that the "enemies" who "took vengeance on this body of flesh" (1QpHab 9.2) need be Gentiles. Nor can Jonathan be accurately said to have died of "disease."

The so-called "King Jonathan Fragment" (4Q448) has been used both to argue against his identification or for it by connecting it to the Wicked Priest to having been originally "called by the name of truth."

=== Alexander Jannaeus ===
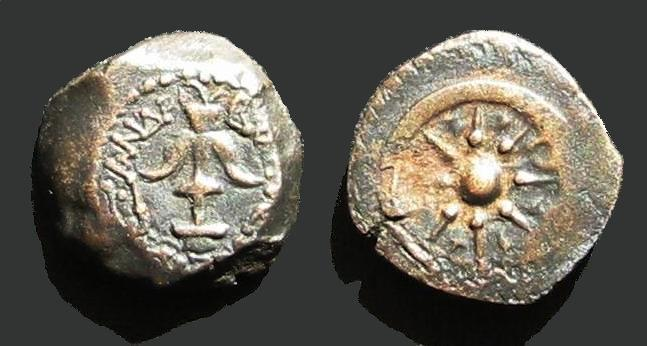
Coin of Alexander Jannaeus (103 to 76 BCE). Obv: Seleucid anchor and Greek Legend: BASILEOS ALEXANDROU "King Alexander". Rev: Eight-spoke wheel or star within diadem. Hebrew legend inside the spokes: "Yehonatan the King".

Alexander Jannaeus died, according to Josephus, of quartan fever and alcoholism, which has been compared to the references to "disease" and "drunkenness" of the Wicked Priest. Jannaeus also may lay claim to the "delivered into the hands of his enemies" passage because, according to Jewish Antiquities (13:13.5), he succumbed to an ambush by "Obedas, the King of the Arabs" before escaping to Jerusalem. The same passage has also been suggested as a pun on Jannaeus's verbose moniker (as attested to by contemporary coins, pictured) —Yehonathan ("Yahweh gave"), often shorted as Yannai—a pun which allegedly also occurs in 1QpHab 10.3–5.

Jannaeus's "fortification, or beautification" of Jerusalem has been compared to the Wicked Priest's illicit building activities. The Wicked Priests pursuit of the Teacher of Righteousness to the "house of his exile" (1QpHab 11.6) on the "Day of Atonement" (11.7–8) has also been compared to Jannaeus's known attack on the Pharisees on the Feast of Tabernacles.

=== Antigonus Mattathias ===
Antigonus Mattathias was proposed as the figure of the Wicked Priest in 2013 by Gregory Doudna. Antigonus was the last Hasmonean king of Israel, executed by the Romans in 37 BCE.

Doudna also proposes that Hyrcanus II was seen as the Teacher of Righteousness. According to Doudna, Hyrcanus II's sectarian orientation is now generally understood to have been Sadducee; whereas Antigonus was more sympathetic towards the Pharisees.

=== Multiple Wicked Priests ===
Several scholars argue that there is no one High Priest who is the strongest candidate for identification with each of the Wicked Priest passages. The different demises of the Wicked Priest and the tenses associated with them are often cited as evidence of the impossibility of a single Wicked Priest.

Biblical examples of a title applied to a series of successors include Daniel 11, (Note: γ: Daniel 11 was extant in the Qumran corpus: 4QDanc: 11.1–2, 13–17, 25–29; 4QDana: 11:13–16; pap6QDan: 11:33–36, 38. The relevant phrase is extant in the first two scrolls.) where "King of the North" and "King of the South" can apply to multiple Seleucid and Ptolemaic kings, respectively; other potential sobriquets and titles in the pesharim that can refer to a multiplicity of people include: the "Teacher of Righteousness" (both the founder and future eschatological teacher of the Qumran community), the "Searcher of the Law" (both the Teacher of Righteousness and another eschatological figure), and "Anointed" (both past prophets and future priests or kings).

==== Groningen hypothesis ====
The "Groningen hypothesis" advanced by Florentino García Martinez, later together with A.S. van der Woude, interprets columns 8 to 12 of 1QpHab as describing six Wicked Priests in chronological (but not absolute, sequential order as Aristobulus I is excluded). The six "Groningen" High Priests are: Judas Maccabeus (8.8–13), Alcimus (8.16–9.2), Jonathan (9.9–12), Simon (9.16–10.5), John Hyrcanus I (11.4–8), and Alexander Jannaeus (11.12–12.10). The pontificate of Alexander Jannaeus was to overlap with the writing of the Habakkuk Commentary but not the life of the Teacher of Righteousness.

The "Groningen hypothesis" argues that relative clauses and the perfect are used to describe (and disambiguate) the first five Wicked Priests, while an absolute clause and the imperfect are used to describe the sixth Wicked Priest. However, Lim contends that this requires the granting of "a number of debatable changes to the text," and argues that the relative pronoun is used in the final columns in relation to the "sixth" Wicked Priest. Furthermore, the "second" and "fourth" Wicked Priests are not explicitly referred to as such in the Habakkuk Commentary but rather "the priest who rebelled" (8.16) and "the [Priest] who…" (9.16), respectively.

The positing of Judas as the "first" Wicked Priest is attested to in Josephus (JA 12:4.14, 19, 34), but later contradicted (20: 10.3), and precluded by 1 Maccabees 9, which states that Judas died before Alcimus. Van der Woude reverts to 1 Maccabees 9 for the order of the High Priests. John Hyrcanus I is assigned the role of the "fifth" Wicked Priest—the one who pursues the Teacher of Righteousness to his house of exile—merely because it fits the preconceived sequence and in the absence of any documentary evidence. John Hyrcanus I is chosen over Aristobulus I only because of the shortness of the latter's reign.

=== Other ===
Some alternative identifications of the Wicked Priest include Robert Eisenman suggesting it was Ananus ben Ananus, and Barbara Thiering suggesting it was Jesus of Nazareth.

== Bibliography ==
- Abbegg, Martin, Jr., Flint, Peter, and Ulrich, Eugene. 1999. The Dead Sea Scrolls Bible. San Francisco: HarperCollins Publishers Inc. ISBN 0-06-060063-2
- Bernstein, M. 2000. "Pesher Habakkuk." In Encyclopedia of the Dead Sea Scrolls. Eds. Schiffzmann, L.H., and Vanderkam, J.C. Oxford: Oxford University Press. II: 647–650. ISBN 0-19-508450-0
- Brook, G. 1994. "The Pesharim and the Origins of the Dead Sea Scrolls." In Methods of Investigation of the Dead Sea Scrolls and the Khirbet Qumran Site: Present Realities and Future Prospects. Ed. M. Wise et al. New York: New York Academy of Sciences. pp. 339–353. ISBN 0-8018-6090-3
- Brownlee, William H. 1952. "The Historical Allusions of the Dead Sea Habakkuk Midrash." Bulletin of the American Schools of Oriental Research 126: 10–20.
- Brownlee, William H. 1982. "The Wicked Priest, the Man of Lies, and the Righteous Teacher: The Problem of Identity." The Jewish Quarterly Review 73 (1): 1–37.
- Buchanan, G.W. 1969. "The Priestly Teacher of Righteousness." Revue de Qumrân 6: 553–558.
- Callaway, Phillip R. 1988. The History of the Qumran Community. Sheffeld: Sheffeld Academic Press. ISBN 1-85075-107-2
- Collins, J.J. 1989. "The Origins of the Qumran Community: A Review of the Evidence." In To Touch the Text: Biblical and Related Studies in Honor of Joseph A. Fitzmyer, S.J. Eds. M.P. Horgan and P.J. Kobelski. New York: Crossroad: 159–178.
- Cross, Frank M. 1958 (rev. eds. 1961, 1980). The Ancient Library of Qumran and Modern Biblical Studies. Garden City, New York: Doubleday and Co. ASIN B0007DM3E6ISBN 978-0-8371-9281-9
- Davies, Philip R. 1985. "Eschatology at Qumran." Journal of Biblical Literature 104 (1): 39–55.
- Davies, Philip R. 1987. Behind the Essenes: History and Ideology in the Dead Sea Scrolls. Atlanta: Scholars Press. ISBN 1-55540-140-6
- Eisenman, Robert. 2012. James the Brother of Jesus and the Dead Sea Scrolls I The Historical James, Paul the Enemy, and Jesus' Brothers as Apostles. Nashville: Grave Distractions Publications. ISBN 0-98-559913-8
- García Martínez, Florentino. 1988. "Qumran Origins and Early History: A Groningen Hypothesis." Folia Orientalia 25: 113–136.
- García Martínez, Florentino, and van der Woude, A.S. 1990. "A ‘Groningen’ Hypothesis of Qumran Early Origins and Early History." Revue de Qumrân 14: 521–542.
- Jull, A.J. Timothy, Donahue, Douglas J., Broshi, Magen, and Tov, Emmanuel. 1995. "Radiocarbon Dating of Scrolls and Linen Fragments from the Judean Desert." Radiocarbon 37 (1): 11–19.
- Lim, Timothy H. 1990. "Eschatological Orientation and the Alteration of Scripture in the Habakkuk Pesher." Journal of Near Eastern Studies, 49 (2): 185–194.
- Lim, Timothy H. 1992. "The Qumran scrolls: Two hypotheses." Studies in Religion 21 (4):455–466.
- Lim, Timothy H. 1993. "The Wicked Priests of the Groningen Hypothesis." Journal of Biblical Literature 112 (3): 415–425.
- Lim, Timothy H. 2001. "An Alleged Reference to the Tripartite Division of the Hebrew Bible." Revue de Qumrân 77: 23–37.
- Lim, Timothy H. 2002. Pesharim. New York: Sheffield Academic Press. ISBN 1-84127-273-6
- Milik, Józef T. 1959. Ten Years of Discovery in the Wilderness of Judaea. Oxford: Basil Blackwell. ASIN B000JFMOUAISBN 978-0-334-01604-5
- Murphy-O’Connor, Jerome. 1977. "The Essenes in Palestine." The Biblical Archeologist 40 (3): 100–124.
- Nickelsburg, George W. E. Jr. 1976. "Simon: A Priest with a Reputation for Faithfulness." Bulletin of the American Schools of Oriental Research 223: 67–68.
- Rabin, Chaim. 1957. Qumran Studies. Oxford: Oxford University Press. ISBN 0-8371-9060-6
- Rabinowitz, Isaac. 1951. "The Authorship, Audience and Date of the de Vaux Fragment of an Unknown Work." Journal of Biblical Literature 71 (1): 19–32.
- Segal, H.M. 1951. "The Habakkuk ‘Commentary’ and the Damascus Fragments: A Historical Study." Journal of Biblical Literature 70 (2): 131–147.
- Teicher, J.L. 1951. "The Dead Sea Scrolls—Documents of the Jewish-Christian Sect of Ebionites." Journal of Jewish Studies 2: 67–99.
- Thiering, B. 1978. "Once More the Wicked Priest." Journal of Biblical Literature 97: 191–205.
- van der Water, Rick. 2003. "The Punishment of the Wicked Priest and the Death of Judas." Dead Sea Discoveries 10 (3): 395–419.
- van der Woude, A.S. 1982. "Wicked Priest or Wicked Priests? Reflections on the Identification of the Wicked Priest in the Habakkuk Commentary in Essays in Honour of Yigael Yadin." Journal of Jewish Studies London 33 (1–2): 349–59.
- van der Woude, A.S. 1996. "Once again: The wicked priests in the Habakkuk Pesher from Cave 1 of Qumran." Revue de Qumrân 17: 375–384.
- Vermes, Géza. 1977 (3rd. ed. 1987). The Dead Sea Scrolls. Cleveland: William Collins & World Publishing Co. Inc.
- Vermes, Géza. 1993. "The So-Called King Jonathan Fragment (4Q448)." Journal of Jewish Studies 44: 294–300.
- Vermes, Géza. 1999. An Introduction to the Dead Sea Scrolls. London: Fortress Press.
- Vermes, Géza. 2004 (Rev. edn.). The Complete Dead Sea Scrolls in English. London: Penguin Books. ISBN 0-14-027807-9
- Weis, P.R. 1950. "The Date of the Habakkuk Scroll." The Jewish Quarterly Review 41 (2): 125–154.
