= Teacher of Righteousness =

Unknown priest in the Dead Sea Scrolls

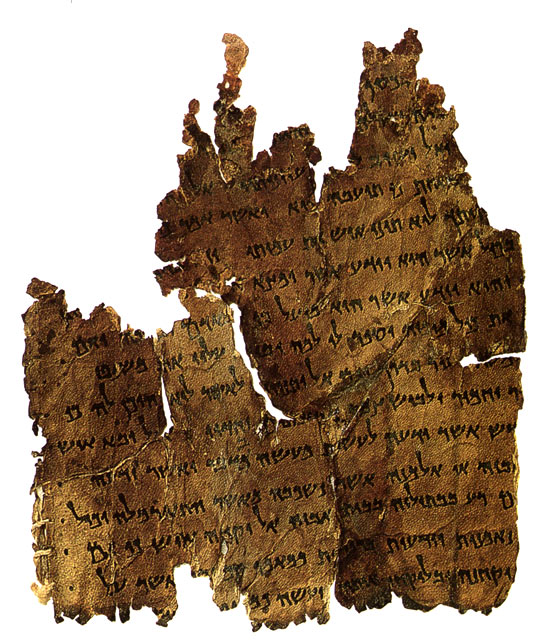
Page from the Damascus Document

The Teacher of Righteousness (Hebrew: מורה הצדק, romanized: moré haṣṣeḏeq) is a mysterious figure found in some of the Dead Sea Scrolls at Qumran, most prominently in the Damascus Document (CD), which speaks briefly of the origins of the sect, 390 years after the Neo-Babylonian Empire captured Jerusalem in 586 BCE. After another 20 years of study and waiting, "God... raised for them a Teacher of Righteousness to guide them in the way of His heart".

The Teacher potentially references the fulfillment of the prophecy in Joel 2:23: "Children of Zion, exult and be glad with the Lord your God, for He has given you a teacher for righteousness..."

The Teacher is described as the one "to whom God made known all the mysteries of the words of his servants the prophets" – 1QpHab 7:5) and being the one through whom God would reveal to the community "the hidden things in which Israel had gone astray".

Although the exact identity of the Teacher is unknown, based on the text of the Community Rule, the teachers of the sect are identified as Kohanim (priests) of patrilineal progeny of Zadok (the first high priest to serve in Solomon's Temple), leading scholars to conclude the Teacher was a priest of Zadokite lineage.

== Identity ==
=== The missing High Priest of 159–152 BC ===
One theory initially advocated by Jerome Murphy-O'Connor and subsequently by Stegemann is that the Teacher of Righteousness served as High Priest but was subsequently ousted by Jonathan Apphus. In 1 Maccabees, no High Priest is named for the period from the death of Alcimus in 159 BC to the claiming of the position of High Priest by Jonathan on the authority of Alexander Balas in 152 BC (1 Macc 10:18–20). From this, it could be concluded that there was no High Priest for these years, and indeed Josephus, drawing heavily on 1 Maccabees at this point in his history, comes to that conclusion (Ant. 20.237). It is improbable, however, that the office remained completely vacant for these years. Stegemann suggests that the reason that nothing is said in 1 Maccabees about a High Priest between Alcimus and Jonathan was apologetic: to conceal the fact that the Hasmoneans obtained the High Priesthood by usurping it from its rightful holder, the Teacher of Righteousness. Alvar Ellegård follows this line and argues that the Teacher of Righteousness was not only the leader of the Essenes at Qumran, but was also considered something of a precursor to Jesus Christ about 150 years before the time of the Gospels. In 1965, the Dead Sea Scrolls document known as Melchizedek, dated to around 100 BCE, revealed that the Essenes were waiting for this Melchizedek (מַלְכִּי־צֶדֶק, romanized: malkī-ṣeḏeq, 'King of Righteousness') High Priest and King Messiah. The Essenes also wrote in this document that they knew the time of his appearing due to the prophecies written in Daniel.

=== A 1st-century BCE figure ===
While, early on, the academic consensus was that the Teacher of Righteousness belonged to the second century BCE, several scholars also proposed that he was active in the first century BCE. For example, this was argued back in 1961 by André Dupont-Sommer, who claimed that the Teacher was put to death around 65–63 BCE.

Dupont-Sommer also noted remarkable similarities between Jesus and the Teacher of Righteousness. "Jesus," he claimed, "appears in many respects as an astonishing reincarnation of the Teacher of Righteousness. Like the latter, he preached penitence, poverty, humility, love of one's neighbor, chastity.... Like him, he was the Elect and the Messiah of God.... Like him, he was the object of the hostility of the priests.... Like him, he was condemned and put to death. Like him he pronounced judgment on Jerusalem, which was taken and destroyed by the Romans for having put him to death.... Like him, he founded a Church whose adherents fervently awaited his glorious return.... All these similarities -- and here I only touch upon the subject -- taken together constitute a very impressive whole."

Similarly, in his 1999 work, Michael O. Wise suggested that the Teacher of Righteousness was the "first messiah", a figure predating Jesus by roughly 100 years. This figure, who may have been named Judah, rose to prominence during the reign of Alexander Jannaeus (103-76 BCE), and had been a priest and confidant to the king.

According to Wise, he became dissatisfied with the religious sects in Jerusalem and, in reaction, founded a "crisis cult". While amassing a following, the Teacher (and his followers) said he was the fulfillment of various Biblical prophecies, with an emphasis on those found in the Book of Isaiah. The religious leadership in Jerusalem eventually killed the Teacher, and his followers said he was a messianic figure who had been exalted to the presence of God's throne. They then anticipated that the Teacher would return to judge the wicked and lead the righteous into a golden age, which would take place within the next forty years.

Wise said that dating of manuscript copies among the Dead Sea Scrolls shows that the Teacher's postmortem following drastically increased in size over several years, and that when the predicted return and golden age failed to materialize his following dissipated rapidly.

James Tabor recommends Wise's book for examining how the career of the Qumran Teacher may have been a precursor for that of Jesus "Yeshua", who was part of the Essene community. Tabor also points out that a prominent scholar Israel Knohl was also developing these same ideas at the same time as Wise; their two books were published almost simultaneously, without one author being aware of the other's work. In his book, Knohl argued that the Teacher of Righteousness was a messianic figure who lived a generation before Jesus, and that he was killed by Roman soldiers during a revolt in 4 BCE.

Later, Wise developed his ideas further. After making a detailed catalogue of all direct historical references found in the Dead Sea Scrolls, he pointed out that these references concentrate primarily in the first half of the first century BCE. This is when the persons and events underlying these references can be located. From this, Wise concluded that this is when the Qumran movement was flourishing. According to Wise,

"Another synthesis is at least equally viable, one that places the Teacher late in the second century B.C.E. and early in the first, fifty or sixty years later than the consensus view."

==== Hyrcanus II ====
Along these same lines is the proposal that Hyrcanus II was the Teacher of Righteousness. This was proposed in 2013 by Gregory Doudna. Hyrcanus was High Priest from 76 to 67 BCE and 63 to 40 BCE. According to Doudna, Hyrcanus II’s sectarian orientation is generally understood as Sadducee. Further, according to this hypothesis, Antigonus II Mattathias would have been seen as the Wicked Priest. Antigonus was the last Hasmonean king. He ruled only for three years and was executed by the Romans in 37 BCE. Antigonus was supported by the Pharisees.

=== A Sadducee priest ===
Other documents from the Dead Sea Scrolls portray the Teacher as involved in a heavy conflict against a figure termed the "Wicked Priest," which has led to several proposals for their identity: a Sadducee (Zadokite) priest as the Teacher, possibly even the legitimate High Priest, against a "wicked" Jonathan Apphus. "Zadok" translates as "righteous" in Hebrew.

=== Hillel against Shammai ===
Rabbi Harvey Falk identifies Hillel the Elder as the Teacher against a "wicked" Shammai, a significant conflict mentioned in the Jerusalem Talmud, Shabbat 1:4. Most scholars date the Damascus Document and many of the Dead Sea Scrolls to the decades around the year 100 BCE, vastly predating Hillel and Shammai.

=== James, Brother of Jesus ===
Robert Eisenman has proposed that James, brother of Jesus, of the Nazarenes, was the Teacher of Righteousness against the Wicked Priest Ananus ben Ananus, and a "Spouter of Lies" whom Eisenman identifies as Paul the Apostle. This theory is rejected by mainstream scholarship, as the Dead Sea Scrolls date to around 100 BCE, predating James by almost 200 years.

=== Judah the Essene ===
Stephen Goranson suggests that Judah the Essene, mentioned by Josephus, is the Teacher.

=== John the Baptist ===
Barbara Thiering questions the dating of the Dead Sea Scrolls and suggests that the Teacher of Righteousness preached a future fiery judgment, has said "the axe is laid to the roots of the tree," called people "vipers," practiced baptism and lived in the wilderness of Judea. Due to these reasons, she believes there is a strong possibility that the Teacher of Righteousness was John the Baptist. Her belief is based on the idea that the Dead Sea Scrolls were written in code.

=== More than one Teacher of Righteousness ===
Richard A. Freund said that multiple theories could all be true, as there may have been more than one Teacher of Righteousness: "perhaps... A Teacher of Righteousness did lead the group in the second century BCE when it was established. Another... led the sect in the first century BCE and finally another... in the first century CE."
