= Jonathan Apphus =

Leader of the Hasmonean dynasty from 160 to 143 BCE

- 16th-century French artist’s impression of Jonathan Apphus, from Guillaume Rouillé's Promptuarii Iconum Insigniorum

Leader of the Maccabees
- Reign: 160–143 BCE
- Predecessor: Judas Maccabeus
- Successor: Simon Thassi

High Priest of Judaea
- Reign: 152-143 BCE
- Predecessor: Unknown
- Successor: Simon Thassi
- Died: 143 BCE; Baskama
- Burial: Modi'in
- Dynasty: Hasmonean
- Father: Mattathias
- Religion: Second Temple Judaism

Jonathan Apphus (Hebrew: יוֹנָתָן אַפְּפוּס Yōnāṯān ʾApfūs; Ancient Greek: Ἰωνάθαν Ἀπφοῦς, Iōnáthan Apphoûs) was one of the sons of Mattathias and the leader of the Hasmonean dynasty of Judea from 160 to 143 BCE.

== Name ==
H J Wolf notes that all of Mattathias' sons listed in 1 Maccabees 2:2–5 had double names: John is said to have been called Gaddis; Simon, Thassi; Judas, Maccabeus; Eleazar, Avaran; and Jonathan, Apphus. Jewish historian Uriel Rappaport writes that "we do not have an explanation for the nicknames of Mattathias' sons". Wolf suggests that the name was given to him by Mattathias and that the common explanation of the word "Apphus" relates it to the Syriac choppus, "the dissembler". The International Standard Bible Encyclopedia's article on the Maccabees suggests the meaning is "the wary", but Torrey (in the Encyclopedia Biblica article, "Maccabees") points out that we have no means of ascertaining with what guttural consonant the word began, or what Semitic consonant the Greek "s" represents, and so "both the form and meaning of the name are, therefore, still to be explained".

== Leader of the Jews ==
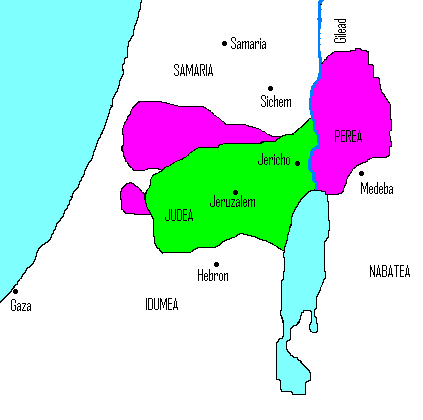
Judea under Jonathan Maccabaeus situation in 160 BC area conquered

According to the narrative in 1 Maccabees, Jonathan Apphus was the youngest of the five sons of Mattathias. His father was a priest credited as the founding figure of the rebellion of the Maccabees against Antiochus IV Epiphanes of the Seleucid Empire. However Mattathias died in 167 BCE while the rebellion was only beginning.

He was survived by Jonathan and his brothers Eleazar Avaran, Johanan (John Gaddi), Judah Maccabee, and Simon Thassi. They were sworn to continue the rebellion of their father. Judah soon became their leader and the military chief of the rebellion.

Jonathan served under his brother and took active parts in the battles against the Seleucid forces. Judah fell in the Battle of Elasa (161/160 BCE) against Bacchides, a Seleucid general under Demetrius I Soter. Bacchides proceeded with crushing rigor against the Maccabean party while at the same time a famine broke out in the land. The Jewish rebels required a new leader and Jonathan was chosen.

Jonathan noticed that Bacchides was trying to entrap him. He reacted by retiring with his brothers Simon and John, and his followers to a desert region in the country east of the Jordan River. They set camp near a morass by the name of Asphar. But Bacchides followed him there and overtook them during Shabbat. Jonathan gave all the baggage into the hands of his brother John who took a small force and headed towards the friendly Nabataeans. The plan was to secure their baggage there but the "sons of Jambri of Medeba", a hostile tribe apparently, ambushed them during their journey. John and his companions were killed and their cargo was looted. Subsequently, Jonathan was informed that one of the sons of Jambri was leading home a noble bride in great pomp, the Maccabean brothers proceeded to Medaba, ambushed the bridal procession, killed the entire party, to the number of 300, and seized all the treasure.

Jonathan and his companions met Bacchides in battle at the River Jordan. Jonathan had encountered and had raised his hand to slay Bacchides, when the latter evaded the blow; the Jews, defeated, sought refuge by swimming through the Jordan to the eastern bank. In this battle Bacchides is reported to have lost either 1,000 or 2,000 men and he did not make another attempt to cross the river, instead returning to Jerusalem. Jonathan and his forces remained in the swamp in the country east of the Jordan. Following the death of Alcimus, High Priest in Jerusalem sometime later, Bacchides left the country.

== Turn of fate ==
However Jonathan was not idle. He continued activities against the Jews influenced by the Hellenistic civilization. Two years after the departure of Bacchides from Judea, Acra felt sufficiently threatened to contact Demetrius and request the return of Bacchides to their territory.

Jonathan was now more experienced in guerrilla warfare, the primary tactic used by the Maccabean forces, and was constantly on guard to avoid direct confrontations with enemy forces even while continuing hostile operations. A frustrated Bacchides reportedly took out his anger on the Hellenists and reportedly killed fifty of their leaders out of frustration. Jonathan and Simeon thought it well to retreat farther, and accordingly fortified in the desert a place called Beth-hogla; there they were besieged several days by Bacchides.

Jonathan perceived that Bacchides regretted having set out. He contacted the rival general with offers of a peace treaty and exchange of prisoners of war. Bacchides readily consented and even took an oath of nevermore making war upon Jonathan. He and his forces then vacated Judea. The victorious Jonathan now took up his residence in the old city of Michmash. From there he endeavored to clear the land of "the godless and the apostate".

== High Priest ==
Jonathan appears to have used this peaceful period to good advantage, for he was soon in possession of great power. An important external event brought the design of the Maccabeans to fruition. Demetrius I Soter's relations with Attalus II Philadelphus of Pergamon (reigned 159 - 138 BCE), Ptolemy VI of Egypt (reigned 163 - 145 BCE) and his co-ruler Cleopatra II of Egypt were deteriorating. They supported rival claimant to the throne Alexander Balas, who claimed to be the son of Antiochus IV Epiphanes and a first cousin of Demetrius, against him.

Demetrius was now forced to recall the garrisons of Judea, except those at Jerusalem's Akra fortress and at Beth-zur; he also made a bid for the loyalty of Jonathan, whom he permitted to recruit an army and to take the hostages kept in the Akra fortress. Jonathan gladly accepted these terms and took up residence at Jerusalem in 153 BCE. He soon began fortifying the city.

Alexander Balas also contacted Jonathan with even more favorable terms. Including official appointment as High Priest in Jerusalem. Withdrawing his support from Demetrius and declaring allegiance to Alexander, Jonathan was the first member of his dynasty to achieve appointment as High Priest. The title was not merely nominal. Jonathan became the official leader of his people and the Hellenistic party could no longer attack him without severe consequences. On the Feast of Tabernacles of 152 BCE, Jonathan put on the High Priest's garments and officiated for the first time. It is unknown whom Jonathan displaced as High Priest, though some scholars suggest that this was the Teacher of Righteousness, later founder of the Essenes. In this theory, Jonathan is considered the "Wicked Priest".

Jonathan had determined to side with Alexander Balas, not trusting Demetrius, who in a second letter made promises that he could hardly have kept and conceded prerogatives that were almost impossible. Demetrius subsequently lost his throne and life in 150 BCE. Alexander Balas was victorious and sole ruler of the Seleucid Empire. He was given the further honor of marriage to Cleopatra Thea, daughter of his allies Ptolemy VI and Cleopatra II.

The wedding took place in Ptolemais in the presence of Ptolemy VI. Jonathan was invited but arrived after the wedding ceremony while celebrations continued. He appeared with presents for both kings, and was permitted to sit between them as their equal; Balas even clothed him with his own royal garment and otherwise accorded him high honor. He would not listen to the Hellenistic party that still accused Jonathan, but appointed Jonathan as strategos and "meridarch" (i.e., civil governor of a province; details not found in Josephus), and sent him back with honors to Jerusalem.

== Victory over Apollonius ==
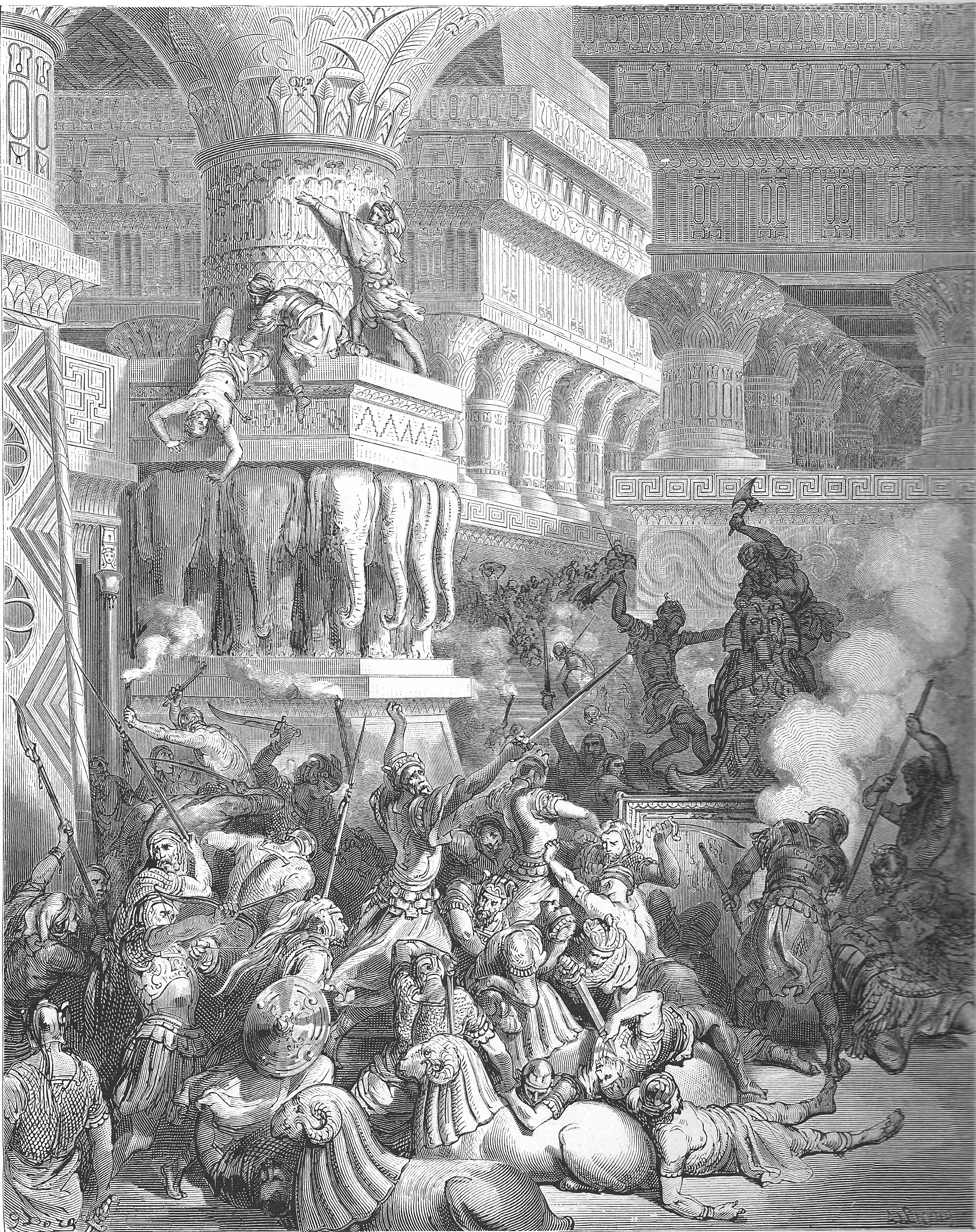
Jonathan destroying the temple of Dagon, by Gustave Doré

Jonathan proved grateful. In 147 BCE, Demetrius II Nicator, a son of Demetrius I Soter, started claiming the throne against Alexander Balas. Apollonius Taos, governor of Coele-Syria was probably supporting Demetrius. But he used the opportunity to challenge Jonathan to battle, saying that the Jews might for once leave the mountains and venture out into the plain.

Jonathan and Simon led a force of 10,000 men against Jaffa where the forces of Apollonius lay. Not expecting an attack this early in the hostilities, Jaffa was not prepared for a siege, and the gates were opened before the Jewish forces out of fear.

But the victory was not yet certain. Apollonius received reinforcements from Azotus and appeared in the plain in charge of 3,000 men. They were clearly outnumbered, but Apollonius, relying on his superior cavalry, forced Jonathan to engage in battle. Jonathan assaulted, captured and, burned Azotus along with the resident temple of Dagon and the surrounding villages.

In reward of his victory, Alexander Balas granted the High Priest the city of Ekron, along with its outlying territory. The people of Azotus vainly complained to King Ptolemy VI, who had come to make war upon his son-in-law Alexander Balas, that Jonathan had destroyed their city and temple. Jonathan peacefully met Ptolemy at Jaffa and accompanied him as far as the River Eleutherus. He then returned to Jerusalem, maintaining peace with the King of Egypt despite their support for different contenders for the Seleucid throne.

== Under Demetrius II ==
In 145 BCE, the Battle of Antioch resulted in the final defeat of Alexander Balas by the forces of his father-in-law, Ptolemy VI. Ptolemy himself was however among the casualties of the battle. Demetrius II Nicator remained sole ruler of the Seleucid Empire and became the second husband of Cleopatra Thea.

Jonathan owed no allegiance to the new king, and took this opportunity to lay siege to the Seleucid fortress in Jerusalem and the symbol of Seleucid control over Judea. It was heavily garrisoned by a Seleucid force, and offered asylum to Jewish Hellenists. Demetrius was very angry; he appeared with an army at Ptolemais, and ordered Jonathan to come before him. Without raising the siege, Jonathan, accompanied by the elders and priests, went to the king, and pacified him with presents, so that the king not only confirmed him in his office of high priest, but gave to him the three Samaritan toparchies of Mount Ephraim, Lod, and Ramathaim-Zophim. In exchange for 300 talents of silver, the entire country was exempted from taxes, the exemption being confirmed in a letter which is preserved by I Maccabees and Josephus.

Soon, however, a new claimant to the Seleucid throne appeared in the young Antiochus VI Dionysus, son of Alexander Balas and Cleopatra Thea. He was three years old at most, but general Diodotus Tryphon used him to advance his own designs for the throne. In face of this new enemy, Demetrius promised to withdraw the garrison from Jerusalem, if Jonathan, who he now called his ally, would send troops. 3,000 of Jonathan's men protected Demetrius in his capital, Antioch, against his own subjects.

== Support for Tryphon ==
As Demetrius II did not keep his promise, Jonathan thought it better to support the new king when Diodotus Tryphon and Antiochus VI seized the capital. The latter confirmed all his rights and appointed his brother Simon strategos of the seacoast, from the "Ladder of Tyre" to the frontier of Egypt. Jonathan and Simon toured the region, removing Demetrius II's garrisons; Ashkelon submitted voluntarily, while Gaza was taken by force. Jonathan defeated a force of Demetrius II which invaded from the north, in the plain of Azor, and drove them back over the Eleutherius River. Meanwhile, Simon took the strong fortress of Beth Zur and replaced Demetrius II's garrison with his own.

Sources report that Jonathan sought alliances with foreign peoples at this time. He renewed the treaty with the Roman Republic, and exchanged friendly messages with Sparta and other places.

== Capture by Diodotus Tryphon and death ==
In 143 BCE, Diodotus Tryphon went with an army to Judea and invited Jonathan to Scythopolis for a friendly conference, and persuaded him to dismiss his army of 40,000 men, promising to give him Ptolemais and other fortresses. Jonathan fell into the trap; he took with him to Ptolemais 1,000 men, all of whom were slain; he himself was taken prisoner.

When Tryphon was about to enter Judea at Hadid, he was confronted by a battle-ready Simon. Tryphon, avoiding an engagement, demanded one hundred talents of silver and Jonathan's two sons as hostages, in return for which he promised to liberate Jonathan. Although Simon did not trust Tryphon, he complied with the request in order that he might not be accused of the death of his brother. Tryphon did not liberate his prisoner; angry that Simon blocked his way everywhere and that he could accomplish nothing, he executed Jonathan at Baskama, in the country east of the Jordan. Jonathan was buried by Simon at Modi'in. Nothing is known of his two captive sons. One of his daughters was an ancestor of Josephus.

== See also ==
- Jewish leadership
- List of Hasmonean and Herodian rulers

Jonathan Apphus Hasmonean Dynasty Died: 143 BCE
Jewish titles
Preceded by Judas Maccabaeus	Leader of the Maccabees; 160 BCE – 143 BCE	Succeeded by Simon
Last known predecessor Alcimus	High Priest of Jerusalem; 152 BCE – 143 BCE	Succeeded by Simon
