= Habakkuk Commentary =

Jewish religious text, one of the Dead Sea Scrolls

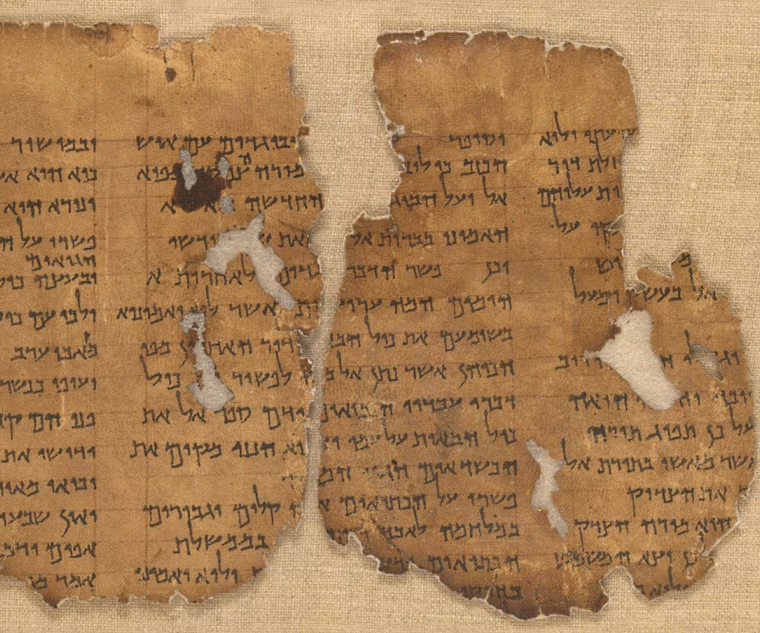
Beginning of the Habakkuk Commentary

The Habakkuk Commentary or Pesher Habakkuk, labelled 1QpHab (Cave 1, Qumran, pesher, Habakkuk), was among the original seven Dead Sea Scrolls discovered in 1947 and published in 1951. Due to its early discovery and rapid publication, as well as its relatively pristine preservation, 1QpHab is one of the most frequently researched and analyzed scrolls of the several hundred now known.

== Description ==
=== Physical ===
The scroll is roughly 141 centimetres (56 in) from end to end, with thirteen columns of Herodian script written on two pieces of leather, sewn together with linen thread. Most of the columns are missing their lowest lines; the first column is nearly completely lost, and there is a hole through the center of the second column. The third chapter of Habakkuk is missing entirely from the pesher, but it was left out intentionally, not destroyed by aging (most of the last column of the scroll is blank, clearly showing that the text of the pesher was complete). Regardless, the scroll is still largely readable, and editors have filled the lacunae with reasonable confidence.

=== Contents ===
The pesher relates several contemporary individuals to the scroll, though they also are only referred to with titles instead of names. The hero or leader that the community should follow is called the Teacher of Righteousness, a figure found in some other Dead Sea scrolls. The pesher argues that the Teacher has directly communed with God and received the true meaning of the scriptures. The Teacher has not yet been successfully identified with any historical figure, though Robert Eisenman argued its identification as James the Just in his 1997 book with that title.

Among the Teacher’s opponents were the Wicked Priest and the Man of the Lie. The Wicked Priest is portrayed as a false religious leader who was at one point trusted by the Teacher. Towards the end of the pesher, the Wicked Priest is reported to have been captured and tortured by his enemies. His true identity is also unlikely to be named with certainty, though just about every contemporary Hasmonean priest has at some point been suggested by scholars as the Wicked Priest. It is even argued that this was a title attributed to multiple individuals. The Man of the Lie is accused by the author of attempting to discredit the Teacher, as well as the Torah. His true name has likewise not yet been successfully identified with any historical figure, though Robert Eisenman argued its identification as Paul of Tarsus.

Also mentioned in passing by the author is a House of Absalom, which is accused of standing idle while the Man of the Lie worked against the Teacher. Unlike the others, this name is attributed only to a couple of historical figures, the most likely candidate being a supposedly Sadducean relative to Aristobulus II, named Absalom.

The author of the pesher reaches a similar solution to his difficult situation as the prophet Habakkuk had centuries before: perseverance through faith. He affirms that his community will not die at the hands of the wicked Judah. In turn, the power to retaliate against and judge the Kittim will be granted by God to the faithful.

== Comparison with the Masoretic Text ==
What is more significant than the commentary in the pesher is the quoted text of Habakkuk itself, which is very close to the Masoretic Text (for which the oldest complete copy dates to the 11th century AD). The biggest differences are word order, small grammatical variations, addition or omission of conjunctions, and spelling variations, but these are small enough not to change the meaning of the text.

== See also ==
- History in the Dead Sea Scrolls

== Bibliography ==
- Brownlee, William H. The Text of Habakkuk in the Ancient Commentary from Qumran. Journal of Biblical Literature Manuscript Series 11. Philadelphia: Society of Biblical Literature, 1959. (Scholarly analysis of one of the first scholars to work on the scroll, specifically on the Biblical texts quoted in it)
- Bruce, F.F.,"The Dead Sea Habakkuk Scroll," The Annual of Leeds University Oriental Society I (1958/59): 5–24. https://biblicalstudies.org.uk/pdf/ffb/habakkuk_bruce.pdf
- Burrows, Millar. The Dead Sea Scrolls of St. Mark's Monastery. New Haven: American Schools of Oriental Research, 1950. (Original scholarly publication of 1QpHab, predating the Discoveries in the Judean Desert series in which most of the rest of the Qumran material is published)
- Charlesworth, James H., Henry W. L. Rietz, Casey D. Elledge, and Lidija Novakovic. Pesharim, Other Commentaries, and Related Documents. The Dead Sea Scrolls: Hebrew, Aramaic, and Greek Texts with English Translations 6b. Louisville: Westminster John Knox, 2002. (More recent publication of the Hebrew text and English translation on facing pages)
- Cross, Frank Moore. The Ancient Library of Qumran. 3d ed. Minneapolis: Fortress, 1995. (General reading on the Dead Sea Scrolls in general, their discovery, and contents)
- Elliger, Karl. Studien zum Habakkuk–Kommentar vom Toten Meer. J.C.B. Mohr, Tübingen, 1955.
- Ingrassia, David,(2002)CLASS 3 Biblical Commentaries:Pesharim.Dead Sea Scrolls and the Bible, http://pastorcam.com/class_notes/deadsea/Class%203_Biblical_Commentaries.pdf
- Nitzan, Bilha. Pesher Hbakkuk: A Scroll from the Wilderness of Judaea (1QpHab) [Modern Hebrew]. Bialik Institute, Jerusalem, 1986.
- Troxel, Ronald. (2009) Lecture 24: 1QpHab & 4QMMT http://hebrew.wisc.edu/~rltroxel/JHL/Lect24.pdf
- Young, Ian.“Late Biblical Hebrew and The Qumran Pesher Habakkuk,” Journal of Hebrew Scriptures 8 (2008): 8–25.
