= 2nd century BC =

One hundred years, from 200 BC to 101 BC

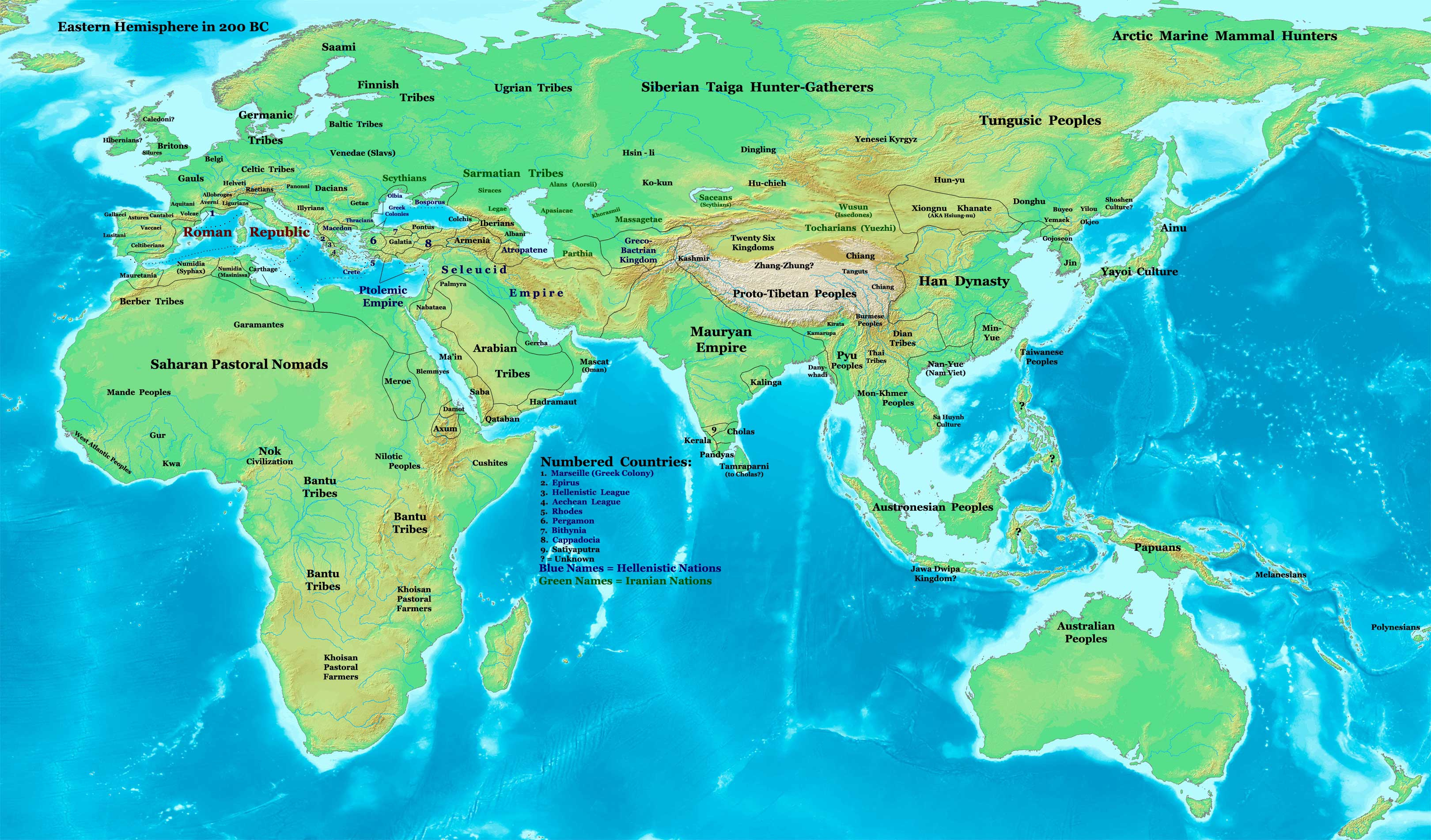
Map of the Eastern Hemisphere in 200 BC, the beginning of the second century BC.

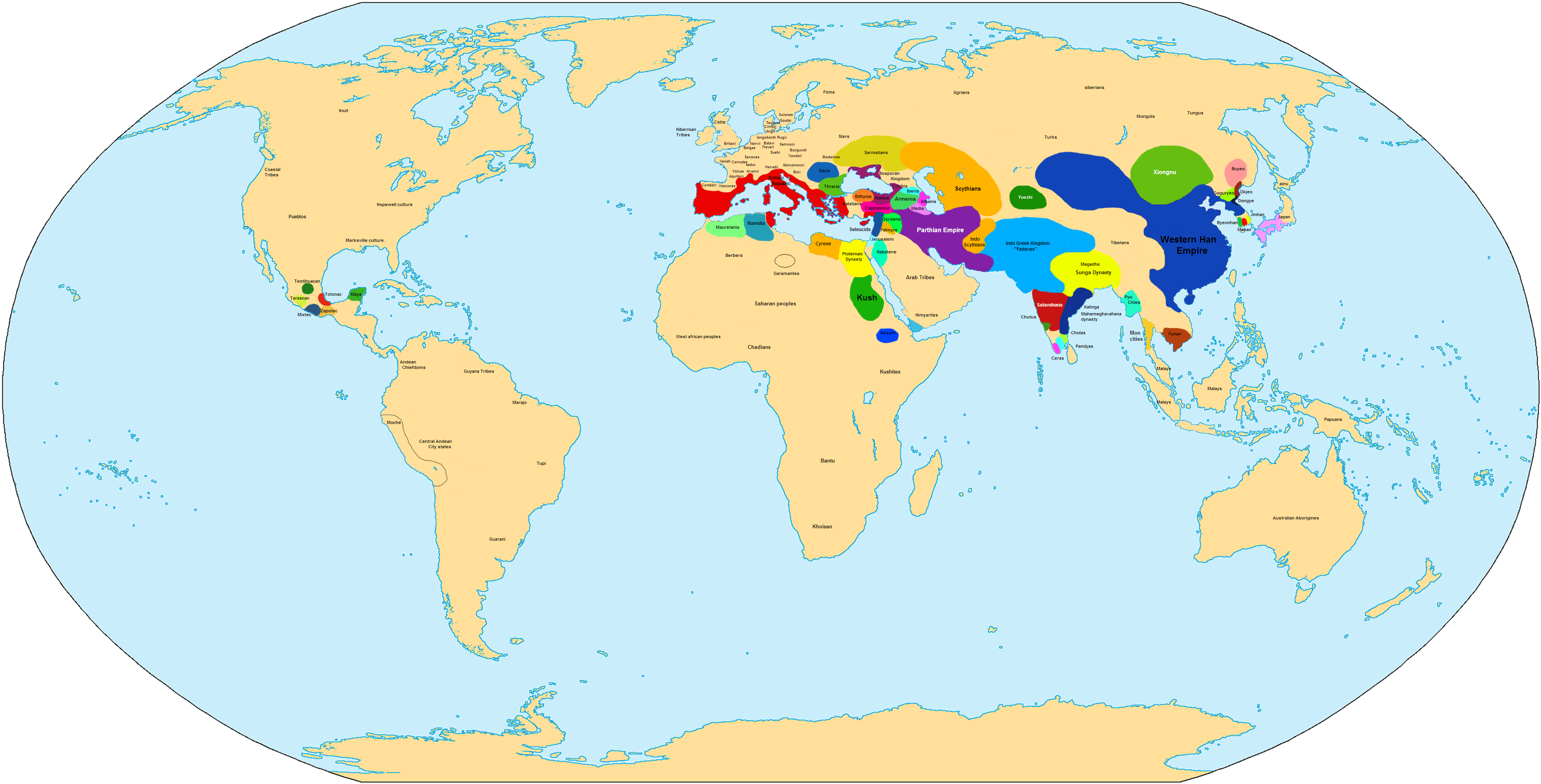
Map of the world in 100 BC, the end of the second century BC.

The 2nd century BC started the first day of 200 BC and ended the last day of 101 BC. It is considered part of the Classical era, although depending on the region being studied, other terms may be more suitable. It is also considered to be the end of the Axial Age. In the context of the Eastern Mediterranean, it is the mid-point of the Hellenistic period.

Fresh from its victories in the Second Punic War, the Roman Republic continued its expansion in the western Mediterranean, campaigning in the Iberian Peninsula throughout the century and annexing the North African coast after the destruction of the city of Carthage at the end of the Third Punic War. They became the dominant force in the Aegean by destroying Antigonid Macedonia in the Macedonian Wars and Corinth in the Achaean War. The Hellenistic kingdoms of Ptolemaic Egypt and Attalid Pergamon entered into subordinate relationships with the Romans – Pergamon was eventually annexed. The end of the century witnessed the evolution of the Roman army from a citizen army into a voluntary professional force, which later scholars would misattribute to putative reforms by noted general and statesman Gaius Marius (the so-called Marian Reforms).

In the Near East, the other major Hellenistic kingdom, the Seleucid Empire collapsed into civil war in the middle of the century, following the loss of Asia Minor to the Romans and the conquest of the Iranian plateau and Mesopotamia by the Parthian empire. Outlying regions became independent kingdoms, notably the Hasmonean kingdom in Judaea.

In East Asia, China reached a high point under the Han dynasty. The Han Empire extended its boundaries from Korea in the east to Vietnam in the South to the borders of modern-day Kazakhstan in the west. The nomadic Xiongnu were at the height of their power at the beginning of the century, collecting tribute from the Han. Their victories over the Yuezhi set off a chain of westward migrations in Central Asia. Han efforts to find allies against the Xiongnu by exploring the lands to their west would ultimately lead to the opening of the Silk Road.

In South Asia, the Mauryan Empire in India collapsed when Brihadnatha, the last emperor, was killed by Pushyamitra Shunga, a Mauryan general who founded of the Shunga Empire. The Greco-Bactrians crossed the Hindu Kush and established the Indo-Greek Kingdom, but lost their homeland in Bactria to the Sakas, themselves under pressure from the Yuezhi.

== Events ==
- 200 BC: Battle of Panium: Antiochus III of the Seleucid Empire defeats Ptolemy V of Egypt.
- c.200 BC: In ancient Philippines, the archipelago's indigenous people began to increase their contact with other nations in Southeast and East Asia, resulting in the establishment of fragmented city-states-like polities formed by complex sociopolitical units known as barangay or barangay states.

=== 190s BC ===
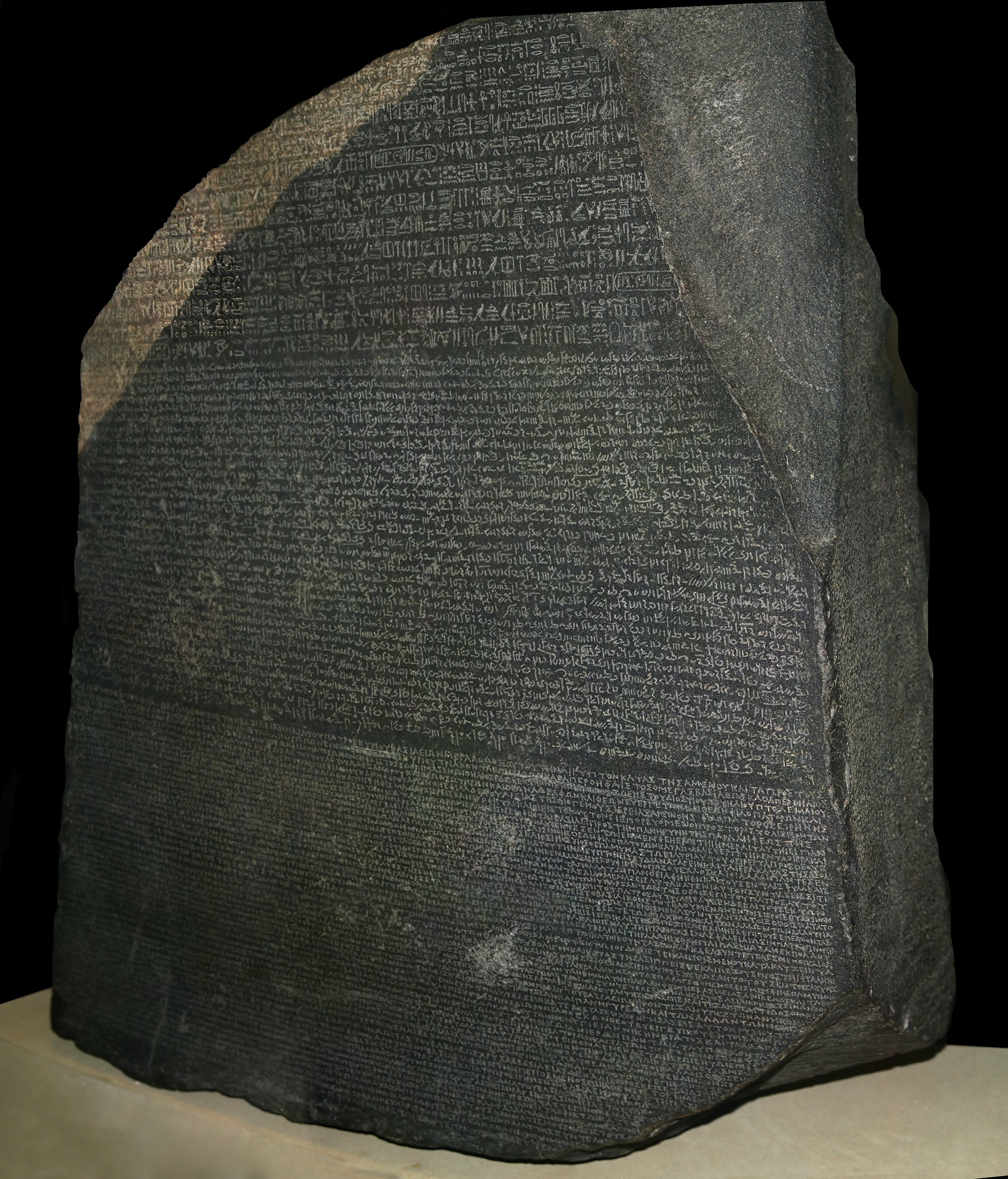
The Rosetta Stone, a trilingual decree recording the 196 BC coronation of Ptolemy V at Memphis in Egypt.

- 198 BC: Fifth Syrian War: Antiochus III takes control of Coele Syria and Judea.
  - (November 12): Antiochus issues a decree requiring registration of all Egyptians taken slave during the war (somata Aigyptia) for census purposes.
- 197 BC: (June) Flamininus defeats Philip V, king of Antigonid Macedonia at the Battle of Cynoscephalae, ending the Second Macedonian War.
- 196 BC:
  - (March 27) Upon reaching the age of 14, Ptolemy V Epiphanes is crowned as the King of Egypt at Memphis. The decree made in conjunction with the coronation, dated the first day of the Egyptian month of Pharmouthi, is written in the Egyptian language in both hieroglyphics and in demotic script, as well as in Greek on the Rosetta Stone, providing the key to deciphering the hieroglyphics almost 20 centuries later.
  - Lampsacus and Smyrna appeal to Rome for protection against Antiochus III's expansion into western Asia Minor and Thrace.
  - Empress Lü's execution of Han Xin leads to the Ying Bu rebellion.
- 195 BC:
  - (June 1) In China, Emperor Gaozu of Han dies and is succeeded by his 15-year-old son Prince Liu Ying. As the second Han dynasty ruler, Liu Ying is given the regnal name of Emperor Hui and reigns until his death in 188 BC at the age of 22. However, the true power resides with his mother, the Empress Lü Zhi, who serves as the Regent as widow of Gaozu.
  - The War against Nabis marks the end of Spartan power in Greece.
- 194 BC:
  - (April 4) The first Games of Megalesia and a festival are held in Rome after games were promised in honor of Cybele following Rome's triumph over Carthage in the Punic Wars. The festival and games last seven full days, closing on April 10.
  - Wiman of Gojoseon establishes Wiman Joseon in Korea.
- 192 BC:
  - The Yue Kingdom of Eastern Ou established in Zhejiang with Chinese support.
  - (February) Antiochus, the son of Antiochus III and co-regent for the Seleucid throne since 209 BC, dies; according to cuneiform tablets, news reaches Babylon sometime during the month of Addara after April 8.
  - (November) Antiochus III leads an army into Greece to challenge Roman control, at the invitation of the Aetolians, starting the Roman-Syrian War.
- 191 BC: (April 24) Battle of Thermopylae: Manius Acilius Glabrio drives Antiochus III out of Greece.
- 190 BC: (December or January 189 BC) Battle of Magnesia: Rome and Pergamon drive Antiochus III out of Asia Minor.

=== 180s BC ===
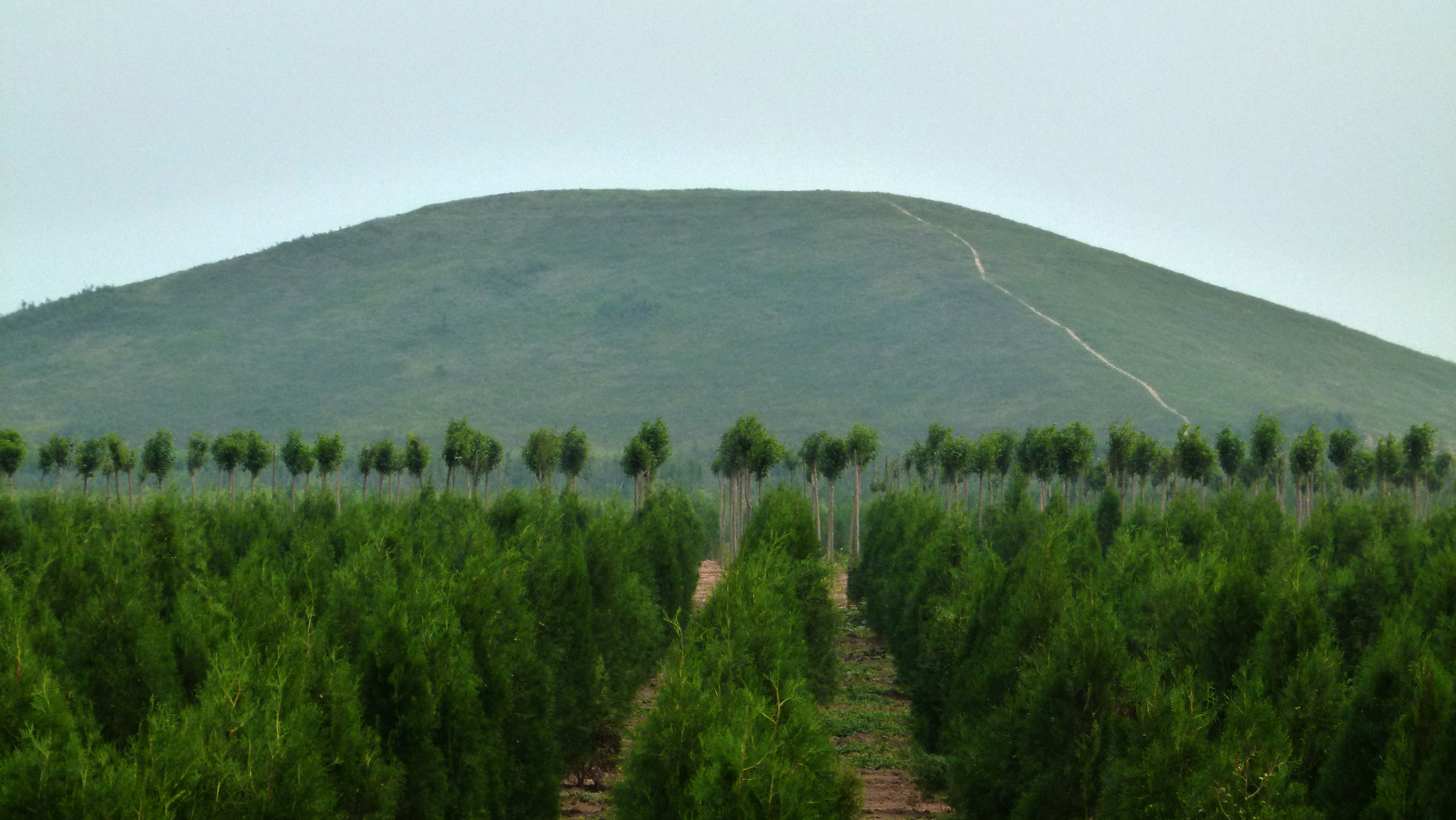
Tomb of Empress Lü in Changling, Xianyang, Shaanxi

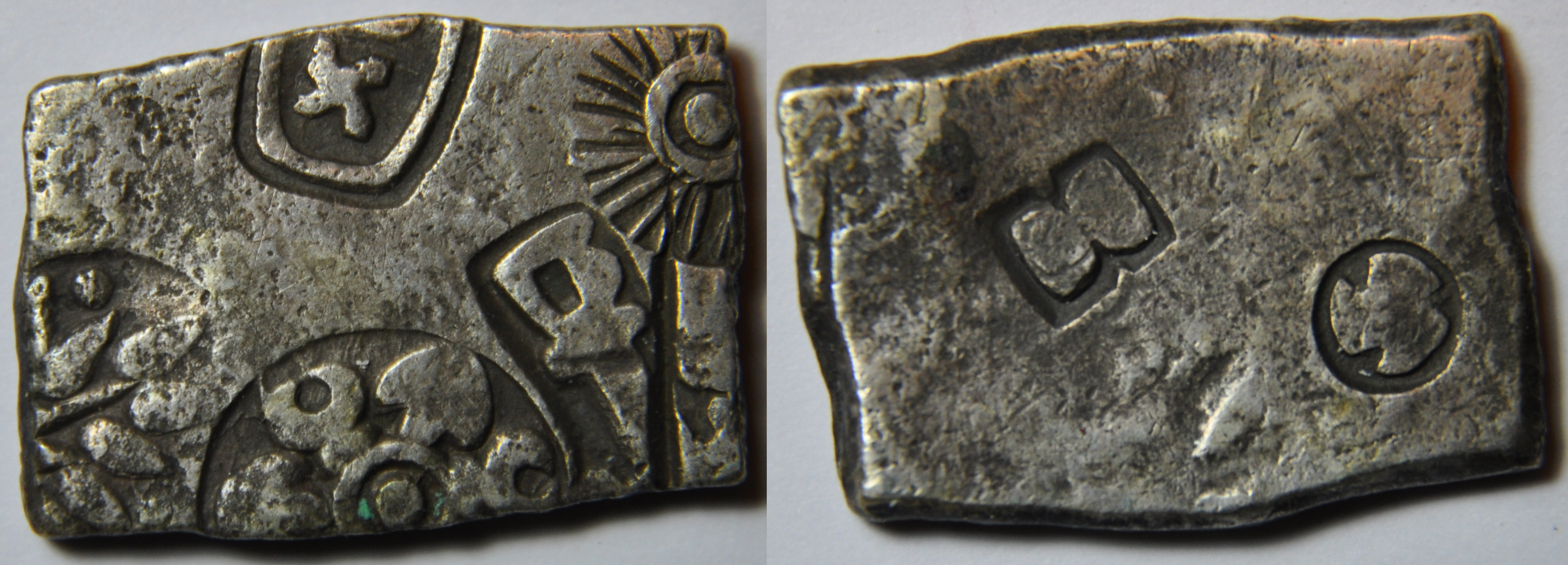
A silver coin of 1 karshapana of King Pushyamitra Shunga (185-149 BC), founder of the Shunga dynasty.

- 189 BC: Galatian War: Gnaeus Manlius Vulso and Pergamon defeat the Galatians.
- 188 BC: (September 26) Prince Liu Gong, the five-year old younger brother of Emperor Hui becomes the third Han dynasty Emperor of China upon his brother's death, taking the regnal name of Emperor Qianshao. Because of his minority, his grandmother, Empress Lü continues as the actual ruler and serves as the regent.
- 187 BC: (July 3) Seleucid king Antiochus III dies at the age of 53 and is succeeded by his son Seleucus IV Philopator.
- 186 BC: Ptolemy V defeats Ankhwennefer and regains control of Upper Egypt.
- 185 BC: Pushyamitra Shunga assassinates the last Maurya emperor, founding the Shunga dynasty.
- 184 BC: (June 15) Emperor Qianshao of Han, the 11-year old nominal ruler of China, is removed, imprisoned and then put to death on order of his grandmother, Empress Lü. Prince Liu Hong, the brother of Qianshao, is installed by the regent as the new Emperor, under the name of Emperor Houshao.
- 183 BC: Zhao Tuo of Nanyue declares himself Emperor and attacks China.
- 180 BC: (November 14) Lü Clan Disturbance: with the death of Empress Lü of China, the nominal Houshao is killed along with the rest of the Lü Clan. Another son of Gaozu, the first Han emperor, Prince Liu Heng, becomes the fifth Han emperor and takes the name of Emperor Wen.

=== 170s BC ===
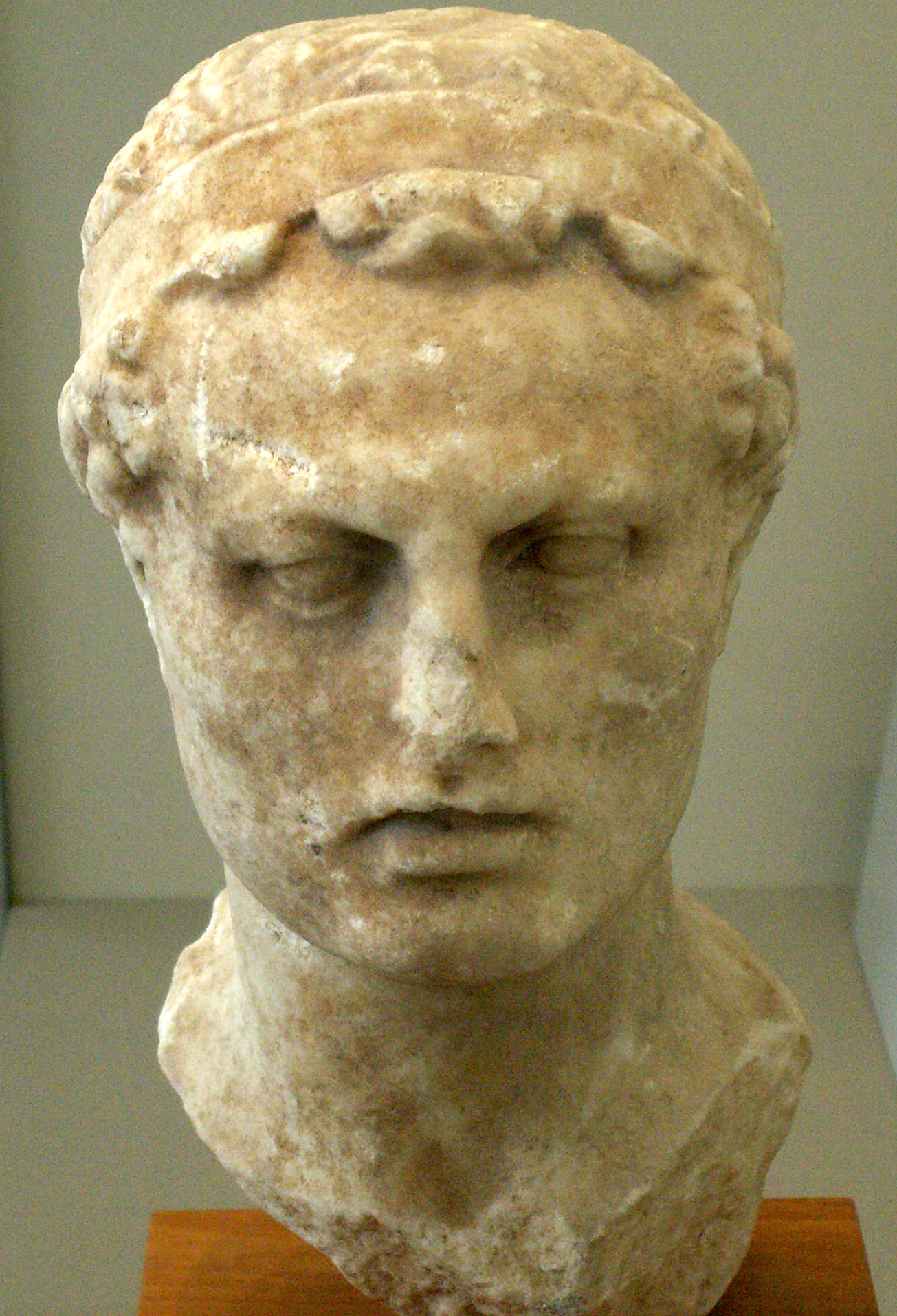
Bust of Antiochus IV at the Altes Museum in Berlin.

- 179 BC:
  - Zhao Tuo of Nanyue makes peace with Han China.
  - Upon the death of Philip V, Perseus becomes king of Antigonid Macedon.
- 178 BC: Tiberius Sempronius Gracchus ends the First Celtiberian War.
- 176 BC: The Xiongnu defeat the Yuezhi, who subsequently emigrate from Gansu to the Qilian Mountains and the Ili valley.
- 175 BC: (September 3) Upon the assassination of Seleucus IV Philopator, his brother Antiochus IV Epiphanes takes possession of the Seleucid throne.
- 171 BC: At the prompting of the Attalid king Eumenes II, the Romans declare war on Perseus, beginning the Third Macedonian War.

=== 160s BC ===
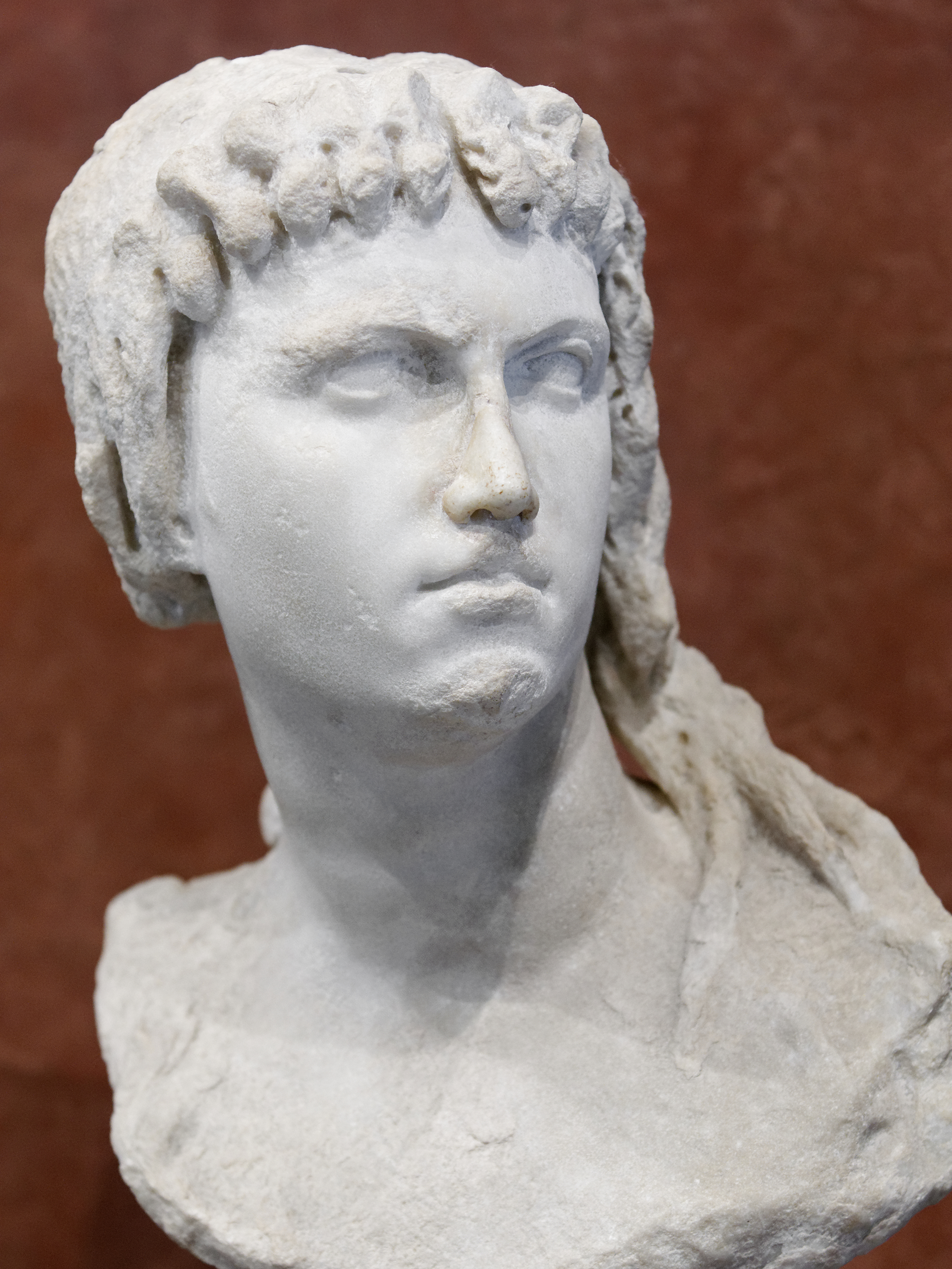
Cleopatra II ruled Egypt in co-operation and competition with her brothers Ptolemy VI and VIII for most of the century.

- 168 BC:
  - Third Macedonian War: Roman victory in the Battle of Pydna leads to the dissolution of the Antigonid Kingdom of Macedon.
  - Sixth Syrian War: Antiochus IV of the Seleucid Empire invades Ptolemaic Egypt, but is forced to turn back by Gaius Popillius Laenas at the Day of Eleusis.
- 167 BC: Mithradates I of Parthia takes Margiana and Aria from the Greco-Bactrian Kingdom.
- 164 BC
  - 25 Kislev: Judas Maccabaeus, son of Mattathias of the Hasmonean family, restores the Temple in Jerusalem (Hanukkah, Maccabean Revolt).
  - Ptolemy VIII drives his brother Ptolemy VI out of Alexandria. He flees to Rome.
  - Antiochus IV dies on campaign, leaving the Seleucid Empire to his nine-year-old son, Antiochus V.
- 163 BC:
  - (May 20) Chinese mathematicians observe and record the passage of the Halley's Comet.
  - Ptolemy VI regains Alexandria. Ptolemy VIII takes Cyrenaica.
  - Timarchus rebels against the Seleucid Empire and seizes control of Media and Babylonia.
- 161 BC:
  - Battle of Vijithapura: Dutthagamani defeats the Tamil King Ellalan.
  - Demetrius I Soter seizes the Seleucid throne, beginning a succession war that would consume the Seleucid realm for almost a century.
- 160 BC: The Wusun drive the Yuezhi out of the Ili valley.

=== 150s BC ===
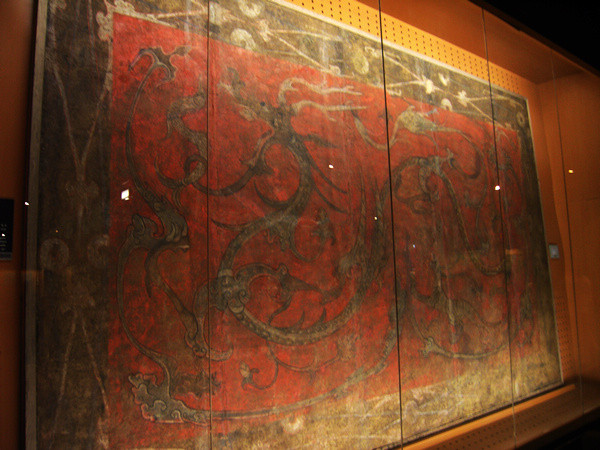
Mural from the tomb of Liu Wu whose principality was at the heart of the Rebellion of the Seven States

- 158 BC: The Xiongnu attack northern China.
- 157 BC: (July 6) Emperor Wen of Han dies and is succeeded by his son Prince Liu Qi who takes the regnal name of the Emperor Jing.
- 155 BC: The Lusitanians begin the Lusitanian War against Rome.
- 154 BC
  - The Celtiberians of Numantia begin the Numantine War against Rome.
  - Liu Pi leads the Rebellion of the Seven States against Emperor Jing of Han China and is defeated.
- 152 BC: Alexander Balas starts a revolt against Demetrius I Soter with the support of Jonathan Maccabaeus

=== 140s BC ===
- 148 BC:
  - Mithradates I of Parthia takes Ecbatana from the Seleucids.
  - Rome conquers Macedonia (Fourth Macedonian War).
- 147 BC: Hasmonean victories restore autonomy to Judea.
- 146 BC: Rome destroys and razes the city of Carthage (Third Punic War) and destroys the Achaean League and razes Corinth (Achaean War).
- 145 BC:
  - Battle of Antioch: Alexander Balas of the Seleucid Empire loses his throne and Ptolemy VI of Egypt loses his life.
  - Ptolemy VIII takes control of Alexandria.
  - Greco-Bactrian city of Ai-Khanoum is sacked (possibly by the Yuezhi).
- 141 BC (March 9): Emperor Jing of Han dies and is succeeded by his son Prince Liu Che, who is enthroned as the Emperor Wu and begins a 54-year reign. The new emperor's attempts at reform are immediately stymied by his grandmother.

=== 130s BC ===
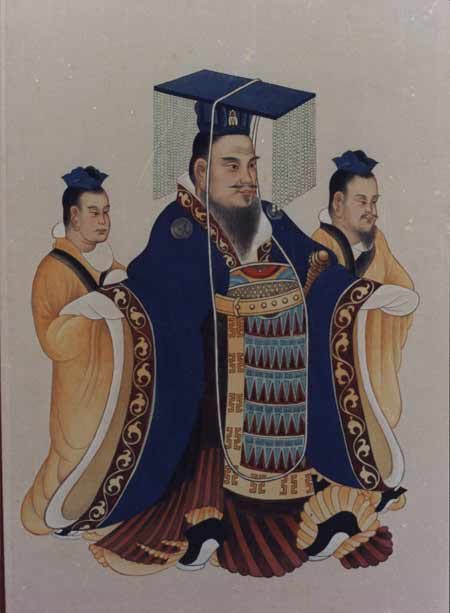
Emperor Wu of Han was probably the most powerful man in the world at the end of the century

- 139 BC:
  - The assassination of Viriathus marks the end of the Lusitanian War.
  - Mithradates I of Parthia defeats the Seleucid king Demetrius II Nicator and captures Babylonia.
- 138 BC: Minyue's invasion of Eastern Ou sparks off the Han campaigns against Minyue
- 135 BC
  - Minyue's invasion of Nanyue leads to conquest of its western half by China. The eastern half survives as Dongyue.
  - Eunus begins the First Servile War.
- 133 BC:
  - Attalus III of Pergamon dies, bequeathing his kingdom to the Roman Republic.
  - Emperor Wu sets an ambush for the Xiongnu, beginning the Han–Xiongnu War
  - Assassination of Tiberius Gracchus.
  - Scipio Aemilianus wins the Siege of Numantia and conquers the Celtiberians.
- 132 BC: Rioting on the streets of Alexandria leads to civil war between Ptolemy VIII and Cleopatra II.
- 130 BC:
  - Greek astronomer Hipparchus continues lifelong studies, becoming the first to calculate the precession of moon and sun and to create a sizable catalog of stars.
  - Heliocles I, the last Greek king of Bactria, dies.

=== 120s BC ===
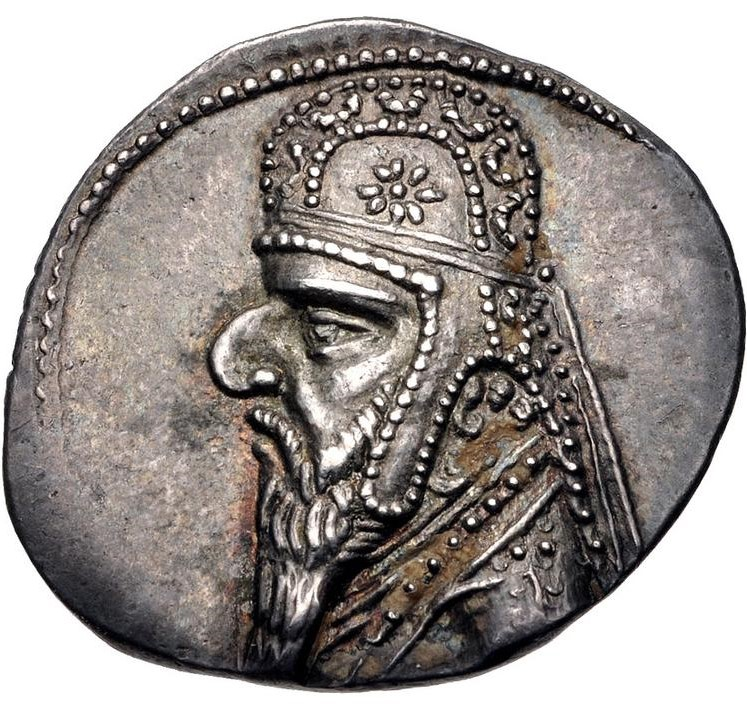
Drachm of Mithridates II of Parthia, wearing a bejeweled tiara.

- 129 BC: Battle of Ecbatana: Antiochus VII Sidetes of the Seleucid empire attempt to reclaim the Iranian Plateau from Parthia ends in failure.
- 127 BC: Hyspaosines of Characene takes control of Babylonia.
- 126 BC: Ptolemy VIII regains control of Alexandria.
- 125 BC: Zhang Qian returns to China after a protracted journey through the west.
- 124 BC: Artabanus II of Parthia is killed in battle with the Yuezhi and succeeded by his son Mithridates II
- 122 BC: Mithradates II of Parthia regains control of Babylonia and Characene
- 121 BC: Assassination of Gaius Gracchus

=== 110s BC ===
- 116 BC: (June 28) Ptolemy VIII of Egypt dies and is succeeded by his wife Cleopatra III and son Ptolemy IX Soter.
- 113 BC: The Cimbri and Teutones arrive on the banks of the Danube in Noricum, clashing with Roman allies, beginning the Cimbrian War.
- 112 BC: Jugurtha of Numidia's elimination of his co-regents sparks the Jugurthine War with Rome.
- 111 BC: A power struggle in Nam Viet leads to its conquest by China, ending the Triệu dynasty and beginning the First Chinese domination of Vietnam.

=== 100s BC ===
- 109 BC: China conquers Dian.
- 109 BC: King Ugeo of Gojoseon kills a Chinese envoy, sparking the Gojoseon–Han War.
- 108 BC: Chinese troops destroy Wanggeom seong, capital of Wiman Joseon, establishing the Four Commanderies of Han to govern the northern part of Korea.
- 107 BC: Gaius Marius attains his first consulship.
- 106 BC: Gaius Marius and Sulla bring an end to the Jugurthine War.
- 105 BC: Battle of Arausio: Cimbri and Teutones annihilate a Roman army.
- 104 – 101 BC: War of the Heavenly Horses, China defeats Dayuan at great cost.
- 104 BC: A mass-manumission leads to the Second Servile War in Sicily
- 102 BC: Gaius Marius defeats the Teutones at the Battle of Aquae Sextiae
- 101 BC: Gaius Marius defeats the Cimbri at the Battle of Vercellae, ending the Cimbrian War.

== Significant people ==
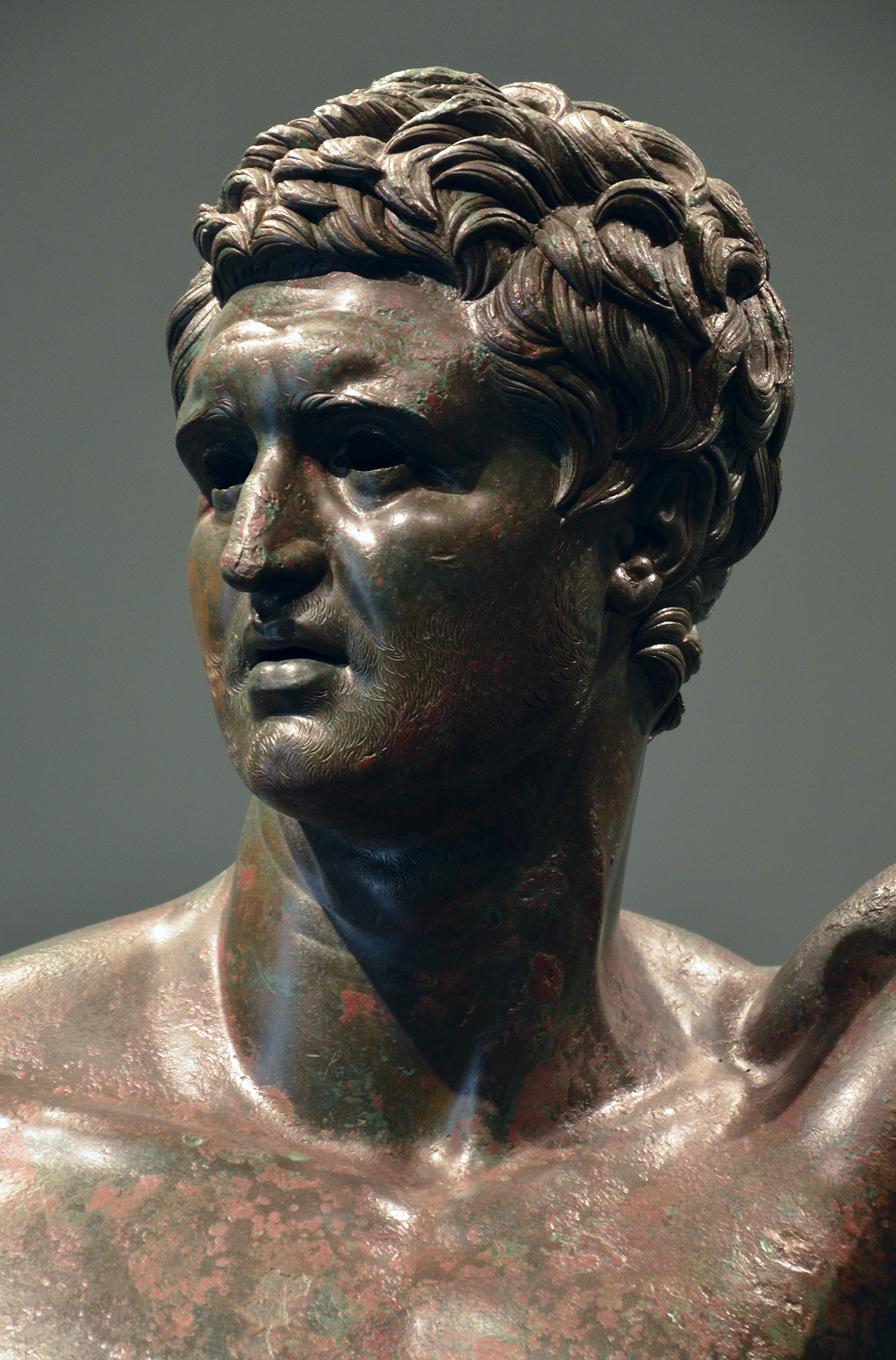
Scipio Aemilianus

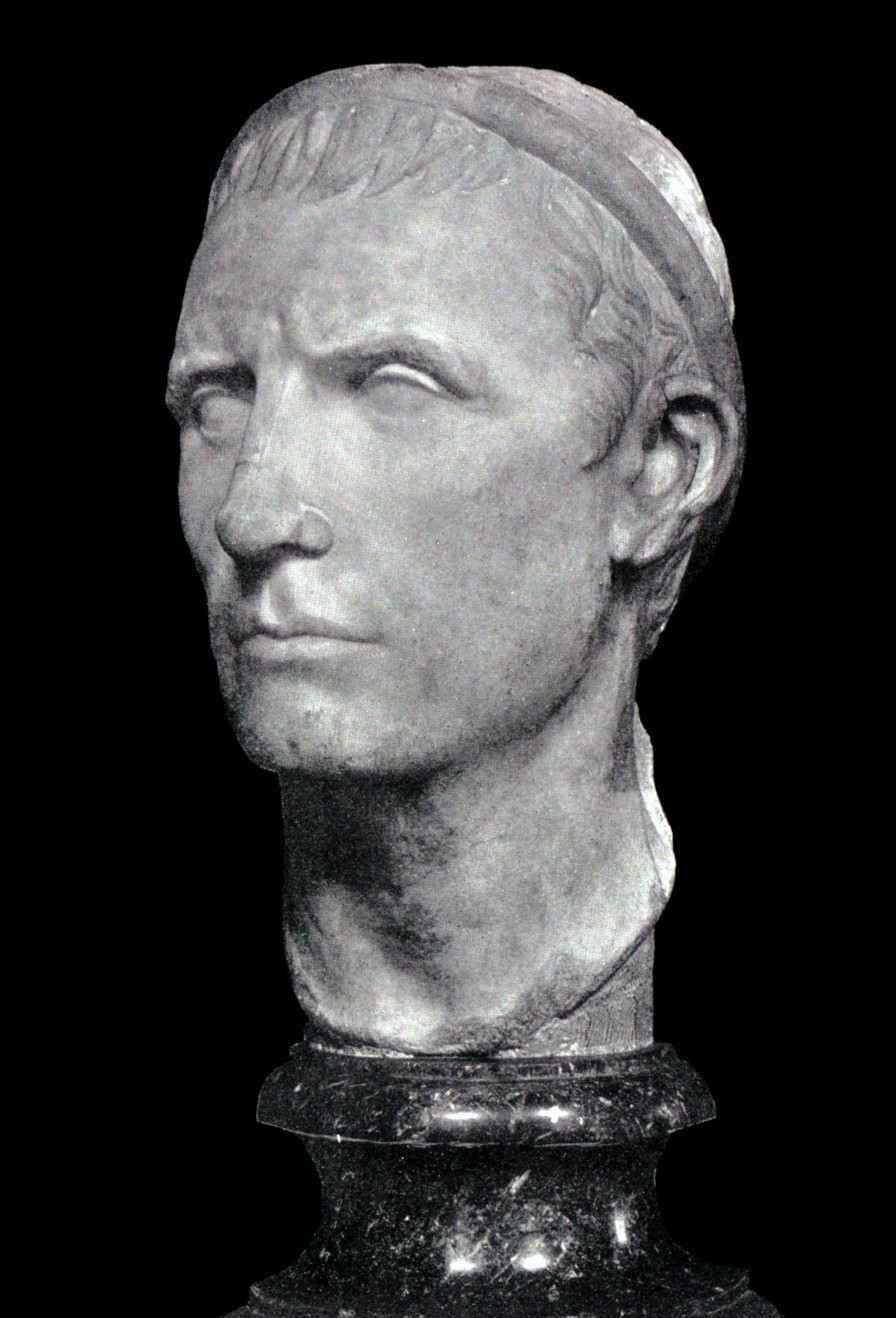
Antiochus the Great

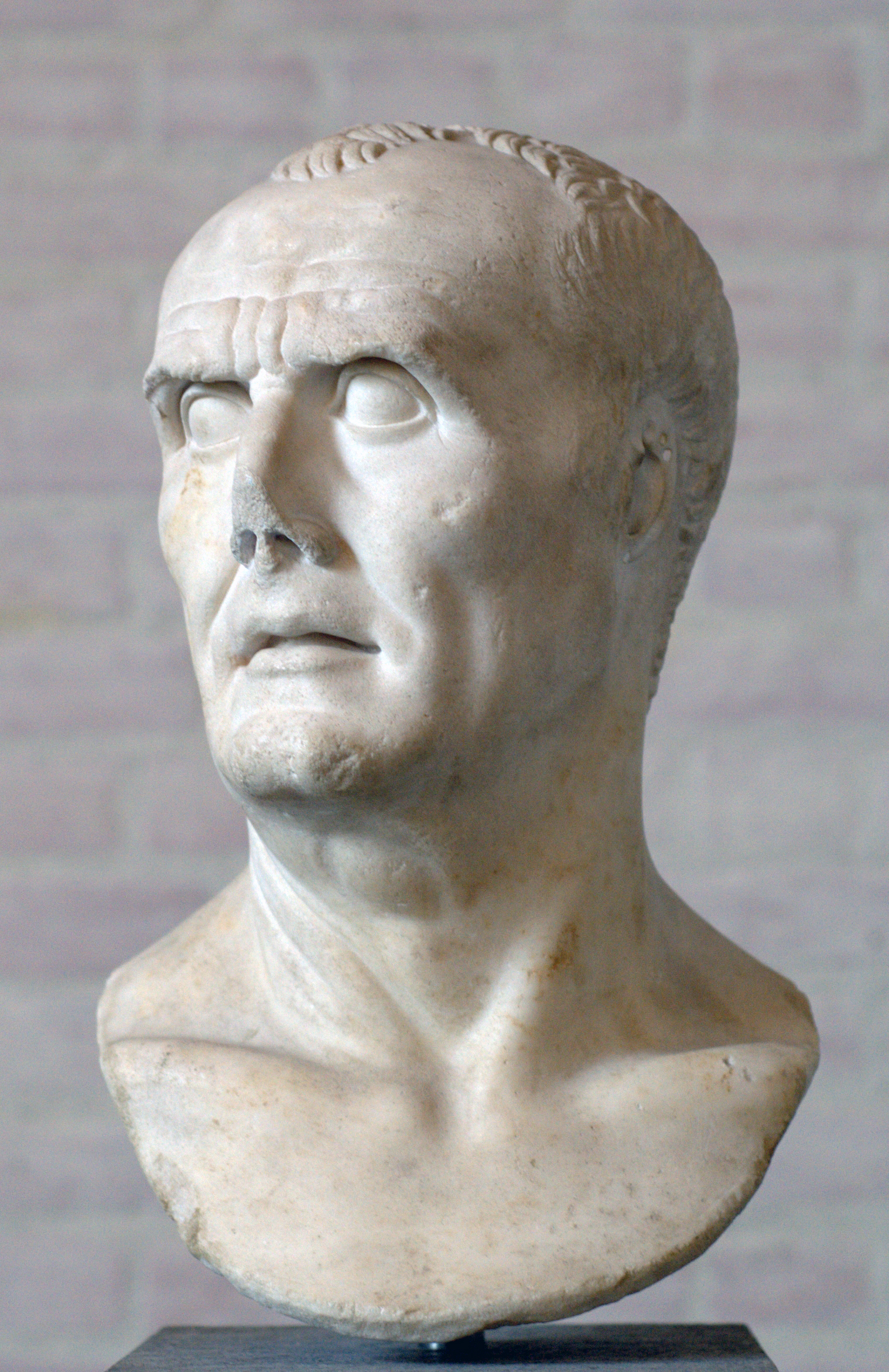
A bust purported to be of Gaius Marius

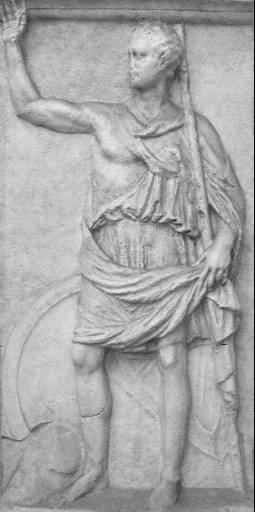
Polybius

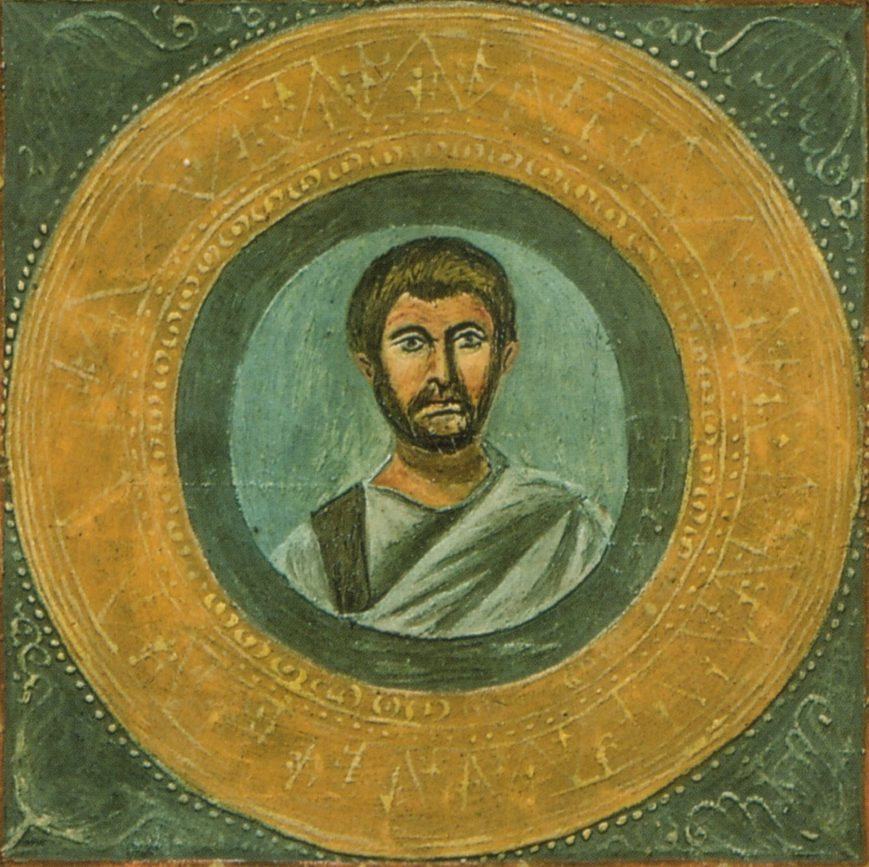
Terence

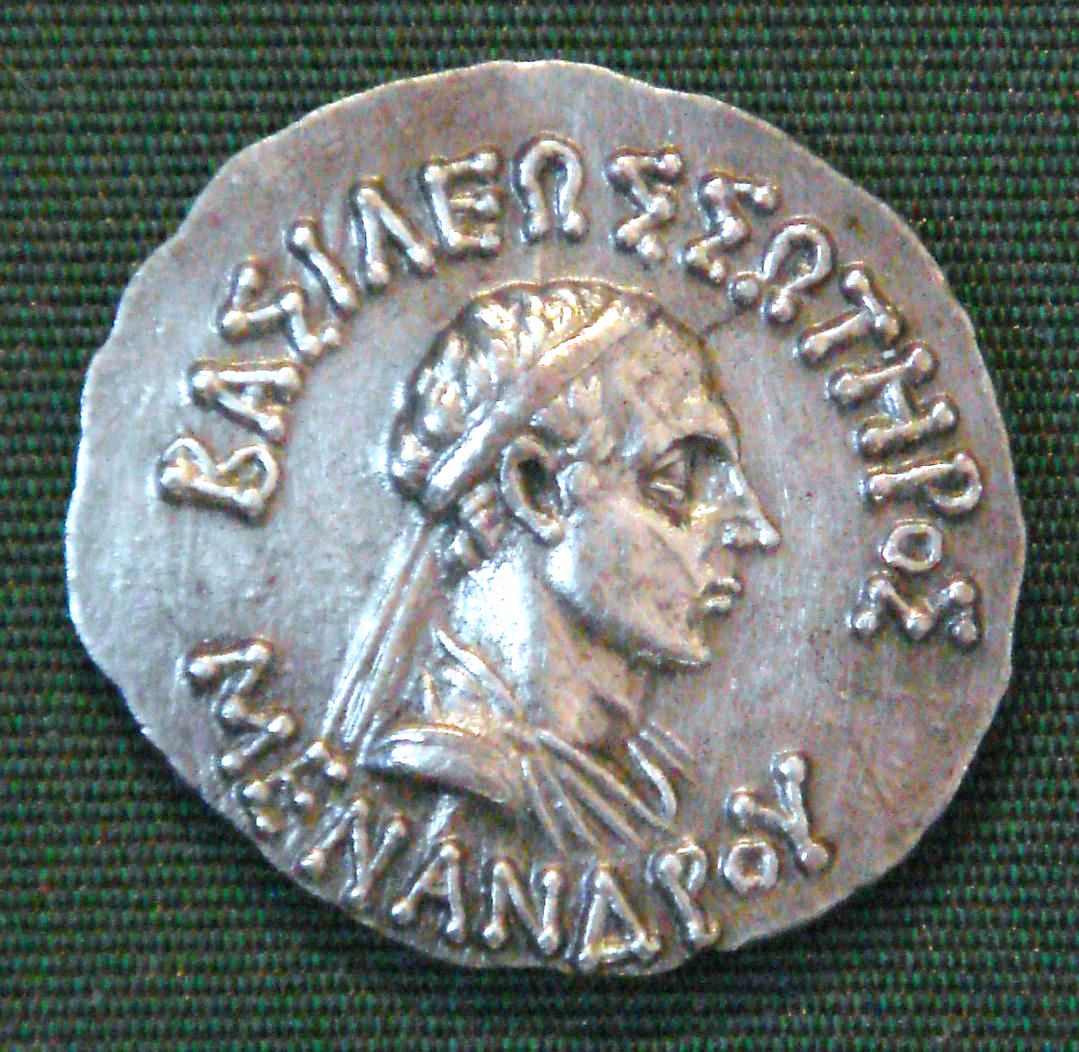
Coin of Menander I, the Greek king who ruled most of Northern India (c. 150-130) and converted to Buddhism.

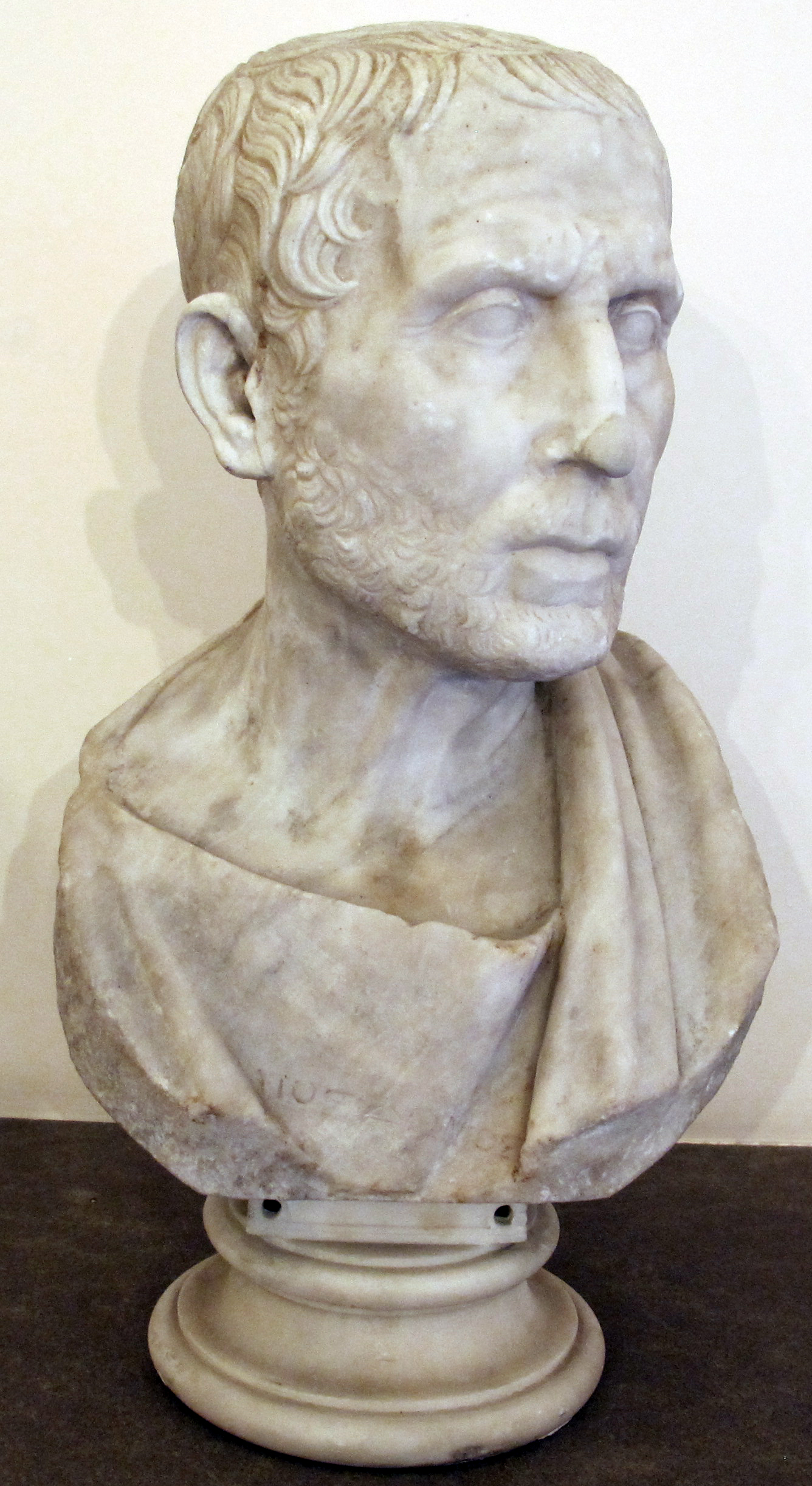
Posidonius was acclaimed as the greatest polymath of his age.

=== Politics ===
- Andriscus, last independent ruler of Macedon
- Antiochus IV Epiphanes, the last effective ruler of the Seleucid Empire
- Antiochus VII Sidetes, last King of a United Seleucid Empire
- Eucratides I Megas, the most powerful Greco-Bactrian king
- Mithridates I, great king of the Parthian Empire
- Appius Claudius Pulcher (consul 143 BC), Roman consul and censor
- Boiorix, king of the Cimbri
- Cato the Elder, Roman politician, writer and historian
- Gaius Gracchus, Roman politician
- Gaius Marius, Roman general and politician
- Jonathan Maccabaeus, leader of the Hasmonean rebellion and first autonomous ruler of Judea
- Lucius Aemilius Paullus Macedonicus, Roman general and politician
- Lucius Cornelius Sulla, Roman general and politician
- Lucius Mummius Achaicus, conqueror of Corinth
- Marcus Claudius Marcellus (consul 166 BC), Roman politician
- Perseus of Macedon, last King of the Antigonid dynasty
- Publius Mucius Scaevola (triumphator), Roman politician
- Publius Mucius Scaevola (pontifex maximus), Roman politician
- Quintus Caecilius Metellus Macedonicus, Roman general and politician
- Quintus Caecilius Metellus Numidicus, Roman general and politician
- Teutobod, King of the Teutons
- Tiberius Gracchus Roman politician and statesman
- Emperor Wu of Han (漢武帝,劉徹), seventh Han dynasty emperor, who consolidated and expanded imperial power in China
- Zhang Qian (張騫), Chinese diplomat and explorer
- Zhao Tuo, Chinese military commander who founded the Trieu dynasty

=== Military ===
- Huo Qubing, Chinese general
- Judas Maccabeus, leader of the Hasmonean rebellion and its first successful general
- Li Guang, Chinese general
- Lucius Caecilius Metellus Calvus, Roman general
- Lucius Caecilius Metellus Dalmaticus, Roman general
- Quintus Lutatius Catulus, Roman general
- Scipio Aemilianus Africanus, Roman general that conquered Carthage
- Wei Qing, Chinese general

=== Literature ===
- Apollodorus of Athens, Greek writer, grammarian, and historian
- Bion of Smyrna, Greek poet
- Gaius Lucilius, Roman satirist
- Lutatius Catulus, Roman poet, orator and historian
- Lucius Accius, Roman poet
- Moschus, Greek poet
- Pacuvius, Roman poet
- Quintus Ennius, Roman poet
- Sima Xiangru (司馬相如), Chinese musician, poet and writer
- Titus Maccius Plautus, Roman playwright
- Terence, Roman playwright
- Sangam literature, corpus of ancient Tamil literature
- Kaniyan Pungundranar, one of the poets of the Tamil Sangam work Purananuru

=== Science and philosophy ===
- Apollonius of Perga, Greek geometer
- Carneades, Greek philosopher
- Crates of Mallus, Greek grammarian and philosopher
- Diogenes of Babylon, Greek philosopher
- Eight Immortals of Huainan (淮南八仙), Chinese philosophers
- Hipparchus, Greek astronomer
- Hypsicles, Greek mathematician and astronomer
- Liu An (劉安), Chinese geographer
- Panaetius, Greek philosopher
- Polybius, Greek historian
- Posidonius, Greek philosopher, geographer, astronomer and historian
- Seleucus of Seleucia, Hellenistic astronomer
- Sima Qian (司馬遷), Chinese historian
- Zenodorus, Greek mathematician

== Inventions, discoveries, introductions ==
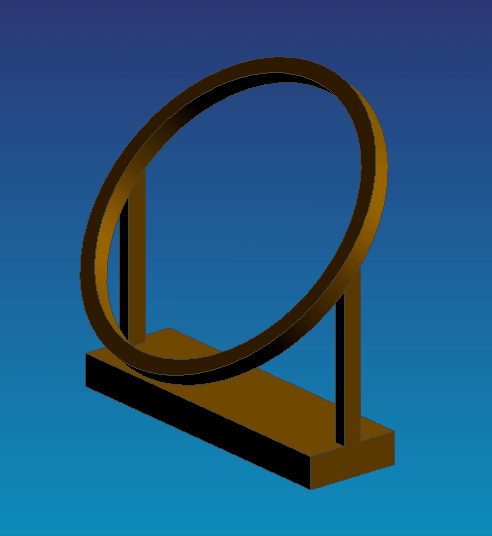
Hipparchus' equatorial ring.

- The Chinese first produce paper.
- Silk Road between Europe and Asia.
- Hipparchus discovers precession of Earth's equinoxes and compiles first trigonometric tables.
- According to legend, Liu An invents tofu.
- The Fibonacci numbers and their sequence first appear in Indian mathematics as mātrāmeru, mentioned by Pingala in connection with the Sanskrit tradition of prosody.
- Pingala was the first who accidentally discovered binary numbers in which he used laghu(light) and guru(heavy) rather than 0 and 1.
- Tube drawn technology: Indians used tube drawn technology for glass bead manufacturing which was first developed in the 2nd century BC
- The Roman concrete (pozzolana) first used.
- A system for sending signs to communicate quickly over a long distance is described by Polybius.
- The earliest known winnowing machine is depicted in a Han dynasty Chinese tomb model.

== See also ==
- List of sovereign states in the 2nd century BC.
