= 161 BC =

161 BC in various calendars
- Gregorian calendar: 161 BC; CLXI BC
- Ab urbe condita: 593
- Ancient Egypt era: XXXIII dynasty, 163
- Pharaoh: Ptolemy VI Philometor, 20
- Ancient Greek Olympiad (summer): 154th Olympiad, year 4
- Assyrian calendar: 4590
- Balinese saka calendar: N/A
- Bengali calendar: −754 – −753
- Berber calendar: 790
- Buddhist calendar: 384
- Burmese calendar: −798
- Byzantine calendar: 5348–5349
- Chinese calendar: 己卯年 (Earth Rabbit); 2537 or 2330 — to — 庚辰年 (Metal Dragon); 2538 or 2331
- Coptic calendar: −444 – −443
- Discordian calendar: 1006
- Ethiopian calendar: −168 – −167
- Hebrew calendar: 3600–3601
- Hindu calendars
- Vikram Samvat: −104 – −103
- Shaka Samvat: N/A
- Kali Yuga: 2940–2941
- Holocene calendar: 9840
- Iranian calendar: 782 BP – 781 BP
- Islamic calendar: 806 BH – 805 BH
- Javanese calendar: N/A
- Julian calendar: N/A
- Korean calendar: 2173
- Minguo calendar: 2072 before ROC 民前2072年
- Nanakshahi calendar: −1628
- Seleucid era: 151/152 AG
- Thai solar calendar: 382–383
- Tibetan calendar: ས་མོ་ཡོས་ལོ་ (female Earth-Hare) −34 or −415 or −1187 — to — ལྕགས་ཕོ་འབྲུག་ལོ་ (male Iron-Dragon) −33 or −414 or −1186

The Year 161 BC was a year of the pre-Julian Roman calendar. At the time, it was known as the Year of the Consulship of Messalla and Strabo (or, less frequently, year 593 Ab urbe condita) and the Third Year of Houyuan. The denomination 161 BC for this year has been used since the early medieval period, when the Anno Domini calendar era became the prevalent method in Europe for naming years.

== Events ==
=== by side ===
==== Seleucid Empire ====
- The rebel Seleucid general and ruler of Media, Timarchus, who has distinguished himself by defending Media against the emergent Parthians, treats Demetrius I's violent accession to the Seleucid throne as the excuse to declare himself an independent king and extend his realm from Media into Babylonia.
- With the restoration of peace in Judea, an internal struggle breaks out between the supporters of Judas Maccabeus and the Hellenic party. The influence of the Hellenic Party all but collapses in the wake of the Seleucid defeat.
- The Jewish High Priest Menelaus, who is supported by the Hellenist party, is removed from office and is executed. His successor is a moderate member of the Hellenic party, Alcimus. However, when Alcimus executes sixty Jews who are opposed to him, he finds himself in open conflict with the Maccabees. Alcimus flees from Jerusalem and goes to Damascus to ask the Seleucid king, Demetrius I, for help.
- The Maccabees, led by Judas Maccabeus, and a Seleucid army, led by the Seleucid general Nicanor, fight the Battle of Adasa, near Beth-horon. Maccabeus wins the battle and Nicanor is killed.

==== Egypt ====
- Ptolemy VIII Euergetes, now king of Cyrenaica, convinces the Roman Senate to back his claim for control of Cyprus, but the Egyptian king Ptolemy VI Philometor ignores this threat, and after Ptolemy VIII Euergetes' attempt to conquer the island fails, the Roman Senate disengages from the dispute.

==== Roman Republic ====
- The Roman playwright Terence's plays Eunuchus (The Eunuch) and Phormio are first performed.
- Envoys of Judas Maccabeus conclude a treaty of friendship with the Roman Senate.
- Marcus Pomponius, praetor in 161 BC, obtains a decree of the senate, forbidding philosophers and rhetoricians from living in Rome.

== Births ==
- Cleopatra III, queen of Egypt from 142 BC (d. 101 BC)
- Demetrius II Nicator, king of the Seleucid Empire from 145 BC and 129 BC (d. 125 BC)

== Deaths ==
- Nicanor, Seleucid general
