= Mirian I =

King of Iberia
- Reign: 162 BC – 112 BC or 159 BC – 109 BC
- Predecessor: Sauromaces I
- Successor: Pharnajom
- Died: 112 BC or 109 BC
- Issue: Pharnajom
- Dynasty: Pharnavazids
- Religion: Georgian paganism

Mirian I (Georgian: მირიან I) was a king (mepe) of Iberia who reigned in the 2nd century BC. An adopted son of his father-in-law King Sauromaces I, he was a Persian-born prince but governed over Iberia as a member of the Pharnavazid dynasty.

His reign coincided with the emergence of large geopolitical changes associated with the slow collapse of the Seleucid Empire and the rise of Parthia, as well as the increasing power of the neighboring Kingdom of Armenia. While he faced a violent North Caucasian invasion, he repelled it successfully and fortified the Dariali Pass, which would remain Georgia's first line of northern defense until the 19th century.

== Life ==
=== Origins ===
The medieval Georgian Chronicles, telling the history of the ancient Kingdom of Iberia, remains vague on the origins of Mirian. In the book, he is named a "Nebrotid" along with his descendants, an indication of his Persian origin as "Nebrot" was the Georgian name for Biblical figure Nimrod, the mythical ancestor of Persians. While the identity of his father is unknown, his mother was said to be a maternal aunt of the wife of King Sauromaces I of Iberia and a sister of the Persian governor of Azerbaijan.

Vakhushti of Kartli and Marie-Félicité Brosset talk of Mirian I as the founder of the Nebrotid dynasty of Iberia. However, Cyril Toumanoff believed that the king was born into the Orontid royal dynasty of Armenia (though the latter disappeared around 200 BC), or even a Persian Mihranid (and so even though the Mihranids only appeared in history in the 4th century). Most likely, Mirian I was a Persian noble, his name coming from the Middle Persian mihrbān ("friendly, good") and the Old Persian "Miθrāpāna" ("under the protection of Mithra").

=== Heir to the throne ===
King Sauromaces I had Mirian sent to Iberia as he had no male heir and was seeking a successor. He offered him his oldest daughter to wed, as well as the provinces of Gachiani and Samshvilde, the southern marches of the kingdom, with the title of eristavi ("royal governor"). He would eventually formally be appointed as heir to the throne by Sauromaces I, making his reign a continuation of the Pharnavazid dynasty.

=== Reign ===
==== North Caucasian invasion ====
In 162 BC (or 159 BC according to Cyril Toumanoff), King Sauromaces I died after a long reign of 75 years. Mirian acceded the throne, becoming the third King of Iberia, his capital being Mtskheta. He ruled at a time of tense geopolitical crises: at his southern border, Artaxiad Armenia at an increasing ambition that threatened the southern territories of Iberia, while Hellen Seleucids and Parthian Arsacids were at war over the control of the Near East.

The largest conflict came, however, at the north of Iberia, where several mountainous tribes maintained an unstable relationship with Iberia. At an unknown date, the Dzurdzuk tribe, historical allies of Iberia, invaded the provinces of Kakheti and Bazaleti, in the north of the kingdom. Along with several other North Caucasian tribes and the Chartaletian clan, which had been settled in Iberia by King Sauromaces I, the Dzurdzuks ravaged the country and captured many Iberians as hostages. King Mirian I summoned the governors of the eight royal provinces of the kingdom, as well as the pro-Iberian Dzurdzuk contingent in Svaneti to repel the invasion.

Mirian and his troops managed to first free to lands occupied by the North Caucasians, before chasing down the Dzurdzuks. The decisive battle took place in the Dariali Gorge, where Iberian forces afoot, led by the king himself, won a bloody victory over the invaders. Continuing his campaign, King Mirian pursued the North Caucasians and ravaged the Dzurdzuk and Chartaletian lands.

Following this invasion, Mirian I had a series of fortifications built in the gorge, known as the Dariali Pass. Till the 19th century, these fortifications would be used as the first line of defense against North Caucasian raids.

==== Shift in foreign policy ====
Unlike his predecessors, King Mirian became a vassal of Parthia, while seeking to keep close ties with the Seleucid Empire, notably my marrying his daughter to wed the Armenian Prince Artaxias, son of the pro-Seleucid king Artavasdes I. These alliances, however, could not prevent the rise of the Kingdom of Pontus, whose ruler King Mithridates VI Eupator acceded the throne in 120 BC and began a progressive annexation of Colchis.

The Persian origins of Mirian I may be behind the fact that he has been depicted as a Zoroastrian. He dispatched several religious representatives across Iberia, but had to face a large opposition and several bloody revolts. In 112 BC (or 109 BC), King Mirian I died and left his throne to his son Pharnajom.

== Family ==
King Mirian I had at least two children from an unknown wife:

- Pharnajom, King of Iberia
- a daughter, wife of King Artaxias I.

== Bibliography ==
- Brosset, Marie-Félicité (1849). Histoire de la Géorgie depuis l'Antiquité jusqu'au XIXe siècle. Volume I [History of Georgia from Ancient Times to the 19th Century, Volume 1] (in French). Saint-Petersburg: Imperial Academy of Sciences.
- Toumanoff, Cyril (1969). Chronology of the early Kings of Iberia. Traditio.
- Rayfield, Donald (2012). Edge of Empires, a History of Georgia. London: Reaktion Books. ISBN 978-1-78023-070-2.
- Allen, W.E.D. (1932). A History of the Georgian People. London: Routledge & Keagan Paul.
- Olbrycht, Marek Jan (2009). "Mithridates VI Eupator and Iran". In Højte, Jakob Munk (ed.). Mithridates VI and the Pontic Kingdom. Black Sea Studies. Vol. 9. Aarhus University Press. pp. 163–190. ISBN 978-8779344433. ISSN 1903-4873.
- Rapp, Stephen H. (2003). Studies in Medieval Georgian Historiography: Early Texts and Eurasian Contexts. Peeters. ISBN 978-2-87723-723-9.
- Rapp, Stephen H. (2009). "The Iranian Heritage of Georgia (2009)". Iranica Antiqua. XLIV. Russian State Humanities University: 645–692. doi:10.2143/IA.44.0.2034389.
- Rapp, Stephen H. (2014). The Sasanian World through Georgian Eyes: Caucasia and the Iranian Commonwealth in Late Antique Georgian Literature. Ashgate Publishing, Ltd. ISBN 978-1472425522.

Preceded by Saurmag	King of Iberia; 159–109 BC	Succeeded by Pharnajom
