= 162 BC =

162 BC in various calendars
- Gregorian calendar: 162 BC; CLXII BC
- Ab urbe condita: 592
- Ancient Egypt era: XXXIII dynasty, 162
- Pharaoh: Ptolemy VI Philometor, 19
- Ancient Greek Olympiad (summer): 154th Olympiad, year 3
- Assyrian calendar: 4589
- Balinese saka calendar: N/A
- Bengali calendar: −755 – −754
- Berber calendar: 789
- Buddhist calendar: 383
- Burmese calendar: −799
- Byzantine calendar: 5347–5348
- Chinese calendar: 戊寅年 (Earth Tiger); 2536 or 2329 — to — 己卯年 (Earth Rabbit); 2537 or 2330
- Coptic calendar: −445 – −444
- Discordian calendar: 1005
- Ethiopian calendar: −169 – −168
- Hebrew calendar: 3599–3600
- Hindu calendars
- Vikram Samvat: −105 – −104
- Shaka Samvat: N/A
- Kali Yuga: 2939–2940
- Holocene calendar: 9839
- Iranian calendar: 783 BP – 782 BP
- Islamic calendar: 807 BH – 806 BH
- Javanese calendar: N/A
- Julian calendar: N/A
- Korean calendar: 2172
- Minguo calendar: 2073 before ROC 民前2073年
- Nanakshahi calendar: −1629
- Seleucid era: 150/151 AG
- Thai solar calendar: 381–382
- Tibetan calendar: ས་ཕོ་སྟག་ལོ་ (male Earth-Tiger) −35 or −416 or −1188 — to — ས་མོ་ཡོས་ལོ་ (female Earth-Hare) −34 or −415 or −1187

Year 162 BC was a year of the pre-Julian Roman calendar. At the time it was known as the Year of the Consulship of Corculum/Lentulus and Figulus/Ahenobarbus (or, less frequently, year 592 Ab urbe condita) and the Second Year of Houyuan. The denomination 162 BC for this year has been used since the early medieval period, when the Anno Domini calendar era became the prevalent method in Europe for naming years.

== Events ==
=== By place ===
==== Seleucid Empire ====
- The Maccabees, under the leadership of Judas Maccabeus, continue their struggle against the Seleucids and persecute the Hellenising faction in Judea.
- Seleucid forces still control the Acra, a strong fortress within Jerusalem that faces the Temple Mount. Judas Maccabeus lays siege to the fortress and in response, the Seleucid general and regent to the young Seleucid king Antiochus V, Lysias, approaches Jerusalem and besieges Beth-zechariah, 25 kilometres from the city. Judas lifts his own siege on the Acra, and leads his army south to Beth-zechariah. In the ensuing Battle of Beth-zechariah, the Seleucids achieve their first major victory over the Maccabees, and Judas is forced to withdraw to Jerusalem.
- Lysias then lays siege to the city. Just when capitulation by the Maccabees seems imminent, Lysias has to withdraw when the commander-in-chief under the late Seleucid king Antiochus IV Epiphanes, Philip, rebels against him. As a result, Lysias decides to propose a peaceful settlement which is accepted by the Maccabees. The terms of peace involve the restoration of religious freedom, permission for the Jews to live in accordance with their own laws, and the official return of the Temple in Jerusalem to the Jews.
- With the aid of the Greek statesman and historian Polybius, the son of the former Seleucid king Seleucus IV Philopator, Demetrius escapes from Rome, where he has been held as a hostage for many years, and returns to Syria to claim the throne from his cousin Antiochus V. In the resulting dispute, Antiochus V and his regent, Lysias, are overthrown and put to death. Demetrius then establishes himself on the Seleucid throne.

==== Georgia ====
- The king of Caucasian Iberia, Saurmag I, dies. Having no son, he is succeeded by his son-in-law, Mirian.

== Deaths ==
- Antiochus V Eupator, ruler of the Seleucid Empire, who has reigned since 164 BC (b. c. 173 BC)
- Lysias or Lusias, Seleucid general and governor of Syria and regent for Antiochus V Eupator
- Saurmag I, king of Caucasian Iberia
- Gnaeus Octavius, Roman statesman and general
