= Revolt of Iberian nobles =

3rd-century BCE Iberian nobles revolt against Saurmag

Date	3rd century BCE
Location	Iberia
Result	Pro-Saurmag regime victory: Revolt was suppressed with the help of Durdzuks; Saurmag created a new class of nobles directly dependent on the crown

Belligerents
Nobles of Iberia	Kingdom of Iberia; Durdzuk confederation

Commanders and leaders
Unknown	Saurmag I

Casualties and losses
Heavy	Unknown

Revolt of Iberian nobles was a revolt against Saurmag I that took place in Iberia during 3rd century BCE.

== Revolt ==
The nobles of Iberia united to kill Saurmag I. Learning of the plot, Saurmag took refuge in the land of Durdzuks (ancestors of modern-day Nakh Peoples), a country of his mother’s origin. With the Durdzuk help, Saurmag suppressed the revolt, and went on to create a new class of nobles directly dependent on the crown.

== Bibliography ==
- Мровели, Леонти (1979). Мамулиа, Г. С. (ed.). Жизнь картлийских царей. Извлечение сведений об абхазах, народах Северного Кавказа и Дагестана [Life of Kartvelian kings. Extraction of information about the Abkhazians, the peoples of the North Caucasus and Dagestan] (in Russian). Москва: Наука. pp. 1–106.
- Brosset, Marie Félicité (1849). Histoire de la Géorgie depuis l'antiquité jusqu'au XIXe siècle, traduite di Géorgien par [Originaltit.:] Kharthlis chowreba: I [History of Georgia from antiquity to the 19th century, translated from Georgian by [Originaltit.:] Kharthlis chowreba: I] (in French). S.-Péterbourg: l'acad. impér. des sciences. pp. 1–694.
- Anchabadze, George (2001). Vainakhs (The Chechen and Ingush). Tbilisi: Caucasian House. pp. 1–76.
- Rapp, Stephen H. (2003). Studies in Medieval Georgian Historiography: Early Texts and Eurasian Contexts. Peeters Publishers. pp. 1–522. ISBN 9789042913189. ISSN 0070-0444.
