= Ainina and Danina =

Goddesses in Georgian mythology

Ainina and Danina (Georgian: აინინა და დანინა) or Ainina and Danana (აჲნინა და დანანა) are a pair of pre-Christian female deities worshipped in ancient Kartli — Iberia of the Classical sources — as claimed by the medieval Georgian chronicles. Beyond these later records no evidence is available for the existence of these cults.

According to the 11th-century History of the Kings and Patriarchs, part of the compiled Georgian Chronicles, the idols of Ainina and Danana were erected by Saurmag, the second king of Kartli, on the road to the royal city of Mtskheta. The earlier, 7th–9th-century source Conversion of Kartli, reports Saurmag was responsible for establishing the cult of Ainina, while his son-in-law and successor Mirvan created the idol of Danina. The reigns of Saurmag and Mirvan are, retrospectively, placed in the 3rd and 2nd centuries BC.

Modern historians presume Ainina and Danina/Aynina and Danana are a corruption of the two names of one and the same deity, Danina/Danana being formed of the Georgian conjunctive particle da + Nana. Nicholas Marr saw in the Georgian names the reflection of the Iranian Anahita and non-Iranian Nan-As, while Michael Tseretheli believed they were influenced by the Sumerian Inanna, a counterpart of the Akkadian Ishtar.
