= 173 BC =

173 BC in various calendars
- Gregorian calendar: 173 BC; CLXXIII BC
- Ab urbe condita: 581
- Ancient Egypt era: XXXIII dynasty, 151
- Pharaoh: Ptolemy VI Philometor, 8
- Ancient Greek Olympiad (summer): 151st Olympiad, year 4
- Assyrian calendar: 4578
- Balinese saka calendar: N/A
- Bengali calendar: −766 – −765
- Berber calendar: 778
- Buddhist calendar: 372
- Burmese calendar: −810
- Byzantine calendar: 5336–5337
- Chinese calendar: 丁卯年 (Fire Rabbit); 2525 or 2318 — to — 戊辰年 (Earth Dragon); 2526 or 2319
- Coptic calendar: −456 – −455
- Discordian calendar: 994
- Ethiopian calendar: −180 – −179
- Hebrew calendar: 3588–3589
- Hindu calendars
- Vikram Samvat: −116 – −115
- Shaka Samvat: N/A
- Kali Yuga: 2928–2929
- Holocene calendar: 9828
- Iranian calendar: 794 BP – 793 BP
- Islamic calendar: 818 BH – 817 BH
- Javanese calendar: N/A
- Julian calendar: N/A
- Korean calendar: 2161
- Minguo calendar: 2084 before ROC 民前2084年
- Nanakshahi calendar: −1640
- Seleucid era: 139/140 AG
- Thai solar calendar: 370–371
- Tibetan calendar: མེ་མོ་ཡོས་ལོ་ (female Fire-Hare) −46 or −427 or −1199 — to — ས་ཕོ་འབྲུག་ལོ་ (male Earth-Dragon) −45 or −426 or −1198

Year 173 BC was a year of the pre-Julian Roman calendar. At the time it was known as the Year of the Consulship of Albinus and Laenas (or, less frequently, year 581 Ab urbe condita). The denomination 173 BC for this year has been used since the early medieval period, when the Anno Domini calendar era became the prevalent method in Europe for naming years.

== Events ==
=== By place ===
==== Parthian Empire ====
- The first known session of the Mahestan (a noble advisory council consisting of Zoroastrian priests and aristocrats) is believed to have taken place during Nowruz (the Persian New Year) in this year, under the reign of Mithridates I of Parthia. This council later played a key role in advising the king and, at times, selecting or deposing monarchs.

==== Egypt ====
- Ptolemy VI Philometor marries his sister, Cleopatra II.

==== Roman Republic ====
- Dedication of the Temple of Fortuna Equestris.

==== Seleucid Empire ====
- Antiochus IV pays the remainder of the war indemnity that has been imposed by the Romans on Antiochus III in the Treaty of Apamea (188 BC).

== Births ==
- Antiochus V Eupator, ruler of the Seleucid Empire from 164 BC (d. 162 BC)
- Wang Zhi, Chinese empress of the Han dynasty (d. 126 BC)

== Deaths ==
- Lucius Cornelius Lentulus, Roman consul and general
