= 113 BC =

113 BC in various calendars
- Gregorian calendar: 113 BC; CXIII BC
- Ab urbe condita: 641
- Ancient Egypt era: XXXIII dynasty, 211
- Pharaoh: Ptolemy IX Lathyros, 4
- Ancient Greek Olympiad (summer): 166th Olympiad, year 4
- Assyrian calendar: 4638
- Balinese saka calendar: N/A
- Bengali calendar: −706 – −705
- Berber calendar: 838
- Buddhist calendar: 432
- Burmese calendar: −750
- Byzantine calendar: 5396–5397
- Chinese calendar: 丁卯年 (Fire Rabbit); 2585 or 2378 — to — 戊辰年 (Earth Dragon); 2586 or 2379
- Coptic calendar: −396 – −395
- Discordian calendar: 1054
- Ethiopian calendar: −120 – −119
- Hebrew calendar: 3648–3649
- Hindu calendars
- Vikram Samvat: −56 – −55
- Shaka Samvat: N/A
- Kali Yuga: 2988–2989
- Holocene calendar: 9888
- Iranian calendar: 734 BP – 733 BP
- Islamic calendar: 757 BH – 756 BH
- Javanese calendar: N/A
- Julian calendar: N/A
- Korean calendar: 2221
- Minguo calendar: 2024 before ROC 民前2024年
- Nanakshahi calendar: −1580
- Seleucid era: 199/200 AG
- Thai solar calendar: 430–431
- Tibetan calendar: མེ་མོ་ཡོས་ལོ་ (female Fire-Hare); 14 or −367 or −1139 — to — ས་ཕོ་འབྲུག་ལོ་ (male Earth-Dragon); 15 or −366 or −1138

The migrations of the Cimbri and the Teuton tribes (c. 120–101 BC). Roman victories. Cimbri and Teuton victories.

Year 113 BC was a year of the pre-Julian Roman calendar. At the time it was known as the Year of the Consulship of Caprarius and Carbo (or, less frequently, year 641 Ab urbe condita) and the Fourth Year of Yuanding. The denomination 113 BC for this year has been used since the early medieval period, when the Anno Domini calendar era became the prevalent method in Europe for naming years.

== Events ==
=== By place ===
==== Roman Republic ====
- Battle of Noreia: The Cimbri and Teutones cross the Danube and enter the lands of the Celtic tribe, the Taurisci (centered in what is now Austria and north-eastern Italy). The latter sent emissaries to Rome, seeking help in dealing with the migration. The Senate sends consul Gnaeus Papirius Carbo across the Julian Alps, to deal with the migration at the head of an army (some 30,000 men). He offers guides to escort them out of the territory of the Taurisci. The guides are instructed to lead the tribes to the town of Noreia, where Carbo sets an ambush. The Cimbri manage to discover Carbo's plan, they turn the tables and defeat the Romans during an ambush. Carbo manages to escape with the remnants of his consular army (some 6,000 men) during a heavy thunderstorm. Later, he is indicted by the Senate for losing the battle, but escapes conviction by committing suicide.
- Germanic tribes attack Gaul and northern Iberia.
- Celtiberians lead a war against the Romans.

==== Syria ====
- Antiochus IX Cyzicenus becomes king of the Seleucid Empire.

==== Numidia ====
- Cirta is besieged by Jugurtha.

==== China ====
- The state of Nanyue, a vassal of the Han dynasty, agrees to submit to Han laws and receives envoys to oversee the succession of the young king Zhao Xing.

=== By topic ===
==== Art ====
- An incense burner, later found in the tomb of Liu Sheng, Prince of Zhongshan in Mancheng, Hebei, is made during the Han dynasty. It is now kept at Hebei Provincial Museum, Shijiazhuang.

== Deaths ==
- Decimus Junius Brutus Callaicus, Roman consul and general (b. 180 BC)
- Liu Sheng, Chinese prince of the Han dynasty
- Zhang Qian, Chinese explorer, official and diplomat (b. 164 BC)
