= 159 BC =

159 BC in various calendars
- Gregorian calendar: 159 BC; CLIX BC
- Ab urbe condita: 595
- Ancient Egypt era: XXXIII dynasty, 165
- Pharaoh: Ptolemy VI Philometor, 22
- Ancient Greek Olympiad (summer): 155th Olympiad, year 2
- Assyrian calendar: 4592
- Balinese saka calendar: N/A
- Bengali calendar: −752 – −751
- Berber calendar: 792
- Buddhist calendar: 386
- Burmese calendar: −796
- Byzantine calendar: 5350–5351
- Chinese calendar: 辛巳年 (Metal Snake); 2539 or 2332 — to — 壬午年 (Water Horse); 2540 or 2333
- Coptic calendar: −442 – −441
- Discordian calendar: 1008
- Ethiopian calendar: −166 – −165
- Hebrew calendar: 3602–3603
- Hindu calendars
- Vikram Samvat: −102 – −101
- Shaka Samvat: N/A
- Kali Yuga: 2942–2943
- Holocene calendar: 9842
- Iranian calendar: 780 BP – 779 BP
- Islamic calendar: 804 BH – 803 BH
- Javanese calendar: N/A
- Julian calendar: N/A
- Korean calendar: 2175
- Minguo calendar: 2070 before ROC 民前2070年
- Nanakshahi calendar: −1626
- Seleucid era: 153/154 AG
- Thai solar calendar: 384–385
- Tibetan calendar: ལྕགས་མོ་སྦྲུལ་ལོ་ (female Iron-Snake) −32 or −413 or −1185 — to — ཆུ་ཕོ་རྟ་ལོ་ (male Water-Horse) −31 or −412 or −1184

Year 159 BC was a year of the pre-Julian Roman calendar. At the time it was known as the Year of the Consulship of Dolabella and Nobilior (or, less frequently, year 595 Ab urbe condita) and the Fifth Year of Houyuan. The denomination 159 BC for this year has been used since the early medieval period, when the Anno Domini calendar era became the prevalent method in Europe for naming years.

== Events ==
=== Greece ===
- Attalus II Philadelphus succeeds his brother Eumenes II as king of Pergamon.

==== Seleucid Empire ====
- With the Seleucid victory in Judea over the Maccabees, Alcimus is re-established as the High Priest of Israel, and a strong force is left in Jerusalem to support him. However, he does not enjoy his triumph for long, as he dies soon after from a paralytic stroke.

==== Bactria ====
- While Eucratides I is in north west India to claim possession of the previous Bactrian King Demetrius I's territory there, the Parthians, under Mithradates I, annex two Bactrian provinces. Returning from India to reconquer them, Eucratides is murdered by his son.

== Births ==
- Quintus Mucius Scaevola Augur, politician of the Roman Republic and an early authority on Roman law (d. 88 BC) (approximate date)

== Deaths ==
- Charops of Epirus, ruler of Epirus.
- Alcimus, high priest of Judea.
- Eucratides I, king of Bactria, who has reigned since around 170 BC.
- Eumenes II, king of Pergamon.
- Publius Terentius Afer (Terence), Roman comic dramatist, the author of six verse comedies that are long regarded as models of pure Latin (b. c. 195 BC) (approximate date).
