= 111 BC =

111 BC in various calendars
- Gregorian calendar: 111 BC; CXI BC
- Ab urbe condita: 643
- Ancient Egypt era: XXXIII dynasty, 213
- Pharaoh: Ptolemy IX Lathyros, 6
- Ancient Greek Olympiad (summer): 167th Olympiad, year 2
- Assyrian calendar: 4640
- Balinese saka calendar: N/A
- Bengali calendar: −704 – −703
- Berber calendar: 840
- Buddhist calendar: 434
- Burmese calendar: −748
- Byzantine calendar: 5398–5399
- Chinese calendar: 己巳年 (Earth Snake); 2587 or 2380 — to — 庚午年 (Metal Horse); 2588 or 2381
- Coptic calendar: −394 – −393
- Discordian calendar: 1056
- Ethiopian calendar: −118 – −117
- Hebrew calendar: 3650–3651
- Hindu calendars
- Vikram Samvat: −54 – −53
- Shaka Samvat: N/A
- Kali Yuga: 2990–2991
- Holocene calendar: 9890
- Iranian calendar: 732 BP – 731 BP
- Islamic calendar: 755 BH – 753 BH
- Javanese calendar: N/A
- Julian calendar: N/A
- Korean calendar: 2223
- Minguo calendar: 2022 before ROC 民前2022年
- Nanakshahi calendar: −1578
- Seleucid era: 201/202 AG
- Thai solar calendar: 432–433
- Tibetan calendar: ས་མོ་སྦྲུལ་ལོ་ (female Earth-Snake); 16 or −365 or −1137 — to — ལྕགས་ཕོ་རྟ་ལོ་ (male Iron-Horse); 17 or −364 or −1136

Year 111 BC was a year of the pre-Julian Roman calendar. At the time it was known as the Year of the Consulship of Serapio and Bestia (or, less frequently, year 643 Ab urbe condita) and the Sixth Year of Yuanding. The denomination 111 BC for this year has been used since the early medieval period, when the Anno Domini calendar era became the prevalent method in Europe for naming years.

== Events ==
=== By place ===
==== Roman Republic ====
- The city of Rome is devastated by fire.
- Jugurtha, king of Numidia, bribes the commander Lucius Calpurnius Bestia and Roman friends to secure easy terms. He is given a safe conduct to Rome in order to account for his actions in the Roman Senate. Jugurtha contemptuously bribes his way through all difficulties.

==== China ====
- Han conquest of Nanyue

- In winter, the Han general Yang Pu captures Xunxia Gorge and Shimen and defeats the Nanyue army. He and Han general Lu Bode then attack the Nanyue capital Panyu and receive its surrender. Nanyue's King Zhao Jiande and Premier Lü Jia are captured in flight and killed.
- Nanyue's ally Cangwu submits to the Han dynasty, and Nanyue is divided into nine prefectures. The Han dynasty thereby extends its control to modern-day North Vietnam.

- Han-Xiongnu War: the Han generals Gongsun He and Zhao Ponu invade deep into Xiongnu territory, Gongsun marching from Wuhuan and Zhao from Lingju. However, neither come upon a Xiongnu army. There follows a period of several years in which the Han and Xiongnu seek to establish peace.
- Han-Dongyue War

- Autumn – After learning that Yang Pu had suggested an invasion of Dongyue to Emperor Wu of Han, Dongyue's king, Zou Yushan, declares himself 'Emperor Wu' and sends an army under Zou Li to invade Han territory. They capture Baisha, Wulin and Meiling, and the Han Treasurer Zhang Cheng is executed for avoiding the Dongyue army.
- Emperor Wu of Han sends two maritime fleets and three armies, including an army under Yang Pu, to invade Dongyue.

== Births ==
- Spartacus, Roman slave and rebel leader (d. 71 BC, presumably)

== Deaths ==
- Tryphaena, queen consort of the Seleucid Empire
- Zhao Jiande, last king of Nanyue (or Nam Viet)
