= 138 BC =

138 BC in various calendars
- Gregorian calendar: 138 BC; CXXXVIII BC
- Ab urbe condita: 616
- Ancient Egypt era: XXXIII dynasty, 186
- Pharaoh: Ptolemy VIII Physcon, 8
- Ancient Greek Olympiad (summer): 160th Olympiad, year 3
- Assyrian calendar: 4613
- Balinese saka calendar: N/A
- Bengali calendar: −731 – −730
- Berber calendar: 813
- Buddhist calendar: 407
- Burmese calendar: −775
- Byzantine calendar: 5371–5372
- Chinese calendar: 壬寅年 (Water Tiger); 2560 or 2353 — to — 癸卯年 (Water Rabbit); 2561 or 2354
- Coptic calendar: −421 – −420
- Discordian calendar: 1029
- Ethiopian calendar: −145 – −144
- Hebrew calendar: 3623–3624
- Hindu calendars
- Vikram Samvat: −81 – −80
- Shaka Samvat: N/A
- Kali Yuga: 2963–2964
- Holocene calendar: 9863
- Iranian calendar: 759 BP – 758 BP
- Islamic calendar: 782 BH – 781 BH
- Javanese calendar: N/A
- Julian calendar: N/A
- Korean calendar: 2196
- Minguo calendar: 2049 before ROC 民前2049年
- Nanakshahi calendar: −1605
- Seleucid era: 174/175 AG
- Thai solar calendar: 405–406
- Tibetan calendar: ཆུ་ཕོ་སྟག་ལོ་ (male Water-Tiger) −11 or −392 or −1164 — to — ཆུ་མོ་ཡོས་ལོ་ (female Water-Hare) −10 or −391 or −1163

Year 138 BC was a year of the pre-Julian Roman calendar. At the time it was known as the Year of the Consulship of Serapio and Callaicus (or, less frequently, year 616 Ab urbe condita) and the Third Year of Jianyuan. The denomination 138 BC for this year has been used since the early medieval period, when the Anno Domini calendar era became the prevalent method in Europe for naming years.

== Events ==
=== By place ===
==== Roman Empire ====
- Tautalus surrenders to the Romans.
- Valencia in Spain is founded as a Roman colony.

==== Asia Minor ====
- Attalus III succeeds Attalus II as Attalid king of Pergamon

==== Egypt ====
- Galaestes revolts.

==== Syria ====
- Antiochus VII expels Diodotus Tryphon.
- Tryphon sacks Beirut

==== Parthia ====
- Phraates II becomes emperor of Parthia.

==== China ====
- Grand Empress Dowager Dou, the grandmother of Emperor Wu of Han, purges the high administration of officials to consolidate her power. Among those dismissed are Prime Minister Dou Yong and her own half-brother, the General-in-Chief Tian Fen. Two of the young emperor's closest advisors, Zhao Wan and Wang Zang, are arrested and commit suicide.

=== By topic ===
==== Arts and sciences ====
- Hymn to Apollo is written and inscribed on stone in Delphi; it is the earliest surviving notated music, in a substantial and legible fragment, in the western world.

== Births ==
- Lucius Cornelius Sulla, Roman general and statesman (d. 78 BC)
- Phaedrus the Epicurean, Greek scholar and philosopher

== Deaths ==
- Attalus II Philadelphus, king of Pergamon (b. 220 BC)
- Diodotus Tryphon, king of the Seleucid Empire
- Mithridates I, king of Parthia (b. c. 195 BC)
