= 126 BC =

126 BC in various calendars
- Gregorian calendar: 126 BC; CXXVI BC
- Ab urbe condita: 628
- Ancient Egypt era: XXXIII dynasty, 198
- Pharaoh: Ptolemy VIII Physcon, 20
- Ancient Greek Olympiad (summer): 163rd Olympiad, year 3
- Assyrian calendar: 4625
- Balinese saka calendar: N/A
- Bengali calendar: −719 – −718
- Berber calendar: 825
- Buddhist calendar: 419
- Burmese calendar: −763
- Byzantine calendar: 5383–5384
- Chinese calendar: 甲寅年 (Wood Tiger); 2572 or 2365 — to — 乙卯年 (Wood Rabbit); 2573 or 2366
- Coptic calendar: −409 – −408
- Discordian calendar: 1041
- Ethiopian calendar: −133 – −132
- Hebrew calendar: 3635–3636
- Hindu calendars
- Vikram Samvat: −69 – −68
- Shaka Samvat: N/A
- Kali Yuga: 2975–2976
- Holocene calendar: 9875
- Iranian calendar: 747 BP – 746 BP
- Islamic calendar: 770 BH – 769 BH
- Javanese calendar: N/A
- Julian calendar: N/A
- Korean calendar: 2208
- Minguo calendar: 2037 before ROC 民前2037年
- Nanakshahi calendar: −1593
- Seleucid era: 186/187 AG
- Thai solar calendar: 417–418
- Tibetan calendar: ཤིང་ཕོ་སྟག་ལོ་ (male Wood-Tiger); 1 or −380 or −1152 — to — ཤིང་མོ་ཡོས་ལོ་ (female Wood-Hare); 2 or −379 or −1151

Year 126 BC was a year of the pre-Julian Roman calendar. At the time it was known as the Year of the Consulship of Lepidus and Orestes (or, less frequently, year 628 Ab urbe condita) and the Third Year of Yuanshuo. The denomination 126 BC for this year has been used since the early medieval period, when the Anno Domini calendar era became the prevalent method in Europe for naming years.

== Events ==
=== By place ===
==== Syria ====
- Tyre successfully revolts from the Seleucid Empire.
- Seleucus V Philometor succeeds his father Demetrius II as king of the Seleucid Empire. Due to his youth, his stepmother Cleopatra Thea acts as regent.

==== Xiongnu ====
- Winter 127/6: The Xiongnu ruler Junchen Chanyu dies, and his younger brother Yizhixie, the Luli King of the Left (East), overthrows Junchen's son Yudan and sets himself up as the new Chanyu. Yudan flees to the Han and dies a few months later.

==== China ====
- Summer: In retaliation for the Han conquest of the Ordos Plateau in the previous year, the Xiongnu invade the province of Dai, kill its governor, Gong You, and capture over 1000 of its inhabitants.
- Autumn: The Xiongnu cross into Yanmen and kill or capture over 1000 of the inhabitants.
- Having used the Xiongnu civil war to escape his imprisonment, the diplomat Zhang Qian returns to China and reports on the lands to the west.
- To avoid the Xiongnu and Qiang of the north-west and west respectively, Emperor Wu begins a policy of exploring a possible route of contact with Daxia (Bactria) via India, sending envoys to establish diplomatic relations with and movement through the Dian Kingdom. Wu wishes to receive the submission of Daxia and other states in western Eurasia.

== Deaths ==
- Phraates II, king of the Parthian Empire
- Wang Zhi, Chinese empress of the Han dynasty (b. 173 BC)
