= 109 BC =

109 BC in various calendars
- Gregorian calendar: 109 BC; CIX BC
- Ab urbe condita: 645
- Ancient Egypt era: XXXIII dynasty, 215
- Pharaoh: Ptolemy IX Lathyros, 8
- Ancient Greek Olympiad (summer): 167th Olympiad, year 4
- Assyrian calendar: 4642
- Balinese saka calendar: N/A
- Bengali calendar: −702 – −701
- Berber calendar: 842
- Buddhist calendar: 436
- Burmese calendar: −746
- Byzantine calendar: 5400–5401
- Chinese calendar: 辛未年 (Metal Goat); 2589 or 2382 — to — 壬申年 (Water Monkey); 2590 or 2383
- Coptic calendar: −392 – −391
- Discordian calendar: 1058
- Ethiopian calendar: −116 – −115
- Hebrew calendar: 3652–3653
- Hindu calendars
- Vikram Samvat: −52 – −51
- Shaka Samvat: N/A
- Kali Yuga: 2992–2993
- Holocene calendar: 9892
- Iranian calendar: 730 BP – 729 BP
- Islamic calendar: 752 BH – 751 BH
- Javanese calendar: N/A
- Julian calendar: N/A
- Korean calendar: 2225
- Minguo calendar: 2020 before ROC 民前2020年
- Nanakshahi calendar: −1576
- Seleucid era: 203/204 AG
- Thai solar calendar: 434–435
- Tibetan calendar: ལྕགས་མོ་ལུག་ལོ་ (female Iron-Sheep); 18 or −363 or −1135 — to — ཆུ་ཕོ་སྤྲེ་ལོ་ (male Water-Monkey); 19 or −362 or −1134

Year 109 BC was a year of the pre-Julian Roman calendar. At the time it was known as the Year of the Consulship of Numidicus and Silanus (or, less frequently, year 645 Ab urbe condita) and the Second Year of Yuanfeng. The denomination 109 BC for this year has been used since the early medieval period, when the Anno Domini calendar era became the prevalent method in Europe for naming years.

== Events ==
=== By place ===
==== Roman Republic ====
- A Roman army under Marcus Junius Silanus is defeated by the Cimbri and Teutones near the river Rhône.

==== Asia ====
- Emperor Wu of Han inspects the Han Empire, traveling 9,000 km (5,600 mi). He also sends diplomats to search for the legendary Penglai Island.
- Han campaigns against Dian: Emperor Wu launches a new campaign against the Dian Kingdom and establishes the Yizhou commandery in Yunnan during the dynasty's expansion southward.
- Han invasion of Gojoseon

- After She He, a Han envoy, murders a minor king of the vassal state of Gojoseon and is rewarded by Emperor Wu with a military command, Ugeo, the king of Gojoseon, attacks and kills She He.
- Autumn – Emperor Wu orders the invasion. The Han general Yang Pu crosses the Yellow Sea and marches on the capital Wangxian (Pyongyang) but is defeated outside its gates. Another general, Xun Zhi, invades overland but fails to make headway.
- Peace negotiations are initiated by Emperor Wu but fail due to mutual suspicion.

- The Han general Zhao Ponu and 700 cavalrymen are victorious in the Battle of Loulan in the Tarim Basin, capturing the king of Loulan in the first Han intervention west of the Hexi Corridor.

== Deaths ==
- Paerisades V, king of the Bosporan Kingdom (approximate date)
- Sames II Theosebes Dikaios, king of Commagene
