= 160 BC =

160 BC in various calendars
| Gregorian calendar | 160 BC; CLX BC |
| Ab urbe condita | 594 |
| Ancient Egypt era | XXXIII dynasty, 164 |
| Pharaoh | Ptolemy VI Philometor, 21 |
| Ancient Greek Olympiad (summer) | 155th Olympiad (victor)¹ |
| Assyrian calendar | 4591 |
| Balinese saka calendar | N/A |
| Bengali calendar | −753 – −752 |
| Berber calendar | 791 |
| Buddhist calendar | 385 |
| Burmese calendar | −797 |
| Byzantine calendar | 5349–5350 |
| Chinese calendar | 庚辰年 (Metal Dragon); 2538 or 2331 — to — 辛巳年 (Metal Snake); 2539 or 2332 |
| Coptic calendar | −443 – −442 |
| Discordian calendar | 1007 |
| Ethiopian calendar | −167 – −166 |
| Hebrew calendar | 3601–3602 |
- Hindu calendars
| Vikram Samvat | −103 – −102 |
| Shaka Samvat | N/A |
| Kali Yuga | 2941–2942 |
| Holocene calendar | 9841 |
| Iranian calendar | 781 BP – 780 BP |
| Islamic calendar | 805 BH – 804 BH |
| Javanese calendar | N/A |
| Julian calendar | N/A |
| Korean calendar | 2174 |
| Minguo calendar | 2071 before ROC 民前2071年 |
| Nanakshahi calendar | −1627 |
| Seleucid era | 152/153 AG |
| Thai solar calendar | 383–384 |
| Tibetan calendar | 阳金龙年 (male Iron-Dragon) −33 or −414 or −1186 — to — 阴金蛇年 (female Iron-Snake) −32 or −413 or −1185 |

Year 160 BC was a year of the pre-Julian Roman calendar. At the time it was known as the Year of the Consulship of Gallus and Cethegus (or, less frequently, year 594 Ab urbe condita) and the Fourth Year of Houyuan. The denomination 160 BC for this year has been used since the early medieval period, when the Anno Domini calendar era became the prevalent method in Europe for naming years.

== Events ==
=== By place ===
==== Seleucid Empire ====
- The Seleucid king, Demetrius I Soter defeats a Jewish rebellion at Palestine.
- In response to the Jewish high priest, Alcimus', request for assistance, the Seleucid general Bacchides leads an army into Judea with the intent of reconquering this now independent kingdom. Bacchides rapidly marches through Judea after carrying out a massacre of the Assideans in Galilee. He quickly makes for Jerusalem, besieging the city and trapping Judas Maccabeus, the spiritual and military leader of the Maccabees, inside. However, Judas and many of his supporters manage to escape the siege.
- Judas Maccabeus and many of his supporters regroup to face the Seleucid forces in the Battle of Elasa (near modern day Ramallah). Greatly outnumbered, the Maccabees are defeated and Judas Maccabeus is killed during the battle.
- Judas Maccabeus is succeeded as army commander and leader of the Maccabees by his younger brother, Jonathan Maccabeus.
- Demetrius I defeats and kills the rebel general Timarchus and is recognized as king of the Seleucid empire by the Roman Senate. Demetrius acquires his surname of Soter (meaning Saviour) from the Babylonians, for delivering them from the tyranny of Timarchus. The Seleucid empire is temporarily united again.
- The Parthian King, Mithradates I, seizes Media from the Seleucids following the death of Timarchus.

==== Bactria ====
- The king of Bactria, Eucratides I, is considered to have killed Apollodotus I, an Indo-Greek king who rules the western and southern parts of the Indo-Greek kingdom, when he invades the western territories of that kingdom.

==== China ====
- A Painted banner, from the tomb of the wife of the Marquis of Dai, of the Han dynasty, in Mawangdui, Changsha, Hunan, is made (approximate date). It is nowadays preserved at the Historical museum in Beijing.

==== Armenia ====
- Artavasdes I succeeds his father Artaxias I as king of Armenia.

==== Roman Republic ====
- The Roman playwright Terence's play Adelphoe (The Brothers) is first performed at the funeral of the Roman general, Lucius Aemilius Paullus Macedonicus.

== Births ==
- Jugurtha, King of Numidia (d. 104 BC)
- Theodosius of Bithynia, Greek astronomer and mathematician who will write Spherics, a book on the geometry of the sphere (d. c. 100 BC), later translated from Arabic back into Latin to help restore knowledge of Euclidean geometry to the West.
- Quintus Caecilius Metellus Numidicus, Roman statesman and general

== Deaths ==
- Artaxias I, king of Armenia who has ruled since 190 BC and the founder of the Artaxiad dynasty, whose members would rule the Kingdom of Armenia for nearly two centuries
- Apollodotus I, Indo-Greek king who, since 180 BC, has ruled the western and southern parts of the Indo-Greek kingdom, from Taxila in Punjab to the areas of Sindh and possibly Gujarat
- Gaius Laelius, Roman general and politician who was involved in Rome's victory during the Second Punic War between Rome and Carthage (approximate date)
- Judas Maccabeus, third son of the Jewish priest Mattathias, who led the Maccabean revolt against the Seleucid Empire until his death
- Lucius Aemilius Paullus Macedonicus, Roman consul, politician and general whose victory over the Macedonians in the Battle of Pydna ended the Third Macedonian War (b. c. 229 BC)
- Timarchus, Seleucid nobleman, possibly from Miletus in Anatolia, appointed governor of Media in western Iran by the Seleucid king Antiochus IV Epiphanes and who has rebelled against his successor, Demetrius I Soter, until he is killed in a battle with Demetrius' forces
