= 195 BC =

195 BC in various calendars
- Gregorian calendar: 195 BC; CXCV BC
- Ab urbe condita: 559
- Ancient Egypt era: XXXIII dynasty, 129
- Pharaoh: Ptolemy V Epiphanes, 9
- Ancient Greek Olympiad (summer): 146th Olympiad, year 2
- Assyrian calendar: 4556
- Balinese saka calendar: N/A
- Bengali calendar: −788 – −787
- Berber calendar: 756
- Buddhist calendar: 350
- Burmese calendar: −832
- Byzantine calendar: 5314–5315
- Chinese calendar: 乙巳年 (Wood Snake); 2503 or 2296 — to — 丙午年 (Fire Horse); 2504 or 2297
- Coptic calendar: −478 – −477
- Discordian calendar: 972
- Ethiopian calendar: −202 – −201
- Hebrew calendar: 3566–3567
- Hindu calendars
- Vikram Samvat: −138 – −137
- Shaka Samvat: N/A
- Kali Yuga: 2906–2907
- Holocene calendar: 9806
- Iranian calendar: 816 BP – 815 BP
- Islamic calendar: 841 BH – 840 BH
- Javanese calendar: N/A
- Julian calendar: N/A
- Korean calendar: 2139
- Minguo calendar: 2106 before ROC 民前2106年
- Nanakshahi calendar: −1662
- Seleucid era: 117/118 AG
- Thai solar calendar: 348–349
- Tibetan calendar: ཤིང་མོ་སྦྲུལ་ལོ་ (female Wood-Snake) −68 or −449 or −1221 — to — མེ་ཕོ་རྟ་ལོ་ (male Fire-Horse) −67 or −448 or −1220

Year 195 BC was a year of the pre-Julian Roman calendar. At the time it was known as the Year of the Consulship of Flaccus and Cato (or, less frequently, year 559 Ab urbe condita). The denomination 195 BC for this year has been used since the early medieval period, when the Anno Domini calendar era became the prevalent method in Europe for naming years.

== Events ==
=== By place ===
==== Carthage ====
- Because of his administrative and constitutional reforms in Carthage, Hannibal becomes unpopular with an important faction of the Carthaginian nobility and he is denounced to the Romans for inciting the Seleucid king Antiochus III to take up arms against the Romans. Rome demands that Carthage surrender Hannibal. However, Hannibal voluntarily goes into exile.

==== Seleucid Empire ====
- Tensions between Antiochus III and Rome increase when Hannibal is given refuge by Antiochus III at Ephesus and becomes his adviser.
- After Roman diplomatic intervention, Antiochus III finally halts his war with Egypt. In the peace agreement (the Peace of Lysimachia), Antiochus III formally takes possession of southern Syria, which has been fought over for 100 years by the Ptolemies and Seleucids, and also takes possession of the Egyptian territories in Anatolia.

==== Roman Republic ====
- A Spanish revolt against Roman consolidation of the ex-Carthaginian colonies is effectively put down by Marcus Porcius Cato ("the Censor"). He avoids one defeat by paying the Celtiberians 200 talents (around 120,000 denarii), a much-criticised tactic. On Cato's return to Rome, Aemilius Paulus succeeds him as Roman governor in Spain.
- The Roman sumptuary law, the Lex Oppia, which restricts not only a woman's wealth, but also her display of wealth, is repealed despite consul Marcus Porcius Cato's strong opposition.

==== Greece ====
- The Battle of Gythium is fought between Sparta and a coalition of Rome, Rhodes, the Achaean League and Pergamum. As the port of Gythium is an important Spartan base, the allies decide to capture it before they advance inland to Sparta. The Romans and the Acheans are joined outside the city by the Pergamese and Rhodian fleets. The Spartans hold out; however, the proconsul Titus Quinctius Flamininus arrives with 4,000 extra men. Facing too great an army, the Spartans decide to surrender the city on the condition that the garrison can leave unharmed. As a result, Nabis, the tyrant of Sparta, is forced to abandon the surrounding land and withdraw to the city of Sparta. Later that year, Sparta capitulates to the allies.

==== Egypt ====
- Aristophanes of Byzantium, Greek scholar, critic and grammarian, becomes the chief librarian at Alexandria.

==== China ====
- Facing the suspicion of Emperor Gaozu of Han, Lu Wan, the king of the State of Yan, flees north of the Great Wall of China.
- Gaozu sends general Fan Kuai to seek out Lu Wan but then arrests the general on suspicion of planning to murder Consort Qi and her son to Gaozu, Liu Ruyi. Gaozu dies soon after, and Fan's sister-in-law Empress Lü orders his release.
- Chang'an, the capital of China, is thought to become the largest city in the world at this time, taking over from Pataliputra, the capital of the Mauryan empire.

==== Korea ====
- Haemosu Dangun, the first ruler of Buyeo, dies and his son Mosuri Dangun succeeds him to the throne.

== Births ==
- Mithridates I (or Mithradates), "Great King" of Parthia from about 171 BC who turned Parthia into a major political power and expanded the empire westward into Mesopotamia (d. 138 BC)
- Terence or Publius Terentius Afer, Roman comic playwright (approximate date) (d. 159 BC)

== Deaths ==
- June 1 – Gaozu of Han (or Gao), first emperor of the Chinese Han dynasty, who has ruled since 202 BC (b. 256 or 247 BC)
