= 180 BC =

180 BC in various calendars
Gregorian calendar	180 BC; CLXXX BC
Ab urbe condita	574
Ancient Egypt era	XXXIII dynasty, 144
Pharaoh	Ptolemy VI Philometor, 1
Ancient Greek Olympiad (summer)	150th Olympiad (victor)¹
Assyrian calendar	4571
Balinese saka calendar	N/A
Bengali calendar	−773 – −772
Berber calendar	771
Buddhist calendar	365
Burmese calendar	−817
Byzantine calendar	5329–5330
Chinese calendar	庚申年 (Metal Monkey); 2518 or 2311 — to — 辛酉年 (Metal Rooster); 2519 or 2312
Coptic calendar	−463 – −462
Discordian calendar	987
Ethiopian calendar	−187 – −186
Hebrew calendar	3581–3582
- Hindu calendars
Vikram Samvat	−123 – −122
Shaka Samvat	N/A
Kali Yuga	2921–2922
Holocene calendar	9821
Iranian calendar	801 BP – 800 BP
Islamic calendar	826 BH – 825 BH
Javanese calendar	N/A
Julian calendar	N/A
Korean calendar	2154
Minguo calendar	2091 before ROC 民前2091年
Nanakshahi calendar	−1647
Seleucid era	132/133 AG
Thai solar calendar	363–364
Tibetan calendar	阳金猴年 (male Iron-Monkey) −53 or −434 or −1206 — to — 阴金鸡年 (female Iron-Rooster) −52 or −433 or −1205

Year 180 BC was a year of the pre-Julian Roman calendar. At the time it was known as the Year of the Consulship of Luscus and Piso/Flaccus (or, less frequently, year 574 Ab urbe condita). The denomination 180 BC for this year has been used since the early medieval period, when the Anno Domini calendar era became the prevalent method in Europe for naming years.

== Events ==
=== By place ===
==== Greece ====
- After three years of intriguing against his younger brother Demetrius, including accusing him of coveting the succession to the Macedonian throne and being allied to Rome, Perseus persuades his father King Philip V of Macedon to have Demetrius executed.

==== Roman Republic ====
- Rome completes its subjugation of all of Italy with the defeat of the Ligurians in a battle near modern Genoa. Rome deports 40,000 Ligurians to other areas of the Republic.
- Lucca becomes a Roman colony.

==== Egypt ====
- Ptolemy VI Philometor, aged 6, rules as co-regent with his mother, Cleopatra I, who, although a daughter of a Seleucid king, does not take King Seleucus IV's side and remains on friendly terms with Rome.
- Following the death of Aristophanes of Byzantium, Aristarchus of Samothrace becomes librarian at Alexandria.

==== Bactria ====
- Demetrius I starts his invasion of present-day Pakistan, following the earlier destruction of the Mauryan dynasty by general Pushyamitra Shunga.
- Apollodotus I, a general with Demetrius I of Bactria, becomes king of the western and southern parts of the Indo-Greek kingdom, from Taxila in Punjab to the areas of Sindh and possibly Gujarat. He maintains his allegiance to Demetrius I.

==== China ====
- September 26 – Lü Clan Disturbance. Following the death of Empress Lü, who had been the de facto ruler of the Han dynasty, the Lü Clan is overthrown and massacred by the imperial princes Liu Zhang and Liu Xiang, General-in-Chief Zhou Bo and Prime Minister Chen Ping.
- Fearing reprisals should the young Emperor Houshao and his brothers reach adulthood, the conspirators deny that Emperor Hui was the father of Houshao and his brothers. They overthrow the emperor, and despite the imperial pedigree of Liu Xiang as the son of the eldest son of Gaozu of Han, they eventually agree to elevate Gaozu's oldest surviving son, Emperor Wen, to the throne. After being evicted from the palace, Houshao is executed later in the year.
- Emperor Wen honours the relatives and ancestors of Zhao Tuo, the Chinese-born ruler of Nanyue (in present-day Vietnam and southern China). As a result, Nanyue returns to the Han dynasty as a vassal, although Zhao Tuo continues to call himself an emperor within his own kingdom.

== Births ==
- Apollodorus of Athens, Greek scholar and grammarian (d. c. 120 BC)
- Decimus Junius Brutus Callaicus, Roman consul (d. 113 BC)
- Viriathus, Lusitanian chieftain and general (d. 139 BC)

== Deaths ==
- August 18 – Empress Dowager Lü, de facto ruler of the Chinese Han dynasty and wife of Emperor Gao (b. 241 BC)
- Aristophanes of Byzantium, Greek scholar, critic and grammarian, particularly renowned for his work in Homeric scholarship, but also for work on other classical authors such as Pindar and Hesiod. After early studies under leading scholars in Alexandria, he has been chief librarian since about 195 BC (b. 257 BC)
- Liu Hong, fourth emperor of the Chinese Han dynasty (b. 190 BC)
- Lucius Valerius Flaccus, Roman statesman, consul in 195 BC, censor in 183 BC and colleague of Cato the Elder
- Ptolemy V Epiphanes, king of Egypt (b. 210 BC)
