= 101 BC =

101 BC in various calendars
- Gregorian calendar: 101 BC; CI BC
- Ab urbe condita: 653
- Ancient Egypt era: XXXIII dynasty, 223
- Pharaoh: Ptolemy X Alexander, 7
- Ancient Greek Olympiad (summer): 169th Olympiad, year 4
- Assyrian calendar: 4650
- Balinese saka calendar: N/A
- Bengali calendar: −694 – −693
- Berber calendar: 850
- Buddhist calendar: 444
- Burmese calendar: −738
- Byzantine calendar: 5408–5409
- Chinese calendar: 己卯年 (Earth Rabbit); 2597 or 2390 — to — 庚辰年 (Metal Dragon); 2598 or 2391
- Coptic calendar: −384 – −383
- Discordian calendar: 1066
- Ethiopian calendar: −108 – −107
- Hebrew calendar: 3660–3661
- Hindu calendars
- Vikram Samvat: −44 – −43
- Shaka Samvat: N/A
- Kali Yuga: 3000–3001
- Holocene calendar: 9900
- Iranian calendar: 722 BP – 721 BP
- Islamic calendar: 744 BH – 743 BH
- Javanese calendar: N/A
- Julian calendar: N/A
- Korean calendar: 2233
- Minguo calendar: 2012 before ROC 民前2012年
- Nanakshahi calendar: −1568
- Seleucid era: 211/212 AG
- Thai solar calendar: 442–443
- Tibetan calendar: ས་མོ་ཡོས་ལོ་ (female Earth-Hare); 26 or −355 or −1127 — to — ལྕགས་ཕོ་འབྲུག་ལོ་ (male Iron-Dragon); 27 or −354 or −1126

Year 101 BC was a year of the pre-Julian Roman calendar. At the time it was known as the Year of the Consulship of Marius and Aquillius (or, less frequently, year 653 Ab urbe condita) and the Fourth Year of Taichu. The denomination 101 BC for this year has been used since the early medieval period, when the Anno Domini calendar era became the prevalent method in Europe for naming years.

== Events ==
=== By place ===
==== Roman Republic ====
- July 30 – Battle of Vercellae (Battle of the Raudine Plain or Battle of Campi Raudii): The Roman consuls Gaius Marius and Manius Aquillius defeat the Cimbri.

==== Libya ====
- Ptolemy Apion inherits the kingdom of Cyrenaica.

==== Asia ====
- War of the Heavenly Horses: Han general Li Guangli detaches forces to attack Yucheng. After a failed attack by Wang Shengshen and Hu Chongguo, in which Wang is killed, a new Han detachment under Shangguan Jie defeats and captures the king of Yucheng. The king is then killed by the soldiers escorting him to Li Guangli.
- Han-Xiongnu War: At the beginning of the year, Xulihu Chanyu dies from illness and is succeeded by Qiedihou Chanyu. Qiedihou releases the Han envoys detained by the Xiongnu and receives gifts from Emperor Wu of Han.

== Births ==
- July 13–Julius Caesar

== Deaths ==
- Boiorix, king of the Cimbri (killed at the Battle of Vercellae)
- Cleopatra III, queen of the Ptolemaic Kingdom (assassinated by her son Ptolemy X Alexander I)
