= 104 BC =

104 BC in various calendars
- Gregorian calendar: 104 BC; CIV BC
- Ab urbe condita: 650
- Ancient Egypt era: XXXIII dynasty, 220
- Pharaoh: Ptolemy X Alexander, 4
- Ancient Greek Olympiad (summer): 169th Olympiad (victor)¹
- Assyrian calendar: 4647
- Balinese saka calendar: N/A
- Bengali calendar: −697 – −696
- Berber calendar: 847
- Buddhist calendar: 441
- Burmese calendar: −741
- Byzantine calendar: 5405–5406
- Chinese calendar: 丙子年 (Fire Rat); 2594 or 2387 — to — 丁丑年 (Fire Ox); 2595 or 2388
- Coptic calendar: −387 – −386
- Discordian calendar: 1063
- Ethiopian calendar: −111 – −110
- Hebrew calendar: 3657–3658
- Hindu calendars
- Vikram Samvat: −47 – −46
- Shaka Samvat: N/A
- Kali Yuga: 2997–2998
- Holocene calendar: 9897
- Iranian calendar: 725 BP – 724 BP
- Islamic calendar: 747 BH – 746 BH
- Javanese calendar: N/A
- Julian calendar: N/A
- Korean calendar: 2230
- Minguo calendar: 2015 before ROC 民前2015年
- Nanakshahi calendar: −1571
- Seleucid era: 208/209 AG
- Thai solar calendar: 439–440
- Tibetan calendar: མེ་ཕོ་བྱི་བ་ལོ་ (male Fire-Rat); 23 or −358 or −1130 — to — མེ་མོ་གླང་ལོ་ (female Fire-Ox); 24 or −357 or −1129

Year 104 BC was a year of the pre-Julian Roman calendar. At the time it was known as the Year of the Consulship of Marius and Fimbria (or, less frequently, year 650 Ab urbe condita) and the First Year of Taichu. The denomination 104 BC for this year has been used since the early medieval period, when the Anno Domini calendar era became the prevalent method in Europe for naming years.

== Events ==
=== By place ===
==== Roman Republic ====
- Rome enacts a state of emergency, as the way to Italy lays open to the Germanic invaders. Gaius Marius, the conqueror of Jugurtha, is elected consul for the second time. He celebrates his triumph over Jugurtha, who is led in the procession and thrown into the Tullianum where he dies of starvation.
- Second Servile War: Athenion starts a slave rebellion in Segesta (Sicily).

==== Judea ====
- Aristobulus I succeeds John Hyrcanus, becoming king and high priest of Judea, until 103 BC.

==== Asia ====
- War of the Heavenly Horses: Emperor Wu of Han sends an army of 6000 cavalrymen and 10,000 convicts under Li Guangli to attack Dayuan in modern Kyrgyzstan after Wugua, the king of Dayuan, refuses to send the Han any of the prized horses of Dayuan and, following a contentious meeting with the Han diplomats, has a vassal king kill the diplomats and seize their goods. The Han expeditionary force proceeds with difficulty, marching through arid regions and facing hostile cities.

== Births ==
- Julia, mother of Mark Antony
- Servilia, mistress of Julius Caesar

== Deaths ==
- Dong Zhongshu, Chinese scholar who promoted Confucianism at the central court of the Han dynasty (b. 179 BC)
- Gnaeus Domitius Ahenobarbus, Roman consul and general
- John Hyrcanus, prince and high priest of Judea (b. 164 BC)
- Jugurtha, king of Numidia (execution by Rome) (b. c. 160 BC)
