= 129 BC =

129 BC in various calendars
- Gregorian calendar: 129 BC; CXXIX BC
- Ab urbe condita: 625
- Ancient Egypt era: XXXIII dynasty, 195
- Pharaoh: Ptolemy VIII Physcon, 17
- Ancient Greek Olympiad (summer): 162nd Olympiad, year 4
- Assyrian calendar: 4622
- Balinese saka calendar: N/A
- Bengali calendar: −722 – −721
- Berber calendar: 822
- Buddhist calendar: 416
- Burmese calendar: −766
- Byzantine calendar: 5380–5381
- Chinese calendar: 辛亥年 (Metal Pig); 2569 or 2362 — to — 壬子年 (Water Rat); 2570 or 2363
- Coptic calendar: −412 – −411
- Discordian calendar: 1038
- Ethiopian calendar: −136 – −135
- Hebrew calendar: 3632–3633
- Hindu calendars
- Vikram Samvat: −72 – −71
- Shaka Samvat: N/A
- Kali Yuga: 2972–2973
- Holocene calendar: 9872
- Iranian calendar: 750 BP – 749 BP
- Islamic calendar: 773 BH – 772 BH
- Javanese calendar: N/A
- Julian calendar: N/A
- Korean calendar: 2205
- Minguo calendar: 2040 before ROC 民前2040年
- Nanakshahi calendar: −1596
- Seleucid era: 183/184 AG
- Thai solar calendar: 414–415
- Tibetan calendar: ལྕགས་མོ་ཕག་ལོ་ (female Iron-Boar) −2 or −383 or −1155 — to — ཆུ་ཕོ་བྱི་བ་ལོ་ (male Water-Rat) −1 or −382 or −1154

Year 129 BC was a year of the pre-Julian Roman calendar. At the time it was known as the Year of the Consulship of Tuditanus and Aquillius (or, less frequently, year 625 Ab urbe condita) and the Sixth Year of Yuanguang. The denomination 129 BC for this year has been used since the early medieval period, when the Anno Domini calendar era became the prevalent method in Europe for naming years.

== Events ==
=== By place ===
==== The Roman Republic ====
- The Kingdom of Pergamon becomes the Roman Province of Asia upon the defeat of Aristonicus, pretender to the Attalid throne, by M. Perperna.
- C. Sempronius Tuditanus celebrates his triumph over the Iapydes of Illyria.
- Scipio Aemilianus, victor of Carthage is possibly assassinated by his enemies in Rome.

==== Syria ====
- The Seleucid King Antiochus VII Sidetes is defeated and killed by the Parthians under Phraates II, ending Seleucid control over Media or Mesopotamia.
- Having been freed by the Parthians, Demetrius II of Syria recovers the throne of the Seleucid Empire.

==== China ====
- March: Chen Jiao is deposed as Empress after she asks a sorceress to curse Emperor Wu's favourite consort, Wei Zifu, this being regarded an act of heresy and treason. Wei Zifu is made the new Empress.
- Spring: the Xiongnu raid Shanggu, killing officials and other inhabitants.
- Autumn: Emperor Wu launches his first offensive into the northern steppe against the Xiongnu and their allies. The invasion consists of four armies, each of 10,000 cavalrymen. Two of the four armies are defeated, namely those of Li Guang and Gongsun Ao, and only the army of Wei Qing achieves a victory. Although a modest success, Wei Qing's victory is the first Han success against the Xiongnu. Moreover, it is won at Longcheng, a sacred site far to the north, beyond the Gobi Desert, where the Xiongnu offer sacrifices.
- Winter: the Xiongnu retaliate by crossing the border several times, especially ravaging Yuyang.
- The Han diplomat Zhang Qian escapes Xiongnu custody and resumes his mission of forming an anti-Xiongnu alliance with the Yuezhi. He reaches the State of Dayuan in the Ferghana Valley, whose trade with the Han had been prevented by the Xiongnu and who supply Zhang with guides. Zhang then travels to the states of Kangju, Greater Yuezhi and Daxia (Bactria). He also learns of the Parthian Empire, Daqin, the Caspian Sea and the source of the Yellow River.

=== By topic ===
==== Astronomy ====
- Hipparchus publishes his catalog of stars.
- Total solar eclipse, used by Hipparchus to estimate distance to the Moon.

== Deaths ==
- Antiochus VII Sidetes (killed in battle)
- Carneades, philosopher, and founder of Third Academy (b. c. 214 BC)
- P. Cornelius Scipio Aemilianus Africanus Numantinus (Africanus the Younger) (b. 185 BC)
