= Sauromaces I =

King of Iberia
- Reign: 234–159 BC
- Predecessor: Pharnavaz I
- Successor: Mirian I of Iberia
- Dynasty: Pharnavazid
- Father: Pharnavaz I
- Religion: Georgian paganism

Sauromaces I was a king (mepe) of Kartli (an ancient Georgian kingdom known as Iberia to the Classical sources) listed as the second king in the traditional royal list of medieval Georgian chronicles. Professor Toumanoff suggest the years 234–159 BC as the period of his reign.

The Life of Kings, written c. 800, identifies Saurmag as the son and successor of Parnavaz, the founder of the Parnavaziani dynasty, and establishes a pattern of succession based upon primogeniture. According to this account, the nobles of the realm united to kill Saurmag. Learning of the plot, Saurmag took refuge in the land of Dzurdzuks (ancestors of modern-day Vainakhs), a country of his mother’s origin. With the Dzurdzuk help, Saurmag quashed a revolt, and went on to create a new class of nobles directly dependent on the crown.

The chronicle also states that Saurmag remained adherent to the pro-Seleucid policy adopted by his father. The contemporary ties with the Iranian world are also emphasized by the name “Saurmag” itself, which is based on a root from Scytho-Sarmatian. Saurmag also reportedly married a daughter of the Iranian official based at Partaw. He is reported to have died without a male heir, and succeeded by his adopted son and son-in-law Mirian. Saurmag is also credited with the introduction of the cult of Ainina and Danina.

== Bibliography ==
- Rapp, Stephen H. (2003). Studies In Medieval Georgian Historiography: Early Texts And Eurasian Contexts. Peeters Bvba. ISBN 90-429-1318-5.
- Rapp, Stephen H. (2014). The Sasanian World through Georgian Eyes: Caucasia and the Iranian Commonwealth in Late Antique Georgian Literature. Ashgate Publishing, Ltd. ISBN 978-1472425522.

| Preceded by Pharnavaz I | King of Iberia c. 234–c. 159 BC | Succeeded by Mirian I |
