= 171 BC =

171 BC in various calendars
- Gregorian calendar: 171 BC; CLXXI BC
- Ab urbe condita: 583
- Ancient Egypt era: XXXIII dynasty, 153
- Pharaoh: Ptolemy VI Philometor, 10
- Ancient Greek Olympiad (summer): 152nd Olympiad, year 2
- Assyrian calendar: 4580
- Balinese saka calendar: N/A
- Bengali calendar: −764 – −763
- Berber calendar: 780
- Buddhist calendar: 374
- Burmese calendar: −808
- Byzantine calendar: 5338–5339
- Chinese calendar: 己巳年 (Earth Snake); 2527 or 2320 — to — 庚午年 (Metal Horse); 2528 or 2321
- Coptic calendar: −454 – −453
- Discordian calendar: 996
- Ethiopian calendar: −178 – −177
- Hebrew calendar: 3590–3591
- Hindu calendars
- Vikram Samvat: −114 – −113
- Shaka Samvat: N/A
- Kali Yuga: 2930–2931
- Holocene calendar: 9830
- Iranian calendar: 792 BP – 791 BP
- Islamic calendar: 816 BH – 815 BH
- Javanese calendar: N/A
- Julian calendar: N/A
- Korean calendar: 2163
- Minguo calendar: 2082 before ROC 民前2082年
- Nanakshahi calendar: −1638
- Seleucid era: 141/142 AG
- Thai solar calendar: 372–373
- Tibetan calendar: ས་མོ་སྦྲུལ་ལོ་ (female Earth-Snake) −44 or −425 or −1197 — to — ལྕགས་ཕོ་རྟ་ལོ་ (male Iron-Horse) −43 or −424 or −1196

Year 171 BC was a year of the pre-Julian Roman calendar. At the time it was known as the Year of the Consulship of Crassus and Longinus (or, less frequently, year 583 Ab urbe condita). The denomination 171 BC for this year has been used since the early medieval period, when the Anno Domini calendar era became the prevalent method in Europe for naming years.

== Events ==
=== By place ===
==== Greece ====
- Epirus joins Macedonia in the latter's fight against Rome. However, the leagues of southern Greece remain neutral.
- Thanks to the efforts of Eumenes II of Pergamum while in Rome, the Romans declare war on Macedonia and send troops to Thessaly, thus beginning the Third Macedonian War. In the resulting Battle of Callicinus the Macedonians, led by their king, Perseus, are victorious over a Roman force led by consul Publius Licinius Crassus.
- Boiotian League dissolved by the Romans.

==== Roman Republic ====
- The first Roman colony outside Italy is founded at Carteia in southern Hispania after Iberian-born descendants of Roman soldiers appear before the Roman Senate to request a town to live in and are given Carteia, which is named Colonia Libertinorum Carteia.
- Lucius Postumius Albinus is sent by Rome as an ambassador to King Masinissa of Numidia, and to the Carthaginians in order to raise troops for the war against Perseus of Macedonia.

==== Parthia ====
- Mithradates I succeeds his brother Phraates I as king of Parthia.

== Deaths ==
- Phraates I, King of Parthia, who has ruled the country since 176 BC
