= 125 BC =

125 BC in various calendars
Gregorian calendar	125 BC; CXXV BC
Ab urbe condita	629
Ancient Egypt era	XXXIII dynasty, 199
Pharaoh	Ptolemy VIII Physcon, 21
Ancient Greek Olympiad (summer)	163rd Olympiad, year 4
Assyrian calendar	4626
Balinese saka calendar	N/A
Bengali calendar	−718 – −717
Berber calendar	826
Buddhist calendar	420
Burmese calendar	−762
Byzantine calendar	5384–5385
Chinese calendar	乙卯年 (Wood Rabbit); 2573 or 2366 — to — 丙辰年 (Fire Dragon); 2574 or 2367
Coptic calendar	−408 – −407
Discordian calendar	1042
Ethiopian calendar	−132 – −131
Hebrew calendar	3636–3637
- Hindu calendars
Vikram Samvat	−68 – −67
Shaka Samvat	N/A
Kali Yuga	2976–2977
Holocene calendar	9876
Iranian calendar	746 BP – 745 BP
Islamic calendar	769 BH – 768 BH
Javanese calendar	N/A
Julian calendar	N/A
Korean calendar	2209
Minguo calendar	2036 before ROC 民前2036年
Nanakshahi calendar	−1592
Seleucid era	187/188 AG
Thai solar calendar	418–419
Tibetan calendar	阴木兔年 (female Wood-Rabbit); 2 or −379 or −1151 — to — 阳火龙年 (male Fire-Dragon); 3 or −378 or −1150

Year 125 BC was a year of the pre-Julian Roman calendar. At the time it was known as the Year of the Consulship of Hypsaeus and Flaccus (or, less frequently, year 629 Ab urbe condita) and the Fourth Year of Yuanshuo. The denomination 125 BC for this year has been used since the early medieval period, when the Anno Domini calendar era became the prevalent method in Europe for naming years.

== Events ==
=== By place ===
==== Syria ====
- Cleopatra Thea succeeds to the rule of the Seleucid Empire on the death of Seleucus V. She appoints Antiochus VIII Grypus as co-ruler.

==== Roman Republic ====
- In Rome, Marcus Fulvius Flaccus proposes the extension of Roman citizenship to the northern Italians, but the Senate reacts by sending him off to deal with disturbances around Massilia. And in so doing, commences the conquest of Transalpine Gaul.
- Completion of Aqua Tepula aqueduct in Rome.

==== China ====
- In retaliation for the Han conquest of the Ordos Plateau two years prior, three Xiongnu forces raid the Prefectures of Dai, Dingxiang and Shang.
- The Xiongnu Tuqi (Worthy Prince) of the Right (West), especially angry at the loss of the Ordos Plateau, invades the region and kills or carries off a large number of officials and other inhabitants.

== Births ==
- Quintus Sertorius, Roman statesman and general (d. 73 BC)

== Deaths ==
- Demetrius II, king of the Seleucid Empire
- Seleucus V Philometor (killed by Cleopatra Thea)
