= 112 BC =

112 BC in various calendars
- Gregorian calendar: 112 BC; CXII BC
- Ab urbe condita: 642
- Ancient Egypt era: XXXIII dynasty, 212
- Pharaoh: Ptolemy IX Lathyros, 5
- Ancient Greek Olympiad (summer): 167th Olympiad (victor)¹
- Assyrian calendar: 4639
- Balinese saka calendar: N/A
- Bengali calendar: −705 – −704
- Berber calendar: 839
- Buddhist calendar: 433
- Burmese calendar: −749
- Byzantine calendar: 5397–5398
- Chinese calendar: 戊辰年 (Earth Dragon); 2586 or 2379 — to — 己巳年 (Earth Snake); 2587 or 2380
- Coptic calendar: −395 – −394
- Discordian calendar: 1055
- Ethiopian calendar: −119 – −118
- Hebrew calendar: 3649–3650
- Hindu calendars
- Vikram Samvat: −55 – −54
- Shaka Samvat: N/A
- Kali Yuga: 2989–2990
- Holocene calendar: 9889
- Iranian calendar: 733 BP – 732 BP
- Islamic calendar: 756 BH – 755 BH
- Javanese calendar: N/A
- Julian calendar: N/A
- Korean calendar: 2222
- Minguo calendar: 2023 before ROC 民前2023年
- Nanakshahi calendar: −1579
- Seleucid era: 200/201 AG
- Thai solar calendar: 431–432
- Tibetan calendar: ས་ཕོ་འབྲུག་ལོ་ (male Earth-Dragon); 15 or −366 or −1138 — to — ས་མོ་སྦྲུལ་ལོ་ (female Earth-Snake); 16 or −365 or −1137

Year 112 BC was a year of the pre-Julian Roman calendar. At the time it was known as the Year of the Consulship of Drusus and Caesoninus (or, less frequently, year 642 Ab urbe condita) and the Fifth Year of Yuanding. The denomination 112 BC for this year has been used since the early medieval period, when the Anno Domini calendar era became the prevalent method in Europe for naming years.

== Events ==
=== By place ===
==== Roman Republic ====
- The Roman Senate declares war against Jugurtha following the Siege of Cirta (ends 105 BC).

==== Asia ====
- Han-Nanyue War

- Lü Jia, Premier of the Han vassal state of Nanyue, opposes increased Han control and refuses to appear before the king of Nanyue and the envoys of Han. He rebels against the Han when Emperor Wu sends an armed force of 2,000 men to kill him and his allies. Lü kills king Zhao Xing and his regent, Queen Dowager Jiu, massacres the Han force, and installs Zhao Jiande as king.
- Autumn – Emperor Wu launches a major invasion of Nanyue, sending five riverine fleets to invade under Lu Bode, Yang Pu and three former Yue generals.
- The king of Dongyue, Zou Yushan, sends an army to link up with Yang Pu, but he secretly sends an envoy to Zhao Jiande and halts the transport fleet to await the war's outcome, claiming that the weather is preventing its advance.

- Emperor Wu executes his favourite necromancer Luan Da for fraud.

== Deaths ==
- Adherbal, king of Numidia
- Cleopatra IV, queen of Egypt
- Zhao Xing, ruler of Nanyue
