= 164 BC =

164 BC in various calendars
- Gregorian calendar: 164 BC; CLXIV BC
- Ab urbe condita: 590
- Ancient Egypt era: XXXIII dynasty, 160
- Pharaoh: Ptolemy VI Philometor, 17
- Ancient Greek Olympiad (summer): 154th Olympiad (victor)¹
- Assyrian calendar: 4587
- Balinese saka calendar: N/A
- Bengali calendar: −757 – −756
- Berber calendar: 787
- Buddhist calendar: 381
- Burmese calendar: −801
- Byzantine calendar: 5345–5346
- Chinese calendar: 丙子年 (Fire Rat); 2534 or 2327 — to — 丁丑年 (Fire Ox); 2535 or 2328
- Coptic calendar: −447 – −446
- Discordian calendar: 1003
- Ethiopian calendar: −171 – −170
- Hebrew calendar: 3597–3598
- Hindu calendars
- Vikram Samvat: −107 – −106
- Shaka Samvat: N/A
- Kali Yuga: 2937–2938
- Holocene calendar: 9837
- Iranian calendar: 785 BP – 784 BP
- Islamic calendar: 809 BH – 808 BH
- Javanese calendar: N/A
- Julian calendar: N/A
- Korean calendar: 2170
- Minguo calendar: 2075 before ROC 民前2075年
- Nanakshahi calendar: −1631
- Seleucid era: 148/149 AG
- Thai solar calendar: 379–380
- Tibetan calendar: མེ་ཕོ་བྱི་བ་ལོ་ (male Fire-Rat) −37 or −418 or −1190 — to — མེ་མོ་གླང་ལོ་ (female Fire-Ox) −36 or −417 or −1189

Year 164 BC was a year of the pre-Julian Roman calendar. At the time it was known as the Year of the Consulship of Torquatus and Longinus (or, less frequently, year 590 Ab urbe condita). The denomination 164 BC for this year has been used since the early medieval period, when the Anno Domini calendar era became the prevalent method in Europe for naming years.

== Events ==
=== By place ===
==== Egypt ====
- The Egyptian King Ptolemy VI Philometor is expelled from Alexandria by his brother Ptolemy VIII Euergetes and flees to Rome to seek support.

==== Seleucid Empire ====
- The Seleucid king Antiochus IV Epiphanes died while on a campaign in Tabae (or Gabae, now Isfahan) in Persia. He is succeeded by his son Antiochus V Eupator who is only nine years old. The regent for the boy is the late king's chancellor, Lysias, who was left in charge of Syria when Antiochus IV departed for his campaign in Persia. Lysias is, however, seriously challenged by other Syrian generals and finds himself with a precarious hold on power. To make matters worse for him, the Roman Senate is holding Demetrius, the son of the former king Seleucus IV and, therefore, the rightful heir to the Seleucid throne, as a hostage. By threatening to release him, the Senate can influence events in the Seleucid kingdom.
- The Battle of Beth Zur was fought between Jewish rebel forces led by Judas Maccabeus and a Seleucid army led by the regent Lysias. Judas Maccabeus wins the battle and is able to recapture Jerusalem soon after. Judas purifies the defiled Temple in Jerusalem, destroys the idols erected there by Antiochus IV and restores the service in the Temple. The reconsecration of the Temple becomes an annual feast of dedication in the Jewish calendar, Hanukkah.

==== Roman Republic ====
- Rhodes signs a treaty with Rome and becomes its ally.
- Lucius Aemilius Paullus Macedonicus is elected censor in Rome.

=== By topic ===
==== Art ====
- Construction of the detail of the frieze from the east front of the altar in Pergamon, Athena Attacking the Giants, begins and is finished eight years later. It is now kept at the Staatliche Museen zu Berlin, Antikensammlung, Pergamonmuseum in Berlin, Germany.

==== Astronomy ====
- Halley's Comet makes its regular appearance in the sky, as recorded by a Babylonian scribe. It last appeared in 240 BC.

== Births ==
- Cleopatra Thea Euergetis ("Benefactress"), ruler of the Seleucid kingdom from 125 BC, a daughter of Ptolemy VI of Egypt and his sister/wife Cleopatra II (d. 121 BC) (approximate date)

== Deaths ==
- Antiochus IV Epiphanes ("God Manifest"), Seleucid king of the Syrian kingdom who has reigned since 175 BC, and has encouraged Greek culture and institutions but also attempted to suppress Judaism, which has led to the uprisings in Judea towards the end of his reign (b. c. 215 BC)
