= Hanukkah =

Jewish holiday

Hanukkah חֲנֻכָּה
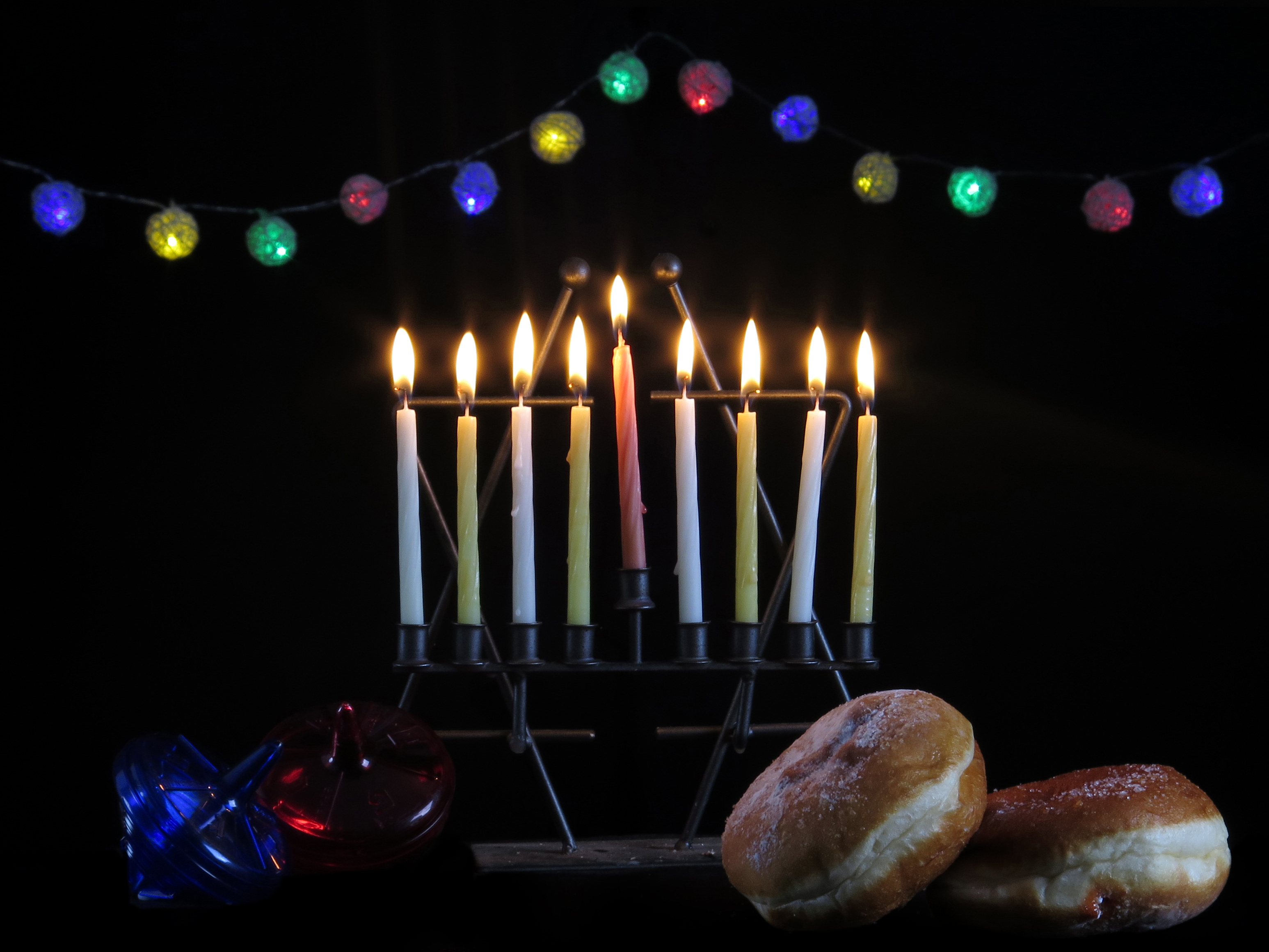
- Dreidels, Hanukkah menorah, and sufganiyot
- Official name: חֲנֻכָּה or חֲנוּכָּה (Note: See ktiv hasar niqqud for the different variations in the Hebrew spelling.) (lit. 'Dedication [of the Temple in Jerusalem]')
- Type: Jewish
- Significance: Commemoration of the Maccabean Revolt against the Seleucid Empire (167–141 BCE): Tractate Shabbat 21b:10 of the Talmud: Chazal taught that the Second Temple was cleansed and the Temple menorah lit with only one day's worth of pure olive oil, yet it miraculously burned for eight days
- Celebrations: Lighting candles each night. Singing special songs, such as Ma'oz Tzur. Reciting the Hallel during Shaḥarit. Eating oil-fried foods, such as latkes and sufganiyot, and dairy foods. Playing the dreidel game, and giving Hanukkah gelt.
- Begins: 25 Kislev
- Ends: 2 Tevet (Note: In years in which Kislev has 30 days) or 3 Tevet (Note: In years in which Kislev has only 29 days)
- Date: 8 of the 9 days: 25 Kislev, 26 Kislev, 27 Kislev, 28 Kislev, 29 Kislev, sometimes 30 Kislev, 1 Tevet, 2 Tevet, and sometimes 3 Tevet
- 2025 date: Sunset, 14 December – nightfall, 22 December
- 2026 date: Sunset, 4 December – nightfall, 12 December
- 2027 date: Sunset, 24 December – nightfall, 1 January
- 2028 date: Sunset, 12 December – nightfall, 20 December
- Frequency: Annual
- Related to: Purim, Day of Salvation and Liberation as a rabbinically decreed holiday.

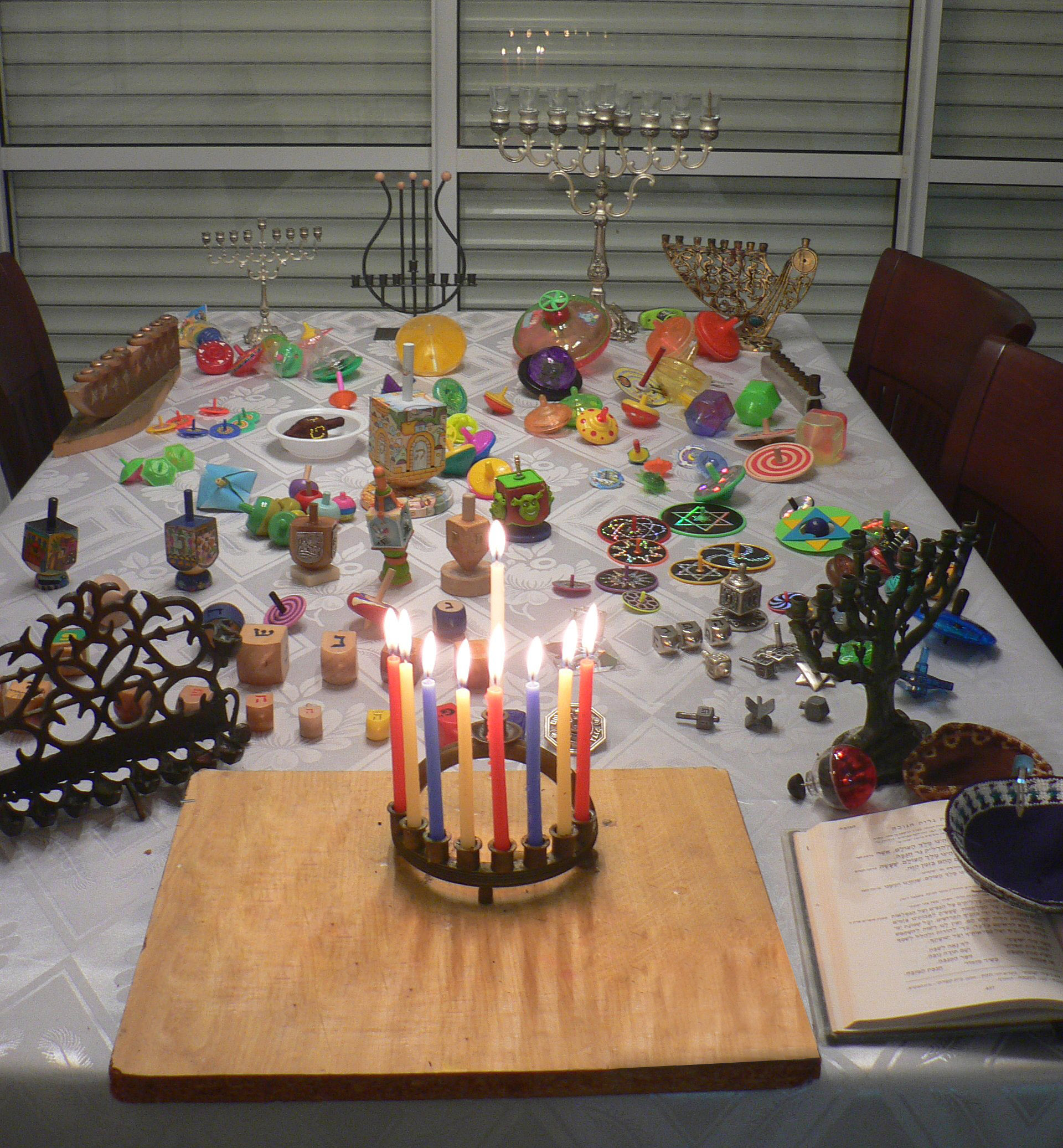
Hanukkah table

Hanukkah (Note: Usually spelled חֲנוּכָּה, pronounced [χanuˈka] in Modern Hebrew, [ˈχanukə] or [ˈχanikə] in Yiddish; a transliteration also romanized as Chanukah, Ḥanukah, Chanuka, Chanukkah, Hanuka, and other forms.) (IPA: /ˈhænəkə, ˈhɑːnəkə/; Hebrew: חֲנֻכָּה, romanized: Ḥănukkā, lit. 'dedication',) is a Jewish holiday that commemorates the Maccabean Revolt against the Seleucid Empire in the 2nd century BCE, when the Maccabees successfully recovered Jerusalem and the Second Temple.

Beginning on the 25th of Kislev on the Hebrew calendar, Hanukkah lasts for eight nights and days. Each night is marked by lighting a Hanukkah menorah, a nine-branched candelabrum containing spaces for eight ceremonial lights plus one additional candle, the shámash (שַׁמָּשׁ, 'attendant'), which is used to light the others. Aside from the shamash, one candle is lit on the first night, two on the second, and so on, until all eight are burning together on the final night. It is the only Jewish holiday that starts in one month of the Hebrew calendar (Kislev) and concludes in another (Tevet).

Common practices on Hanukkah include certain Jewish prayers; indulging in Hanukkah music; playing the game of dreidel; and consuming fried food and dairy products, such as latke and sufganiyot. Since the 1970s, the Chabad movement within Hasidic Judaism has organized community-wide lightings of public menorahs in locales around the world.

Originally instituted as a feast "like the days of the festival of Sukkot" (2 Maccabees 10:9), it does not entail the corresponding obligations and is therefore a relatively minor holiday in strictly religious terms. Nevertheless, Hanukkah has attained major cultural significance in the Western world and elsewhere, especially among secular Jews, as it often falls during the Christmas and holiday season. Among American Jews, this chronological proximity also contributed to the seasonal gift-giving practice.

== Etymology ==
The name "Hanukkah" derives from the Hebrew verb "חנך", meaning "to dedicate", because on Hanukkah, the Maccabees Jews regained control of Jerusalem and rededicated the Temple.

Many homiletical explanations have been given for the name:

- The name can be broken down into חנו כ״ה, "[they] rested [on the] twenty-fifth", referring to the fact that the Jews ceased fighting on the 25th day of Kislev, the day on which the holiday begins.
- חינוך Chinuch, from the same root, is the name for Jewish education, emphasizing ethical training and discipline.
- חנוכה (Hanukkah) is also the Hebrew acronym for ח נרות והלכה כבית הלל – "Eight candles, and the halakha is according to the House of Hillel". This is a reference to the disagreement between two rabbinical schools of thought – the House of Hillel and the House of Shammai – on the proper order in which to light the Hanukkah flames. Shammai opined that eight candles should be lit on the first night, seven on the second night, and so on down to one on the last night (because the miracle was greatest on the first day). Hillel argued in favor of starting with one candle and lighting an additional one every night, up to eight on the eighth night (because the miracle grew in greatness each day). Jewish law adopted the position of Hillel.
- Psalm 30 is called שיר חנכת הבית Shîr Ḥănukkāt HaBayit, "the Song of the 'Dedication' of the House", and is traditionally recited on Hanukkah. 25 (of Kislev) + 5 (Books of Torah) = 30, which is the number of the song.

=== Alternative spellings ===
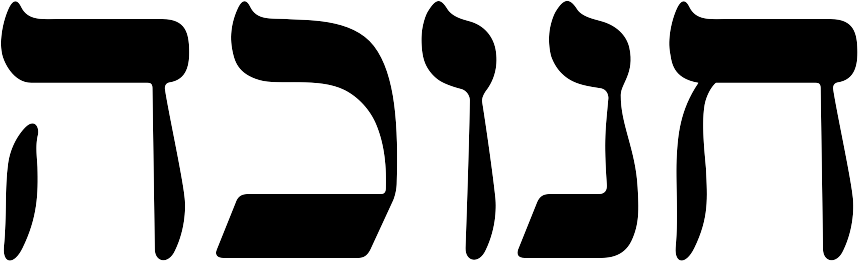
Spelling variations due to transliteration of Hebrew Ḥet Nun Vav Kaf Hey

In Hebrew, the word Hanukkah is written חֲנֻכָּה or חֲנוּכָּה (Ḥănukkā). It is most commonly transliterated to English as Hanukkah or Chanukah. The spelling Hanukkah is the most common and the preferred choice of Merriam–Webster, Collins English Dictionary, the Oxford Style Manual, and the style guides of The New York Times. The Guardian uses "Hanukah" The sound represented by Ch ([χ], similar to the Scottish pronunciation of loch) is not native to the English language, so those not familiar with Hebrew pronunciation may pronounce it with an h ([h]). (Note: Its use in transliteration of Hebrew into English is based on influences of Yiddish and German, particularly since transliteration into German tended to be earlier than transliteration into English. See Romanization of Hebrew) Furthermore, the letter ḥeth (ח), which is the first letter in the Hebrew spelling, is pronounced differently in modern Hebrew (voiceless uvular fricative) from in classical Hebrew (voiceless pharyngeal fricative [ħ]), and neither of those sounds is unambiguously representable in English spelling. However, the classical Hebrew sound is closer to the English H than to the Scottish Ch, and Hanukkah more accurately represents the spelling in the Hebrew alphabet. Moreover, the 'kaf' consonant is geminate in classical (but not modern) Hebrew. Adapting the classical Hebrew pronunciation with the geminate and pharyngeal Ḥeth can lead to the spelling Hanukkah, while adapting the modern Hebrew pronunciation with no gemination and uvular Ḥeth leads to the spelling Chanukah.

=== Festival of Lights ===
In Modern Hebrew, Hanukkah may also be called the Festival of Lights (חַג הַאוּרִים, Ḥag HaUrim), based on a comment by Josephus in Antiquities of the Jews, καὶ ἐξ ἐκείνου μέχρι τοῦ δεῦρο τὴν ἑορτὴν ἄγομεν καλοῦντες αὐτὴν φῶτα "And from then on we celebrate this festival, and we call it Lights". The first Hebrew translation of Antiquities (1864) used (חַג הַמְּאֹרוֹת) "Festival of Lamps", but the translation "Festival of Lights" (חַג הַאוּרִים) appeared by the end of the nineteenth century. The term "Festival of Lights" is also commonly used in English.

== Historical sources ==
=== Books of Maccabees ===
The story of Hanukkah is told in the books of the First and Second Maccabees, which describe in detail the re-dedication of the Temple in Jerusalem and the lighting of the menorah. These books, however, are not a part of the canonized Masoretic Text version of the Tanakh (Hebrew and Aramaic language Jewish Bible) used and accepted by normative Rabbinical Judaism and therefore modern Jews (as copied, edited and distributed by a group of Jews known as the Masoretes between the 7th and 10th centuries of the Common Era). However, the books of Maccabees were included among the deuterocanonical books added to the Septuagint, Greek-language translations of the Hebrew Bible (The Tanakh) originally compiled in the mid-3rd century BCE. The Roman Catholic and Orthodox Churches consider the books of Maccabees as a canonical part of the Old Testament.

The eight-day re-dedication of the temple is described in 1 Maccabees, though the miracle of the oil does not appear here. A story similar in character, and older in date, is the one alluded to in 2 Maccabees according to which the relighting of the altar fire by Nehemiah was due to a miracle which occurred on the 25th of Kislev, and which appears to be given as the reason for the selection of the same date for the rededication of the altar by Judah Maccabee. The above account in 1 Maccabees, as well as 2 Maccabees portrays the feast as a delayed observation of the eight-day Feast of Booths (Sukkot); similarly 2 Maccabees explains the length of the feast as "in the manner of the Feast of Booths".

=== Early rabbinic sources ===
Megillat Taanit (1st century) contains a list of festive days on which fasting or eulogizing is forbidden. It specifies, "On the 25th of [Kislev] is Hanukkah of eight days, and one is not to eulogize". The scholion (9th-10th century) then references the story of the rededication of the Temple and the miracle of the cruse of oil.

The Mishna (late 2nd century) mentions Hanukkah in several places, but never describes its laws in detail and never mentions any aspect of the history behind it. To explain the Mishna's lack of a systematic discussion of Hanukkah, Nissim ben Jacob postulated that information on the holiday was so commonplace that the Mishna felt no need to explain it. Modern scholar Reuvein Margolies suggests that as the Mishnah was redacted after the Bar Kochba revolt, its editors were reluctant to include explicit discussion of a holiday celebrating another relatively recent revolt against a foreign ruler, for fear of antagonizing the Romans.

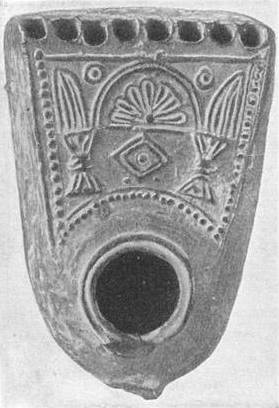
Hanukkah lamp unearthed near Jerusalem about 1900

The miracle of the one-day supply of oil miraculously lasting eight days is described in the Talmud, committed to writing about 600 years after the events described in the books of Maccabees. The Talmud says that after the forces of Antiochus IV had been driven from the Temple, the Maccabees discovered that almost all of the ritual olive oil had been profaned. They found only a single container that was still sealed by the High Priest, with enough oil to keep the menorah in the Temple lit for a single day. They used this, yet it burned for eight days (the time it took to have new oil pressed, made ready, and delivered).

The Talmud presents three options:

1. The law requires only one light each night per household,
2. A better practice is to light one light each night for each member of the household
3. The most preferred practice is to vary the number of lights each night.

Except in times of danger, the lights were to be placed outside one's door, on the opposite side of the mezuza, or in the window closest to the street. Rashi, in a note to Shabbat 21b, says their purpose is to publicize the miracle. The blessings for Hanukkah lights are discussed in tractate Succah, p. 46a.

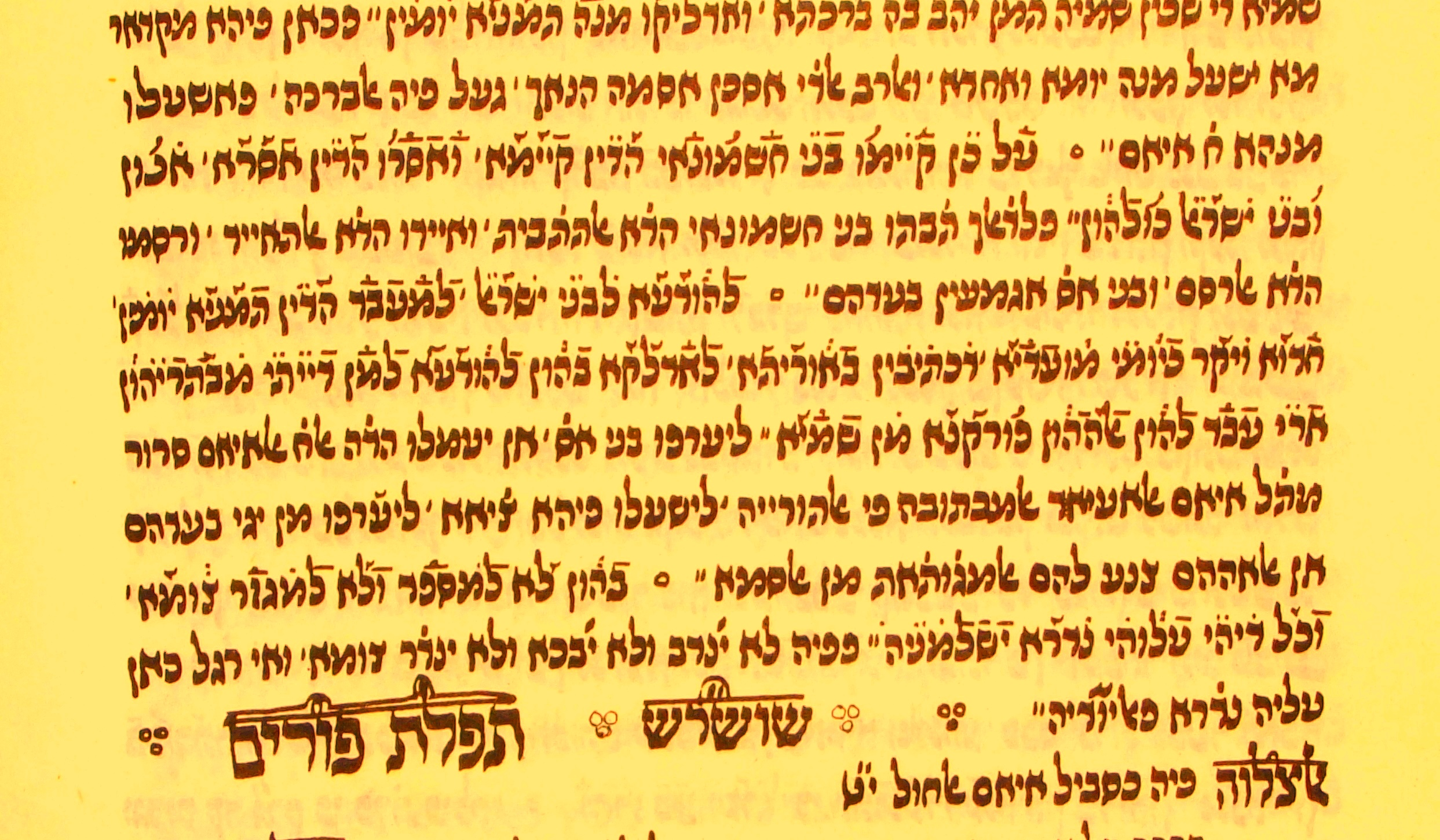
Section from the Aramaic Scroll of Antiochus in Babylonian supralinear punctuation, with an Arabic translation

Megillat Antiochus (probably composed in the 2nd century) concludes with the following words:

...After this, the sons of Israel went up to the Temple and rebuilt its gates and purified the Temple from the dead bodies and from the defilement. And they sought after pure olive oil to light the lamps therewith, but could not find any, except one bowl that was sealed with the signet ring of the High Priest from the days of Samuel the prophet and they knew that it was pure. There was in it [enough oil] to light [the lamps therewith] for one day, but the God of heaven whose name dwells there put therein his blessing and they were able to light from it eight days. Therefore, the sons of Ḥashmonai made this covenant and took upon themselves a solemn vow, they and the sons of Israel, all of them, to publish amongst the sons of Israel, [to the end] that they might observe these eight days of joy and honour, as the days of the feasts written in [the book of] the Law; [even] to light in them so as to make known to those who come after them that their God wrought for them salvation from heaven. In them, it is not permitted to mourn, neither to decree a fast [on those days], and anyone who has a vow to perform, let him perform it.

The Al HaNissim prayer is recited on Hanukkah as an addition to the Amidah prayer, which was formalized in the late 1st century. Al HaNissim describes the history of the holiday as follows:

In the days of Mattiyahu ben Yohanan, high priest, the Hasmonean and his sons, when the evil Greek kingdom stood up against Your people Israel, to cause them to forget Your Torah and abandon the ways You desire – You, in Your great mercy, stood up for them in their time of trouble; You fought their fight, You judged their judgment, You took their revenge; You delivered the mighty into the hands of the weak, the many into the hands of the few, the impure into the hands of the pure, the evil into the hands of the righteous, the sinners into the hands of those who engaged in Your Torah; You made yourself a great and holy name in Your world, and for Your people Israel You made great redemption and salvation as this very day. And then Your sons came to the inner chamber of Your house, and cleared Your Temple, and purified Your sanctuary, and lit candles in Your holy courtyards, and established eight days of Hanukkah for thanksgiving and praise to Your holy name.

=== Narrative of Josephus ===
The Jewish historian Titus Flavius Josephus narrates in his book, Jewish Antiquities XII, how the victorious Judas Maccabeus ordered lavish yearly eight-day festivities after rededicating the Temple in Jerusalem that had been profaned by Antiochus IV Epiphanes. Josephus does not say the festival was called Hanukkah but rather the "Festival of Lights":

Now Judas celebrated the festival of the restoration of the sacrifices of the temple for eight days, and omitted no sort of pleasures thereon; but he feasted them upon very rich and splendid sacrifices; and he honored God, and delighted them by hymns and psalms. Nay, they were so very glad at the revival of their customs, when, after a long time of intermission, they unexpectedly had regained the freedom of their worship, that they made it a law for their posterity, that they should keep a festival, on account of the restoration of their temple worship, for eight days. And from that time to this we celebrate this festival, and call it Lights. I suppose the reason was because this liberty beyond our hopes appeared to us; and that thence was the name given to that festival. Judas also rebuilt the walls round about the city, and reared towers of great height against the incursions of enemies, and set guards therein. He also fortified the city Bethsura, that it might serve as a citadel against any distresses that might come from our enemies.

=== Other ancient sources ===
In the New Testament, John 10:22–23 says, "Then came the Festival of Dedication at Jerusalem. It was winter, and Jesus was in the temple courts walking in Solomon's Colonnade" (NIV). The Greek noun used appears in the neuter plural as "the renewals" or "the consecrations" (Ancient Greek: τὰ ἐγκαίνια; ta enkaínia). The same root appears in 2 Esdras 6:16 in the Septuagint to refer specifically to Hanukkah. This Greek word was chosen because the Hebrew word for 'consecration' or 'dedication' is Hanukkah (חנכה). The Aramaic New Testament uses the Aramaic word hawdata (a close synonym), which literally means 'renewal' or 'to make new'.

== History ==
=== Background ===
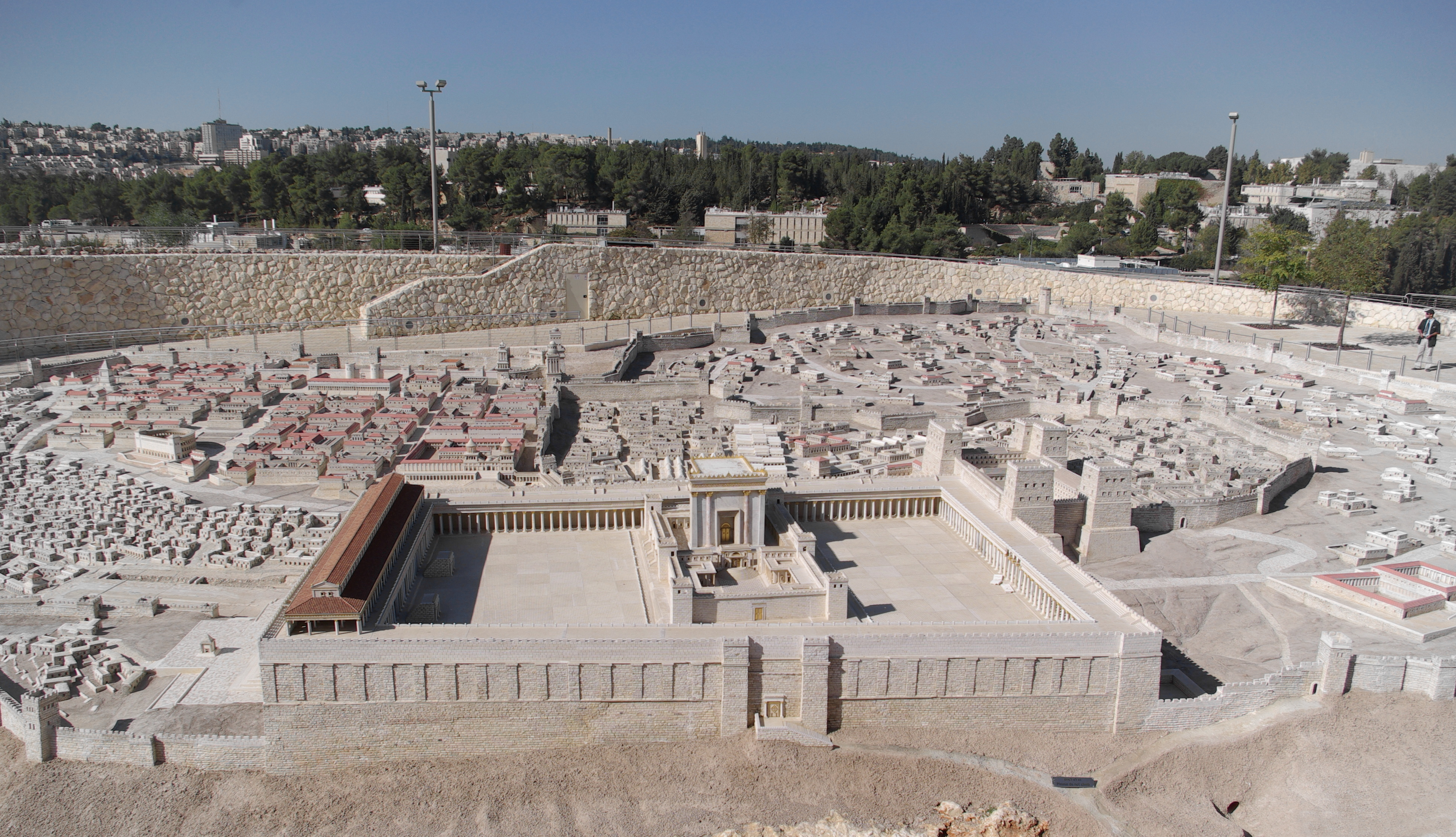
A model of Jerusalem during the Second Temple Period

After the death of Alexander the Great in 323 BCE, Judea became part of the Ptolemaic Kingdom of Egypt until 200 BCE, when King Antiochus III the Great of Syria defeated King Ptolemy V Epiphanes of Egypt at the Battle of Panium. Judea then became part of the Seleucid Empire of Syria. King Antiochus III the Great, wanting to conciliate his new Jewish subjects, guaranteed their right to "live according to their ancestral customs" and to continue to practice their religion in the Temple of Jerusalem. The Seleucids, like the Ptolemies before them, held a suzerainty over Judea, where they respected Jewish culture and protected Jewish institutions. This policy was drastically reversed by Antiochus IV Epiphanes, the son of Antiochus III, seemingly after what was either a dispute over leadership of the Temple in Jerusalem and the office of High Priest, or possibly a revolt whose nature was lost to time after being crushed. In 175 BCE, Antiochus IV invaded Judea at the request of the sons of Tobias. The Tobiads, who led the Hellenizing Jewish faction in Jerusalem, were expelled to Syria around 170 BCE when the high priest Onias and his pro-Egyptian faction wrested control from them. The exiled Tobiads lobbied Antiochus IV Epiphanes to recapture Jerusalem. As Flavius Josephus relates:

The king being thereto disposed beforehand, complied with them, and came upon the Jews with a great army, and took their city by force, and slew a great multitude of those that favored Ptolemy, and sent out his soldiers to plunder them without mercy. He also spoiled the temple, and put a stop to the constant practice of offering a daily sacrifice of expiation for three years and six months.

— The Jewish War

=== Traditional view ===
When the Second Temple in Jerusalem was looted and services stopped, Judaism was outlawed. In 167 BCE, Antiochus ordered an altar to Zeus erected in the Temple. He banned brit milah (circumcision) and ordered pigs to be sacrificed at the altar of the temple.

Antiochus's actions provoked a large-scale revolt. Mattathias (Mattityahu), a Jewish priest, and his five sons Jochanan, Simeon, Eleazar, Jonathan, and Judah led a rebellion against Antiochus. It started with Mattathias killing first a Jew who wanted to comply with Antiochus's order to sacrifice to Zeus, and then a Greek official who was to enforce the government's behest (1 Mac. 2, 24–25). Judah became known as Yehuda HaMakabi ("Judah the Hammer"). By 166 BCE, Mattathias had died, and Judah took his place as leader. By 164 BCE, the Jewish revolt against the Seleucid monarchy was successful. The Temple was liberated and rededicated. The festival of Hanukkah was instituted to celebrate this event. Judah ordered the Temple to be cleansed, a new altar to be built in place of the polluted one and new holy vessels to be made. According to the Talmud,

"For when the Greeks entered the Sanctuary, they defiled all the oils therein, and when the Hasmonean dynasty prevailed against and defeated them, they made search and found only one cruse of oil which lay with the seal of the kohen gadol (high priest), but which contained sufficient [oil] for one day's lighting only; yet a miracle was wrought therein, and they lit [the lamp] therewith for eight days. The following year these [days] were appointed a Festival with [the recital of] Hallel and thanksgiving."

—Shabbat 21b

Tertiary sources in the Jewish tradition make reference to this account.

Maimonides (12th century) described Hanukkah as follows:

When, on the twenty-fifth of Kislev, the Jews had emerged victorious over their foes and destroyed them, they re-entered the Temple where they found only one jar of pure oil, enough to be lit for only a single day; yet they used it for lighting the required set of lamps for eight days, until they managed to press olives and produce pure oil. Because of this, the sages of that generation ruled that the eight days beginning with the twenty-fifth of Kislev should be observed as days of rejoicing and praising the Lord. Lamps are lit in the evening over the doors of the homes, on each of the eight nights, so as to display the miracle. These days are called Hanukkah, when it is forbidden to lament or to fast, just as it is on the days of Purim. Lighting the lamps during the eight days of Hanukkah is a religious duty imposed by the sages.

=== Academic sources ===
Some modern scholars, following the account in 2 Maccabees, observe that the king was intervening in an internal civil war between the Maccabean Jews and the Hellenized Jews in Jerusalem. These competed violently over who would be the High Priest, with traditionalists with Hebrew/Aramaic names like Onias contesting with Hellenizing High Priests with Greek names like Jason and Menelaus. In particular, Jason's Hellenistic reforms would prove to be a decisive factor leading to eventual conflict within the ranks of Judaism. Other authors point to possible socioeconomic reasons in addition to the religious reasons behind the civil war.

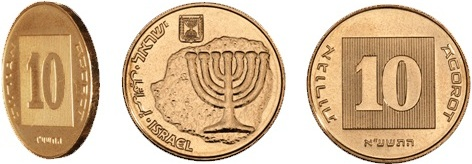
Modern Israeli 10 agorot coin, reproducing the menorah image from a coin issued by Mattathias Antigonus

What began in many respects as a civil war escalated when the Hellenistic kingdom of Syria sided with the Hellenizing Jews in their conflict with the traditionalists. As the conflict escalated, Antiochus took the side of the Hellenizers by prohibiting the religious practices the traditionalists had rallied around. This may explain why the king, in a total departure from Seleucid practice in all other places and times, banned a traditional religion.

The miracle of the oil, first introduced in the Babylonian Talmud in approximately the 6th century C.E., is widely regarded as a legend and its authenticity has been questioned since the Middle Ages. However, given the famous question Joseph Karo (1488–1575) posed concerning why Hanukkah is celebrated for eight days when the miracle was only for seven days (since there was enough oil for one day), it was clear that writing in the 16th century CE, he believed it to be a historical event. This belief has been adopted by most of Orthodox Judaism, in as much as Karo's Shulchan Aruch is a main code of Jewish Law.

=== Timeline ===
- 198 BCE: Armies of the Seleucid king Antiochus III oust Ptolemy V from Judea and Samaria.
- 175 BCE: Antiochus IV ascends the Seleucid throne.
- 168 BCE: Under Antiochus IV, the Second Temple is looted, Jews are massacred, and Jewish religious practices are suppressed.
- 167 BCE: Antiochus IV orders an altar, traditionally dedicated to Zeus, erected in the Temple. Mattathias and his five sons, John, Simon, Eleazar, Jonathan, and Judah, launch a revolt. Judah becomes known as "Judah Maccabee" (Judah the Hammer).
- 166–164 BCE: Mattathias dies; Judah Maccabee assumes leadership and leads successful campaigns against Seleucid forces.
- 164 BCE: The rebels recover Jerusalem and recapture the Second Temple, which is liberated and rededicated (Hanukkah).
- 160–143 BCE: After Judah Maccabee's death at the Battle of Elasa, Jonathan Apphus leads the Hasmoneans, restores their strength, secures recognition from rival Seleucid claimants, and is appointed High Priest in 152 BCE. He expands Jewish autonomy and territory before being captured and executed by Diodotus Tryphon.
- 142 BCE: Effective independence of Hasmonean Judea under Simon Thassi. The Seleucids recognize Jewish autonomy while maintaining nominal overlordship acknowledged by the Hasmoneans. Jewish self-rule continues until Roman intervention in 63 BCE.
- 139 BCE: The Roman Senate recognizes Jewish autonomy through a treaty of friendship and alliance.
- 134 BCE: Antiochus VII Sidetes besieges Jerusalem. Under John Hyrcanus, Judea temporarily accepts temporary Seleucid suzerainty while retaining internal and religious autonomy.
- 129 BCE: Antiochus VII dies. John Hyrcanus casts off Seleucid rule and begins rapid territorial expansion. This continues under Judah Aristobulus and Alexander Jannaeus, who combine the title of king with the high priesthood. Judea conquers Samaria, Galilee, Idumaea, and parts of Transjordan, incorporating the Idumaean population, which is converted to Judaism, possibly by coercion.

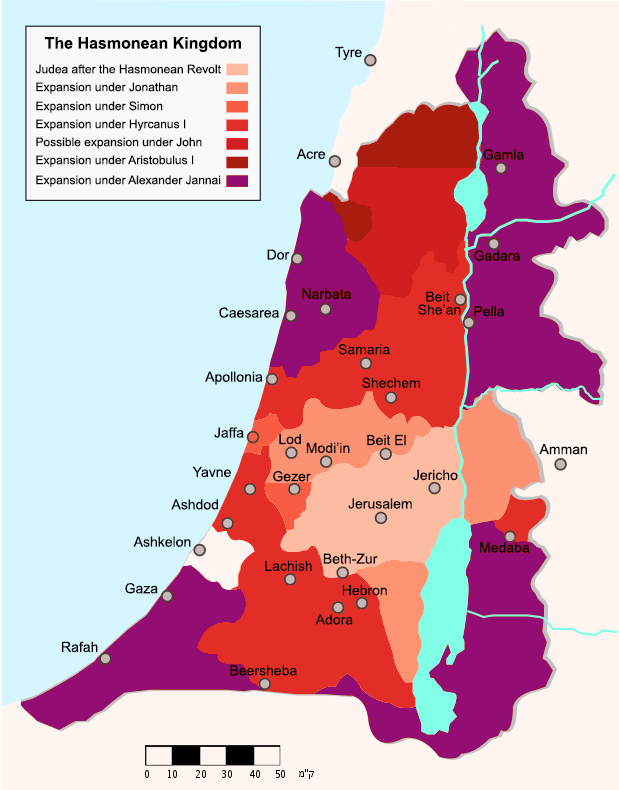
Gradual expansion of the Hasmonean Kingdom, 160–63 BCE

- 96 BCE: A prolonged civil war erupts between Alexander Jannaeus, aligned with the Sadducees, and Pharisaic opponents.
- 85–82 BCE: Consolidation of the Hasmonean kingdom in territories east of the Jordan River.
- 76–67 BCE: Reign of Salome Alexandra, marked by internal stability; the Pharisees dominate governance. Her death in 67 BCE triggers a succession struggle between her sons, Hyrcanus II and Aristobulus II, over the Hasmonean throne.
- 63 BCE: The Hasmonean Jewish Kingdom ends after Aristobulus II and Hyrcanus II appeal to the Roman Republic for intervention. The Roman general Pompey captures Jerusalem after a siege. Thousands of Jews are reportedly killed, including priests at the Temple altar, and Judea becomes a Roman client state, with Hyrcanus II serving as a vassal leader.

=== Battles of the Maccabean Revolt ===
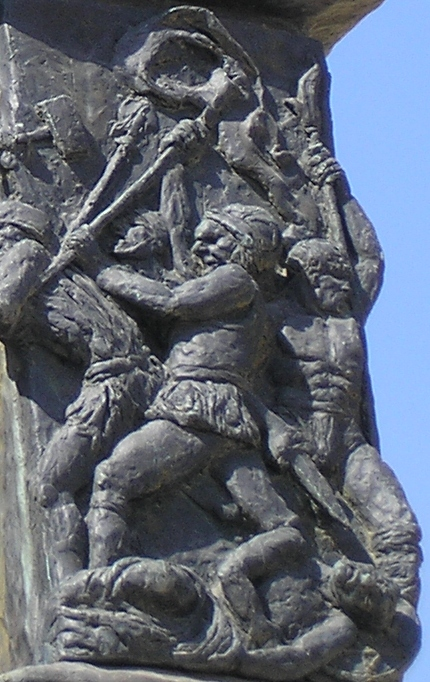
Maccabees on the Knesset Menorah

Selected battles between the Maccabees and the Seleucid Syrian-Greeks:

- Battle with Apollonius and Battle with Seron: Judas Maccabeus defeats two smaller Seleucid detachments.
- Battle of Emmaus: Judas Maccabeus performs a daring night march to make a surprise attack on the Seleucid camp while the Seleucid forces are split.
- Battle of Beth Zur: Judas Maccabeus defeats the army of Lysias, and captures Jerusalem soon after. Lysias relents and repeals Antiochus IV's anti-Jewish decrees.
- Battle of Beth Zechariah: The Seleucids defeat the Maccabees. Eleazar Avaran, another of Mattathias's sons, is killed in battle by a war elephant.
- Battle of Adasa: Judas defeats the forces of Nicanor after killing him early in the battle.
- Battle of Elasa: Judas dies in battle against the army of Bacchides. He is succeeded by his brother Jonathan Apphus, and eventually their other brother Simon Thassi, as leader of the rebellion. The Seleucids re-establish control of the cities for 8 years, but eventually make deals with the Maccabees and appoint their leaders as official Seleucid governors and generals in a vassal-like status before eventual independence.

=== Characters and heroes ===
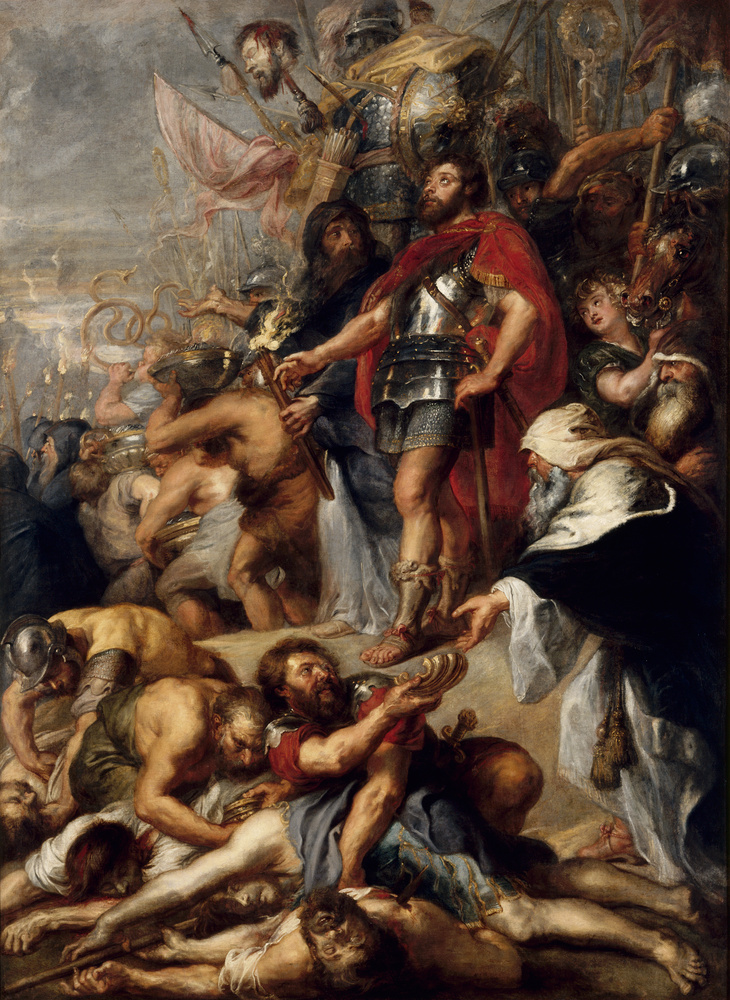
The Triumph of Judas Maccabeus, Rubens, 1634–1636

- Matityahu the Priest, also referred to as Mattathias and Mattathias ben Johanan. Matityahu was a Jewish priest who, together with his five sons, played a central role in the story of Hanukkah.
- Judah the Maccabee, also referred to as Judas Maccabeus and Y'hudhah HaMakabi. Judah was the eldest son of Matityahu and is acclaimed as one of the greatest warriors in Jewish history alongside Joshua, Gideon, and David.
- Eleazar the Maccabee, also referred to as Eleazar Avaran, Eleazar Maccabeus and Eleazar Hachorani/Choran.
- Simon the Maccabee, also referred to as Simon Maccabeus and Simon Thassi.
- Johanan the Maccabee, also referred to as Johanan Maccabeus and John Gaddi.
- Jonathan the Maccabee, also referred to as Jonathan Apphus.
- Antiochus IV Epiphanes. Seleucid king controlling the region during this period.
- Judith. Acclaimed for her heroism in the assassination of Holofernes.
- Hannah and her seven sons. Arrested, tortured and killed one by one, by Antiochus IV Epiphanes for refusing to bow to an idol.

== Rituals ==
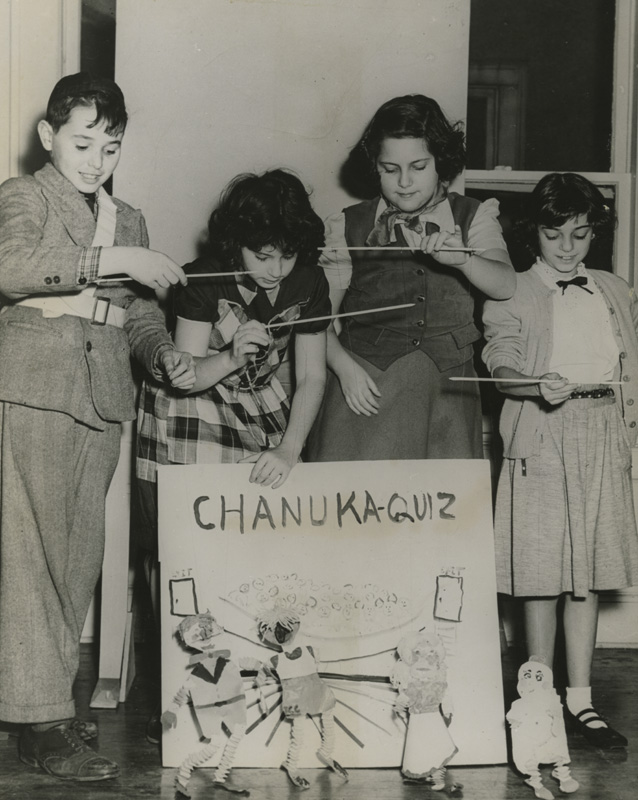
American Jewish children perform the story of Hanukah with marionettes, c. 1940

Hanukkah is celebrated with a series of rituals performed every day throughout the eight-day holiday; some are family-based, and others are communal. There are special additions to the daily prayer service, and a section is added to the blessing after meals.

Hanukkah is not a Shabbat-like holiday, and there is no obligation to refrain from any of the 39 categories of activity prohibited on Shabbat, as specified in the Shulkhan Arukh. Adherents go to work as usual but may leave early to be home to kindle the lights at nightfall. There is no religious reason for schools to be closed, but in Israel, schools close between the second and final days of Hanukkah. Many families exchange gifts each night, such as books or games, and Hanukkah gelt is often given to children. Fried foods—such as latkes (potato pancakes), jelly doughnuts (sufganiyot) and Sephardic bimuelos—are eaten to commemorate the importance of oil during the celebration of Hanukkah. Some also follow a tradition of eating dairy products to remember Judith, who defeated Holofernes by feeding him cheese that made him thirsty, then giving him wine. He became very drunk, which resulted in Judith beheading Holofernes.

=== Kindling the Hanukkah lights ===
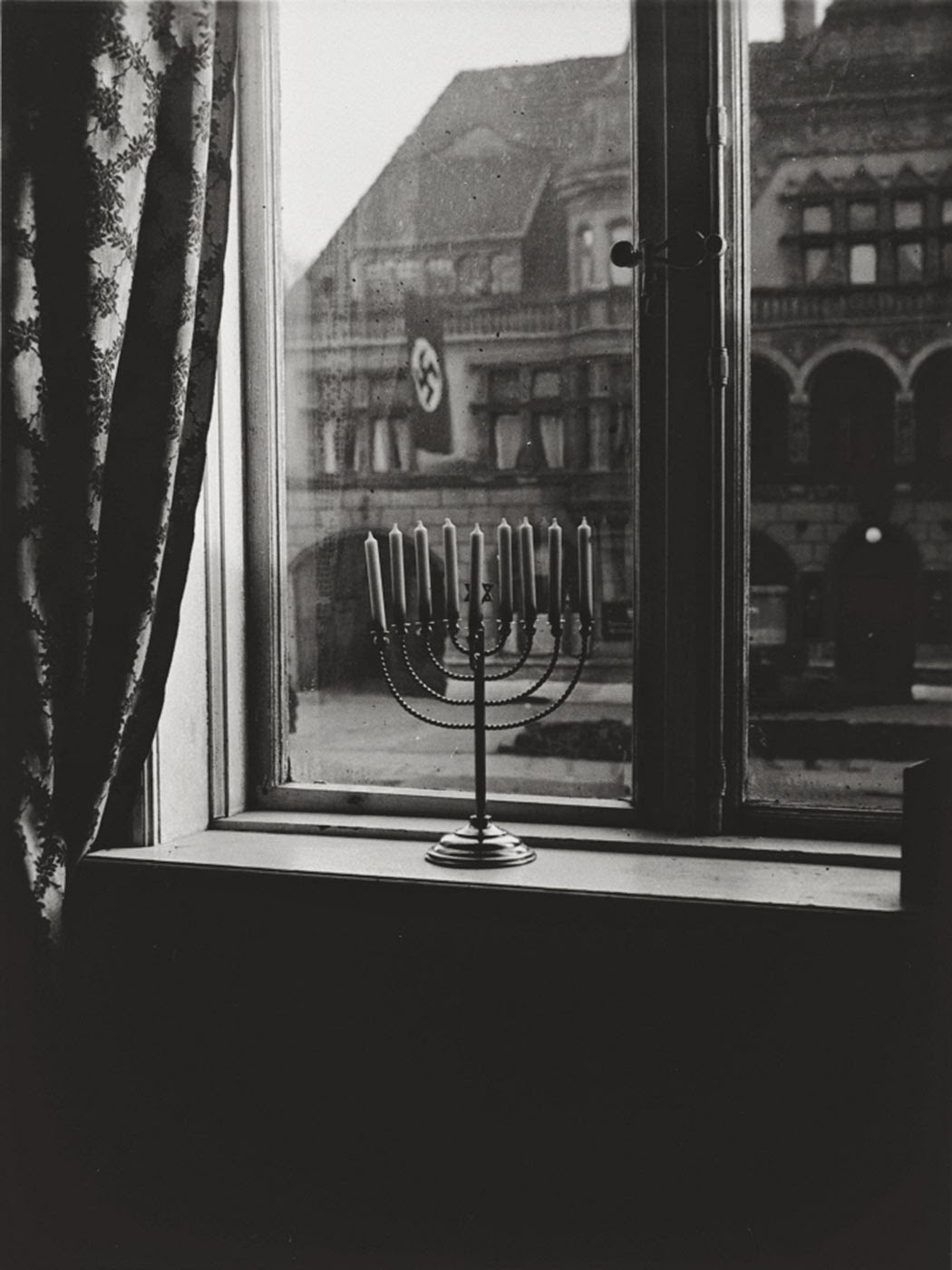
Chanukah Menorah opposite Nazi building in Kiel, Germany, December 1931.

Hanukkah festival at Brandenburg Gate in Berlin, December 2019

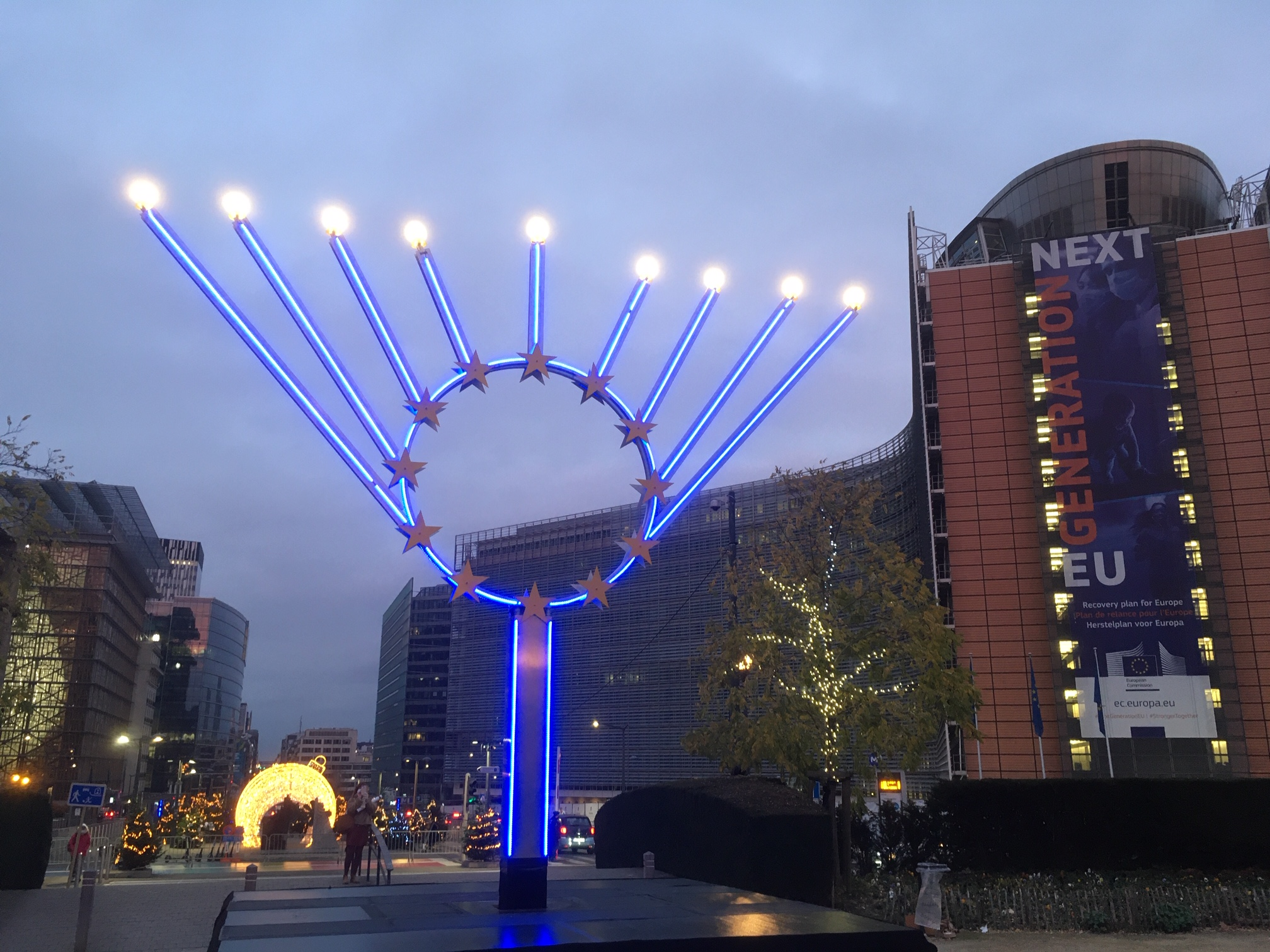
Public Hanukkiah lighting in Brussels next to the Berlaymont building, the headquarters of the European Commission, 2020

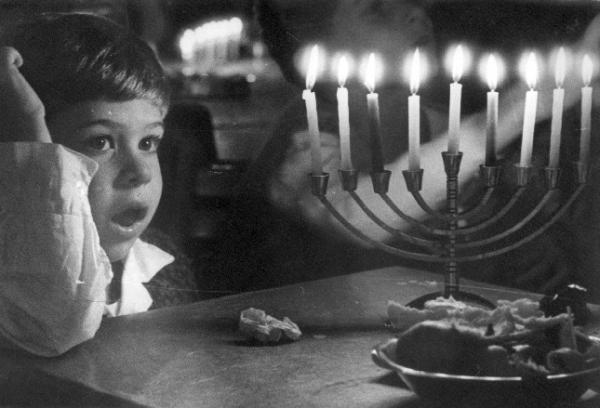
Boy in front of a menorah

Each night throughout the eight-day holiday, a candle or an oil lamp is lit to 'advertise' the miracle. As a universally practiced "beautification" of the mitzvah of lighting candles, the number of lights lit is increased by one each night. An extra light called a shammash ('attendant') is also lit each night, and it is given a distinct location, usually higher, lower, or to the side of the others.

Among Orthodox Ashkenazi Jews, there is a tradition in which every male member of the household (and in many families, females as well) lights a full set of lights each night, while among Sephardim the prevalent custom is to have one set of lights for the entire household.

The purpose of the shammash is to adhere to the prohibition, specified in the Talmud, against using the Hanukkah lights for anything other than publicizing and meditating on the Hanukkah miracle. This differs from Sabbath candles, which are meant for illumination. Hence, if one needed extra illumination on Hanukkah, the shammash candle would be available, and one would avoid using the prohibited lights. Some, especially Ashkenazim, light the shammash candle first and then use it to light the others. So altogether, including the shammash, two lights are lit on the first night, three on the second and so on, ending with nine on the last night, for a total of 44 (36, excluding the shammash). It is Sephardic custom not to light the shammash first and use it to light the rest. Instead, the shammash candle is lit last, and a different candle or a match is used to light all the candles. Some Hasidic Jews follow this Sephardic custom as well.

The lights can be candles or oil lamps. Electric lights are sometimes used and are acceptable in places where open flame is not permitted, such as a hospital room, or for the very elderly and infirm; however, those who permit reciting a blessing over electric lamps only allow it if it is incandescent and battery operated (an incandescent flashlight would be acceptable for this purpose), while a blessing may not be recited over a plug-in menorah or lamp. Most Jewish homes have a special candelabrum called either a Hanukkah menorah (the traditional name, menorah being Hebrew for 'lamp') or a Chanukiah (the modern Israeli term). Some families use an oil-lamp menorah (traditionally filled with olive oil) for Hanukkah; like the candle version, it has eight wicks to light, plus the additional shammash light.

In the United States, Hanukkah became a more visible festival in the public sphere from the 1970s when Rabbi Menachem M. Schneerson called for public awareness and observance of the festival and encouraged the lighting of public menorahs.

The reason for the Hanukkah lights is not for the "lighting of the house within", but rather for the "illumination of the house without", so that passersby should see it and be reminded of the holiday's miracle (i.e. that the sole cruse of pure oil found which held enough oil to burn for one night actually burned for eight nights). Accordingly, lamps are set up at a prominent window or near the door leading to the street. It is customary amongst some Ashkenazi Jews to have a separate menorah for each family member (customs vary), whereas most Sephardi Jews light one for the whole household. Only when there was danger of antisemitic persecution were lamps supposed to be hidden from public view, as was the case in Persia under the rule of the Zoroastrians, or in parts of Europe before and during World War II. However, most Hasidic groups light lamps near an inside doorway, not necessarily in public view. According to this tradition, the lamps are placed on the opposite side from the mezuzah, so people passing through the door are surrounded by the holiness of mitzvot (the commandments).

Generally, women are exempt in Jewish law from time-bound positive commandments, although the Talmud requires that women engage in the mitzvah of lighting Hanukkah candles "for they too were involved in the miracle."

Some Jews in North America and Israel have taken up environmental concerns in relation to Hanukkah's "miracle of the oil", emphasizing reflection on energy conservation and energy independence. An example of this is the Coalition on the Environment and Jewish Life's renewable energy campaign.

=== Candle-lighting time ===
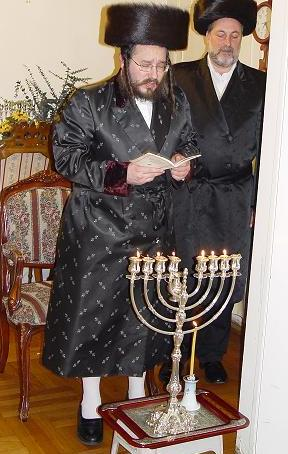
Biala Rebbe lights the menorah

Hanukkah lights should usually burn for at least half an hour after it gets dark. Many light at sundown, while most Hasidim and many other communities light later, generally around nightfall. Many Hasidic Rebbes light much later to fulfill the obligation of publicizing the miracle by the presence of their Hasidim when they kindle the lights.

Inexpensive small wax candles sold for Hanukkah burn for approximately half an hour, so they should be lit no earlier than nightfall. Friday night presents a problem, however. Since candles may not be lit on Shabbat itself, the candles must be lit before sunset. However, they must remain lit through the lighting of the Shabbat candles. Therefore, the Hanukkah menorah is lit first with larger candles than usual, followed by the Shabbat candles. At the end of the Shabbat, some light the Hanukkah lights before Havdalah and those who make Havdalah before lighting the Hanukkah lights.

If, for whatever reason, one did not light at sunset or nightfall, the lights should be kindled later, as long as there are people in the streets. Later than that, the lights should still be kindled, but the blessings should be recited only if there is at least somebody else awake in the house and present at the lighting of the Hannukkah lights.

=== Blessings over the candles ===
Typically, two blessings are recited during this eight-day festival when lighting the candles. On the first night only, the shehecheyanu blessing is added, bringing the total to three blessings.

The blessings are recited before each candle is lit. On the first night of Hanukkah, one light (candle or oil) is lit on the right side of the menorah. On the following night, a second light is placed to the left of the first, lit first, and so on, proceeding from right to left and lighting them from left to right over the eight nights.

==== Blessing for lighting the candles ====
בָּרוּךְ אַתָּה, יהוה אֱלֹהֵינוּ, מֶלֶךְ הָעוֹלָם, אֲשֶׁר קִדְּשָׁנוּ בְּמִצְוֹתָיו, וְצִוָּנוּ לְהַדְלִיק נֵר (שֶׁל) חֲנֻכָּה.

Transliteration: Barukh atah, Adonai Eloheinu, melekh ha'olam, asher kid'shanu b'mitzvotav v'tzivanu l'hadlik ner (shel) Hanukkah.

Translation: "Blessed are You, LORD our God, King of the universe, Who has sanctified us with His commandments and commanded us to kindle the light[s] of Hanukkah." (Note: Some omit the preposition שֶׁל (shel; 'of'), making the meaning rather "the Hanukkah light[s]")

==== Blessing for the miracles of Hanukkah ====
בָּרוּךְ אַתָּה ה' אֱ-לֹהֵינוּ מֶלֶךְ הָעוֹלָם, שֶׁעָשָׂה נִסִּים לַאֲבוֹתֵֽינוּ בַּיָּמִים הָהֵם בַּזְּמַן הַזֶּה.

Transliteration: Barukh ata Adonai Eloheinu, melekh ha'olam, she'asa nisim la'avoteinu ba'yamim ha'heim ba'z'man ha'ze.

Translation: "Blessed are You, LORD our God, King of the universe, Who performed miracles for our ancestors in those days at this time..."

==== Hanerot Halalu ====
After the lights are kindled, the hymn "Hanerot Halalu" is recited. There are several different versions; the version presented here is recited in many Ashkenazic communities:

Ashkenazi version:
Hebrew	Transliteration	English
הַנֵּרוֹת הַלָּלוּ שֶׁאָנוּ מַדְלִיקִין, עַל הַנִּסִּים וְעַל הַנִּפְלָאוֹת וְעַל הַתְּשׁוּעוֹת וְעַל הַמִּלְחָמוֹת, שֶׁעָשִׂיתָ לַאֲבוֹתֵינוּ בַּיָּמִים הָהֵם בַּזְּמַן הַזֶּה, עַל יְדֵי כֹּהֲנֶיךָ הַקְּדוֹשִׁים. וְכָל שְׁמוֹנַת יְמֵי הַחֲנֻכָּה הַנֵּרוֹת הַלָּלוּ קֹדֶשׁ הֵם וְאֵין לָנוּ רְשׁוּת לְהִשְׁתַּמֵּשׁ בָּהֶם, אֶלָּא לִרְאוֹתָם בִּלְבָד, כְּדֵי לְהוֹדוֹת וּלְהַלֵּל לְשִׁמְךָ הַגָּדוֹל עַל נִסֶּיךָ וְעַל נִפְלְאוֹתֶיךָ וְעַל יְשׁוּעָתֶךָ.	Hanneirot hallalu she'anu madlikin 'al hannissim ve'al hanniflaot ve'al hatteshu'ot ve'al hammilchamot, she'asita laavoteinu bayyamim haheim bazzeman hazeh, 'al yedei kohanekha hakkedoshim. Vekhol-shemonat yemei Hanukkah hanneirot hallalu kodesh heim, ve-ein lanu reshut lehishtammesh baheim ella lir'otam bilvad, kedei lehodot ul'halleil leshimcha haggadol 'al nissekha ve'al nifleotekha ve'al yeshu'otekha.	We kindle these lights for the miracles and the wonders, for the redemption and the battles that you made for our forefathers, in those days at this season, through your holy priests. During all eight days of Hanukkah these lights are sacred, and we are not permitted to make ordinary use of them except for to look at them in order to express thanks and praise to Your great Name for Your miracles, Your wonders and Your salvations.

=== Maoz Tzur ===
In the Ashkenazi tradition, each night after the lighting of the candles, the hymn Ma'oz Tzur is sung. The song contains six stanzas. The first and last deal with general themes of divine salvation, and the middle four deal with events of persecution in Jewish history, praising God for survival despite these tragedies (the exodus from Egypt, the Babylonian captivity, the miracle of the holiday of Purim, the Hasmonean victory) and expressing a longing for the days when Judea will finally triumph over Rome.

The song was composed in the thirteenth century by a poet only known through the acrostic found in the first letters of the original five stanzas of the song: Mordechai. The familiar tune is most probably a derivation of a German Protestant church hymn or a popular folk song.

=== Other customs ===
After lighting the candles and Ma'oz Tzur, singing other Hanukkah songs is customary in many Jewish homes. Some Hasidic and Sephardi Jews recite Psalms, such as Psalms 30, 67, and 91. In North America and Israel, it is common to exchange or give presents to children at this time. In addition, many families encourage their children to give tzedakah (charity) in lieu of presents for themselves.

=== Special additions to daily prayers ===
"We thank You also for the miraculous deeds and for the redemption and for the mighty deeds and the saving acts wrought by You, as well as for the wars which You waged for our ancestors in ancient days at this season. In the days of the Hasmonean Mattathias, son of Johanan the high priest, and his sons, when the iniquitous Greco-Syrian kingdom rose up against Your people Israel, to make them forget Your Torah and to turn them away from the ordinances of Your will, then You in your abundant mercy rose up for them in the time of their trouble, pled their cause, executed judgment, avenged their wrong, and delivered the strong into the hands of the weak, the many into the hands of few, the impure into the hands of the pure, the wicked into the hands of the righteous, and insolent ones into the hands of those occupied with Your Torah. Both unto Yourself did you make a great and holy name in Thy world, and unto Your people did You achieve a great deliverance and redemption. Whereupon your children entered the sanctuary of Your house, cleansed Your temple, purified Your sanctuary, kindled lights in Your holy courts, and appointed these eight days of Hanukkah in order to give thanks and praises unto Your holy name."

— Translation of Al ha-Nissim

An addition is made to the "hoda'ah" (thanksgiving) benediction in the Amidah (thrice-daily prayers), called Al HaNissim ("On/about the Miracles"). This addition refers to the victory achieved over the Syrians by the Hasmonean Mattathias and his sons.

The same prayer is added to the grace after meals. In addition, the Hallel (praise) Psalms are sung during each morning service and the Tachanun penitential prayers are omitted.

The Torah is read every day in the shacharit morning services in synagogue, on the first day beginning from Numbers 6:22 (according to some customs, Numbers 7:1), and the last day ending with Numbers 8:4. Since Hanukkah lasts eight days it includes at least one, and sometimes two, Jewish Sabbaths (Saturdays). The weekly Torah portion for the first Sabbath is almost always Miketz, telling of Joseph's dream and his enslavement in Egypt. The Haftarah reading for the first Sabbath Hanukkah is Zechariah 2:14 – Zechariah 4:7. When there is a second Sabbath on Hanukkah, the Haftarah reading is from 1 Kings 7:40–50.

The Hanukkah menorah is also kindled daily in the synagogue, at night with the blessings and in the morning without the blessings.

The menorah is not lit on Shabbat, but rather lit before the beginning of Shabbat, as described above, and not at all during the day. During the Middle Ages, "Megillat Antiochus" was read in the Italian synagogues on Hanukkah just as the Book of Esther is read on Purim. It still forms part of the liturgy of the Yemenite Jews.

=== Zot Hanukkah: Hanukkah as the end of the High Holy Days ===
The last day of Hanukkah is known by some as Zot Hanukkah and by others as Chanukat HaMizbeach, from the verse read on this day in the synagogue Numbers 7:84, Zot Hanukkat Hamizbe'ach: "This was the dedication of the altar". According to the teachings of Kabbalah and Hasidism, this day is the final "seal" of the High Holiday season of Yom Kippur and is considered a time to repent out of love for God. In this spirit, many Hasidic Jews wish each other Gmar chatimah tovah ("may you be sealed totally for good"), a traditional greeting for the Yom Kippur season. Hasidic and Kabbalistic literature teaches that this day is particularly auspicious for the fulfillment of prayers.

Some Hasidic scholars teach that Hanukkah is in fact the conclusion of God's judgment, extending High Holy Days of Rosh Hashana when humanity is judged, and Yom Kippur when the judgment is sealed:

Hassidic masters quote from Kabbalistic sources that God's mercy extends even further, giving the Children of Israel till the final day of Chanukah (known as "Zot Chanukah" based on words which appear in the Torah reading of that day), to return to Him and receive a favorable judgment. They see several hints of this in different verses. One is Isaiah 27:9: "Through this (zot) will Jacob's sin be forgiven" – i.e., on account of the holiness of Zot Chanukah.

=== Other related laws and customs ===
It is customary for women not to work for at least the first half-hour of the candles' burning, and some observe the custom of not working for the entire time the candles burn. It is also forbidden to fast or to eulogize during Hanukkah.

== Customs ==
=== Music ===
Radomsk Hasidic Ma'oz Tzur.

Hanukkah songs (in Hebrew except where indicated) include "Ma'oz Tzur" (Rock of Ages), "Latke'le Latke'le" (Yiddish: "Little Latke, Little Latke"), "Hanukkiah Li Yesh" ("I Have a Hanukkah Menorah"), "Ocho Kandelikas" (Judeo-Spanish: "Eight Little Candles"), "Kad Katan" ("A Small Jug"), "S'vivon Sov Sov Sov" ("Dreidel, Spin and Spin"), "Haneirot Halolu" ("These Candles Which We Light"), "Mi Yimalel" ("Who Can Retell") and "Ner Li, Ner Li" ("I have a Candle").

Among the best known songs in English-speaking countries are "Dreidel, Dreidel, Dreidel" and "Oh Chanukah".

In the Nadvorna Hasidic dynasty, it is customary for the rebbes to play violin after the menorah is lit.

Penina Moise's Hannukah Hymn published in the 1842 Hymns Written for the Use of Hebrew Congregations was instrumental in the beginning of Americanization of Hanukkah.

=== Foods ===
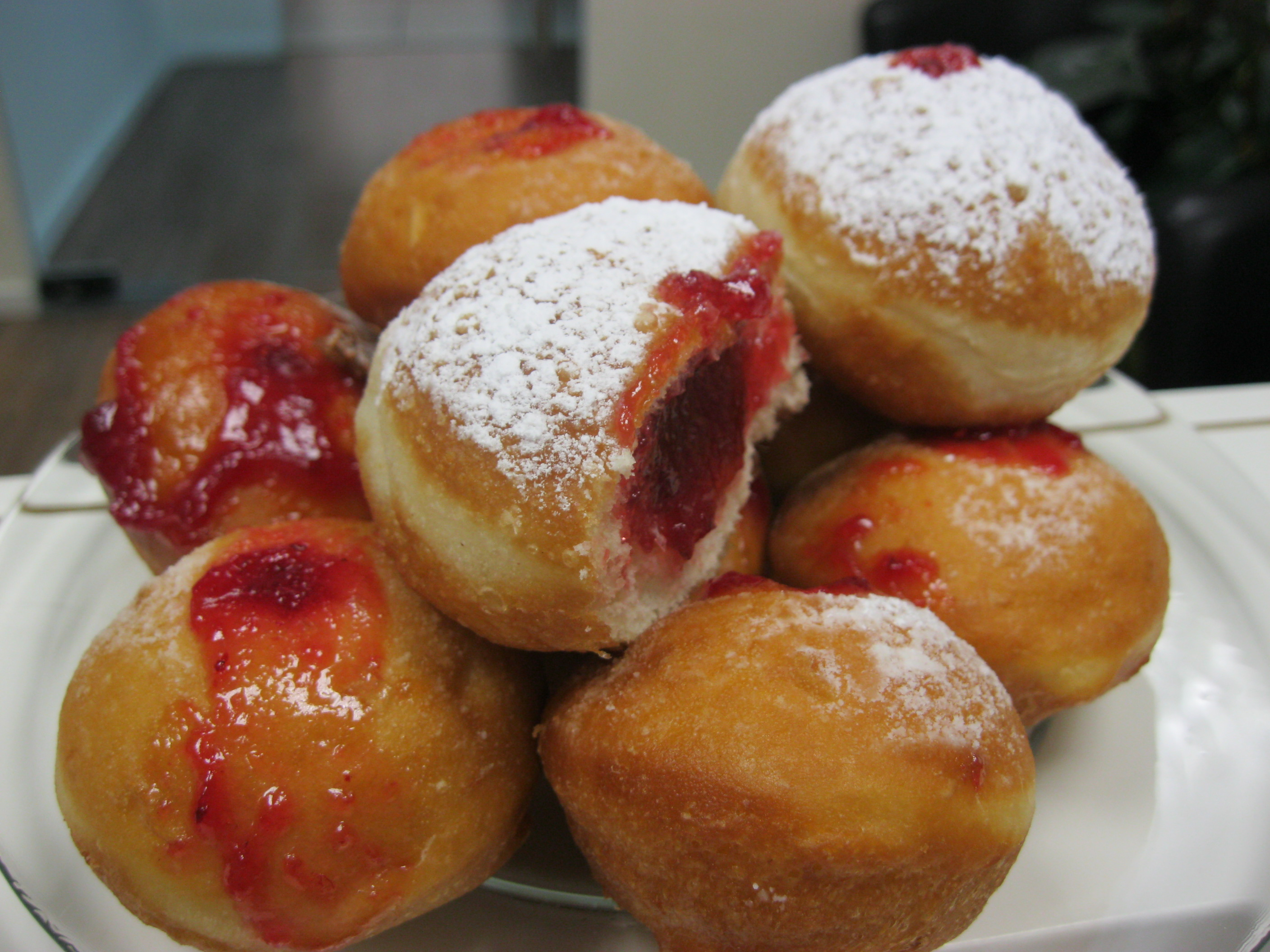
Sufganiyot/doughnuts filled with strawberry jelly

There is a custom of eating foods fried or baked in oil (preferably olive oil) to commemorate the miracle of a small flask of oil keeping the Second Temple's Menorah alight for eight days. Traditional foods include potato pancakes, known as latkes in Yiddish, especially among Ashkenazi families. Sephardi, Polish, and Israeli families eat jam-filled doughnuts (Yiddish: פּאָנטשקעס pontshkes), bimuelos (fritters) and sufganiyot which are deep-fried in oil. Italian Jews and Hungarian Jews traditionally eat cheese pancakes known as "cassola" or "cheese latkes".

Latkes are not popular in Israel, having been largely replaced by sufganiyot due to local economic factors, convenience and the influence of trade unions. Bakeries in Israel have popularized many new types of fillings for sufganiyot besides the traditional strawberry jelly filling, including chocolate cream, vanilla cream, caramel, cappuccino and others. In recent years, downsized, "mini" sufganiyot containing half the calories of the regular, 400-to-600-calorie version, have become popular.

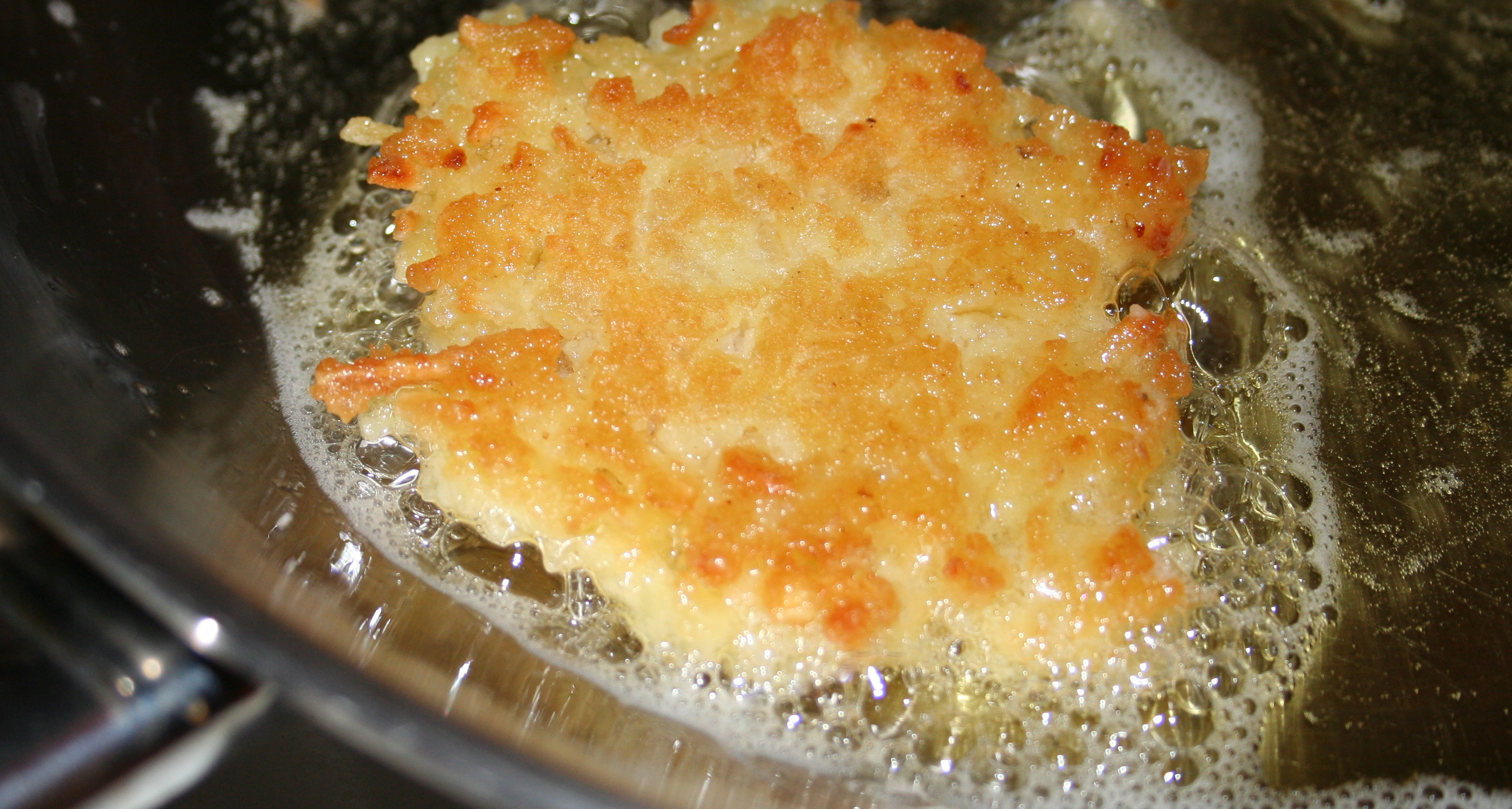
Potato latke frying in hot olive oil.

Rabbinic literature also records a tradition of eating cheese and other dairy products during Hanukkah. This custom, as mentioned above, commemorates the heroism of Judith during the Babylonian captivity of the Jews and reminds us that women also played an important role in the events of Hanukkah. The deuterocanonical book of Judith (Yehudit or Yehudis in Hebrew), which is not part of the Tanakh, records that Holofernes, an Assyrian general, had surrounded the village of Bethulia as part of his campaign to conquer Judea. After intense fighting, the water supply of the Jews was cut off and the situation became desperate. Judith, a pious widow, told the city leaders that she had a plan to save the city. Judith went to the Assyrian camps and pretended to surrender. She met Holofernes, who was smitten by her beauty. She went back to his tent with him, where she plied him with cheese and wine. When he fell into a drunken sleep, Judith beheaded him and escaped from the camp, taking the severed head with her (the beheading of Holofernes by Judith has historically been a popular theme in art). When Holofernes' soldiers found his corpse, they were overcome with fear; the Jews, on the other hand, were emboldened and launched a successful counterattack. The town was saved, and the Assyrians defeated.

Roast goose has historically been a traditional Hanukkah food among Eastern European and American Jews, although the custom has declined in recent decades.

Indian Jews traditionally consume gulab jamun, fried dough balls soaked in a sweet syrup, similar to teiglach or bimuelos, as part of their Hanukkah celebrations.

Italian Jews eat fried chicken, cassola (a ricotta cheese latke almost similar to a cheesecake), and fritelle de riso par Hanukkah (a fried sweet rice pancake).

Romanian Jews eat pasta latkes as a traditional Hanukkah dish.

Syrian Jews consume Kibbet Yatkeen, a dish made with pumpkin and bulgur wheat similar to latkes, as well as their own version of keftes de prasa spiced with allspice and cinnamon.

=== Dreidel ===
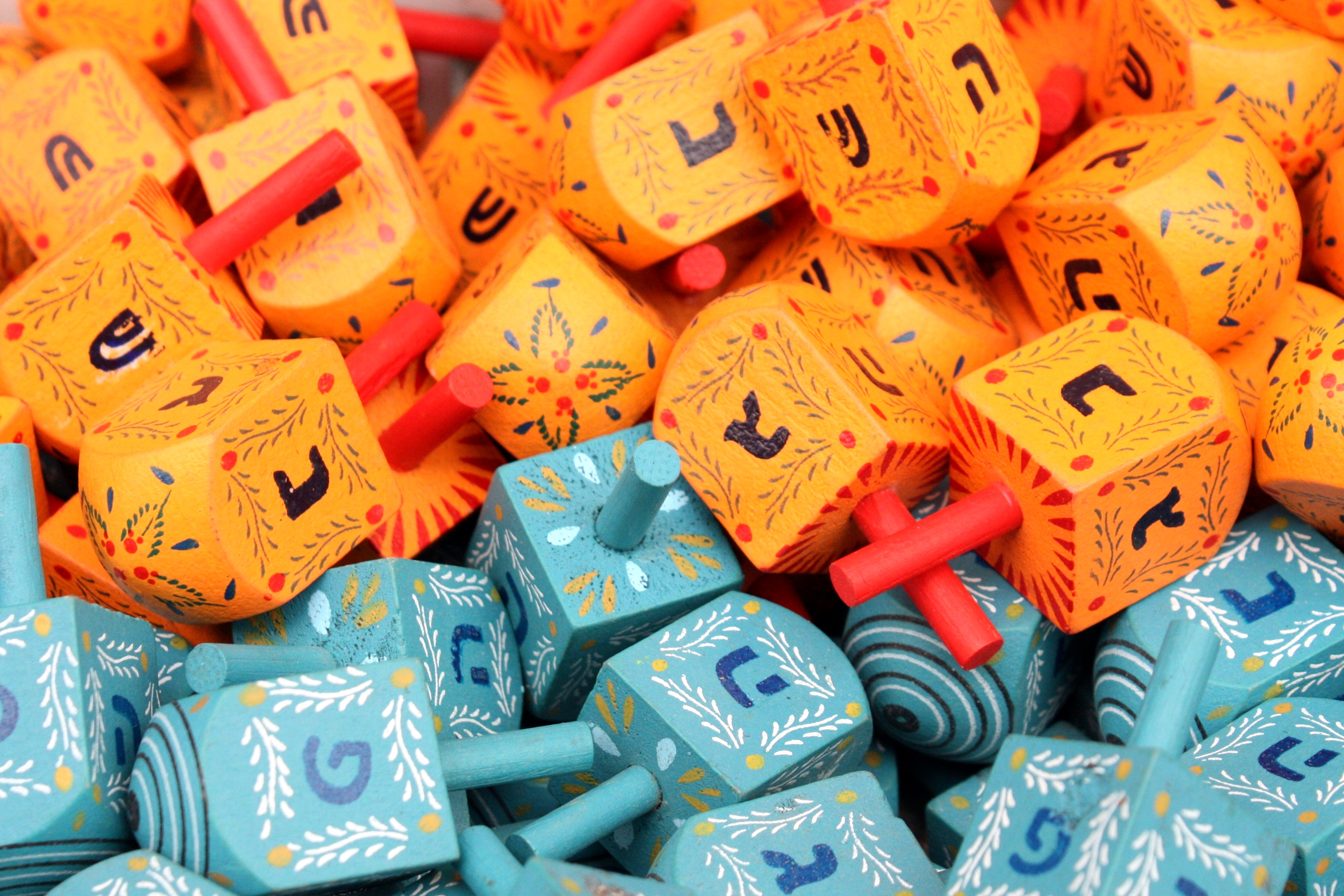
Dreidels in a Jerusalem market

After lighting the candles, it is customary to play (or spin) the dreidel. The dreidel, or סביבון (romanized: sevivon) in Hebrew, is a four-sided spinning top that children play with during Hanukkah. Each side is imprinted with a Hebrew letter which is an abbreviation for the Hebrew words נס גדול היה שם (Nes Gadol Haya Sham, "A great miracle happened there"), referring to the miracle of the oil that took place in the Beit Hamikdash. The fourth side of some dreidels sold in Israel are inscribed with the letter פ (Pe), rendering the acronym נס גדול היה פה (Nes Gadol Haya Po, "A great miracle happened here"), referring to the fact that the miracle occurred in the land of Israel, although this is a relatively recent innovation. Stores in Haredi neighborhoods sell the traditional Shin dreidels as well, because they understand "there" to refer to the Temple and not the entire Land of Israel, and because the Hasidic Masters ascribe significance to the traditional letters.

=== Hanukkah gelt ===
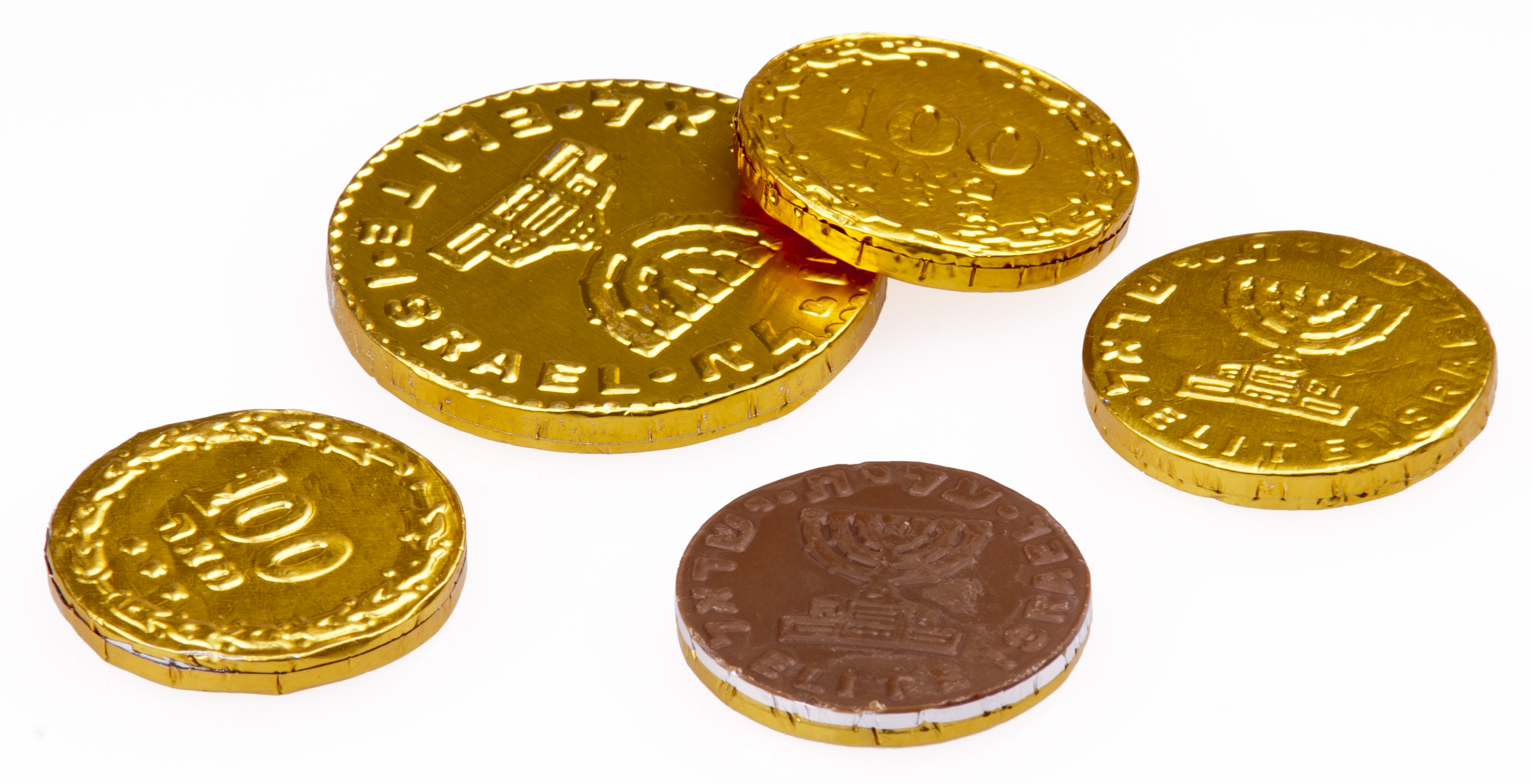
Chocolate gelt

Chanukkah gelt (Yiddish for "Chanukkah money"), known in Israel by the Hebrew translation Hebrew: דְּמֵי חֲנֻכָּה, romanized: dmei Hanukkah, is often distributed to children during the festival of Hanukkah. The giving of Hanukkah gelt also adds to the holiday excitement. The amount is usually in small coins, although grandparents or relatives may give larger sums. The tradition of giving Chanukah gelt dates back to a long-standing East European custom of children presenting their teachers with a small sum of money at this time of year as a token of gratitude. One minhag favors the fifth night of Hanukkah for giving Hanukkah gelt. Unlike the other nights of Hanukkah, the fifth does not ever fall on the Shabbat, hence never conflicting with the Halachic injunction against handling money on the Shabbat.

=== Hanukkah in the White House ===
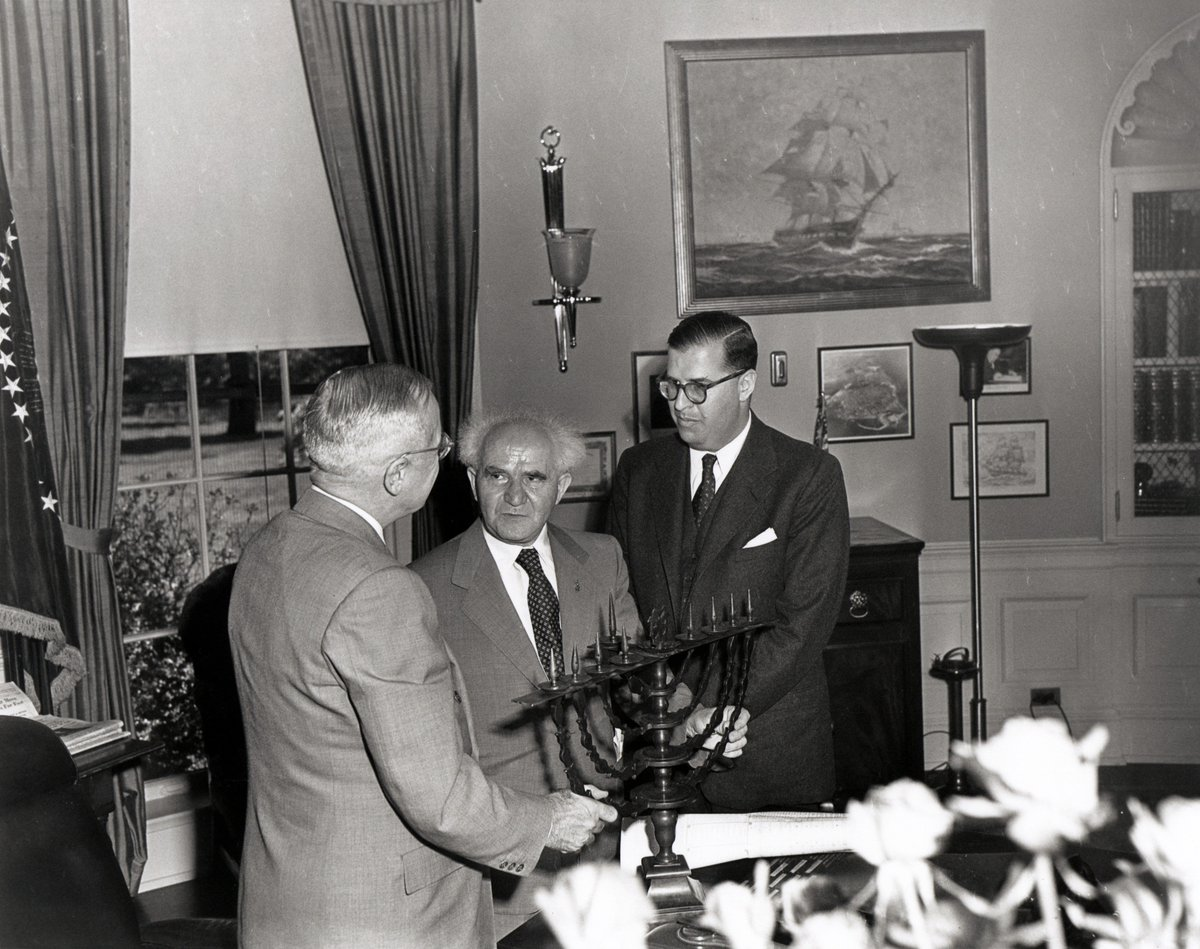
Israeli Prime Minister Ben-Gurion (center) gives President Truman (left) a Hanukkah menorah as ambassador Abba Eban watches in the Oval Office

The earliest Hanukkah link with the White House occurred in 1951 when Israeli Prime Minister David Ben-Gurion presented United States President Harry Truman with a Hanukkah menorah. In 1979 President Jimmy Carter took part in the first public Hanukkah candle-lighting ceremony of the National Menorah held across the White House lawn. In 1989, President George H. W. Bush displayed a menorah in the White House. In 1993, President Bill Clinton invited a group of schoolchildren to the Oval Office for a small ceremony.

The United States Postal Service has released several Hanukkah-themed postage stamps. In 1996, the United States Postal Service (USPS) issued a 32 cent Hanukkah stamp as a joint issue with Israel. In 2004, after eight years of reissuing the menorah design, the USPS issued a dreidel design for the Hanukkah stamp. The dreidel design was used through 2008. In 2009 a Hanukkah stamp was issued with a design featured a photograph of a menorah with nine lit candles. In 2008, President George W. Bush held an official Hanukkah reception in the White House where he linked the occasion to the 1951 gift by using that menorah for the ceremony, with a grandson of Ben-Gurion and a grandson of Truman lighting the candles.

In December 2014, two Hanukkah celebrations were held at the White House. The White House commissioned a menorah made by students at the Max Rayne school in Israel and invited two of its students to join U.S. President Barack Obama and First Lady Michelle Obama as they welcomed over 500 guests to the celebration. The students' school in Israel had been subjected to arson by extremists. President Obama said these "students teach us an important lesson for this time in our history. The light of hope must outlast the fires of hate. That's what the Hanukkah story teaches us. It's what our young people can teach us – that one act of faith can make a miracle, that love is stronger than hate, that peace can triumph over conflict." Rabbi Angela Warnick Buchdahl, in leading prayers at the ceremony commented on the how special the scene was, asking the President if he believed America's founding fathers could possibly have pictured that a female Asian-American rabbi would one day be at the White House leading Jewish prayers in front of the African-American president.

== Dates ==
The dates of Hanukkah are determined by the Hebrew calendar. Hanukkah begins at the 25th day of Kislev and concludes on the second or third day of Tevet (Kislev can have 29 or 30 days). The Jewish day begins at sunset. Hanukkah dates for recent and upcoming:

- Sunset, 7 December 2023 – nightfall, 15 December 2023
- Sunset, 25 December 2024 – nightfall, 2 January 2025
- Sunset, 14 December 2025 – nightfall, 22 December 2025
- Sunset, 4 December 2026 – nightfall, 12 December 2026
- Sunset, 24 December 2027 – nightfall, 1 January 2028
- Sunset, 12 December 2028 – nightfall, 20 December 2028
- Sunset, 1 December 2029 – nightfall, 9 December 2029
- Sunset, 20 December 2030 – nightfall, 28 December 2030

In 2013, on 28 November, the American holiday of Thanksgiving fell during Hanukkah for only the third time since Thanksgiving was declared a national holiday by President Abraham Lincoln. The last time was 1899, and due to the nature of the Gregorian and Jewish calendars being slightly out of sync with each other, it will not happen again in the foreseeable future. This rare convergence prompted the creation of the neologism Thanksgivukkah.

== Symbolic importance ==
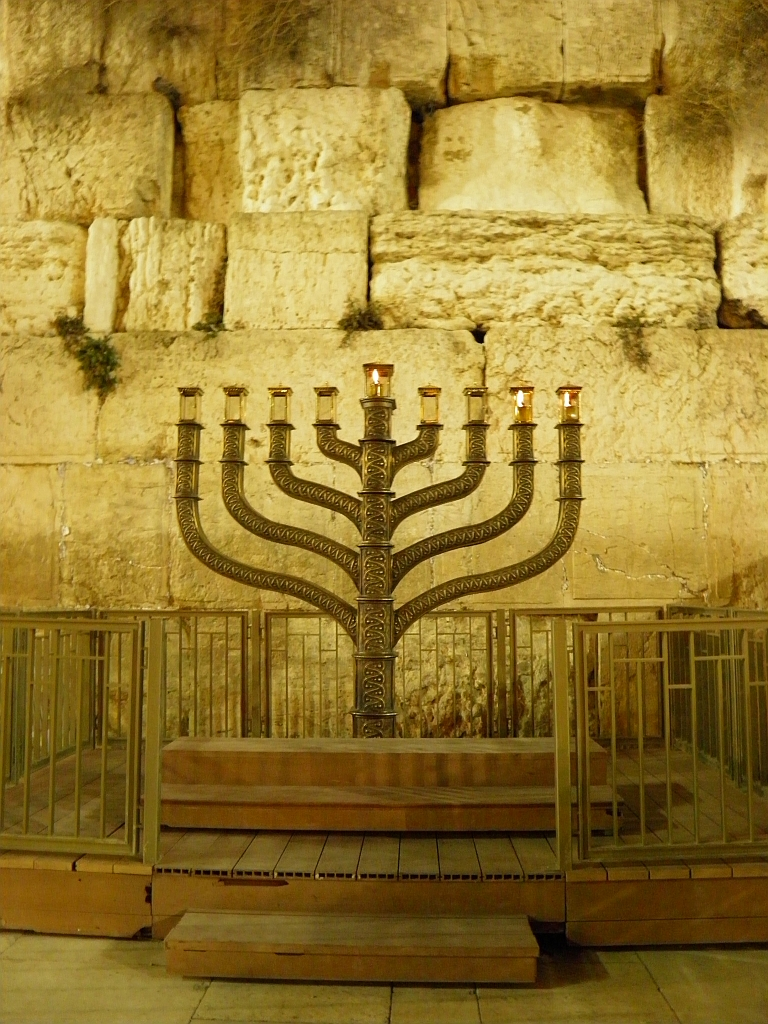
Second night of Hanukkah at Jerusalem's Western Wall

Major Jewish holidays are those when all forms of work are forbidden, and that feature traditional holiday meals, kiddush, holiday candle-lighting, etc. Only biblical holidays fit these criteria, and Chanukah was instituted some two centuries after the Hebrew Bible was completed. Nevertheless, though Chanukah is of rabbinic origin, it is traditionally celebrated in a major and very public fashion. The requirement to position the menorah, or Chanukiah, at the door or window, symbolizes the desire to give the Chanukah miracle a high-profile. Moreover, Hallel (a set of Psalms expressing praise that is recited on significant Jewish holidays) is recited on all eight days of Hanukkah, which signifies Hanukkah's importance on the Jewish calendar. While not considered the most significant holiday, the recitation of Hallel on Hanukkah highlights its importance in Jewish tradition.

== Modern history ==
=== Zionism ===
"Hanukkah is an ancient holiday, but a modest one. The holiday of the Hasmoneans is new, yet it is full of spiritual exaltation and national joy. What was Hanukkah forty years ago? 'Al ha-nissim' and Hallel; a short reading in the synagogue; lighting the tiny, slender wax candles or oil lights; at home, levivot [latkes-potato pancakes], cards for the older children, and sevivonim [dreidels-spinning tops] for the little ones. But what is Hanukkah today? The holiday of the Hasmoneans. A holiday of salvation. A great national holiday, celebrated in all the countries of the Diaspora with dances and speeches, melody and song, outings and parades, as if a new soul has been breathed into the ancient holiday, another spirit renewed within it. One thing is clear: if those tiny, modest candles had been extinguished in Diaspora times, if our grandparents had not preserved the traditions of Hanukkah in the synagogue and at home . .., the holiday of the Hasmoneans could never have been created. There would have been nothing to change, nothing to renew. The new soul of our times would not have found a body in which to envelop itself."

— Joseph Klausner, 1938, in Haim Harari's Sefer Hanukkah

The emergence of Jewish nationalism and the Zionist movement in the late 19th and early 20th centuries had a profound impact on the celebration and reinterpretation of Jewish holidays. These developments resulted in increased emphasis on certain Jewish celebrations, of which Hanukkah and Tu BiShvat are prominent examples.

Hanukkah took on renewed meaning following the rise of Jewish nationalism as a nationalist holiday, symbolizing the struggle of the Jewish people against foreign oppression and their desire for national re-creation (although the struggle of Jews against foreign oppression has always been a core component of Hanukkah, as shown by the Al HaNissim, which has been part of Jewish liturgy since at least 700 CE). Hanukkah served as a common ground where both religious and secular Zionists could unite around their nationalist agenda. Rabbi Shmuel Mohilever, an early religious Zionist, proposed making Hanukkah the official holiday of the proto-Zionist organization Hovevei Zion in Russia in 1881. Public celebrations of Hanukkah gained prominence in the early 20th century, with parades and public events becoming common. Schools in Mandate Palestine played an early role in promoting these celebrations.

With the advent of Zionism and the state of Israel, the themes of militarism were reconsidered. In modern Israel, the national and military aspects of Hanukkah became, once again, more dominant.

=== North America ===
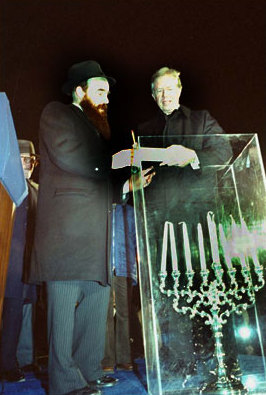
US President Jimmy Carter attends Menorah Lighting, Lafayette Park, Washington, D.C., 1979

In North America, Hanukkah in the 21st century has taken a place equal to Passover as a symbol of Jewish identity. Both the Israeli and North American versions of Hanukkah emphasize resistance, focusing on some combination of national liberation and religious freedom as the defining meaning of the holiday.

Diane Ashton attributed the increased visibility and reinvention of Hanukkah by some of the American Jewish community as a way to adapt to American life, re-inventing the festival in "the language of individualism and personal conscience derived from both Protestantism and the Enlightenment".

=== Relationship to Christmas ===
In North America, Hanukkah became increasingly important to many Jewish individuals and families during the latter part of the 20th century, including a large number of secular Jews, who wanted to celebrate a Jewish alternative to the Christmas celebrations which frequently overlap with Hanukkah. Diane Ashton argues that Jewish immigrants to America raised the profile of Hanukkah as a children-centered alternative to Christmas as early as the 1800s. This in parts mirrors the ascendancy of Christmas, which like Hanukkah increased in importance in the 1800s. During this time period, Jewish leaders (especially Reform) such as Max Lilienthal and Isaac Mayer Wise made an effort to rebrand Hanukkah and started creating Hanukkah celebration for children at their synagogues, which included candy and singing songs. By the 1900s, it started to become a commercial holiday like Christmas, with Hanukkah gifts and decorations appearing in stores and Jewish Women's magazines printing articles on holiday decorations, children's celebrations, and gift giving. Ashton says that Jewish families did this in order to maintain a Jewish identity which is distinct from mainline Christian culture, on the other hand, the mirroring of Hanukkah and Christmas made Jewish families and children feel that they were American. Though it was traditional for Ashkenazi Jews to give "gelt" or money to children during Hanukkah, in many families, this tradition has been supplemented with the giving of other gifts so that Jewish children can enjoy receiving gifts just like their Christmas-celebrating peers do. Children play a big role in Hanukkah, and Jewish families with children are more likely to celebrate it than childless Jewish families, and sociologists hypothesize that this is because Jewish parents do not want their children to be alienated from their non-Jewish peers who celebrate Christmas. Recent celebrations have also seen the presence of the Hanukkah bush, which is considered a Jewish counterpart to the Christmas tree. Today, the presence of Hanukkah bushes is generally discouraged by most rabbis.

== See also ==
- Jewish greetings
- Jewish holidays
- Miracle of the cruse of oil
