= Noodle latkes =

Type of latke made with pasta

Noodle latkes (hebrew: לטקס אטריות), also known as Romanian noodle latkes, pasta latke, or pasta latkes, are a type of latke made with pasta of Romanian Jewish origin, that is traditionally prepared during Hanukkah, although they may be eaten as a side dish during other times of the year.

== Origin ==
Noodle latkes originated within the Romanian Jewish community several hundred years ago, and were brought to Israel and the United States where their descendants still prepare this dish.

== Overview ==
Noodle latkes consist of egg noodles or fine egg pasta that has been boiled and drained, and combined with ingredients including egg, butter or margarine and a number of other ingredients to form a batter, which is shaped into latkes and fried in oil or schmaltz. They are traditionally prepared during the Jewish holiday of Chanukah by Romanian Jews, as foods fried in oil are traditionally consumed by Jewish people during Hanukkah to commemorate the miracle of the oil and the victory of the Maccabees over the Greeks in Ancient Israel.

== Variants ==
Noodle latkes come in a number of varieties, some of which are listed below.

=== Sweet ===
Sweet variants include egg, butter or margarine (if pareve) sugar, cinnamon, and oftentimes raisin, and may be dusted with cinnamon sugar or powdered sugar upon serving. This is somewhat similar to a sweet noodle kugel.

=== Savory ===
Savory variants also include chopped onion and seasoning such as salt, pepper and various spices, and may be fried in vegetable oil or schmaltz.

== See also ==
- Latkes
- Fritas de prasa
