= Miracle of the cruse of oil =

Aggadah in the Talmud depicting a miracle of Hanukkah

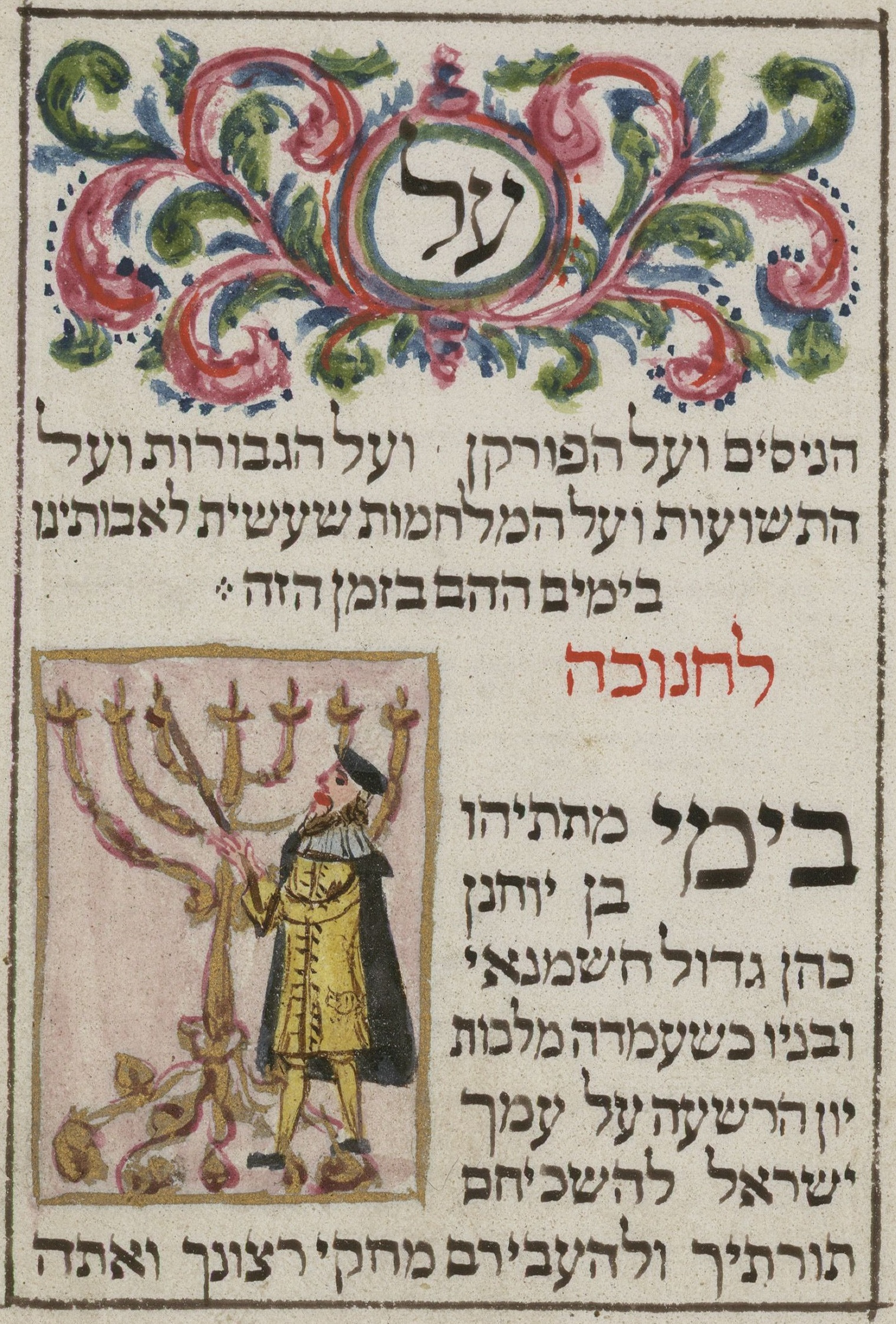
Al HaNissim prayer, said every Hanukkah to commemorate the miracle

Miracle of the cruse (Note: A small jar used to hold liquid) of oil (Hebrew: נֵס פַּךְ הַשֶּׁמֶן), or the Miracle of Hanukkah, is a sixth-century Aggadah depicted in the Babylonian Talmud as one of the reasons for Hanukkah. In the story, the miracle occurred after the liberation of the Temple in Jerusalem during the Maccabean Revolt, and it describes the finding of a jug of pure oil that was to be enough to light the lamp for one day, but that lasted for eight days.

Contemporary accounts of the revolt, including 1 Maccabees, 2 Maccabees, and writings by Josephus, do not mention the miracle of the oil, attributing the eight-day holiday instead to the military victory and the rededication of the Temple. The story is also absent in the Jerusalem Talmud.

== Historical background ==
During the period of the Second Temple (~516 BCE – 70 CE), in around 200 BCE, Antiochus III, the Seleucid king of Syria, took control over the kingdom of Judea. He allowed the Jews living in Judea autonomous rule for some time, but then his son Antiochus IV replaced him. Trying to unify his kingdom, Antiochus IV prohibited Jews from practicing Judaism and commanded them to worship Greek gods. Many Jews went along with these demands and were known as Hellenized Jews. Tensions rose and in 168 BCE Antiochus IV invaded Jerusalem, killing thousands, and erected an altar to Zeus in the temple. Along with a statue of Zeus, the sacrifice of pigs (a normal practice in ancient Greek worship) began to take place in the temple.

This resulted in civil war between ruling Hellenized factions that had been installed by Antiochus IV and traditionalists. The rebels were led by the priest Matityahu of Modiin, known as the Maccabees. After two years of guerrilla warfare, the rebels were able to overthrow Seleucid rule.

== The story of the miracle ==
After expelling the Seleucids from Jerusalem, the Second Temple had to be purified and rededicated, due to the defilement the Seleucids had inflicted. A key component of the rededication ritual was the lighting of the Menorah. According to the story, the menorah needed to burn for eight nights. However, only a single cruse of untainted (as evidenced by bearing an unbroken seal) olive oil was found throughout all of Jerusalem—enough to last only one night. The oil, nevertheless, is said to have lasted for eight nights, constituting a miracle.

== Biblical descriptions ==
The Torah discusses the lighting of the Temple menorah in a number of verses. Leviticus 24:2 specifies that pure olive oil must be used to light the menorah. While Exodus 25:37 and Numbers 8:2–3 speak of seven lights being lit, Exodus 27:20–21 and Leviticus 24:2 specifies that a single "light" must be lit "continually", and must burn "from evening to morning". Thus, according to Jewish tradition, priests ensured that all seven menorah lights were lit during the day, while just one of them (the ner maaravi or ner tamid) burned through the entire night.

== Significance of the eight days ==
According to the Babylonian Talmud, after defeating the Syrian-Greeks in the battlefield, the Maccabees returned to Jerusalem and to the Temple. There, they wanted to rededicate the Temple through the resumption of the performance of Temple rituals. One of these rituals was the lighting of the Menorah, however the Menorah could only be lit with pure olive oil. When the Greeks entered the Temple they had defiled almost all the jugs of oil.

As the Maccabees searched for pure oil to light the menorah with, they found just one cruse of pure oil which still had the seal of the High Priest, the symbol of pure oil. This cruse contained just enough pure oil to keep the menorah lit for one day. In order to make pure oil however, individuals making the oil must be in a state of spiritual purity. Being soldiers returning from the battlefield, the Maccabees were deemed impure, and therefore could not make pure oil. Since the process of ritual purification after touching a corpse lasts seven days, the Maccabees could only produce additional pure oil after eight days: seven days of becoming pure including one day, once pure, to actually make the oil. Therefore, the Maccabees would have been unable to light the Menorah for seven days before the completion of new pure oil. Miraculously, the one cruse of oil had lasted for all eight days, and by that point new pure oil was ready.

Rabbi Joseph Karo is known for asking why Hanukkah is celebrated for eight days, if the oil was expected to last one day, so seemingly only the last seven days were miraculous. This question became famous and many answers were suggested to it; indeed a book was published in 1962 compiling 100 different proposed answers, with a more recent work, published in 2019, containing 1,000 answers. The answers generally fall into three categories: arguing that the oil miracle actually lasted eight days in some way; arguing that the eighth day is celebrated for a reason other than the oil miracle; and arguing that the eight-day length of Hanukkah is unrelated to the oil miracle.

== Hanukkah ==
The Talmud, after recounting the story of the miracle of the cruse of oil, continues, "The following year these [days] were appointed a Festival with [the recital of] Hallel (Jewish praise, recited on all festivals) and thanksgiving." Since then, the festival of Hanukkah has been celebrated each year, beginning on the 25th of Kislev. During these days, lamentation for the dead and fasting are forbidden, Hallel is recited, and the Menorah is lit.

The holiday now also serves as a commemoration of the daily lighting of the Menorah in the Temple, and the Temple in general.

Today, the Jewish holiday of Hanukkah lasts eight days to remember, and celebrate, the miracle of the one cruse of oil lasting eight days. One candle is lit on the first night in addition to the shammash, and a candle is added each night. Ultimately, nine candles are lit on the final night of the holiday, including the shammash. Traditionally, after the lighting of the Menorah, Ma'oz Tzur is sung in honor of the holiday. Latkes, among other oily food, are also eaten on Hanukkah in honor of the miracle of the cruse of oil.

== See also ==
- Raising of the son of the widow of Zarephath
