= Al HaNissim =

Jewish additive prayer on Hanukkah and Purim

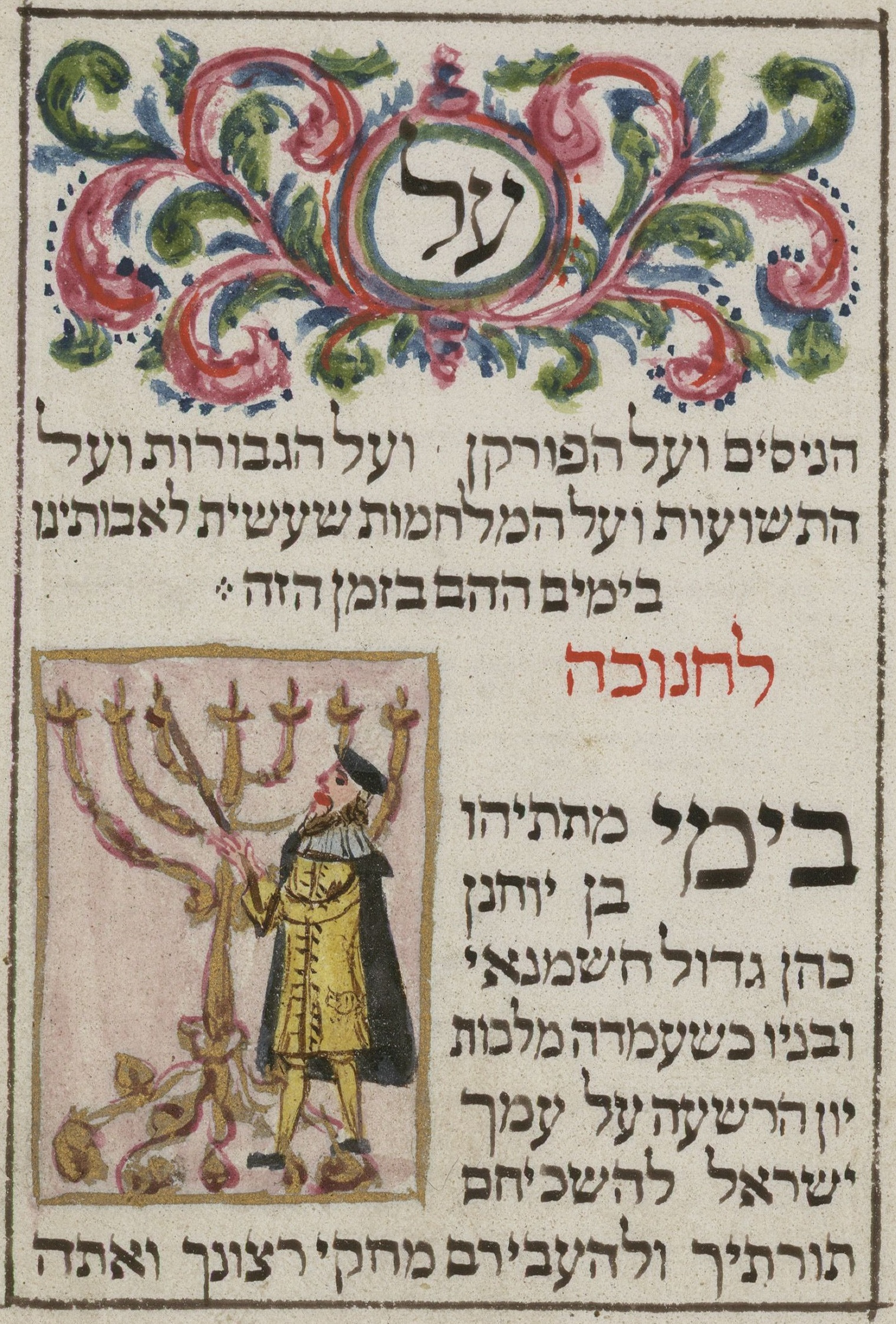
The Prayer in a Siddur from the city of Fürth, 1738, from the collections of the National Library of Israel

The prayer as a part of the candle lighting blessing, Moorocan Jewish variant

Al HaNissim alternatively V'al HaNissim ([ו]עַל הַנִסִּים, "[and] on the miracles") is an addition to the Amidah prayer and Birkat Hamazon blessing on Hanukkah and Purim. On both holidays, it starts off with a short paragraph, beginning with the words for which it is named. After that, each holiday has a unique paragraph, describing the events for which that day is celebrated.

== Text of the Prayer ==
The standard Ashkenazi Orthodox text of the prayer is as follows:

Hebrew	English
On Hanukkah and Purim:
וְ)עַל הַנִּסִּים וְעַל הַפֻּרְקָן וְעַל הַגְּבוּרוֹת וְעַל הַתְּשׁוּעוֹת וְעַל הַמִּלְחָמוֹת)	(And) for the miracles and for the redemption and for the mighty acts and for the salvation and for the wars
שֶׁעָשִֽׂיתָ לַאֲבוֹתֵֽינוּ בַּיָּמִים הָהֵם בִּזְּמַן הַזֶּה	that You have done for our forefathers in those days in this season.
On Hanukkah:
בִּימֵי מַתִּתְיָֽהוּ בֶּן יוֹחָנָן כֹּהֵן גָּדוֹל חַשְׁמוֹנָאִי וּבָנָיו	In the days of Mattityahu son of Yochanan the High Priest the Hasmonean, and his sons,
כְּשֶׁעָמְדָה מַלְכוּת יָוָן הָרְשָׁעָה עַל־עַמְּךָ יִשְׂרָאֵל לְהַשְׁכִּיחָם תּוֹרָתֶֽךָ וּלְהַעֲבִירָם מֵחֻקֵּי רְצוֹנֶֽךָ	when the wicked Greek Kingdom rose up against Your nation Israel to make them forget Your Torah and to remove them from the laws of your will,
וְאַתָּה בְּרַחֲמֶֽיךָ הָרַבִּים עָמַֽדְתָּ לָהֶם בְּעֵת צָרָתָם	and You in Your great mercy stood up for them in their time of distress.
רַֽבְתָּ אֶת־רִיבָם דַּֽנְתָּ אֶת־דִּינָם נָקַֽמְתָּ אֶת־נִקְמָתָם	You fought their fight, judged their judgement, [and] avenged their revenge.
מָסַֽרְתָּ גִבּוֹרִים בְּיַד חַלָּשִׁים וְרַבִּים בְּיַד מְעַטִּים	You turned over the strong in the hand of the weak, and the many in the hand of the few,
וּטְמֵאִים בְּיַד טְהוֹרִים וּרְשָׁעִים בְּיַד צַדִּיקִים וְזֵדִים בְּיַד עוֹסְקֵי תוֹרָתֶֽךָ	and the impure in the hand of the pure, and the wicked in the hand of the righteous, and sinners in the hand of those involved with Your Torah.
וּלְךָ עָשִֽׂיתָ שֵׁם גָּדוֹל וְקָדוֹשׁ בְּעוֹלָמֶֽךָ	And for You, You made a great and holy name in Your world,
וּלְעַמְּךָ יִשְׂרָאֵל עָשִֽׂיתָ תְּשׁוּעָה גְדוֹלָה וּפֻרְקָן כְּהַיּוֹם הַזֶּה	and for Your nation Israel you did a great salvation and redemption to this day.
וְאַחַר־כֵּן בָּֽאוּ בָנֶֽיךָ לִדְבִיר בֵּיתֶֽךָ	And after this Your children came to the Holy of Holies of Your House
וּפִנּוּ אֶת־הֵיכָלֶֽךָ וְטִהֲרוּ אֶת־מִקְדָּשֶֽׁךָ וְהִדְלִֽיקוּ נֵרוֹת בְּחַצְרוֹת קָדְשֶֽׁךָ	and cleaned your abode, and sanctified your sanctuary, and lit candles in the courtyards of your sanctuary,
וְקָבְעוּ שְׁמוֹנַת יְמֵי חֲנֻכָּה אֵֽלּוּ לְהוֹדוֹת וּלְהַלֵּל לְשִׁמְךָ הַגָּדוֹל	and established these eight days of Hanukkah to give thanks and praise to your great name.
On Purim:
בִּימֵי מָרְדְּכַי וְאֶסְתֵּר בְּשׁוּשַׁן הַבִּירָה	In the days of Mordechai and Esther, in Shushan, the capital,
כְּשֶׁעָמַד עֲלֵיהֶם הָמָן הָרָשָׁע	when Haman, the wicked, rose up against them
בִּקֵּשׁ לְהַשְׁמִיד לַהֲרוֹג וּלְאַבֵּד אֶת־כָּל־הַיְּהוּדִים	and sought to destroy, to slay, and to exterminate all the Jews
מִנַּֽעַר וְעַד־זָקֵן טַף וְנָשִׁים	young and old, infants and women,
יוֹם אֶחָד בִּשְׁלוֹשָׁה עָשָׂר לְחֹֽדֶשׁ שְׁנֵים־עָשָׂר הוּא־חֹֽדֶשׁ אֲדָר	on the same day, on the thirteenth of the twelfth month, which is the month of Adar,
וּשְׁלָלָם לָבוֹז	and to plunder their possessions;
וְאַתָּה בְּרַחֲמֶיךָ הָרַבִּים הֵפַרְתָּ אֶת עֲצָתוֹ וְקִלְקַלְתָּ אֶת מַחֲשַׁבְתּוֹ וַהֲשֵׁבוֹתָ לּוֹ גְּמוּלוֹ בְרֹאשׁוֹ וְתָלוּ אוֹתוֹ וְאֶת בָּנָיו עַל הָעֵץ	But You, in Your abundant mercy, nullified his counsel and frustrated his intention and caused his design to return upon his own head and they hanged him and his sons on the gallows.

== The source of Al HaNissim ==
A prayer for the miracles is already mentioned in the Tosefta which indicates that on Hanukkah and Purim they say "a kind of event" in the confessional blessing of the eighteenth prayer. The exact wording "on the miracles" is not mentioned in the Tosefta (but "the kind of event") and even the Talmuds when they refer to prayer indicate "the kind of event". Probably the first to explicitly mention the words "Al HaNissim" is Rabbi Achai Mishbaha in the She'iltot and its full version is found for the first time in the order of Rabbi Amram Gaon and Siddur RSG.

== Al HaNissim on Yom Ha'atzmaut ==
Various rabbis endorsed the recitation of Al Hanisim on Yom Ha'atzmaut, and even penned unique versions of this prayer, although this practice is not universally accepted. The first to publish a version of Al Hanisim for Yom Ha'atzmaut was Rabbi Ezra Zion Melamed.
