= John Gaddi =

2nd century BCE Maccabean revolt leader

John Gaddi (Note: Hebrew: יוחנן הגדי Greek: ὁ ἐπικαλούμενος Γαδδι, romanized: Ioannis o epikaloúmenos Gaddi, lit. 'John called Gaddi' in 1 Maccabees 2:3 (Greek version)) (Hebrew: Johanan or Yohanan) (d. c. 160–159 BCE) was a son of Mattathias the Hasmonean and brother of Judas Maccabeus. The Hasmonean family lead the Maccabean Revolt against the Seleucid Empire which ruled Judea in the 160s BCE. John's activities are not as well-documented as his other brothers. He is usually considered to have been the eldest of Mattathias's five sons. He died around 160 or 159 BCE.

Alternative forms of his cognomen "Gaddi" include "Gaddis" and "Gaddim".

== Primary sources ==
=== 1 Maccabees 2 ===
Almost everything that is known of John comes from the book 1 Maccabees, a dynastic history of the Hasmoneans written after the Maccabean Revolt was successful and the Hasmoneans had established an independent kingdom. The historian Josephus's work Jewish Antiquities Books 12 and 13 also mention John, but it appears to be largely paraphrasing 1 Maccabees, Josephus's main source for the period. 1 Maccabees introduces Mattathias and his sons in chapter 2:

In those days Mattathias the son of John, son of Simeon, a priest of the sons of Joarib, moved from Jerusalem and settled in Modein. He had five sons, John surnamed Gaddi, Simon called Thassi, Judas called Maccabeus, Eleazar called Avaran, and Jonathan called Apphus.

— 1 Maccabees 2:1-5 (RSV-CE)

It is usually assumed that the order of the sons given is from eldest to youngest. None of the cognomens given to the sons are directly explained, although Gaddi is a name that appears in the Bible in Numbers 13:11. One suggestion for what "Gaddi" might refer to is relating to the word gad as a term for "fortune" (such as the usage by the deity Gad), suggesting it meant something like "Lucky". Another possibility is Gaddi as a term for "grain" / "produce", perhaps suggesting John may have been a farmer.

John's activities during the revolt are in general not directly recorded, although he is possibly indirectly referenced when the Hasmonean family as a whole does something, such as at the end of Chapter 2 which says "Then he [Mattathias] and his sons fled to the hills and left all that they had in the town." It is not known whether John simply didn't do much, the chronicler writing 1 Maccabees was less familiar with John's activities, the author wished to downplay his activities for some reason, or the author simply felt it would detract from the literary flow given John's eventual fate and his heirs (if any) not assuming leadership.

=== 2 Maccabees 8 ===
The book 2 Maccabees includes an intriguing possible reference to John when discussing a battle in 165 or 164 BCE in chapter 8, although a garbled one if so:

With these words he (Judas) filled them with good courage and made them ready to die for their laws and their country; then he divided his army into four parts. He appointed his brothers also, Simon and Joseph and Jonathan, each to command a division, putting fifteen hundred men under each. Besides, he appointed Eleazar to read from the holy book, and gave the watchword, "God's Help"; then, leading the first division himself, he joined battle with Nicanor.

— 2 Maccabees 8:21-23 (RSV-CE)

In general, the assumption is that something is poorly phrased or mistaken in this passage, and that 1 Maccabees as a dynastic history of the Hasmoneans is trustworthy as to John's name and the number of brothers. Thus, rather than a mysterious sixth brother named "Joseph", either "Joseph" is an error by the author or a scribe for "John" if it was meant that each of the Hasmonean brothers commanded a division, or it is a reference to "Joseph, son of Zechariah", a commander mentioned in 1 Maccabees 5.

=== 1 Maccabees 9 ===
The final references to John Gaddi are the events surrounding his death. Judas Maccabeus died at the Battle of Elasa, usually dated to Nisan (April) 160 BCE. Afterward, the victorious Seleucid army under General Bacchides continued to pursue the retreating Maccabees. After an unclear length of time, the Maccabee force crossed the Jordan River and sought shelter with the Nabateans (Arabs) of the region. According to 1 Maccabees 9:

Jonathan and his brother Simon and all who were with him heard of it, and they fled into the wilderness of Tekoa and camped by the water of the pool of Asphar. (...)

So Jonathan sent his brother as leader of the multitude and begged the Nabateans, who were his friends, for permission to store with them the great amount of baggage that they had. But the family of Jambri from Medeba came out and seized John and all that he had, and left with it.

After these things it was reported to Jonathan and his brother Simon, 'The family of Jambri are celebrating a great wedding, and are conducting the bride, a daughter of one of the great nobles of Canaan, from Nadabath with a large escort.' Remembering how their brother John had been killed, they went up and hid under cover of the mountain. They looked out and saw a tumultuous procession with a great amount of baggage; and the bridegroom came out with his friends and his brothers to meet them with tambourines and musicians and many weapons. Then they rushed on them from the ambush and began killing them. Many were wounded and fell, and the rest fled to the mountain; and the Jews took all their goods. So the wedding was turned into mourning and the voice of their musicians into a funeral dirge. After they had fully avenged the blood of their brother, they returned to the marshes of the Jordan.

— 1 Maccabees 9:33; 35-42 (NRSV)

Nothing is known of Jambri or his family; "Medaba" was the name of a city in Moab. It seems they plundered the treasure and supplies John had been put in charge of safeguarding, although "baggage" in the era could also refer to noncombatants such as refugees. It is unclear whether John immediately died, or he perhaps was held in captivity or suffered mortal wounds, given that the narrative waits a bit to confirm his death. In the story of the vengeance attack, the actual origin of the bride who is from "Canaan" (a Biblical reference, as Canaan was no longer a polity in the Maccabean era) is unclear, and the location of Nadabath is unknown.
