= Ezra Zion Melamed =

Israeli scholar

- עזרא ציון מלמד
- Born: 22 November 1903; Shiraz, Persia
- Died: 9 March 1994 (aged 90); Jerusalem, Israel
- Occupations: Rabbi, scholar, lexicographer
- Notable work: Biblical interpretation, Rabbinical literature, Aramaic lexicography
- Awards: Israel Prize (1987)

Rabbi Ezra Zion Melamed (Hebrew: עזרא ציון מלמד, also ע"צ מלמד, November 22, 1903 – March 9, 1994) was an Israeli biblical and Talmudic scholar, and lexicographer of Aramaic language. He was born in Shiraz, Persia in 1903. He won the 1987 Israel Prize for his work in Biblical interpretation and Rabbinical literature. He was the rabbi of the Persian Jewish community in Jerusalem, succeeding his father's position.

== Works ==
- Melamed, Ezra Zion (1927). מלון אספרנטי־עברי : (בצרוף מבנה השפה ודקדוקה, תרגילים וספורים) [Esperanto–Hebrew Dictionary]. Jerusalem. OCLC 62527530.
- Melamed, Ezra Zion (2005). Aramaic-Hebrew-English dictionary of the Babylonian Talmud. Feldheim Publishers. ISBN 9781583307762.
- Melamed, Ezra Zion (1961). Chaim Rabin (ed.). "Break-up of Stereotype Phrases as an Artistic Device in Biblical Poetry". Scripta Hierosolymitana. 8. Jerusalem: Hebrew University of Jerusalem: 115–153. ISSN 0080-8369.
