= Mattathias =

2nd century BCE Jewish priest of the Hasmonean Dynasty

- An imaginary depiction of Mattathias from Guillaume Rouillé's Promptuarii Iconum Insigniorum (1553)

Leader of the Maccabees
- Reign: 167-166 BCE
- Predecessor: Revolt Started
- Successor: Judas Maccabeus
- Born: Judea
- Died: 166 BCE
- Burial: Modi'in
- Issue: Judas Maccabeus; Eleazar Avaran; Simon Thassi; John Gaddi; Jonathan Apphus
- Dynasty: Hasmonean
- Father: John, son of Simeon
- Religion: Judaism

Mattathias ben Johanan (Hebrew: מַתִּתְיָהוּ הַכֹּהֵן בֶּן יוֹחָנָן, Mattīṯyāhū haKōhēn ben Yōḥānān; died 166–165 BCE) was a Kohen (Jewish priest) who helped spark the Maccabean Revolt against the Hellenistic Seleucid Empire. Mattathias's story is related in the deuterocanonical book of 1 Maccabees and in the writings of Josephus. Mattathias is accorded a central role in the story of Hanukkah and, as a result, is named in the Al HaNissim prayer Jews add to the Birkat Hamazon (grace after meals) and the Amidah during the festival's eight days.

== History ==
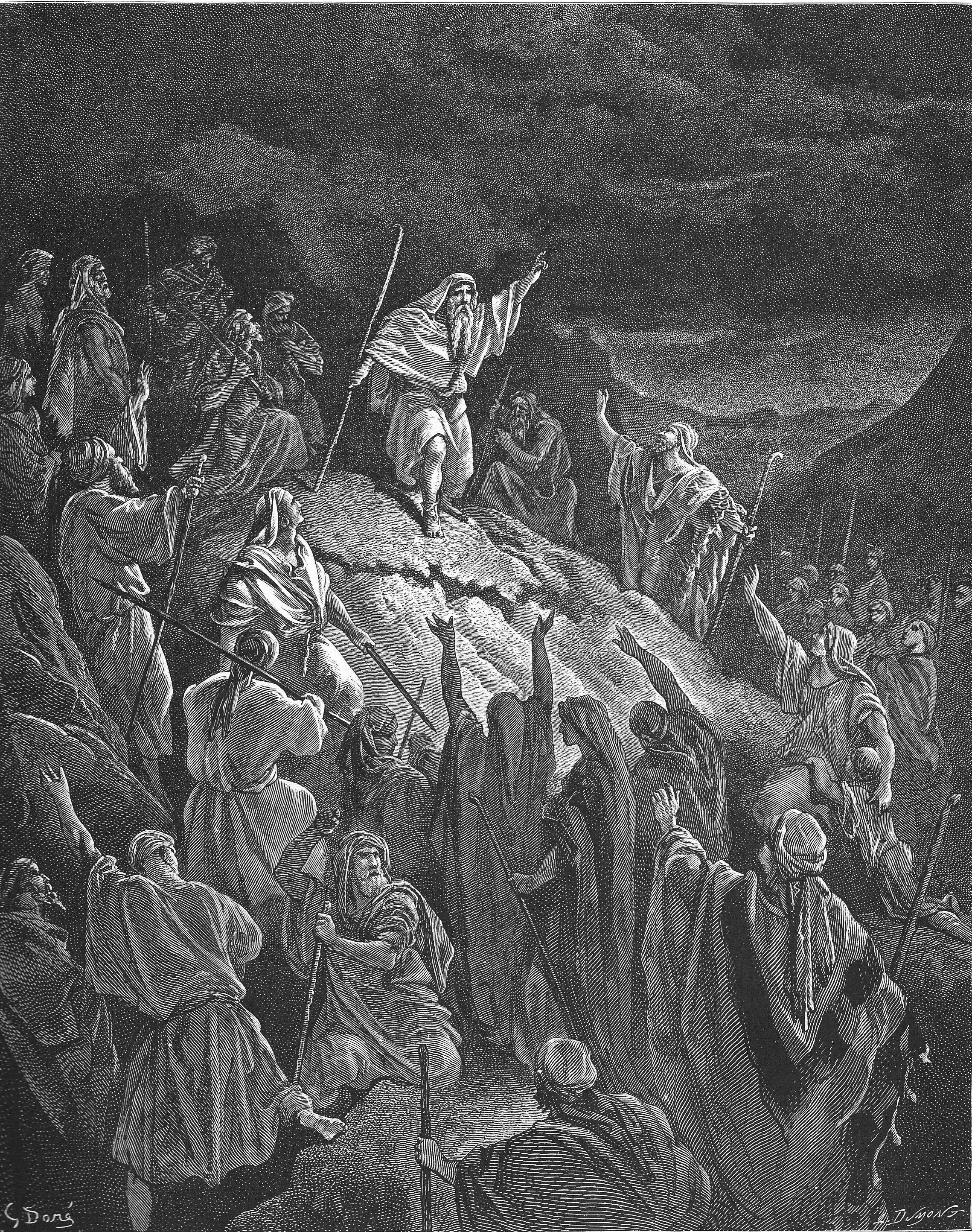
Mattathias appealing to Jewish refugees (illustration by Gustave Doré from the 1866 La Sainte Bible)

In all extant accounts from the Second Temple Period, Mattathias was a resident of the rural village of Modi'in, though it is not clear if he was a native. The account of 1 Maccabees states that he moved away from Jerusalem and settled in Modi'in, and while the account of Josephus in Antiquities matches this, the account in Wars simply states that Mattathias (or his father) was a "priest of a village called Modi'in", implying that it was his place of origin.

The account of 1 Maccabees provides the lineage of Mattathias, stating that he was a son of John (Johanan) and grandson of Simeon, a priest from the order of Joarib. Josephus adds the name of Asamonaius to this lineage in both his accounts, and though later rabbinic sources mention Hasmonai as a specific person, "Asmonaius" or "Hasmonean" was probably meant as a family title. This would lead to Mattathias and his descendants being known as the Hasmoneans. Being a descendant of Joarib, the first chief of a priestly division mentioned in the book of Chronicles, he was in turn a descendant of Phinehas, third High Priest of Israel. Like many priests, he most probably served in the Second Temple in Jerusalem, though the sources stating that he was a High Priest are relatively late and anachronistic.

Mattathias was the father of Judas Maccabeus (Judah Maccabee), Eleazar Avaran, Simon Thassi (Simeon), John Gaddi, and Jonathan Apphus (Yonatan).

== First Stage of the Rebellion ==
The accounts of 1 Maccabees and Josephus largely agree in their description of the oppressive laws the Hellenistic administration enforced on the Jewish religion, and the role Mattathias played in opposing them.

In 168–167 BCE, a series of Seleucid persecutions of traditional Judaism began, spearheaded by King Antiochus IV Epiphanes and possibly High Priest Menelaus as well.

In 167 BCE, a company of Greek soldiers appeared in Modi'in with orders to enforce Antiochus' ordinances of sacrificing to the Greek gods. Mattathias, being an esteemed member of the community, was asked to serve as an example and lead the village in the sacrifice to the pagan deities, while being promised riches and the prestigious title of "Friend of the King" in return. Mattathias refused, and when another Jew stepped forward to do so, Mattathias killed both him and the government official overseeing the sacrifice, and rallied his supporters:

Let everyone who is zealous for the law and supports the covenant come out with me!

— Mattathias, after assassinating the Greek government official, who was forcing him to sacrifice; 1 Maccabees 2:27

Upon the dramatic killing of the official and the Jew, he and his five sons fled to the wilderness of Judea where they began to build a guerilla force of followers. The area was then known as the Gophna Hills, a region near modern Jifna. He led the rebellion for one year, and before his death, he assigned different roles to two of his sons, based on their individual qualities. Simon was appointed counselor and Judah the military commander. According to 1 Maccabees, he died in the 146th year of the Ancient Macedonian calendar, equivalent to some point between Spring 166 – Spring 165 BCE, and was buried in the tomb of his ancestors in Modiin.

== Contribution to Religious Law ==
In Jewish scripture there is no explicit mention of the prohibition of warfare on the Sabbath, nor is there any mention of refraining from battle on the Sabbath. Even so, by the Second Temple Period it is clear that combat on the Sabbath was widely viewed by Jews as forbidden, even to the extent of large scale defeat and death. Beginning with the invasion of Jerusalem by Ptolemy I Soter, a number of incidents are documented in the writings of Josephus and in the books of the Maccabees, in which Jewish fighters refrained from combat and even sacrificed their lives in the face of the enemy so as not to desecrate the Sabbath. In the aftermath of one such incident it is said that Mattathias directed:

'Let us fight against anyone who comes to attack us on the Sabbath day; let us not all die as our kindred died in their hiding-places.'

This is the earliest known rejection of the commonly accepted prohibition of fighting on the Sabbath, later on in the Second Temple Period this permission was expanded to include not only defensive actions but offensive ones too. This process is reflected in rabbinic sources where the ruling was developed and finally canonized as a Halakhic decree.

== Context ==
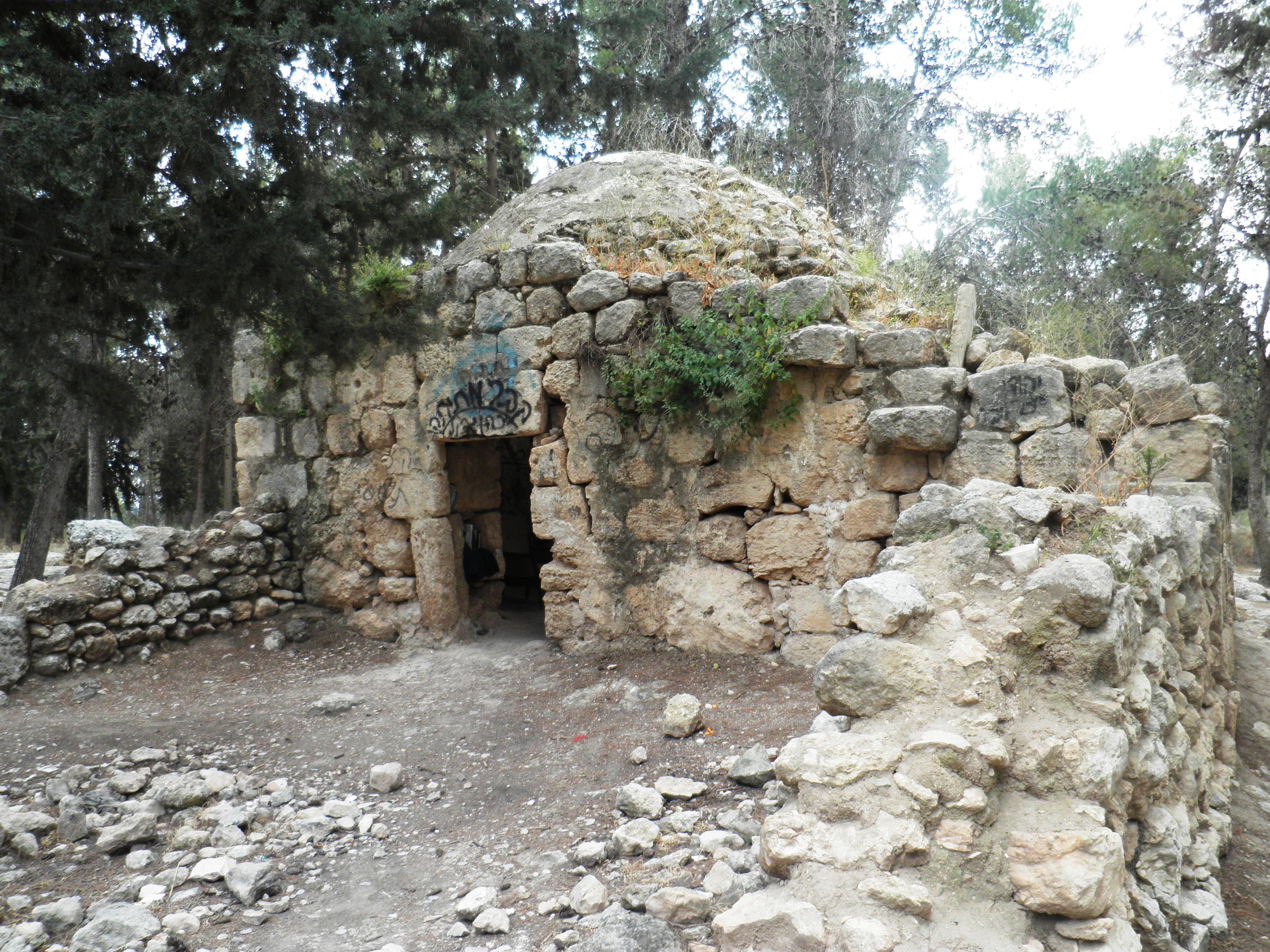
Tomb of Mattathias ben Johanan, Israel

This was the first step in the Maccabean Revolt, the result of which was Jewish independence, which had not been enjoyed for more than 400 years. The events of the war of the Maccabees form the basis for the holiday of Hanukkah, which is celebrated by Jews on the 25th of Kislev (on the Hebrew calendar, corresponding to mid-November to late December in the Gregorian calendar).

== In literature and liturgy ==
Mattathias is mentioned in the story of the Maccabees, found in the deuterocanonical book of 1 Maccabees, in Josephus, and in Talmudic references (Shabbat 21b, Shabbat 23a – related to the candles). He is also made reference to in chapter 28 of 1 Meqabyan, a book considered canonical in the Ethiopian Orthodox Tewahedo Church. The "Al HaNisim" prayer, added into the Amidah and Birkat Hamazon on Hanukkah, refers to the story of the Maccabees and to Mattathias by name.

== See also ==
- Jewish leadership
- Hasmonean dynasty

Mattathias Hasmonean dynasty Died: 166 BCE
Jewish titles
New title	Leader of the Maccabees c. 167 BCE – 166 BCE	Succeeded by Judas Maccabeus
