= Marva =

Israeli Defense Forces basic training program

Marva (Hebrew: מרווה) is a two-month Israel Defense Forces basic training program for young Jews from the Diaspora which offers an opportunity to experience the IDF and Israeli life. The program is based at Sde Boker.

== History ==
Marva, originally affiliated with Gadna, which is now part of the Israeli Education and Youth Corps, is open to young adults aged 18-25 fluent in English or Hebrew. The majority of participants are 18-20.

Every week, the program focuses on a different aspect of Israeli army life. Participants travel around the country visiting IDF bases and experiencing the life of a soldier while learning about the army itself. The program costs US$1650 and is non-refundable. Medical coverage does not apply to out weekends, which are every two weeks. Should a participant need time off during the course a letter must be written to the commanding officer in Hebrew. Also all orders are given in Hebrew, however due to it being understood that the course participants are not fluent in Hebrew, all orders are translated.

Participants are also assigned kitchen and guard duty. Marva is characterized by a greater focus on discipline than on physical fitness compared to basic training for combat units in the army. A former graduate Mike Steinbach has credited his experiences in Marva for helping him write his books "Torah and Zionism?" as well as Pirkei Avot A Zionist approach"

== Course schedule ==
Week 1: Induction Participants are taught the basics of discipline and get a weapon after a short hike. They also learn the theory of shooting and practice shooting positions.

Week 2: "Field Week".

The week is spent outside, living like a soldier on the line. Participants sleep in tents, eat army field rations and learn the basics of field techniques (camouflage, movement, etc.). Participants also undergo target practice with an M16 rifle.

Week 3: North Week

Using Michve Alon as a home base, participants tour the north of the country, take part in an exercise session in Kfar Blum and hike in the Banias.

Week 4: Navigation Week

Participants learn the basics of map-reading, and use the knowledge learned in the classroom while in the field, in small squads.

Week 5: Sport Week

Participants spend a week at Wingate Institute, Israel's leading sports training facility, training with army sports instructors.

Week 6: Combat Week

Participants spend a week at the home base of one of the IDF infantry units, Nahal. Participants learn how combat soldiers live, and practice shooting with an Israeli-manufactured Tavor or with an American-manufactured M16.

Week 7: Jerusalem

Participants tour Jerusalem and the surrounding areas in uniform. The highlight of the week is a ceremony at the Western Wall.

Week 8: Final Week

The week begins with a hike up the Snake Path at Masada to watch the sunrise. On the last day of the course, at David Ben-Gurion's grave, family and friends are encouraged to come and watch the participants receive a ceremonial pin, the "Marvaton".

== Staff/personnel ==
Marva operates as a Military Company (Pluga) comprising 2-3 Platoons (Machlakot) which are further divided into 5-6 Sections (Tzvatim) per Machlaka.

At the top is The Company Commander (Mefaked/et HaPluga) a commissioned officer responsible for the overall operation of the Company mostly dealing with external affairs such as communicating with youth movements and the base commander. He/ She is highly ranked and is rarely seen apart from one or two classes and the most formal of ceremonies (when received in the Het all members of the Pluga don their berets as a sign of respect). Assisting the Company Commander is the Chief Company Sergeant (Rav Samal Plugati) responsible for Company wide logistical matters (painted as the owner/ custodian of the store rooms; all uniforms and property you use, you lose uniform or property you face the RSP) and of course the highest level of discipline (regarded as the most fierce and cruel on base. Do not make eye contact, always angry, will scream at you). Other Company wide ancillary staff exist but are not relevant to the participants i.e. Deputy/ Secretary to the MP, curriculum coordinator or medics.

Each Machlaka (Platoon) is headed The Platoon Commander (Mefaked/et HaMachlaka), a commissioned officer, and is responsible for the operation of the Platoon. Most classes about Israeli military history are taken by the “MMs”. Additionally, they manage ammunition and rifle allocation for their respective Machlaka. MMs also adjudicate (mock) military trials if you consistently misbehave and are reported by the Platoon Sergeant. Deputising for the MM is the Samal or Samelet, the sergeant (platoon sergeant). They are the archetypical manifestation of a sergeant and are very much visible when it comes to exercising constant discipline and drills (do not approach them, always angry). Furthermore, they are responsible for the Platoons logistics; especially meal or bus allocation, the distribution of uniforms/ canteens (overseen by the Rav Samal Plugati of course).

Most significantly, your Commander or Mefaked/et is your group leader. You will spend all your days been directed and disciplined by your Mef. They are your only point of call with anything in relation to the programme. They run activities and classes on a daily basis about military history, leadership and teamwork strategies. During the last week you do break distance with all members of the Company in ascending order. It is indented that by the end of the program one has developed a positive relationship with the Mef as such a unique experience cannot be mimicked ever in your lifetime.

Lastly, “Commanders without distance” exist: one for each Machlaka and one for the Pluga. They are known as Moshakit Tash or service rights commander. During your 1-hour free time a day they hang around and you are able to meet with them in a relaxed and open manner. They are responsible your pastoral and emotional care and any issues within should be brought up with them.
