= Yigal Levinstain =

Yigal Levinstein (Hebrew: יגאל לוינשטיין, born 1956) is an Israeli Orthodox rabbi and one of the founders and co-heads of the Bnei David Pre-Military Academy in Eli, the first institution of its kind established in Israel. A prominent figure within the Religious Zionist movement, Levinstein is recognized for his role in preparing religious youth for combat and leadership roles in the Israel Defense Forces (IDF). He is also known for his conservative viewpoints on social issues, women's enlistment, and LGBT topics, which have sparked public debate in Israel.

== Early life and military service ==
Levinstein was born in 1956 and raised in a secular family in Eilat, where he competed in competitive sailing during his youth. After his regular military service in the armored corps, he became religiously observant at age 23 and studied at Machon Meir and Yeshivat Beit El. He continued to serve as a commander in the Israel Defense Forces reserves, eventually reaching the rank of Lieutenant Colonel (Sgan-Aluf).

== Beni David Pre-Military Academy ==
In 1988, Levinstein co-founded the Bnei David Pre-Military Academy in Eli alongside Rabbi Eli Sadan. It was the first pre-military academy (mechina) established in Israel, designed to prepare religious Zionist youth for military service while reinforcing their religious identity. The institution initiated a significant social shift, leading to a substantial increase in the numbers of religious officers and combat soldiers within the Israel Defense Forces.

== Views and controversies ==
Levinstein has drawn significant public attention and controversy for his conservative stances on social issues in Israel. In 2016, he delivered a speech, later known as the "pluralism speech," in which he strongly criticized the integration of women into combat roles in the Israel Defense Forces and made controversial remarks regarding the LGBT community. The speech led to widespread public condemnation from senior Israeli politicians and military officials, as well as debates over government funding for the Bnei David academy. Levinstein later clarified some of his statements but maintained his ideological opposition to progressive trends within the military.

In July 2026, Levinstein sparked further public debate when he publicly urged yeshiva and pre-military academy students to avoid enlisting in the elite Sayeret Matkal unit, claiming it had become a mixed-gender environment following decisions to integrate female combatants into maneuvering roles, including the armored corps. He argued that there was no halakhic justification for serving in such settings and criticized the military leadership, claiming that progressive agendas were weakening the military. Following his remarks, a scheduled meeting between Levinstein and the IDF Chief of Staff was canceled.
