= Rabin Pre-Military Academy =

Israeli secular mechinah

Coordinates: 32.7112°N 35.1094°E

The Rabin Pre-Military Academy (full name: המכינה הקדם-צבאית להכשרת מנהיגות חברתית ע"ש יצחק רבין; HaMekhina HaKdam-Tzva'it LeHakhsharat Manhigut Hevratit Al Shem Yitzhak Rabin—The Pre-army Preparatory Program for Training Social Leadership, named for Yitzhak Rabin) is a secular mechinah for high-school graduates in Israel, located at the Oranim College in the Western Galilee. Founded in 1998, the program features intensive studies in a range of subjects focusing on the sociopolitics of Israel, its history focusing on the pre-state pioneering settlers, Jewish studies, and humanistic-ideological aspects of current events, as well as personal development. The studies are combined with volunteer service in the public school system of outlying communities. The 10-month residential program defers compulsory military service in the framework of the post-secondary "year of service" (sh'nat sherut), after which its graduates are inducted into the Israel Defense Forces. The academy was founded and still directed by Danny Zamir who is a deputy battalion commander in the reserves.

== History ==
From its inception, Mechinat Rabin has been sponsored by the Oranim Academic College, Oranim's HaMidrasha Educational Center for the Renewal of Jewish Life in Israel, the United Kibbutz Movement, and the Yitzhak Rabin Center. It operates under the auspices of both the Ministry of Education and Ministry of Defense. Other supporting institutions include the Avi Chai Foundation, the Jewish Federation of New York, and the Jewish Agency.

Classroom studies at Mechinat Rabin are taught by a core staff, most of whom are graduates of the program, along with hired instructors, with weekly guest lecturers and offsite field trips. Study material is provided by the staff and includes content from Hamidrasha. During the course of the program, each participant prepares and delivers at least one lesson to the group, an hour and a half in length. The year concludes with a tour of the country from south to north, lasting several weeks, visiting a wide variety of populations and locales. Students spend several days attending a religious pre-army mechinah or yeshiva. The program does not include weapons training or paramilitary drills. Participation in Mechinat Rabin requires a commitment to serve in the IDF, such that a declaration of conscientious objection would result in expulsion from the program.

The dormitory facilities on the Oranim campus are converted caravans, with a communal kitchen and dining hall where participants take turns preparing breakfast and supper for the group, and a single building with showers and lavatories. Oranim also provides classroom facilities and the use of its library and cafeteria. In the 2006/7 academic year, Mechinat Rabin had its peak enrollment of 70 recent high-school graduates.

During their mechinah year, participants have regular assignments as volunteers in schools in the Galilee towns of Yoqneam, Migdal Haemek, and Nazareth Illit, an area hit by unemployment and having limited resources. They work as classroom aides and tutors, and also create extracurricular activities. A growing phenomenon is the return of groups of graduates after their discharge from the IDF, to live in these outlying towns and work in the field of education there.

Besides their volunteer placements, Mechinat Rabin participants are largely responsible for organizing and operating the program's logistics. Committees plan and purchase food, invite the guest lecturers, and find places for temporary jobs by which the participants contribute to financing the program. During several breaks in the study program during the year, they work at temporary jobs in agriculture and education, raising funds to cover 15% of the program's expenses. No tuition or other fees are charged.

For their compulsory military service, mechinah participants are encouraged to enter one of two focal tracks: the girls to positions as command in the Education and Youth Corps, and the boys to the Givati Brigade. Others are accepted into the commandos and other elite units, intelligence, or are part of a Nahal group. Members of the Mechinat Rabin educational staff, themselves IDF reservists and most with officers' rank, make periodic visits to groups of graduates at their bases and also are available for personal consultation on an ad hoc basis.

Mechinat Rabin publishes a newsletter for its graduates called Briza ("Breeze") it maintains on its website with a discussion forum and activities updates. Throughout the year, Mechinat Rabin hosts Friday and weekend gatherings of graduates, by year or all together (2008–9 being the 11th year). These regular gatherings focus on current events and topics related to the mechinah's program content, as well as for developing new and ongoing educational and community projects for the graduates who've returned to civilian life.

== Mechinat Rabin graduates' testimonies after Operation Cast Lead ==
On February 13, 2009, a month after Operation Cast Lead, graduates of Mechinat Rabin who had taken part in that Gaza operation gathered for a discussion of their experiences. These testimonies included accounts of IDF soldiers killing Palestinian civilians and intentionally destroying property under what have been described as "permissive rules of engagement" (ibid.). The nature of the accounts prompted Danny Zamir, the founder and director of Mechinat Rabin as well as being a deputy battalion commander in the reserves, to approach IDF Chief of Staff Gabi Ashkenazi. The latter's bureau requested and received a transcript of the accounts. Zamir subsequently aired his concerns in a meeting with the IDF Chief Education Officer, Brig. Gen. Eli Shermeister. Notes of the soldiers' discussion were published in the mechina's newsletter and came to the general public's attention with articles in the mainstream daily Haaretz on March 19 and 20, and broke globally on March 20 with the lead article in the International Herald Tribune print edition and on the Israeli reaction in its electronic edition. Soon after the publication of the testimonies, reports implying that the testimonies were based on hearsay and not on the first-hand experience started to circulate in Israeli media.

The IDF conducted an investigation and the Military Advocate General announced that the soldiers testimonies regarding civilians being shot were based on hearsay and no corroborating evidence was found. Danny Zamir (who himself appears in a 2004 book titled Refusnik) told Jerusalem Post that he believes the IDF operated in a way in which it tried to protect civilians in the crowded Gaza Strip and that described acts of vandalism do not make the IDF an army of war criminals. After Israeli military prosecutor's decision 65 reservists who served in Operation Cast Lead, sent the letter to Attorney-General Mazuz and asked that he launch a criminal investigation against Haaretz on charges of slander for reporting on the testimonies as if they were fact and not hearsay.

== See also ==
- Mechina
