= Bnei David Mechina =

Pre-military Jewish educational academy

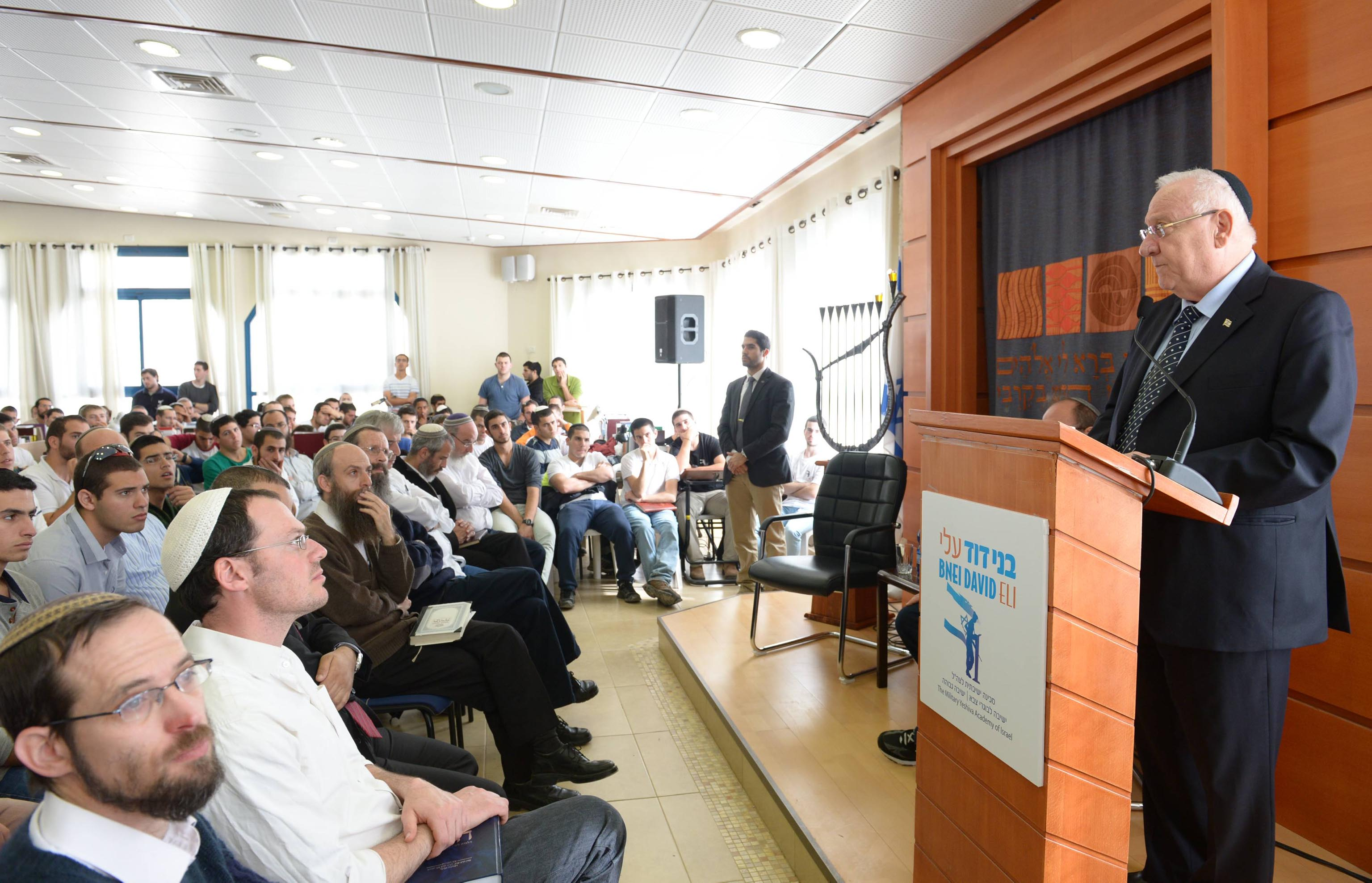
President of Israel Reuven Rivlin speaking at Mechina Bnei David Mechina

Bnei David Mechina (Hebrew: מכינה קדם-צבאית בני דוד, lit. 'Pre-Military Academy of the Sons of David'), also known as the Eli Mechina, is the first pre-military yeshiva academy or mechina founded by Israel. Established in 1988 by rabbis Eli Sadan and Yigal Levinstein, the institution is located in Eli, an Israeli settlement in the West Bank.

The academy's stated goal is to prepare religious Zionist young men for full and significant service in the IDF, particularly in combat units and officer roles. Bnei David has had a significant impact on the IDF, producing a high number of high-ranking officers and combat soldiers, while also generating public controversy for the views of its leadership about LGBT people, women, and secular Israelis.

== History ==
Bnei David was founded in 1988 in the Israeli settlement of Eli. At the time of its founding, the training model for religious soldiers was the Hesder program, which combined abbreviated military service with yeshiva study. Founding rabbis Eli Sadan and Yigal Levinstein proposed a new model that would encourage religious soldiers to commit to a full, three-year (or longer) military service, aiming to produce a generation of religious officers who could influence and rise up to the IDF's high command.

== Location and legal status ==
The academy is located in Eli, an Israeli settlement in central West Bank, north of Ramallah in Palestine. The mechina receives government funding from the Ministry of Education and, as a pre-army academy, is overseen by the Ministry of Defense.

Eli was established in 1984 on land Israel expropriated from the Palestinian villages of As-Sawiya and Qaryut.

The ICJ and the international community considers Israeli settlements in the West Bank illegal under international law, as they violate the Fourth Geneva Convention's prohibition on an occupying power transferring its own civilian population into the territory it occupies.

== Impact of the IDF ==
Bnei David has been widely noted for its success in achieving its primary goal of producing graduates who move into key positions within the Israeli military. While religious Zionists made up only 2.5% of IDF graduate officer cadets of the infantry in 1990, that number had risen to over 40% by 2024, an increase attributed to the establishment of Bnei David and the mechina movement it founded.

In 2012 alumni of the alumni were 4% of infantry recruits, but a disproportionate 25% of the graduates of the officers' track.

Around half of alumni are officers.

== Controversies ==
The mechina and its leadership have been the center of a number controversies for teachings and statements made by its rabbis.

=== LGBT People ===
In 2016, co-founder Rabbi Yigal Levinstein, in a recorded lecture, called LGBT people "deviants" and "sick." He stated that "this is a deviant group that has penetrated the army with all its might, and no one dares to open their mouth and speak against them". In a separate lecture, he referred to the gay community as a "disease" that needed to be "eliminated". The remarks drew widespread condemnation, including from then Defense Minister Avigdor Lieberman, who threatened to cut off the academy's state recognition and funding unless Levinstein resigned.

=== Women ===
Both founders and other teachers have made derogatory public statements about women.

In 2017, Rabbi Levinstein disparaged female IDF soldiers, claiming that military service "drives them crazy" and "makes them not Jewish." He further stated, "they become non-Jews" at the end of their IDF service and that "their entire value system is confused."

=== Jewish Supremacy ===
In 2019, Rabbi Eliezer Kashtiel endorsed racism, claiming that non-Jews (gentiles) are "genetically inferior" to Jews, and "We adhere to the theory of racial superiority". He stated that "Gentiles will want to be our slaves. Being a slave to a Jew is the best... They are stupid". In his own defence, Kashtiel claimed that he had been advocating “social responsibility and caring for the weak”.

Rabbi Giora Redler praised Adolf Hitler as “the most correct person there ever was”. “Let’s just start with whether Hitler was right or not,” he told students. “He was the most correct person there ever was, and was correct in every word he said… he was just on the wrong side.”

Rabbi Sadan has opposed the withdrawal from Gaza in 2005, compared the 2014 Gaza War to the biblical Samson's battle with the Philistines, which ended in mass killing, rhetoric the article described as implying annihilation. In 2024 supported a scorched-earth strategy and forcing the Gazans “to emigrate willingly”.

=== Secular Jews ===
Mechina co-founder Rabbi Eli Sadan referred to secularism as a "brain disease" and claimed that the secular judiciary and media were more dangerous to Israel than Hezbollah or Hamas.

Rabbi Giora Redler taught his students that the real genocide against the Jewish people was not the one perpetrated by the Nazis, but rather by “humanism, and the secular culture”.

== Alumni ==
There are some notable alumni of the Bnei David Mechina:

- Brigadier General Ofer Winter
- Major General Avi Blot
- Brigadier General Yehuda Vach

Those alumni who have been killed in combat include: Emmanuel Moreno, Roi Klein, Eliraz Peretz, Hadar Goldin.
