= Nahal Yam =

Israeli settlement in Egypt's Sinai Peninsula (1967–1973/1982)

Nahal Yam נח"ל ים
- Nahal settlement
- 1967–1973
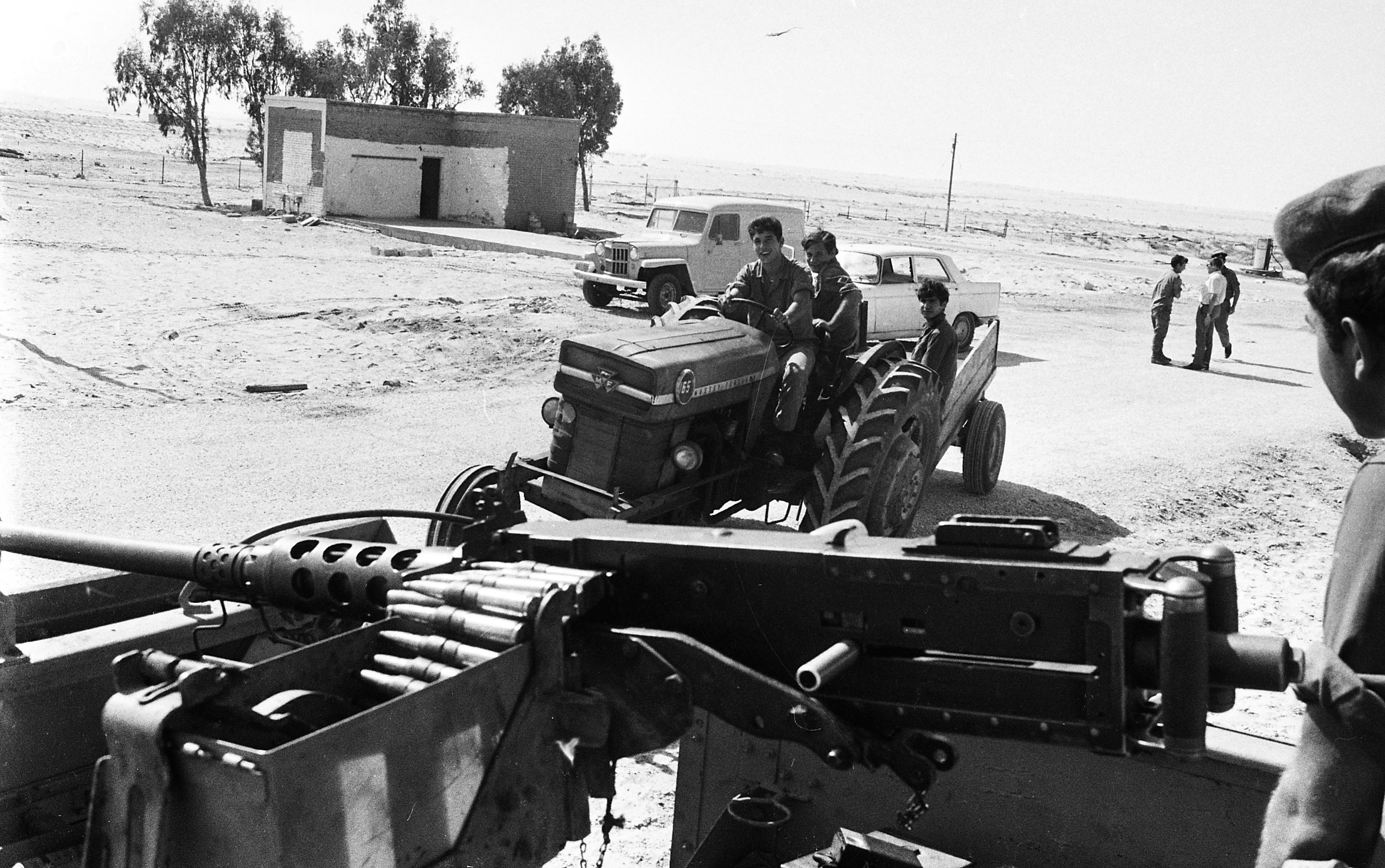
- The military-agricultural settlement in 1969

- Location in Egypt's Sinai Peninsula Location in Egypt
- Coordinates: 31°01′52″N 33°09′09″E
- Country: Egypt (de jure); Israel (de facto)
- Subdivision (Egypt): North Sinai Governorate
- Founded by Israel: 3 October 1967; 58 years ago
- Abandoned by Israel: 9 March 1973; 53 years ago
- Return of the Sinai Peninsula to Egypt: 25 April 1982; 44 years ago
- Named for: Nahal (נח"ל)

Government
  - Type: Stratocracy
  - Body: Israeli Military Governorate

Nahal Yam (Hebrew: נח"ל ים) was a Nahal settlement in the Israeli-occupied Sinai Peninsula. Located 80 kilometres (50 mi) to the east of the Suez Canal, it was established on 3 October 1967, four months after the Six-Day War. On 9 March 1973, seven months before the Yom Kippur War, Nahal Yam was slated to be abandoned in favour of a nearby fishing village. Upon the signing of the Egypt–Israel peace treaty on 26 March 1979, Israel began withdrawing from the Sinai Peninsula and finished returning it to Egypt on 25 April 1982.

== History ==
Nahal Yam was first established on 3 October 1967, almost four months after Israel emerged victorious in the Six-Day War.

On 22 November 1967, the United Nations Ambassador of the United Arab Republic (amalgamated Egypt and Syria) described the Nahal settlement as a "colony" in a letter to the United Nations Security Council.

In 1968, the Jewish Agency ordered the construction of a water desalination plant to provide for the settlement's residents.

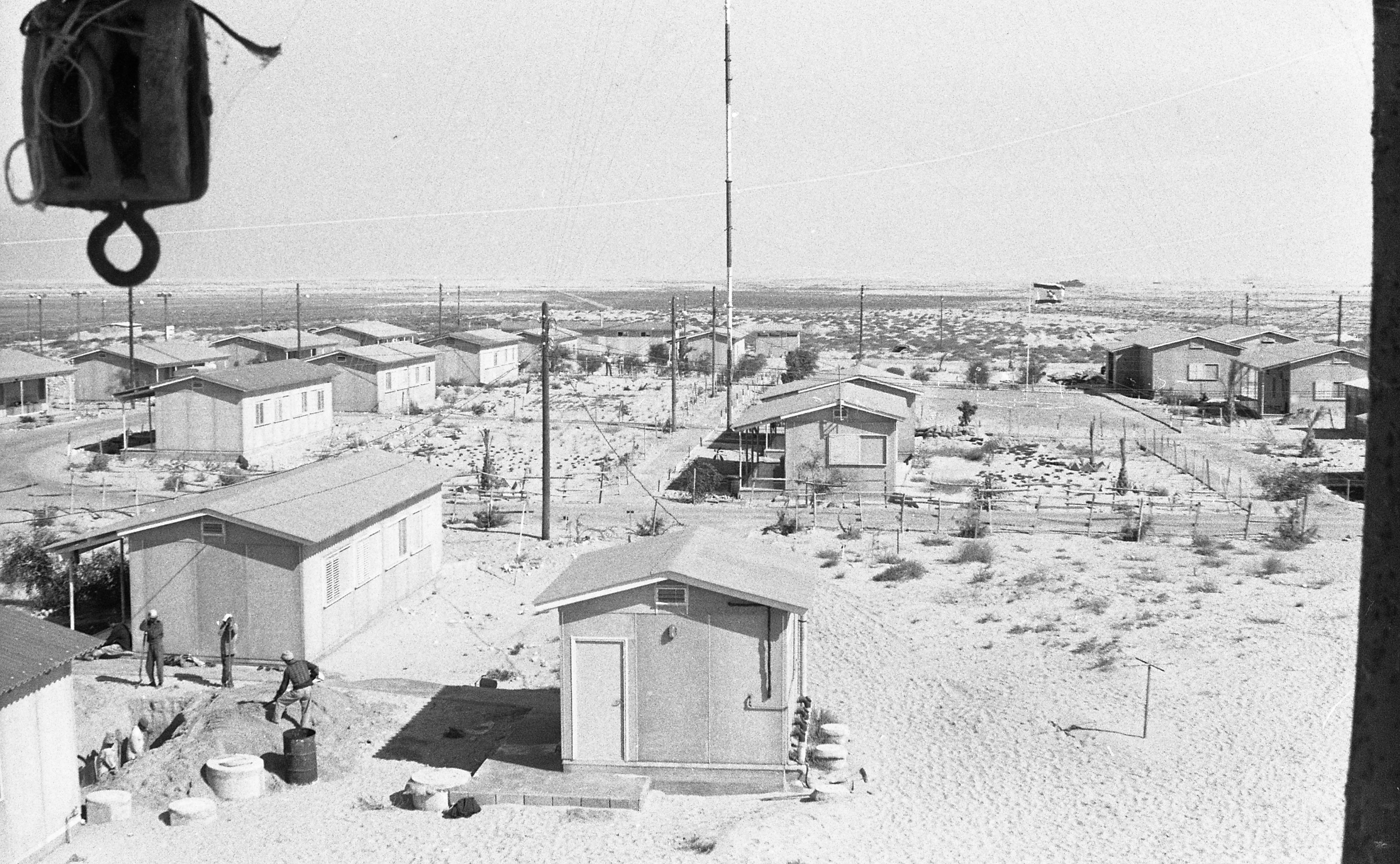
The establishment in 1969

On 23 July 1969, seven Israeli soldiers of Nahal were injured when several bazooka shells detonated in the settlement.

On 4 October 1969, Egyptian military aircraft dropped several bombs near the settlement, but were unable to inflict any damage or injuries.

On 24 April 1970, Egyptian military aircraft again dropped several bombs near the settlement, but were unable to inflict any damage or injuries.

On 18 May 1970, the Orith, an Israeli fishing boat, was sunk by an Egyptian missile off of Nahal Yam's coast. Two crew members clung to the wreckage and washed ashore at the settlement.

On 16 February 1971, Israel captured and charged two Egyptian agents from Arish after they fired bazookas at the settlement.

On 9 March 1973, the Jewish Agency announced that Nahal Yam would be abandoned in favour of a nearby fishing village.

On 26 March 1979, the Egypt–Israel peace treaty was signed and Israel returned the Sinai Peninsula to Egypt by 25 April 1982.
