= Tamar Adar =

Israeli writer

- תמר אדר
- Born: 24 July 1939; Tel Aviv, Mandatory Palestine
- Died: 6 December 2008 (aged 69)
- Occupations: Writer; poet; playwright; screenwriter
- Website: tamaradar.com

Tamar Adar (Hebrew: תמר אדר; 24 July 1939 – 6 December 2008) was an Israeli writer, poet, playwright, and screenwriter.

== Life ==
Adar was born in Tel Aviv.

Adar wrote screenplays for several popular Israeli television series, including the children's educational series Ma Pitom, and published around 40 children's books. She received the Ministry of Education's Ze'ev Prize for children's and young adult literature and other awards, including the Ze’ev Prize (1987) for her children's book Cat, Sailor, Clown.

She died in 2008.
