= Michve Alon =

Coordinates: 32°54′8.5″N 35°25′11.41″E

- Israel
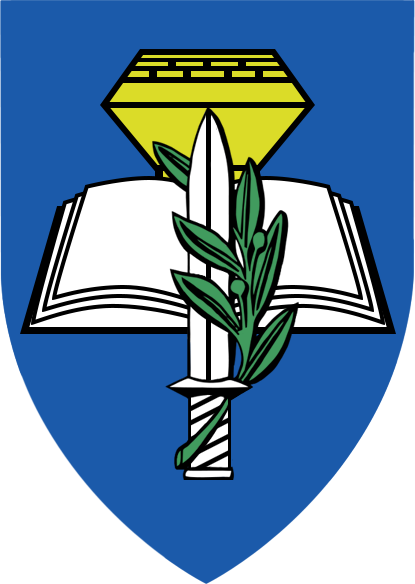
- Logo of the base

Site information
- Type: Military Training Base
- Owner: Israel Defense Forces
- Operator: Education and Youth Corps

Garrison information
- Garrison: Israeli Ground Forces: Bislamach Brigade

Michve Allon (Hebrew: מַחוָׁ"ה (מרכז חינוך והדרכה) אלון, romanized: Mercaz khinukh vehadrakha Allon, lit. 'Allon Education and Instructional Center') is an IDF military training base located in the Galilee, near Safed and Maghar.

== History ==
Michve Allon is a training base of the IDF Education and Youth Corps. It is named for Yigal Allon.

The base operates an ulpan (Hebrew language school) for soldiers whose Hebrew is deemed insufficient by the IDF. It accepts new immigrants, Druze and Bedouin soldiers, who study Hebrew together with basic training.

The base also operates basic training for soldiers with high kahas (an abbreviated way of saying adjustment difficulty score in Hebrew).

The base also hosts an army GED course for soldiers who did not finish school for one reason or another.

Until the 1980s, Michve Allon served as the base for the Bislamach Brigade, but that brigade transferred to a base near Yeruham. The base's goal is to train soldiers for special groups, help them integrate into their service, and become productive citizens of Israel.

In August 2024, Hezbollah fired rockets at the base and other parts of Israel.
