= Mordechai Bar-On =

Israeli politician (1928–2021)

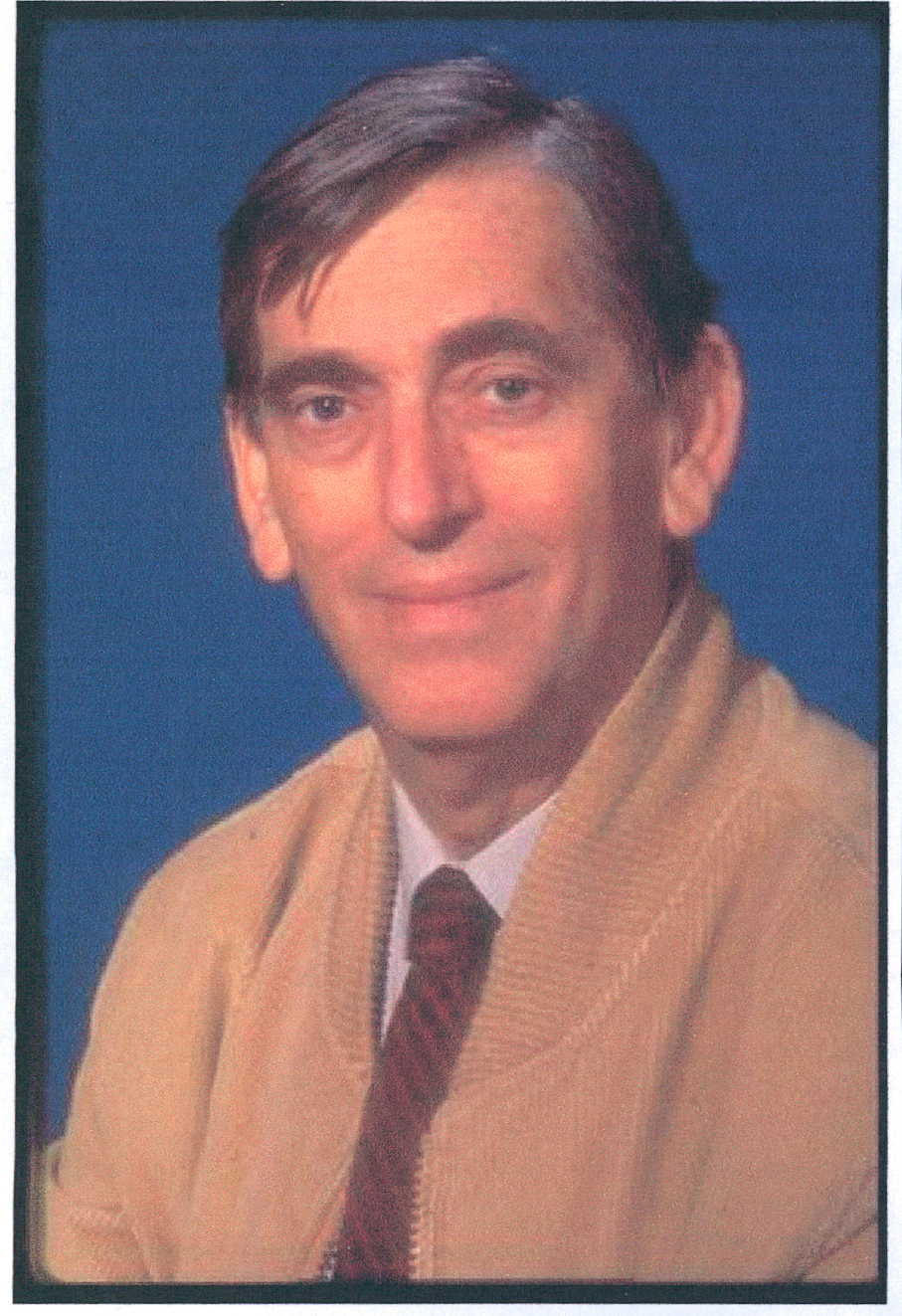
- Bar-On in the mid-1980s

Faction represented in the Knesset
- 1984–1986: Ratz

Personal details
- Born: 26 December 1928 Tel Aviv, Mandatory Palestine
- Died: 7 March 2021 (aged 92) Jerusalem, Israel

Mordechai Bar-On (Hebrew: מרדכי בר-און; 26 December 1928 – 7 March 2021) was an Israeli historian, Chief Education Officer of the Israel Defense Forces and politician, serving as a member of the Knesset for Ratz from 1984 to 1986.

== Biography ==
Born in Tel Aviv during the Mandate era, Bar-On was a member of the IDF's first officer training course in 1948. He became a platoon commander and company commander in the Givati Brigade, and in 1954 established the Academic Pool. The following year he became head of the History Department of the General Staff, before being appointed head of the Chief of Staff's bureau in 1958. From 1961 until 1963 he served as the deputy Chief Education Officer in the Education and Youth Corps, before becoming its head in 1963. He was demobilized in 1968. After leaving the IDF, he worked for the Jewish Agency for Israel, heading its Youth and Pioneering Department until 1977.

Bar-On later became one of the leaders of the Peace Now movement, and was elected to the Knesset in 1984 on the Ratz list. However, he resigned from the Knesset on 26 November 1986, and was replaced by David Zucker.

He died in March 2021.

== Books ==
Books Bar-On authored include:

- The Gates of Gaza: Israel’s Road to Suez and Back, 1955–1957 (1994)
- In Pursuit of Peace: A History of the Israeli Peace Movement (1996)
- Never-ending Conflict: Israeli Military History (2004)
- Moshe Dayan: Israel's Controversial Hero (2012)
