= Mechina =

Israeli educational institution

Pre-Military Leadership Academies
- מכינות קדם-צבאיות
- Founded: 1988
- Type: Non-formal educational institution
- Purpose: Pre-military preparation; leadership development; community service
- Headquarters: Israel
- Members: ~4,500 students per year (2024) (Note: Figure from the Joint Council of Pre-Military Academies, "About the Joint Council of Mechinot")
- Parent organization: Joint Council of Pre-Military Academies
- Website: mechinot.org.il

A mechina kdam-tzvait (Hebrew: מכינה קדם-צבאית, literally "pre-military preparatory"; plural mechinot, Hebrew: מכינות) is an Israeli residential gap year educational institution for high school graduates, operating in the period between the end of secondary schooling and mandatory service in the Israel Defense Forces (IDF). The mechina year typically lasts ten months and emphasises non-formal and experiential learning, combining studies in Jewish identity, Zionism, Israeli society, ethics, and leadership, with community volunteering and physical preparation for army service.

The mechina movement originated in the religious Zionist sector in 1988, with the founding of Bnei David Mechina in Eli by the rabbis Eli Sadan and Yigal Levinstein. Secular mechinot emerged starting in 1997. The Pre-Military Leadership Academies Act (2008), passed unanimously by the Knesset, gave the network formal legal recognition and state funding and prompted the formation of the Joint Council of Pre-Military Academies (JCM) as an umbrella body. As of 2024, the JCM represented 61 accredited mechinot spread across Israel, enrolling approximately 4,500 students annually and counting over 50,000 alumni.

Mechinot graduates are markedly over-represented in IDF leadership. According to IDF Human Resources Directorate figures from 2022, some 21 percent of men who graduated from non-Orthodox mechinot and 18 percent of men from Orthodox mechinot go on to complete an officer course, compared with 11 percent of the general population. For women, the figure is 22 percent versus 10 percent in the general population. Between 40 and 60 percent of graduates of every IDF flight-school class are mechina alumni.

== Background and context ==
Israel maintains a system of compulsory military service, requiring most Jewish citizens to serve in the Israel Defense Forces (IDF) after secondary school—three years for men and two for women. Until the development of the mechina model, the principal framework available to Religious Zionist men who wished to combine Torah study with army service was the Hesder program. Hesder combines advanced Talmudic study with military service of approximately 16–17 months (within an overall program of five years), substantially shorter than the standard three-year service obligation. Hesder graduates rarely attained combat or officer positions in significant numbers, since the shortened service limited access to elite units and officer-training pipelines.

== History ==
=== Founding of the first mechina (1988) ===
In 1988, the commander of the IDF's Central Command, Major General Amram Mitzna, sought to increase the number of Religious Zionist soldiers pursuing officer careers. He approached the rabbis Eli Sadan and Yigal Levinstein and asked them to create a preparatory program offering full three-year service alongside intensive Torah study—a model that did not then exist within the Hesder framework.

The result was Bnei David Mechina, established at the settlement of Eli in the West Bank. Sadan's founding motivation was in part statistical: he observed that more than half of the Religious Zionist soldiers enlisting in the IDF directly from high school abandoned religious observance during service, with an even higher proportion among those who joined elite units. The mechina year was intended to fortify spiritual resilience and ideological commitment before conscription.

The academy opened on a sparsely populated hilltop, with students housed in trailers; an early account described a single Volkswagen Bus navigating a dirt road to bring people into the settlement. Rabbi Sadan was awarded the Israel Prize for Lifetime Achievement in 2016 for his role in founding the mechina enterprise.

=== Expansion to the secular sector (1990s) ===
Two years after co-founding Bnei David, Sadan encouraged the application of the pre-military academy concept to secular Israeli youth. The first secular mechina, Nahshon, was established in 1997 in Nili, with close assistance from the existing Orthodox mechinot. In 1998, the Rabin Pre-Military Academy was founded at Oranim College in the Galilee by Danny Zamir, expanding the secular model with a focus on social leadership, the history of the pre-state pioneering settlers, and humanist values.

Throughout the late 1990s and the 2000s, the number of both religious and secular mechinot grew steadily, reflecting increasing demand among Israeli youth for a structured year of personal development before conscription.

=== Legal recognition and institutionalisation (2008) ===
In 2008, the Knesset passed the Pre-Military Leadership Academies Act by a large majority and without a single opposing vote. The legislation:

- gave mechinot official recognition as an accredited educational category;
- established funding mechanisms requiring the Ministry of Defense and the Ministry of Education jointly to cover approximately 50 percent of per-student costs;
- required, as a condition of accreditation, that at least 90 percent of graduates serve in meaningful IDF positions;
- established frameworks for accreditation, expansion, and quality assurance.

Following the law's passage, all accredited mechinot formed an umbrella body, the Joint Council of Mechinot (Hebrew: מועצת המכינות הקדם-צבאיות הציוניות הישראליות), established in 2008 as a registered nonprofit to coordinate shared projects, standards, and recruitment across the network. In 2015, a further regulation granted mechina students free public transport, equivalent to the rights of Religious Zionist participants—reinforcing official recognition of their societal contribution.

=== Growth and post-October 2023 expansion ===
By the 2023–24 academic year, approximately 4,500 students were enrolled across Joint Council of Pre-Military Academies (JCM)-affiliated programmes. The 7 October 2023 Hamas attack and the ensuing war caused significant disruption to the mechina year: many staff members were called up as reservists, and in early 2024, the IDF advanced the mandatory enlistment of approximately 1,200 currently enrolled students in order to meet combat-unit needs. Simultaneously, enrolment applications for the following academic year increased sharply at several mechinot. Bnei David, for instance, reported 600 new students in the cycle immediately following 7 October.

In response to the war, the JCM launched its "11-Point Plan", committing to establish or expand eleven mechinot in communities near the Gaza border and in northern Israel, regions where mechinot already served as centres of volunteering, community resilience, and education.

== Structure and program ==
=== Duration and residency ===
Mechinot are residential programs of approximately ten months, typically running from late summer through to the following June or July. Students live together onsite, an arrangement considered central to the model's educational philosophy of forging bonds across social, geographic, and ideological divides.

=== Curriculum ===
All JCM-accredited mechinot, regardless of religious orientation, are required to incorporate study and structured activity in the following five domains:

- Judaism and Jewish identity – engagement with Jewish texts, history, ethics, and questions of personal and collective identity.
- Zionism and Israeli society – study of the Zionist movement, the history of the State of Israel, and contemporary social and political issues.
- Leadership development – practical and theoretical training in decision-making, group facilitation, and taking responsibility.
- Community service and volunteering – one to two days per week are dedicated to volunteer placements in nearby communities, schools, or social-welfare organisations.
- Preparation for military service – physical conditioning, navigation, and familiarity with IDF structure and values.

In addition to classroom study, the year includes experiential components: a multi-day wilderness navigation course conducted in cooperation with Keren Kayemeth LeIsrael; a hovek yisrael (exploration of Israel) trek of ten days to two weeks, during which students travel through diverse regions and communities; and visits to IDF bases and historic sites. Secular mechinot, such as Mechinat Rabin, generally do not include weapons training or paramilitary drills.

=== Community volunteering ===
Community volunteering is a defining feature of the mechina year. Students are placed in peripheral towns, schools, hospitals, and social-welfare organisations one to two days per week throughout the year. Over time, students take increasing responsibility for coordinating these activities themselves. A notable post-army development, documented at several secular mechinot, is the settlement of mechina alumni cohorts in the outlying communities where they volunteered during the year.

=== Funding ===
Under the 2008 Pre-Military Leadership Academies Act, the ministries of defense and education together cover approximately 50 percent of each student's annual cost. Family tuition fees average roughly US$2,500 per year. The remaining gap is addressed through fundraising. The JCM operates a scholarship fund to assist students from Israel's social and geographic periphery—approximately 33 percent of the student body, according to 2021–22 JCM figures. The approximate annual per-student operating cost is around US$12,500, broken down across educational staff and programs, room and board, informal education and volunteering activities, administration, and facilities.

== Types of mechina ==
=== Orthodox / religious mechinot ===
Orthodox mechinot (Hebrew: מכינות תורניות) cater primarily to graduates of yeshiva or state-religious high schools. Their curriculum combines intensive Torah and Talmudic study—including Gemara, Halacha, and Jewish thought—with physical and ideological preparation for full three-year IDF service. A particular emphasis is placed on equipping students to maintain religious observance in the predominantly secular army environment, a concern that drove the founding of the mechina model in the first place.

The first and most prominent Orthodox mechina is Bnei David Mechina in Eli (est. 1988). Other notable Orthodox mechinot include:

- Arzei HaLevanon (Ma'ale Efrayim)
- Carmei Hayil (Beit Rimon)
- Hemdat Yehuda (Hemdat)
- Katzrin (Katzrin)
- Keshet Yehuda (Keshet)—also operates an English-language program for diaspora students
- Magen Shaul (Nokdim)
- Yatir (Beit Yatir)
- Mechinat Avnei Eitan (Avnei Eitan)—founded in 2004; among the first English-language Orthodox mechinot

=== Secular and traditional mechinot ===
Secular mechinot (Hebrew: מכינות כלליות) are open to graduates of all backgrounds. Their curricula foreground citizenship education, pluralistic study of Jewish heritage and history, Israeli society, politics, philosophy, and ethics. The first secular mechina, Nahshon, was founded in 1997 in Nili. The Mechinat Rabin at Oranim College (est. 1998) is among the most prominent.

=== Mixed religious–secular (pluralist) mechinot ===
A number of mechinot deliberately bring together students from Orthodox, traditional, and secular backgrounds, treating sustained inter-sector dialogue and coexistence as core educational goals. The JCM describes this as one of the only platforms in contemporary Israeli society where people of sharply differing worldviews—religious and secular, political left and right—collaborate on a daily basis as a matter of institutional design. Notable examples include:

- Ein Prat: the Academy for Leadership (Kfar Adumim)—founded in 2001
- Hannaton Mechina (Hanaton)—affiliated with the Masorti/Conservative movement
- HaEmek (Kfar Ruppin)
- Beit Yisrael (Kibbutz Beit Yisrael, Gilo)

== Impact ==
=== IDF service and leadership ===
The following figures are drawn from IDF Human Resources Directorate data (2022), as published by the Joint Council of Mechinot:

- 21% of men from non-Orthodox mechinot complete an officer course, compared with 11% in the general male population.
- 18% of men from Orthodox mechinot complete an officer course.
- 22% of women from mechinot complete an officer course, compared with 10% in the general female population.
- Between 40% and 60% of graduates of every IDF flight-school class are mechina alumni.
- Between 19% and 25% of those completing every naval officer training class are mechina graduates.
- Mechina graduates account for approximately 10% of IDF soldiers annually honoured by the President of Israel.
- Mechina alumni are statistically less likely than the general soldier population to drop out of service or commit military offences.

=== Civil society ===
The mechinot explicitly aim to develop leaders for Israeli civil society beyond the army. Alumni have taken up leadership roles in local government, education, social entrepreneurship, and community development. The JCM's Be'Artzeinu alumni movement, established in 2016, operates student villages in peripheral communities and Amali Forum programs for recently discharged soldiers, channelling alumni into development of the Negev and Galilee, community settlement, and civic volunteering on a national scale.

Recognitions of the broader civic impact of the mechina enterprise include the Yigal Allon Prize for Outstanding Pioneering Work (2010), awarded to the mechina network as a whole, and the Jerusalem Unity Prize (2020), awarded to the Joint Council of Mechinot.

=== Diaspora engagement ===
In the 2021–22 academic year, over 150 young Jews from outside Israel—approximately five percent of the total student body—attended mechinot through the JCM's Yachad program, which integrates diaspora participants into the Israeli student body and provides Hebrew-language instruction.

=== Social inclusion ===
According to 2021–22 JCM figures, 33 percent of mechina students came from the social, geographic, or economic periphery of Israel or from special-needs populations. Some 50 students with disabilities attend mechinot every year, supported by the JCM's Shibolim program, which provides mentoring and assistance to ensure equal access to the mechina experience as preparation for meaningful IDF service.

== Governance ==
=== Joint Council of Pre-Military Academies ===
The Joint Council of Mechinot (Hebrew: מועצת המכינות הקדם-צבאיות הציוניות הישראליות) was established in 2008 as a registered nonprofit following passage of the Pre-Military Leadership Academies Act. As of 2024, its membership comprised 61 mechinot—23 Orthodox and 38 general (traditional, secular, mixed, or serving a distinct population group)—all accredited by the ministries of defense and education.

The council coordinates shared educational projects, annual conferences, joint seminars, and national initiatives; runs centralised admissions for secular and traditional mechinot; administers the Yachad program; operates a scholarship fund; and runs the Shibolim integration program. Governance is structured to reflect the religious diversity of the membership: decisions are made by elected representatives of the mechina heads through open dialogue, and the council always has two co-chairs—one representing the secular and one the Orthodox mechinot.

=== Accreditation requirements ===
To receive state funding under the 2008 law, a mechina must:

1. Operate as a full-year residential program of approximately ten months;
2. Deliver structured curricula in the five domains (Jewish identity, Zionism, leadership, community service, and military preparation);
3. Achieve a graduate placement rate of at least 90 percent in meaningful IDF service roles;
4. Uphold values of democracy, pluralism, and tolerance.

== Controversy ==
=== Bnei David and the Levinstein affair ===
Bnei David Mechina has attracted sustained public controversy since 2016 due to the public statements of its co-founder, Rabbi Yigal Levinstein. In July 2016, Levinstein was recorded calling LGBT people "deviant", triggering widespread criticism and calls from Knesset members for withdrawal of state funding from the mechina. In early 2017, Levinstein made further remarks, telling IDF recruits that military service drives female soldiers "crazy" and "strips them of their Jewishness". In 2018, Levinstein made further remarks, comparing the elimination of homosexuality to the eradication of AIDS.

The Defense Ministry summoned rabbis Sadan and Levinstein to a formal hearing, and Defense Minister Avigdor Lieberman threatened to decertify Bnei David from the mechina program pending their response. The mechina issued formal apologies on several occasions for Levinstein's and other rabbis' remarks, and the IDF chief of staff publicly distanced the army from the comments; Bnei David's accreditation was ultimately maintained. The controversy prompted broader debate about the relationship between state funding, religious autonomy, and IDF diversity norms within the mechina system.

=== Nahal Tzafit disaster (2018) ===
On 26 April 2018, ten teenagers—nine girls and one boy, aged 17–18—were killed when a flash flood swept through Nahal Tzafit (Hebrew: נחל צפית), a dry riverbed near the Dead Sea, during a field trip organised by the Bnei Tzion pre-military academy (Hebrew: מכינת בני ציון). The 25 participants were candidates who had been accepted to the mechina and were attending an orientation hike ahead of their enrolment year. They descended into the canyon despite rainfall and prior weather warnings, and a flash flood struck approximately thirty minutes later. Thirteen students were rescued unharmed; two others sustained minor injuries.

In November 2024, the Beersheba District Court convicted the academy's former principal, Yuval Kahan, and its former educational director, Aviv Bardichev, on ten counts of negligent manslaughter, finding that both had disregarded repeated weather warnings and proceeded with the route. In April 2025, both were sentenced to seven years in prison and ordered to pay NIS 210,000 in compensation to the victims' families; the State Attorney's Office subsequently announced an appeal seeking a 12-year term.

The disaster is considered Israel's deadliest flood-related tragedy. It prompted a wider reckoning over the safety oversight of mechinot: prior to the event, the Ministry of Education had taken the position that mechinot were not subject to safety regulations for field activities and had not permitted them to use the national trip-coordination office responsible for approving or halting hikes on the basis of weather conditions.
