= Nahal settlement =

Settlements established by the Israeli Nahal Brigade

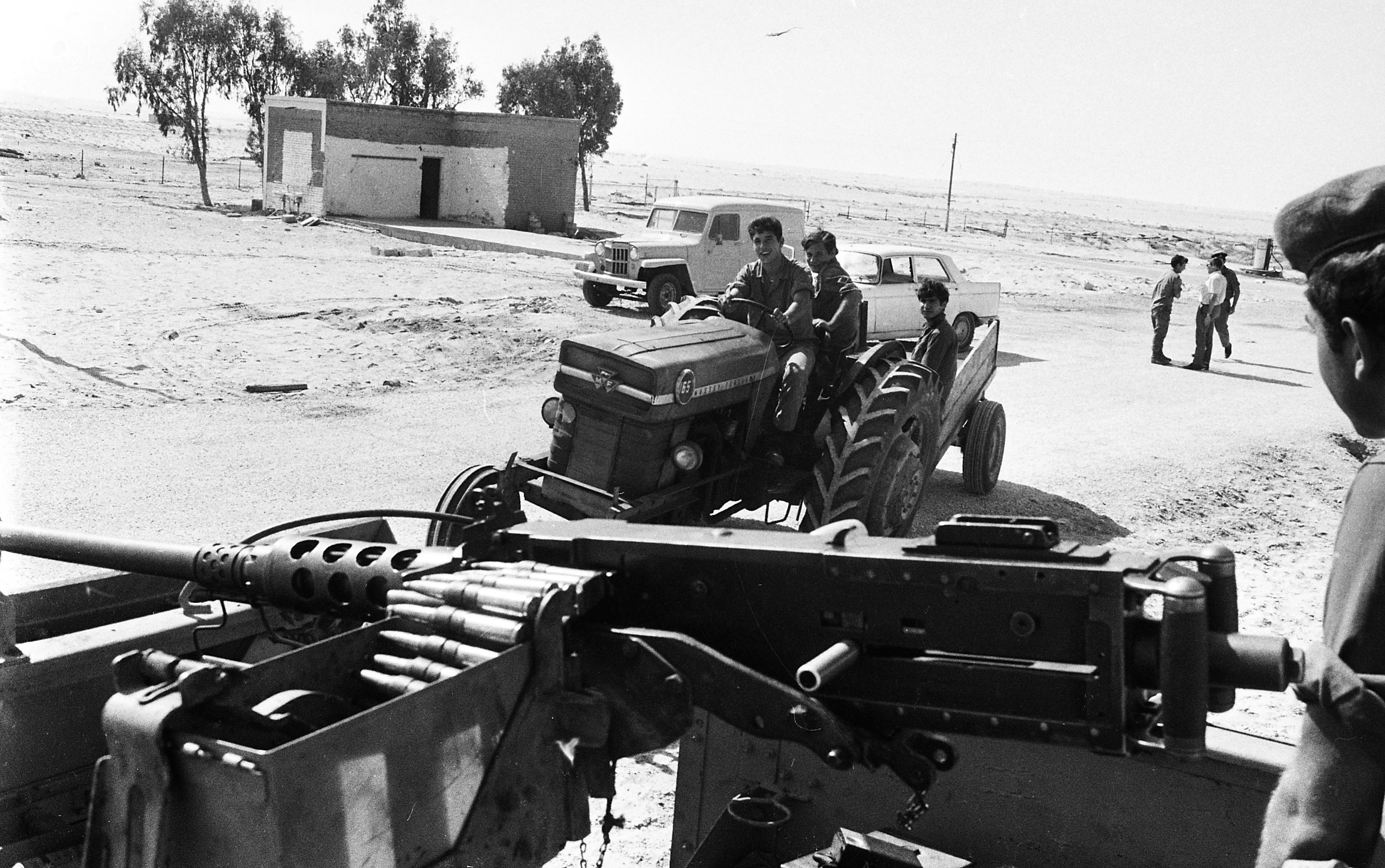
The Israeli military-agricultural settlement of Nahal Yam in occupied Egyptian Sinai, 1969.

Nahal settlements (Hebrew: היאחזות נח"ל, romanized: Heahzut Nahal) are Israeli settlements established by Israeli soldiers of Nahal in both Israel and the Israeli-occupied territories.

Supporting the growth and expansion of Israeli Jews was once the main focus of Nahal troops of the Israel Defense Forces and was primarily carried out through the Garin program. The goal of Nahal settlement was to provide a base of operations and resources for Israeli troops along the border.

This method of encouraging settlement was particularly effective in regions of Israel that were less desirable for human habitation (mainly the Negev, the Galilee, and the Aravah) between 1948 and 1967. After the 1967 Arab–Israeli War, Nahal settlements were established in the newly Israeli-occupied territories (the Jordanian-annexed West Bank and the Egyptian-occupied Gaza Strip, and the Syrian Golan Heights and the Egyptian Sinai Peninsula) in pursuit of similar goals.

The first such settlement was Nahal Oz, located in the northwestern Negev in Israel, near the Gaza–Israel border.

== See also ==
- Category:Nahal settlements
