= Jonathan Company =

Jonathan Company was a military unit in the Israeli 1947–1949 Palestine war composed mainly of youngsters under the age of 18, from the Gadna and their adult instructors. The company is noted for its high casualty rate, and the youth of its members. The company was established in April 1948 in Jerusalem and dissolved in August 1948 due to its heavy losses in combat. It was part of the Etzioni Brigade.

== Establishment ==
Jonathan Company was established on April 9, 1948, by Yehoshua Arieli, the Jerusalem commander of the Gadna, (pre-military training corps for youth), and later a history professor and Israel Prize laureate. The company was a significant addition to the Haganah (literally "Defense" – the Jewish military organization preceding the IDF) in Jerusalem, as the city had been under siege due to the Arab blockade since the beginning of 1948, and hence completely isolated from the other Jewish settlements in Palestine. The city thus had to defend itself using local forces alone. Youngsters under the legal age of recruitment were trying to get themselves drafted into fighting units in order to contribute to the military efforts of the Haganah. The Jonathan Company was established in an effort to prevent these youngsters from joining fighting units, instead training them, and positioning them at guard posts and bases in the beleaguered city. They were intended as a reserve unit, only to be sent to the front in case of emergency – a scenario which ultimately transpired.

== Command ==
Oded Hai and Eli Zohar (Lichtenstein), two young Haganah commanders who had just graduated from an officers' course, were nominated as the company's commanders. They were Gadna graduates from Jerusalem who had been sent to an officers' course at a Haganah base near the Palestinian coast at the beginning of 1948, before the siege of Jerusalem. In April 1948, they re-entered the besieged city with an armed convoy under Arab fire, and Arieli put them in command of the Jonathan Company.

== Battles ==
In May 1948, while the Jordanian Legion, the Egyptian army and the Palestinian irregular troops invaded the Jewish-controlled parts of Jerusalem, the company was sent to several defense and combat positions along the border – Notre-Dame de France, Mount Zion, Talpiot and Ramat Rachel, where they clashed with the enemy in a string of fierce battles. The enemy was held at bay, but several young soldiers were killed in action and about a quarter of the company personnel was wounded.

At the end of the first truce, in July, the company was sent to occupy the Kerem lookout point (Hirbet Hamame, Arabic for “doves' ruins”) in order to defuse the Arab threat to nearby Jewish neighborhoods, Beit HaKerem and Bayit VeGan. Nowadays, the Kerem lookout point is the hill above the Valley of Communities at Yad Vashem.

On July 9, the Jonathan Company started to advance from the outskirts of the Bayit VeGan neighborhood towards the Kerem lookout point, led by a 10-soldier squad headed by Eli Zohar, the company's deputy commander. They were followed by the rest of the company led by commander Oded Hai. They were fired at by the Arab forces manning the Kerem lookout point, and Oded Hai was killed instantly. Oded was the only one who knew where the defense lines of the hill were located, dug by the Turkish army against the British in World War I. With his death, the company lost not only its commander but its only field intelligence man. At the same time, a Lehi unit attacking the parallel route leading to the hill over the valley was ambushed, losing several soldiers including the commander, and retreated. The regional headquarters was hesitant about giving the Jonathan Company the go-ahead to advance, since if the young soldiers succeeded, they would be under enfilade fire from that hill over the valley, a hill still held by Arab forces armed with superior weapons.

Eli Zohar insisted that the company could conquer the hill and defend it, and the regional headquarters approved the advance. The company changed track, bypassing the hill southward toward the valley, and marching up the hill. Due to the element of surprise – a combination of darkness and the unexpected route of attack – the company took the hill with relatively few casualties, all of whom were not fatally wounded.

All through the night, the young soldiers searched for the protective tunnels dug by the Turks, but to no avail. They tried digging trenches in the rocky ground, but were unsuccessful, and so, they started heaping up stones in order to make protective mounds in advance of the immanent counter-attack. Furthermore, they faced superior Arab fire supporting the enemy from the hill across the valley, at a distance of only several hundred meters.

The Arabs started to bombard the company soldiers in the morning. The bombardment lasted until the afternoon, after which an Arab force comprising Egyptian, Sudanese, Polish, German and Serb soldiers climbed the hill in an attempt to conquer it.

At the top of the hill was an ancient well, which was empty of water and was being used as a refuge point for the wounded soldiers. Out of 70 company soldiers, some 25 were wounded in battle and taken to the cave. An additional five soldiers were killed as the Arabs advanced. Eli Zohar was among the wounded too, but in the cave, he took the entire stock of mortar shells from the wounded soldier in charge of them, and exploded them on the advancing Arab forces who were now only dozens of meters away. Additional battle actions taken simultaneously by other company soldiers brought the Arab attack to a halt and they retreated. Later, Zohar was recommended by Arieli for an official medal of courage for his actions in this battle. Of the six soldiers killed in action, two were 16 year- old privates.

Two days later, the remnants of the company joined forces with an Etzel fighting brigade in the conquest of the Arab village of Malha, in which 18 Etzel soldiers were killed. One week later the Jonathan Company conquered the Arab-Christian village of Ein Karem.

== Consequences ==
The company's battles, especially the battle over the Kerem lookout point, were one of the few battles on the southern front of Jerusalem which established the internationally recognized borders of Jerusalem at the end of the 1947–1949 Palestine war. These borders – the 1949 armistice lines – are the basis for every peace agreement negotiation and intermediate settlement between Israel and its neighboring states.

== Photo Gallery ==
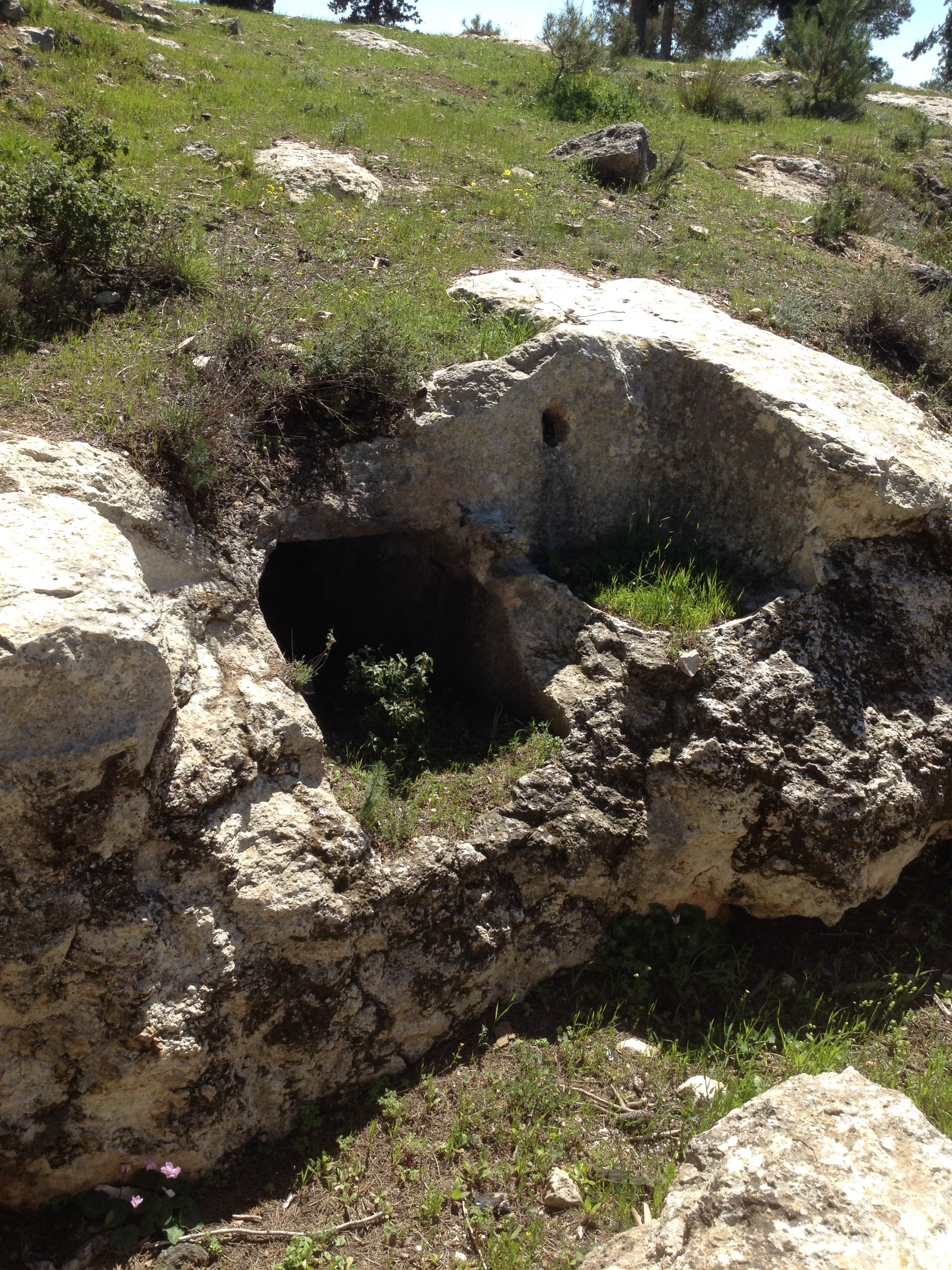
A fortification in the Turkish trenches at the battle site

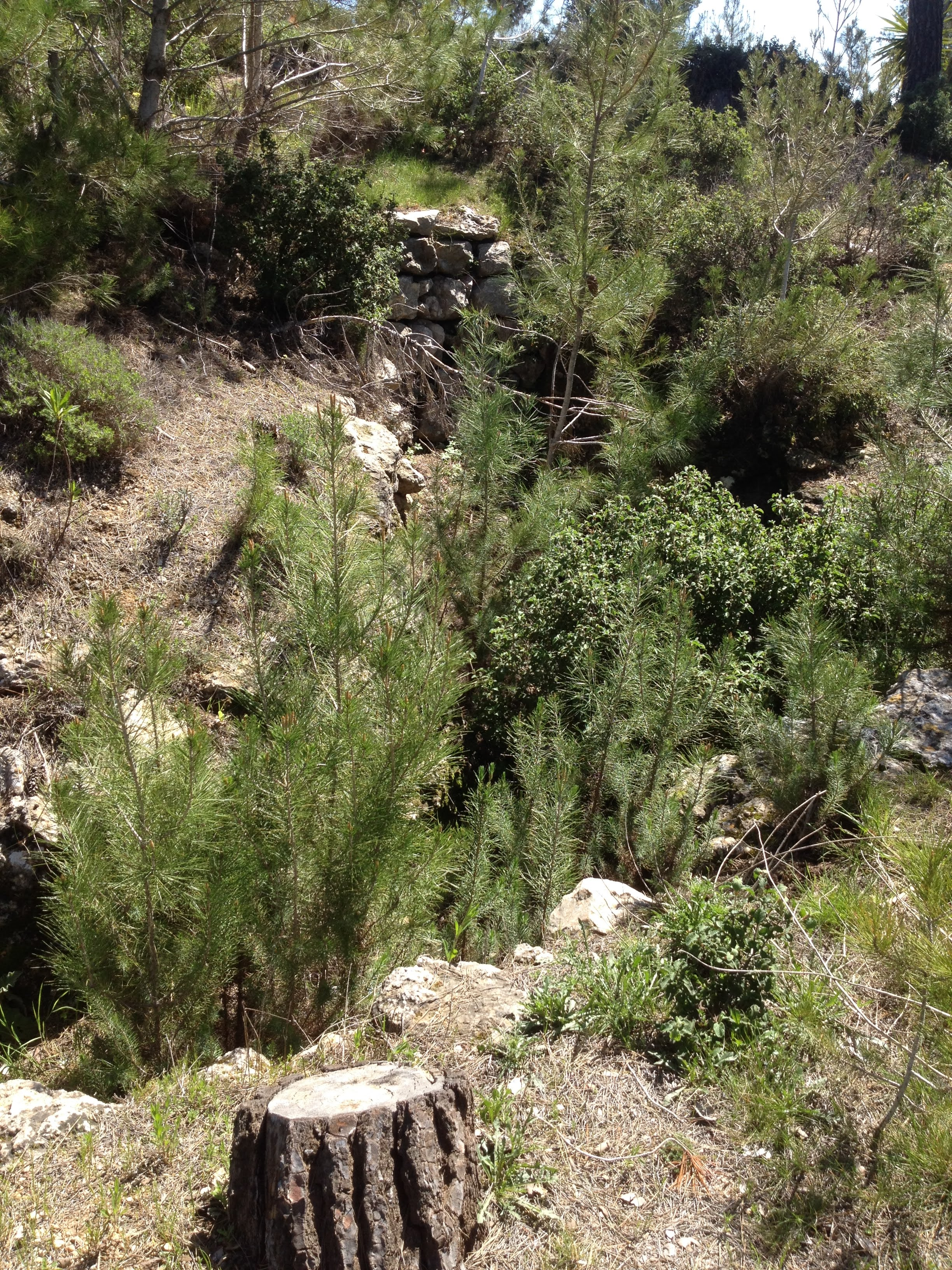
some of the trenches

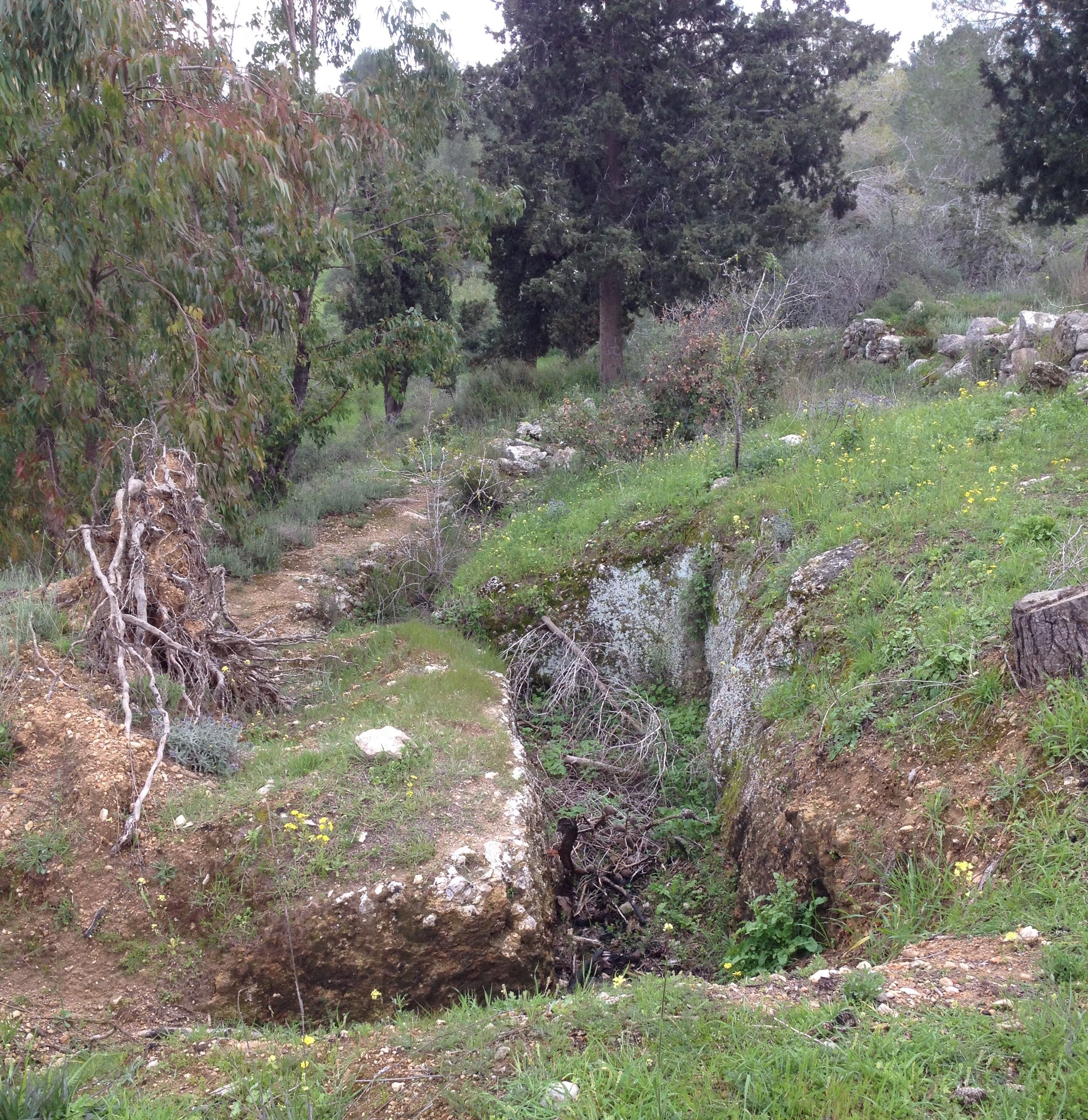
some of the trenches

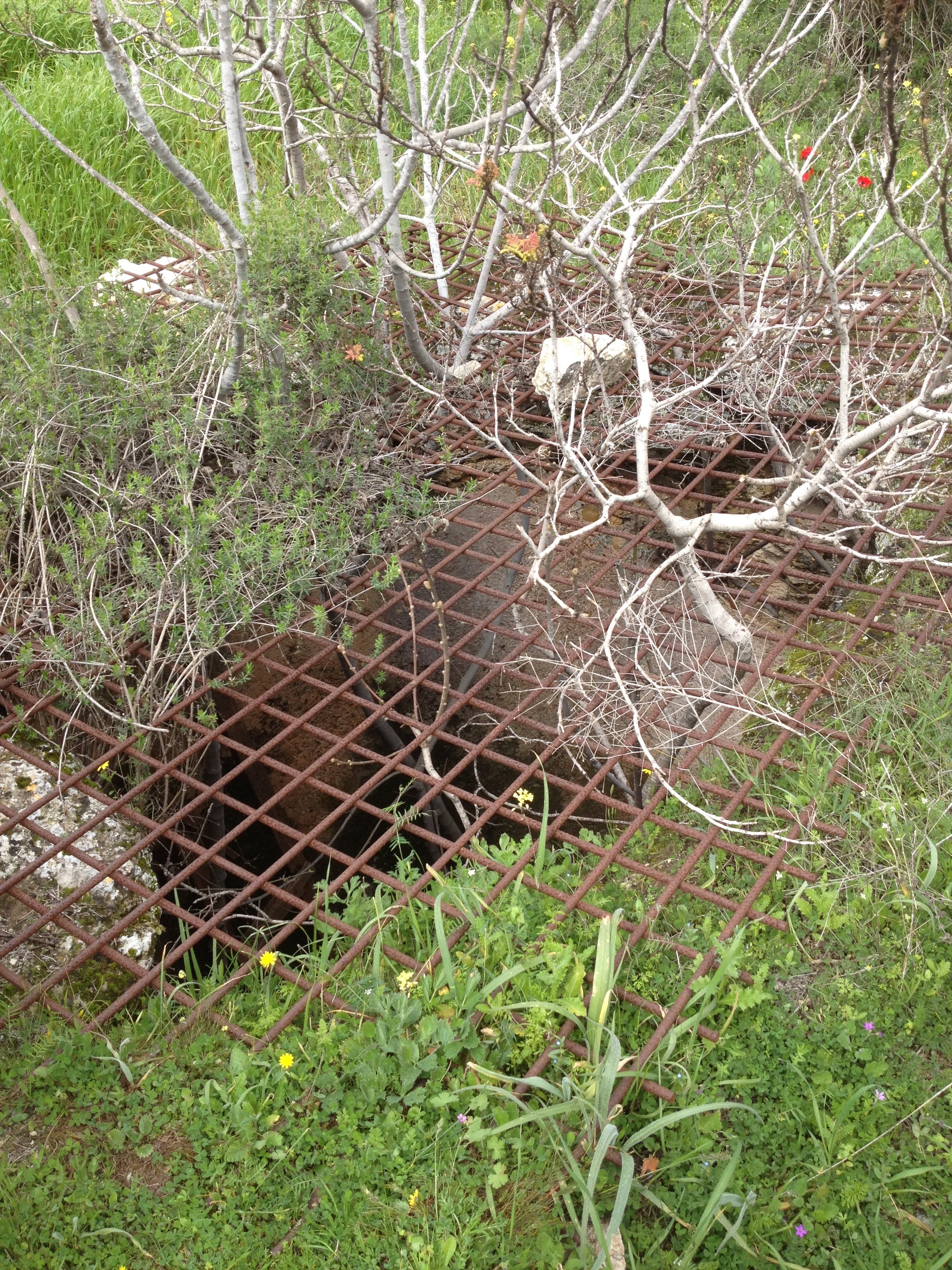
the well at the site

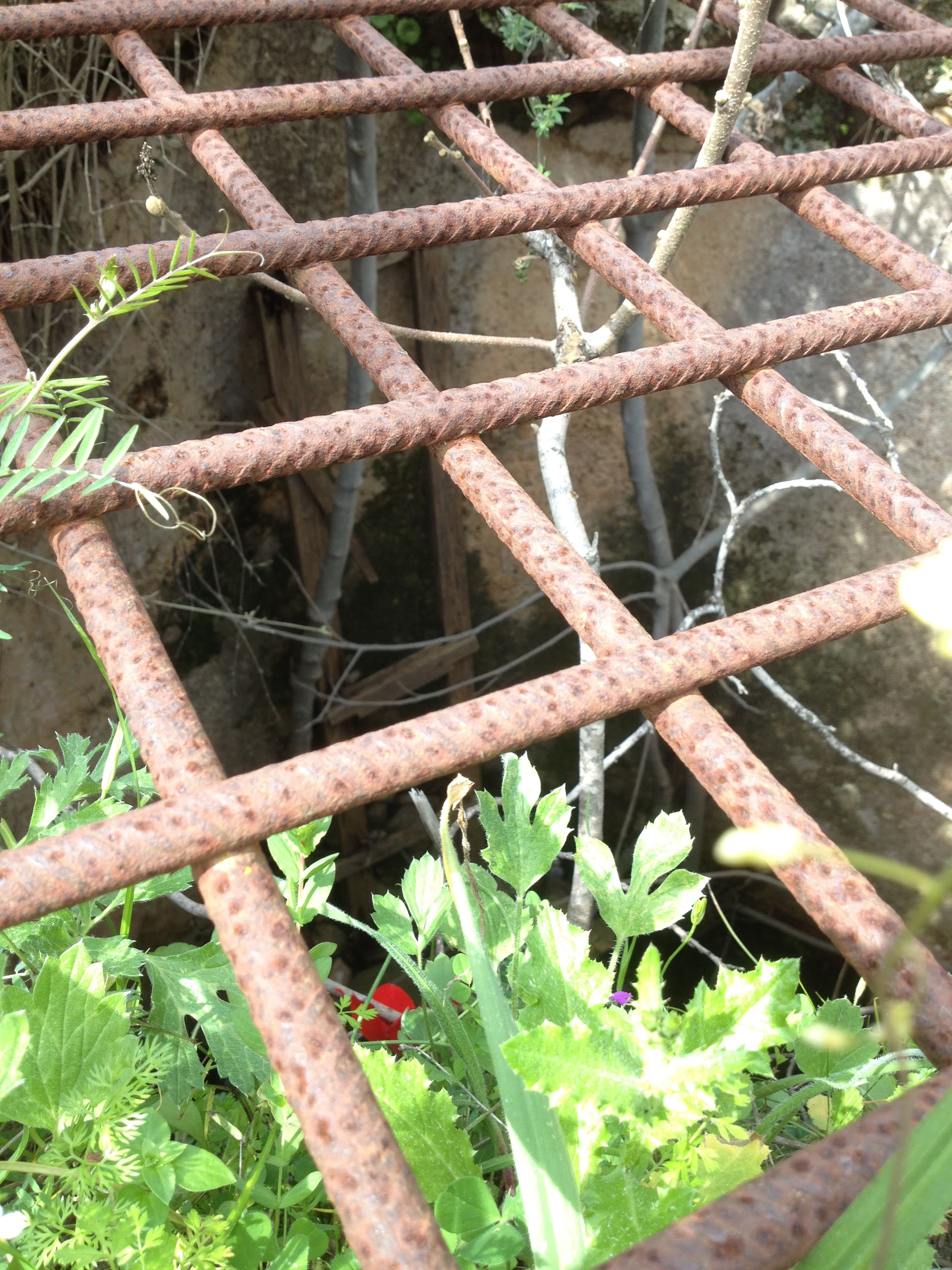
the closeup of the well

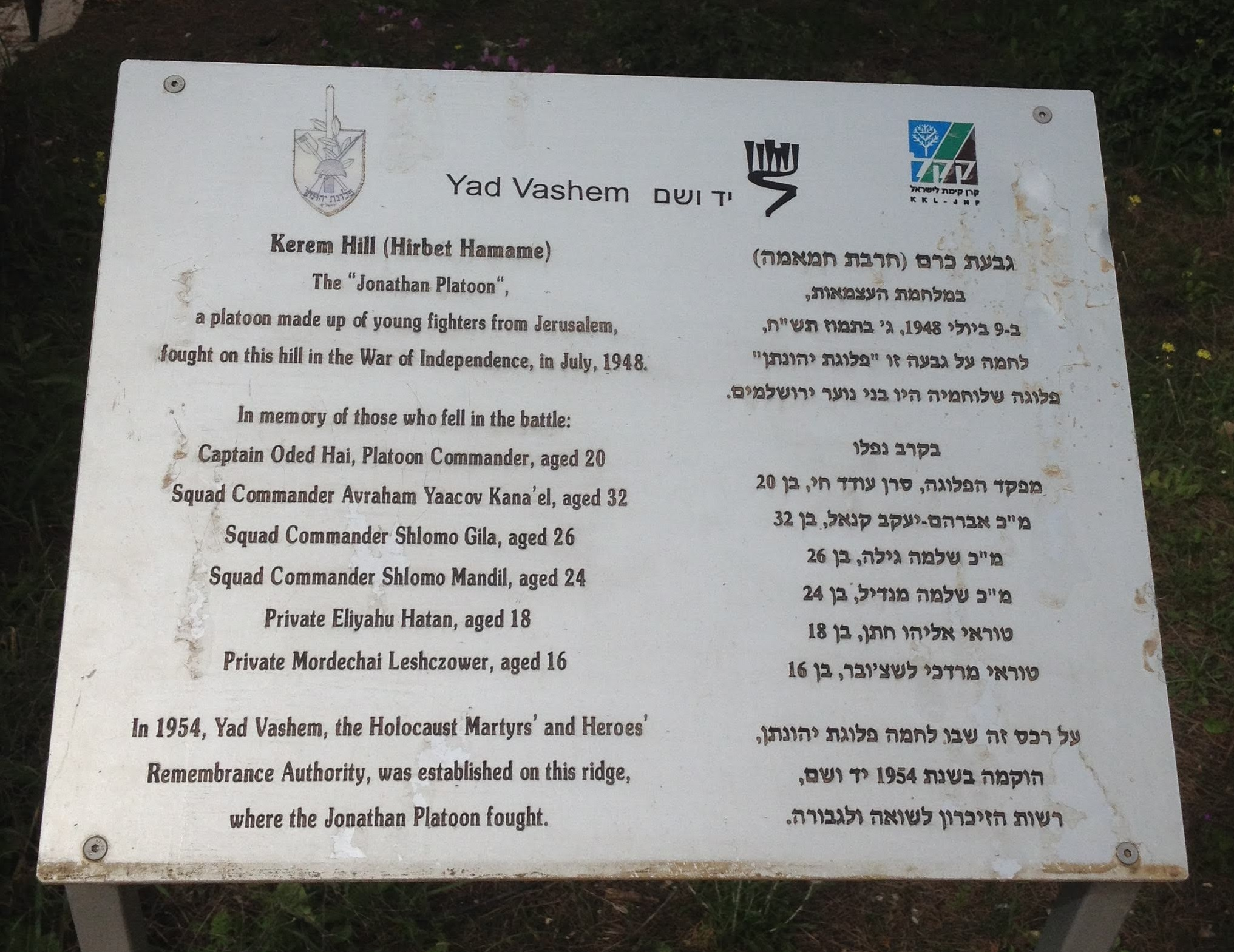
the plaque at the site
