= Avner Shalev =

Israeli general (born 1939)

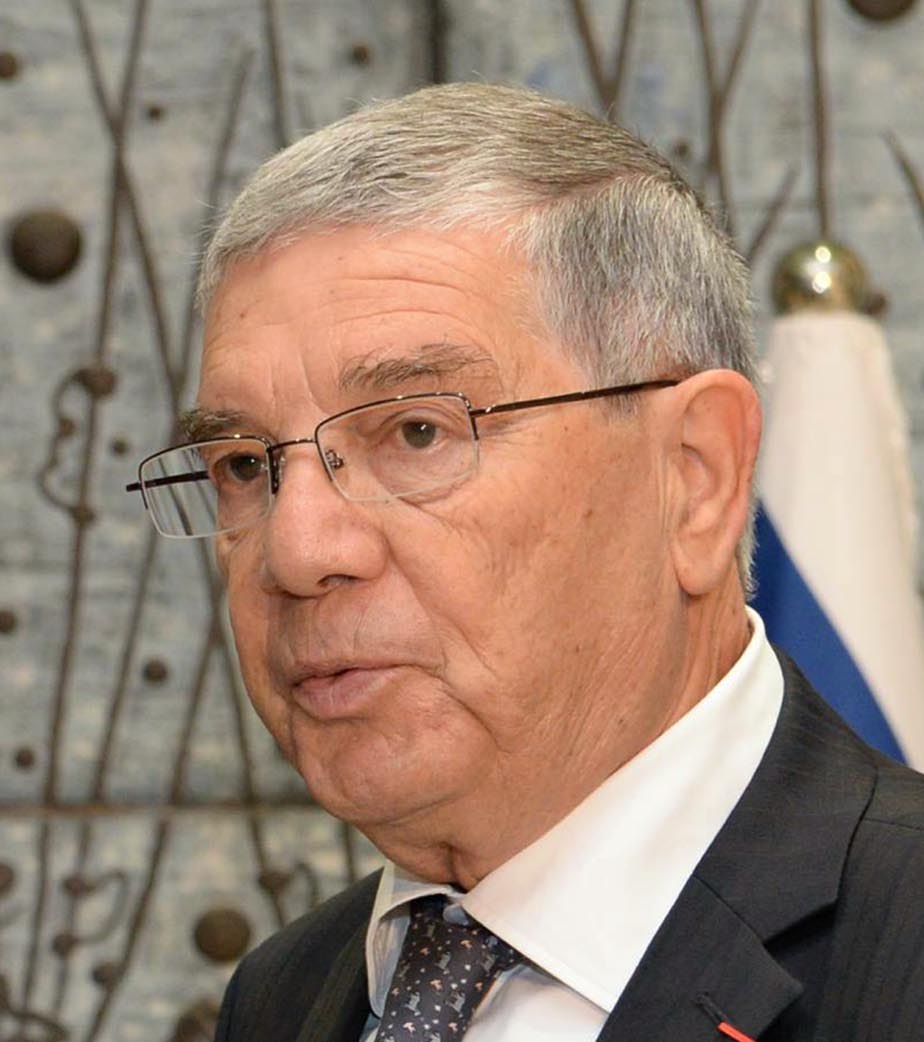
Shalev in 2016

Avner Shalev (Hebrew: אבנר שלו; born 1939) was the chairman of the Yad Vashem Directorate of The Holocaust Martyrs' and Heroes' Remembrance Authority from 1993 to 2021.

== Life course ==
=== Service in the IDF ===
From 1956 through 1980, Shalev served in the Israel Defense Forces (IDF), eventually retiring as a Brigadier General. He commenced his military service in the infantry, first as a foot soldier and then as an officer in the Six-Day War and other events.

In 1972–1974, including the Yom Kippur War, Shalev served as Head of the Bureau of the then Chief of Staff, Major General David Elazar. Shalev was part of the international military and political negotiations that followed the war, including the famous Kilometer 101 accords with Egyptian General Gamassi, which eventually led to the Israel–Egypt peace treaty.

Following the conclusion of the war, Shalev served in the IDF's Education Corps, becoming Israel's Chief Education Officer. This position included command of IDF Radio, and the task of restoring public confidence in the IDF's abilities. He increased the study of the IDF's battle heritage and combat values, and promoted the leadership training of commanders. Shalev established the Education Corps' central officers' training base and advanced the development of core theory and practice for cultivating Israeli military leadership.

=== Director of the Culture Authority ===
Following his retirement from military service, Shalev assumed the position of Director of the Culture Authority in the Ministry of Education and Culture, as well as Chairman of the National Council of Culture and Art. He also served on the boards of a wide range of Israeli museums and cultural institutions. Within these capacities, Shalev was responsible for the formulation and implementation of national policy regarding culture and the arts, and for advancing Israel's ties in these areas with other nations around the world. Among other policies, Shalev earmarked public funding of cultural activities for schoolchildren. He also transformed the Antiquities Department into a national Antiquities Authority. Shalev helped found the Sam Spiegel Film and Television School in Jerusalem.

Shalev set up an inter-departmental unit devoted to the absorption of immigrant artists. Its operation facilitated the founding of multiple cultural entities, such as the Ra'anana Orchestra and the Gesher Theater.

== Yad Vashem ==
In 1993 Avner Shalev was appointed Chairman of the Directorate of Yad Vashem which received the Israel Prize and Princess of Asturias Awards during his tenure. He and Yad Vashem were presented with the French Legion of Honour by President Sarkozy at the Élysée Palace in October 2007.

Under Shalev's leadership Yad Vashem was transformed into a leading Israeli and international authority on Holocaust remembrance, documentation, research and education. He established the International School for Holocaust Studies and the International Institute for Holocaust Research. Additionally, Shalev sought to provide better access to fact-based information about the Holocaust by developing and enriching Yad Vashem online presence, available in multiple languages.

As chairman of Yad Vashem Shalev dealt with the controversy over Pope Pius XII, and with the Museum's complicated relations with the Roman Catholic Church. He sought better access to Vatican archives for the period of Monsignor Pacelli's papacy. He retired in February 2021 after having announced in June his intention to retire by the end of the 2020.

He was succeeded as chairman by Dani Dayan in August 2021.
