= Gadna (Israel) =

Israeli military program

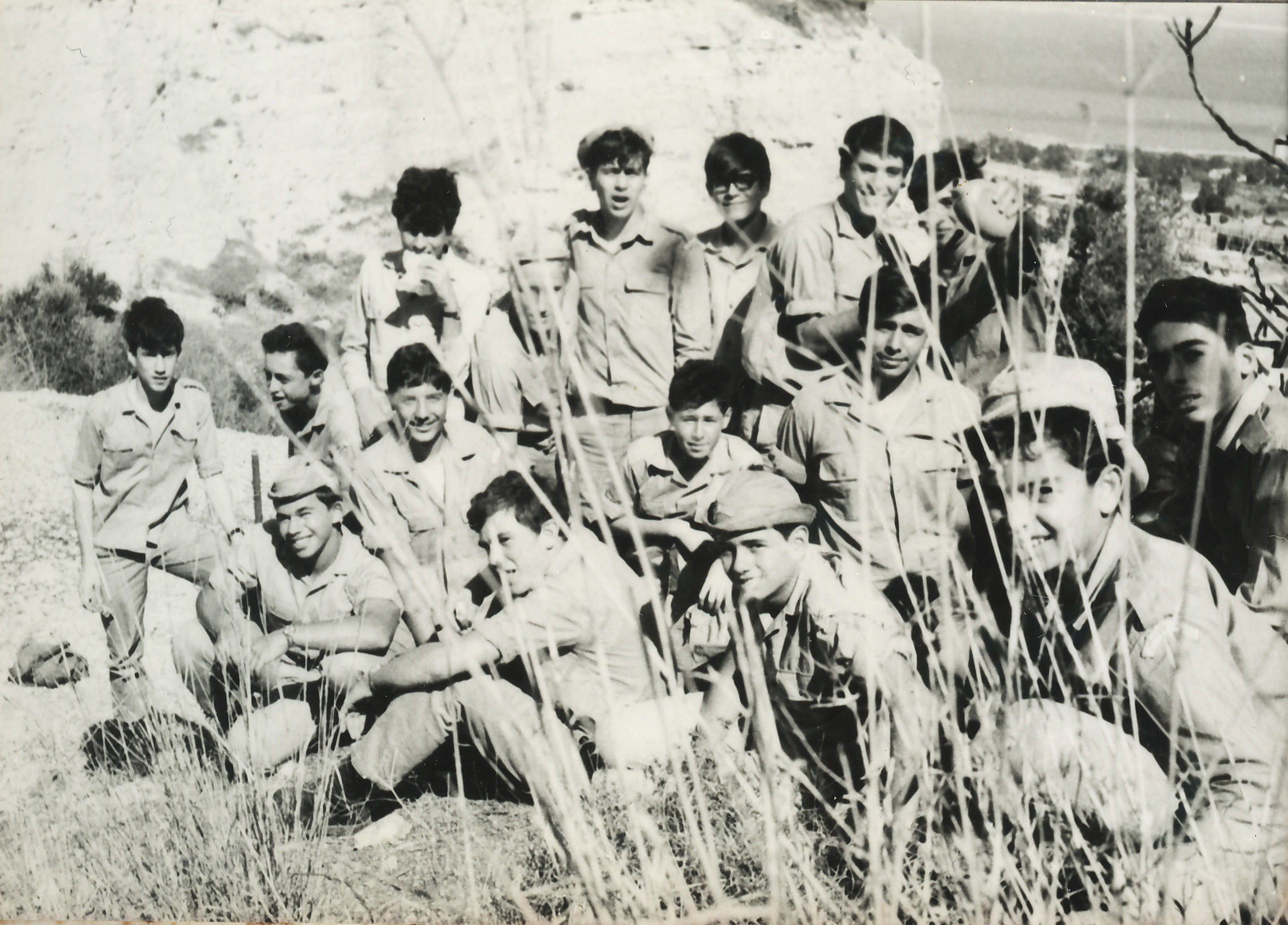
10th graders at Gadna class, 1969

Gadna (Hebrew: גדנ״ע) is an Israeli military program that prepares young people for military service in the Israel Defense Forces. It was established before the foundation of the State of Israel and was anchored in law in 1949. Today it is a one-week program of discipline and military training usually under commanders serving with the Nahal infantry brigade. Gadna hosts an estimated 19,000 Israeli youth annually, as well as numerous foreign youths.

== History ==
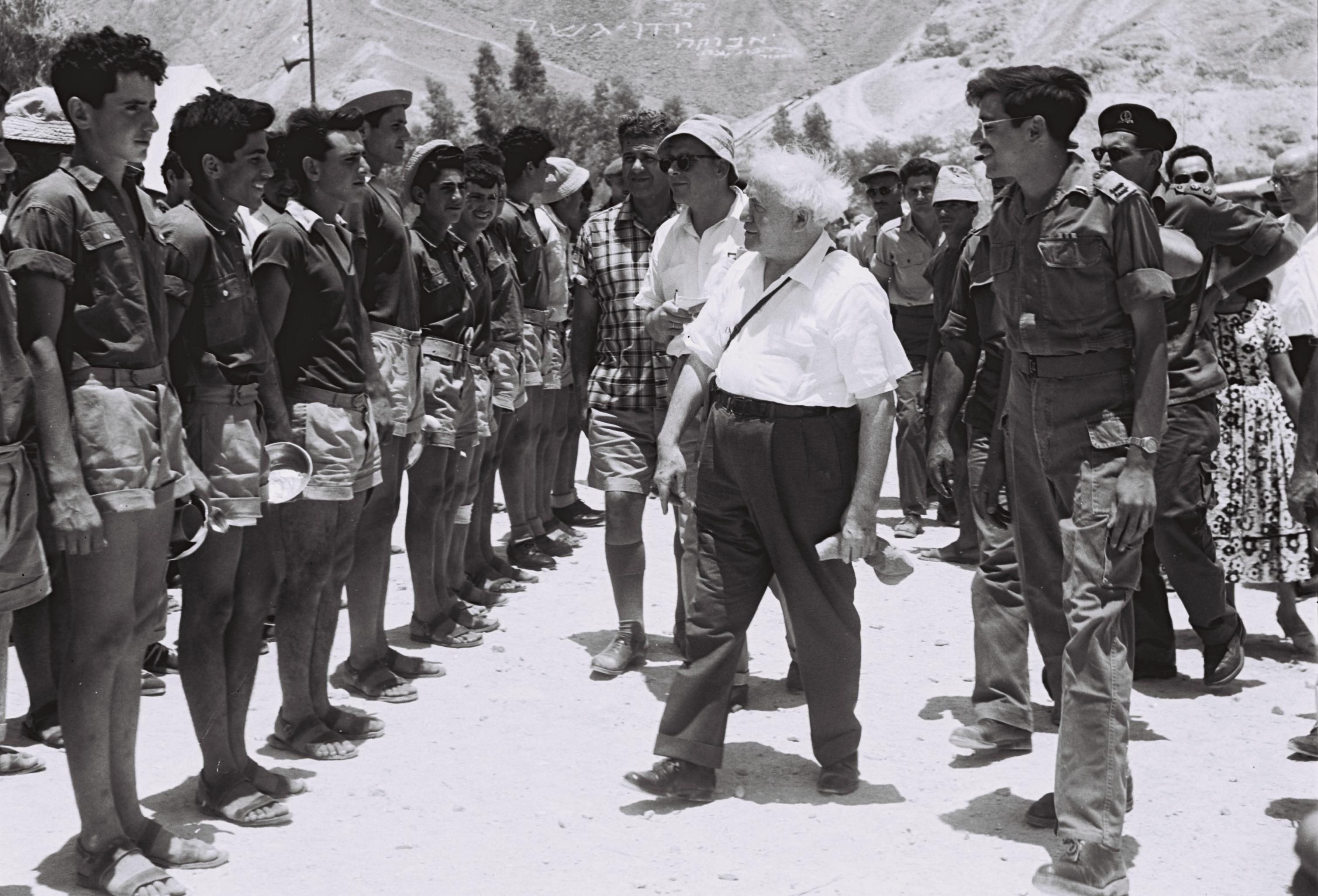
David Ben-Gurion visiting a Gadna base in Be'er Ora (1957)

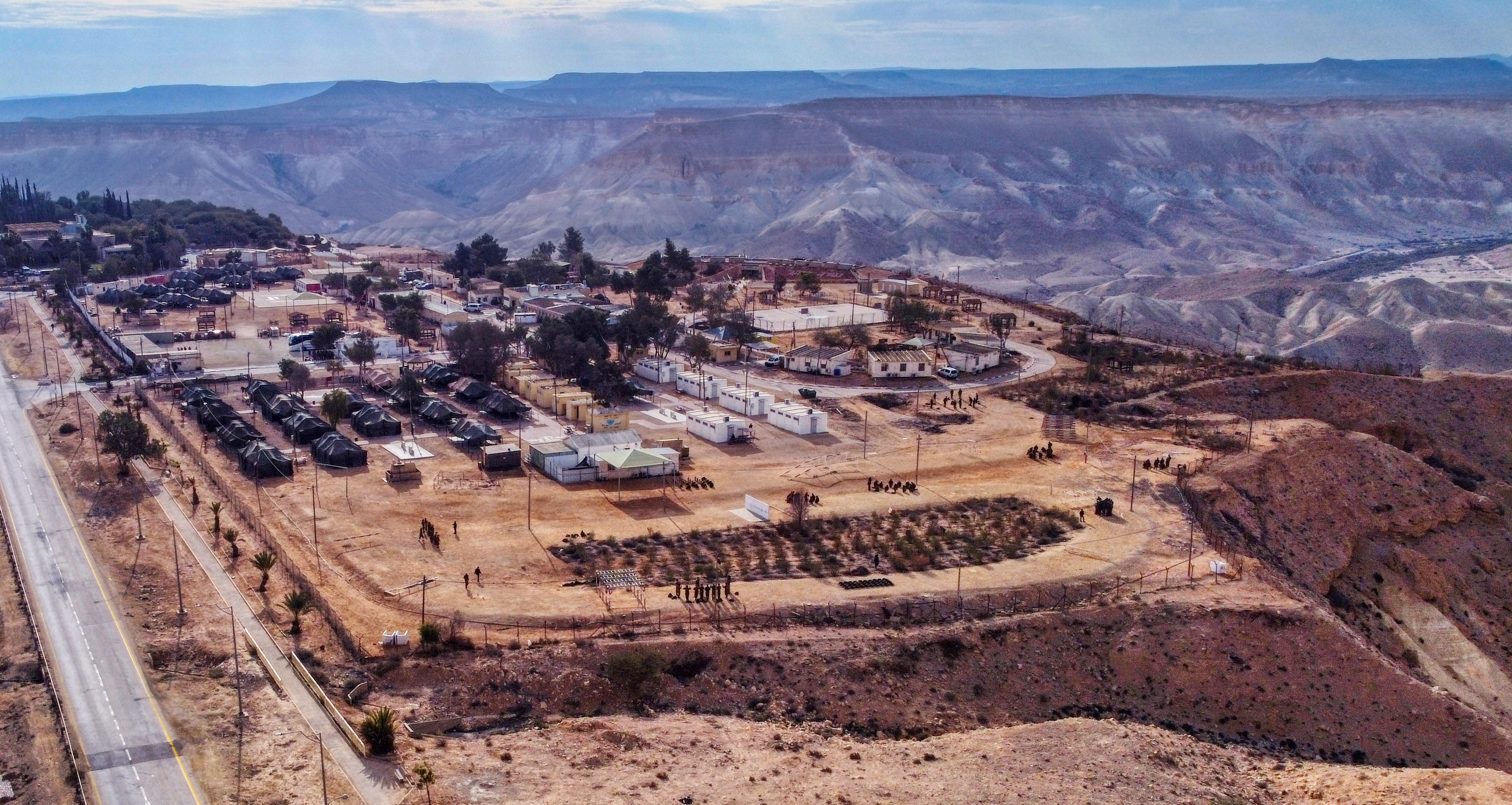
Gadna Sde Boker

Gadna, an abbreviation for Gdudei No'ar (גדודי נוער; lit. youth battalions), was an organization for youth created before the Israeli Declaration of Independence. Alongside preliminary training for military service, Gadna clubs taught Zionist history, promoted love of the Land of Israel and encouraged members to engage in farming and volunteerism. Social activities included readings of ideological material from Labor Zionist newspapers and publications.

The program was established in the early 1940s by the Haganah, which became the core of the IDF. Thousands of Gadna members fought as child soldiers in the 1948 Arab–Israeli War. The Jonathan Company was formed mostly of Gadna members.

In June 1949, the Knesset passed a law requiring men and women who were physically and mentally fit to serve in the military from the age of 18. The law also provided for the establishment of the Gadna semi-military framework to prepare high school students for military service.

== Insignia ==
The commanders, the "Mefakdim" or "Mefakdot" (מפקדים or מפקדות, masculine and feminine plurals), who are sergeants and officers, wear either the green beret of the Nahal infantry brigade, or the black beret if they are not part of the Nahal. Both Nahal and non-Nahal commanders wear the Gadna tag on their left shoulder on the Aleph uniform (the representative uniform). The commanders wear a brown braid on their left shoulders. Trainees in Gadna are issued uniforms consisting of fatigues or B uniform ("Bet Uniforms", מדי ב) pants and a shirt, and a military belt. Trainees do not receive military shoes. Upon arrival, if they do not have a hat, trainees are given hats which must be worn at all times. Trainees with long hair, both boys and girls, must always tie their hair.

Living in army tents or barracks, the youth are organized into squads. The squad has two leaders chosen by the commander. The highest youth is taken under the base officer's wing and wears a braid on their left shoulder, or multi-colored (striped) epaulets. If they wear the braid they wear the same color epaulet as the rest of their unit. The second highest youth commander is the sergeant. They wear special epaulets, usually black, and they never wear a braid.

== Structure ==
The Gadna program is subordinate to the Magen division of the Education and Youth Corps.

=== Bases ===
Numerous bases were related to the Gadna program over the years, although as of 2020, only 2 operational Gadna bases remain:

- Sdeh Boker Gadna Base, in the Negev desert
- Tzalmon Gadna Base, in the Lower Galilee

== Controversies ==
While the Gadna program has been criticized as "overly militaristic" by certain educators and professors in Israel, the Education and Youth Corps has prepared a program which would see more militaristic and combatant values inserted into the lessons conducted in the program, although less emphasis will be put on the physical aspect of the program.

== See also ==
- Service Year
