= Aharon Ze'ev =

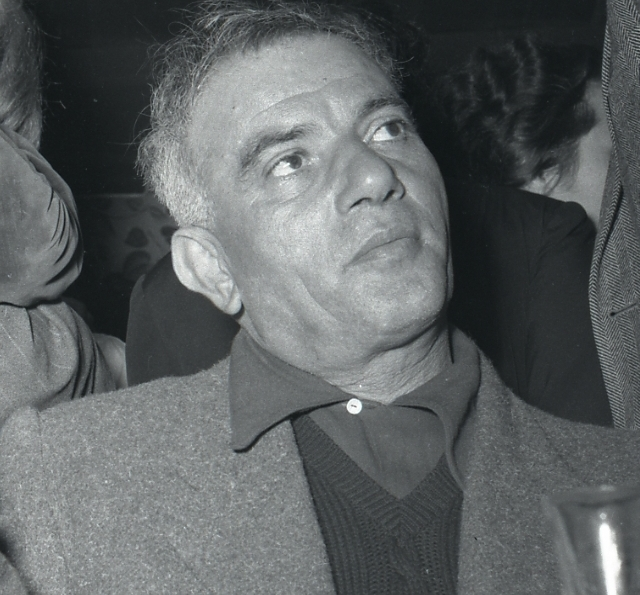
Aharon Ze'ev, 1949

Aharon Ze'ev (Hebrew: אהרן זאב; April 28, 1900–October 10, 1968) was an Israeli poet, writer (including writing for children), editor, and educator, a founder and chief education officer of the Education and Youth Corps of the IDF (1950-1963). He was born Aharon Ze'ev Weintraub in Sokołów Podlaski, Poland, then part of the Russian Empire to the family of a merchant Zvi Weintraub. In order to emigrate to Palestine (in 1925), he obtained the documents under the surname Czarniecki and used this surname until the establishment of the state of Israel.

== Awards and recognition ==
- 1965: Israel Prize for education
- The Ze'ev Prize for children's and youth literature is named after him
