= Pre-Army Service Year =

Israeli voluntary service program

The Pre-Army Service Year (Hebrew: שנת שירות, Shnat Sherut), abbreviated Shin-Shin (Hebrew: ש״ש), is a one-year voluntary service program for Israeli high school graduates prior to their mandatory service in the Israel Defense Forces (IDF).

Unlike gap years offered in other countries, the Service Year is entirely devoted towards volunteer work, and offers no material reward for participants. Service Year volunteers work full-time in a various fields: assisting development towns and disadvantaged communities, residential schools for youth at risk, youth movements, nature/ecological organizations, and many other civic organizations and projects. Through the Jewish Agency for Israel, some spend up to ten months of the year volunteering in the UK, Canada, the United States, and other countries.

In order to participate in a Service Year, prospective volunteers must defer their compulsory military service. However, the number of deferments allowed by the IDF is limited, making acceptance into the Service Year program selective and competitive.

Conscription rates among Service Year graduates are nearly 100%, and many of the volunteers are accepted into the most elite units of the IDF.

== See also ==
- Gadna (Israel)
