= Eli (Israeli settlement) =

Israeli settlement in the West Bank

Eli: עֵלִי (Hebrew)
- Israeli settlement
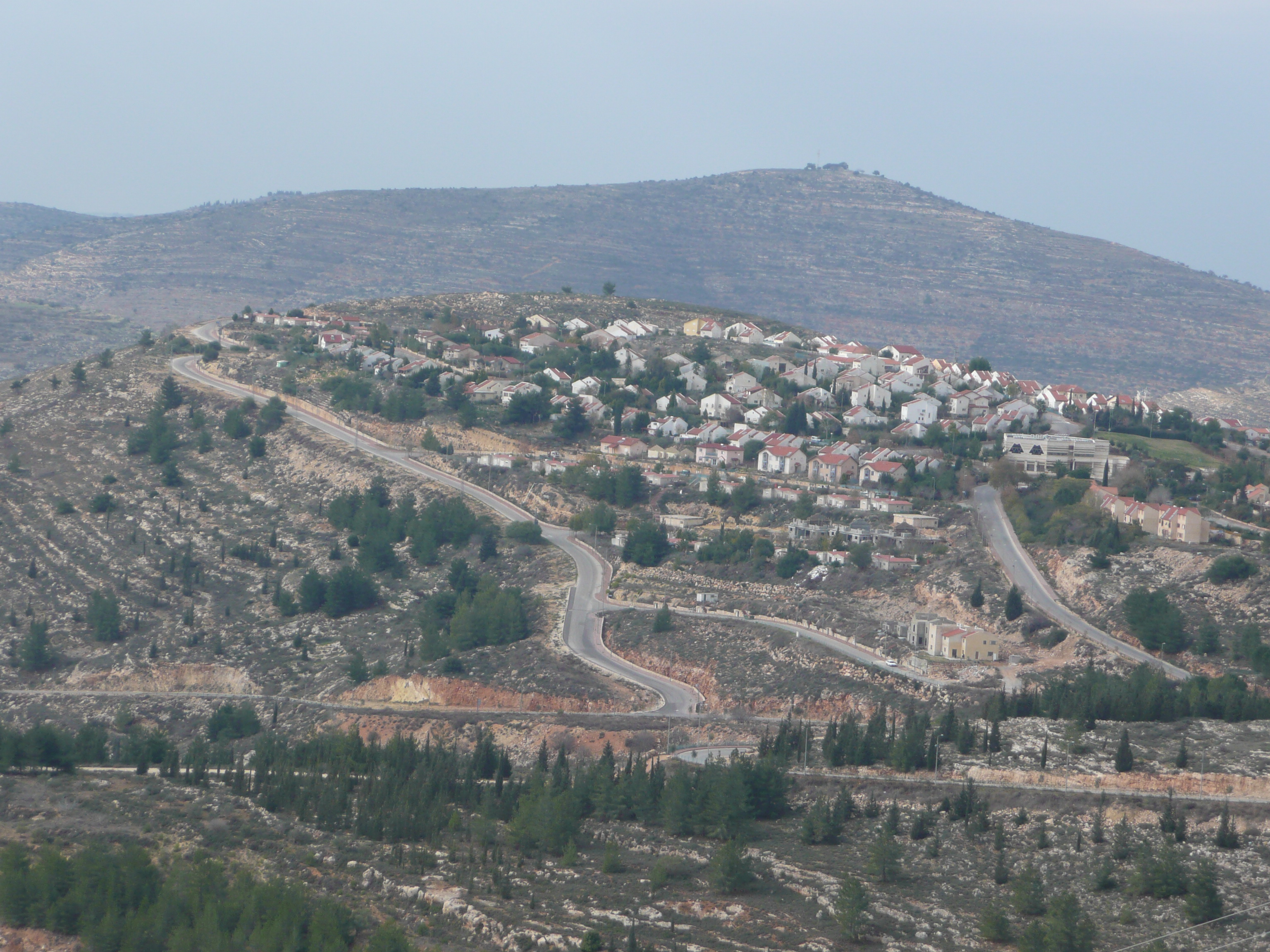

- Location within the Central West Bank Location within the West Bank Location within State of Palestine
- Coordinates: 32°4′17″N 35°15′55″E
- Country: Palestine
- District: Judea and Samaria Area
- Council: Mateh Binyamin
- Region: West Bank
- Founded: 1984
- Population (2024): 4,978
- Website: www.eli.co.il

Eli (Hebrew: עֵלִי) is a large Israeli settlement in the West Bank organized as a community settlement, located on Highway 60, north of Ramallah, between the Palestinian villages of As-Sawiya and Qaryut.

The international community considers Israeli settlements in the West Bank illegal under international law, but the Israeli government disputes this.

== History ==
Eli, named after the Biblical high priest of the Israelites, was established on 11 September 1984, when three families moved into recently placed buildings. It was the first settlement to be attempted without a core group of families. Several families from Ofra, Kokhav HaShahar, and Shilo were persuaded to come for at least a year while more families would be found. The settlement was originally called 'Givat Levona' after the adjacent settlement Ma'ale Levona. The Amana website states that the initial vision was creating 'one long territorial contiguity' of Israeli settlers between Eli and both Shiloh and Ma'ale Levona.

According to the ARIJ, Israel confiscated land from two nearby Palestinian villages in order to construct Eli: 1,551 dunums from As-Sawiya and 623 dunums from Qaryut.

In recent years the town has evolved into the municipal center for the Shilo area settlement bloc.

== Bnei David ==
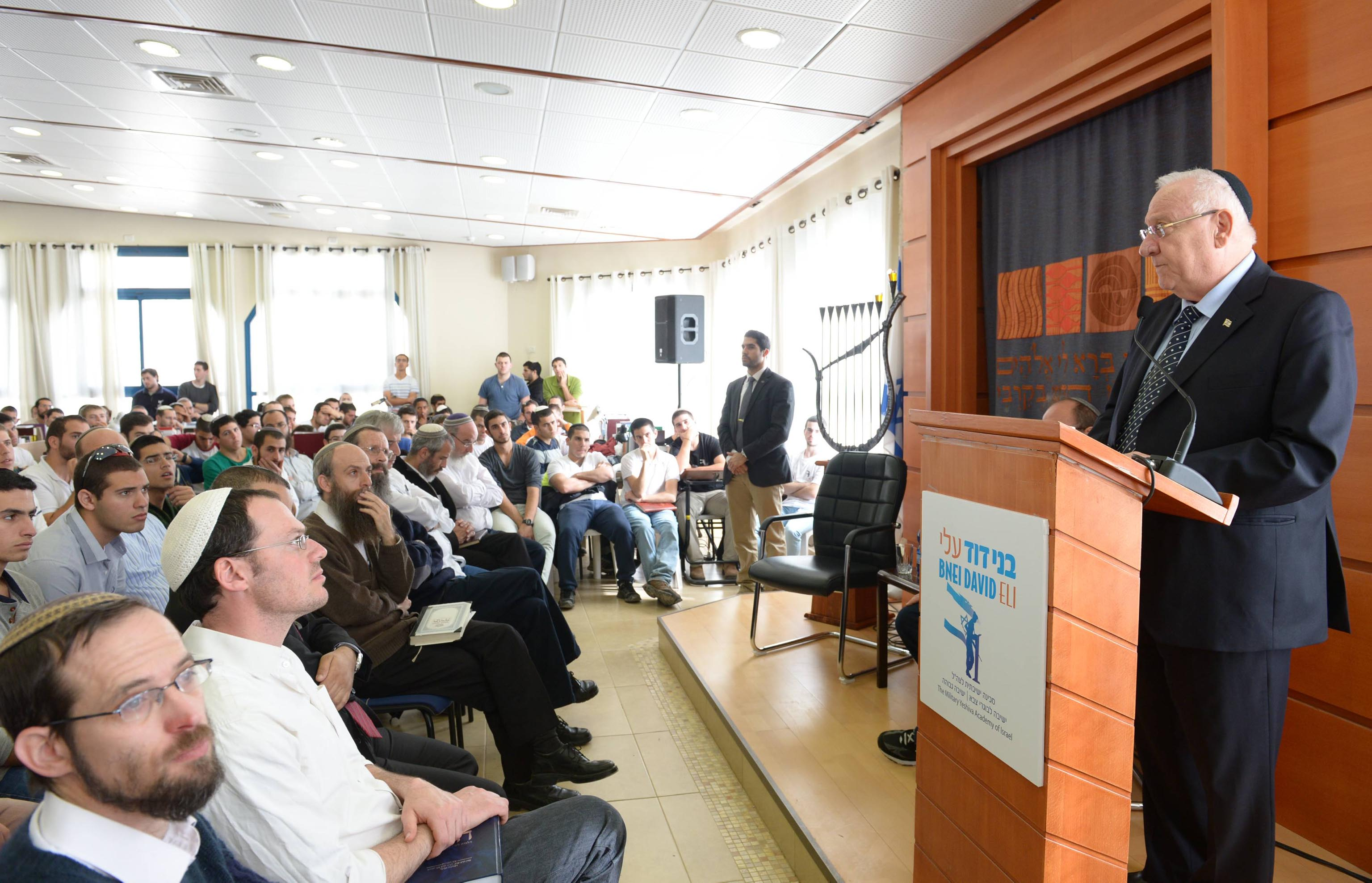
President of Israel Reuven Rivlin at Bnei David

Eli is home to Bnei David, a pre-military Mechina academy. Bnei David is the first pre-military Orthodox Mechina academy, having been founded by Eli Sadan and Yigal Levinstein as such in 1988. Many of the graduates have reached high rank in the Israel Defense Forces (IDF). It is an integral part of Eli, as many of the rabbis, administrators, graduates, and students live in the settlement. There are currently over 500 students studying at Bnei David, and over 2,500 graduates, over 40% of whom became officers. A majority served in either combat or elite units. The yeshiva also offers post-army academic programs. Shimon Peres has praised the academy, calling it a "pride for the country".

Co-founder Yigal Levinstein went on record in 2016 claiming gay people were 'sick and perverted' and that drafting women into the IDF deprived them of their Jewishness. In 2018, instructor Yosef Kelner asserted that women had feeble minds and a reduced spirituality. In April 2019, the head of the school, Eliezer Kashtiel, was filmed lecturing to students on the genetic inferiority of gentiles—specifically Palestinians—on their stupidity, and the need for them to be enslaved. He endorsed racism, and the superiority of the Jewish people. Another instructor, Giora Redler, stated that the Holocaust was a divine punishment to make Jews leave the diaspora, that Adolf Hitler was correct 'in every word he said ... he was just on the wrong side,' and that humanism was the real holocaust, not Hitler's murdering of Jews.

Graduates of Bnei David who died during their IDF service include Roi Klein, Emmanuel Moreno, and Amihai Merhavia.

== Expansion plans ==
In 2013, the Israeli Civil Administration published a master plan (no. 237) which, if approved, would legitimize hundreds of the structures in Eli and incorporate Eli's four outposts, from the land of Palestinian villages As-Sawiye and Al-Lubban ash-Sharqiya, and Quaryut. It covers 1,000 dunams, but would allow the expansion of other outposts to embrace 6,000 dunams, including privately owned Palestinian land. Within the plan's map, there are 7 Palestinian enclaves, where Palestinians may carry out agricultural projects, but are denied the right to build. The plan depends on declaring collectively owned Palestinian village lands in question as ownerless under Ottoman law, a classification which allows them to be defined as "state property" reserved for Jews alone.

== Voting Patterns ==
In the 2026 election, 82 percent of voters in Eli voted for the parties of the right-wing coalition led by Benjamin Netanyahu, while 3 percent voted for the parties of the center-left coalition led by Gadi Eisenkot and 0.05 percent voted for the Arab parties. An additional 0.6 percent voted for the Reservists, and 7.2 percent voted for Amcha Yisrael. 63 percent of voters voted for the Religious Zionist Party. Voter turnout increased 21 percent from the 2022 election.

== Israeli-Palestinian conflict ==
In 2013, representatives of the nearby Palestinian village of Qaryut blamed Eli settlers for an alleged uprooting of more than 100 olive trees on their property. In January 2014, an Eli resident claimed to have photographed Palestinians chopping down an olive tree which a later report on Ma'an news blamed 'settlers' for the incident. In August 2015, a gas station was firebombed on Route 60 near Eli. Later, two Palestinian from Awarta, members of PFLP, claimed the attack was a retaliation for the firebombing at Duma.

In August 2024, the nearby Palestinian town of Jit suffered an attack from Israeli settlers. Local eyewitnesses in Jit stated that the attackers came from the settlement of Eli.
