= Eli Sadan =

Israeli Orthodox rabbi (born 1948)

Eliezer "Eli" Sadan
- אליעזר "אלי" סדן
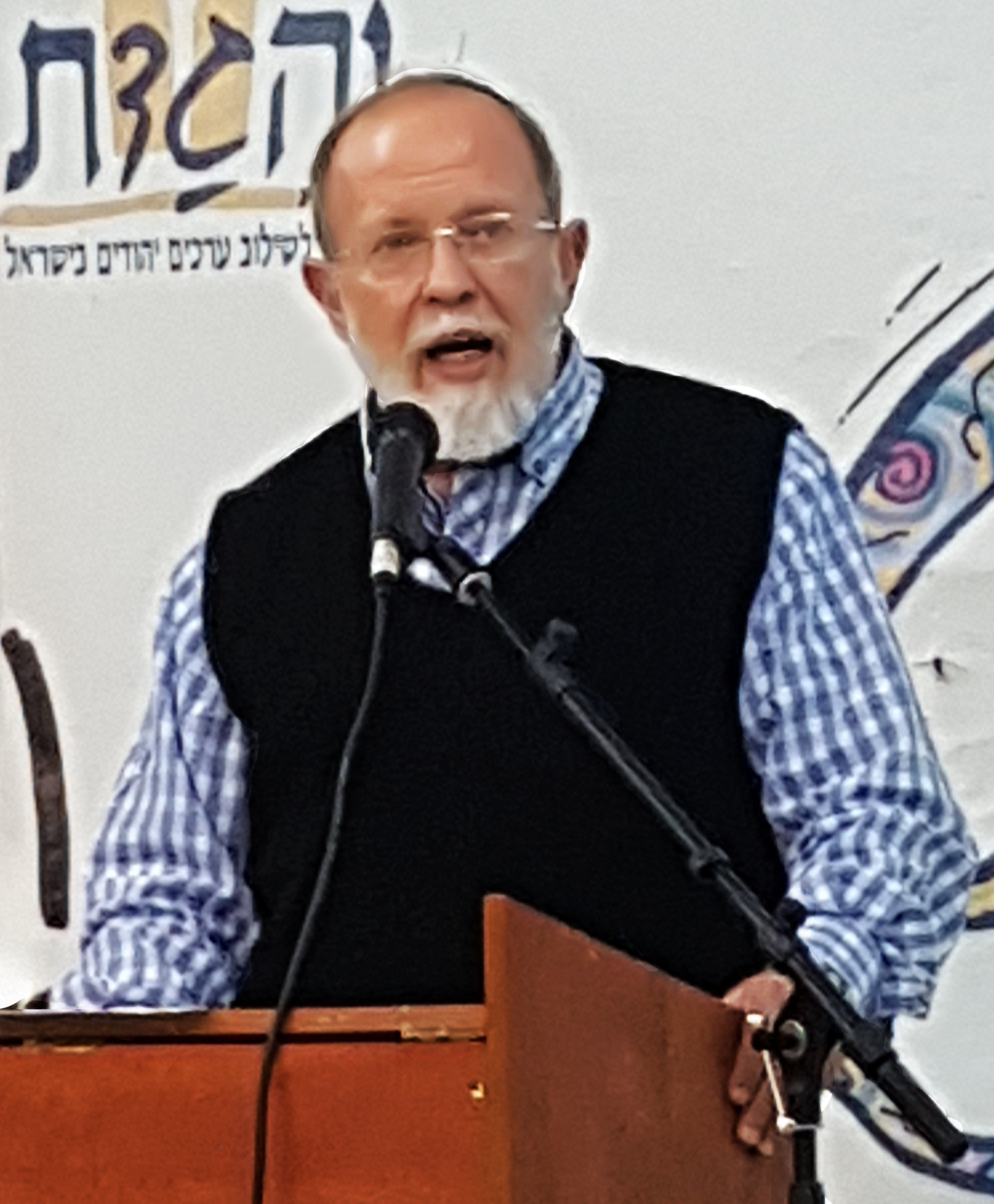
- Eli Sadan in 2018
- Born: May 13, 1948 (age 78); Budapest, Hungary
- Occupations: Orthodox rabbi, founder of the "Bnei David" mechina
- Known for: Founding the first pre-military preparatory program in Israel
- Children: 12
- Awards: Israel Prize for Lifetime Achievement (2016)

Rabbi Eliezer "Eli" Sadan (Hebrew: אליעזר "אלי" סדן; born May 13, 1948) is an Israeli Orthodox rabbi, and the founder and head of the mechina academy Bnei David, the first pre-military preparatory program in Israel. Sadan is a recipient of the Israel Prize for Lifetime Achievement for special contribution to society and to the state.

== Biography ==
Eli Sadan was born May 13, 1948 in Budapest, Hungary. His parents, Rivka Kuti Annemann and Shalom Erwin Sadan, were Holocaust survivors. His father underwent a death march, and spent about six months in the Auschwitz extermination camp. After the war, his parents completed their studies in Hungary. They immigrated to Israel when Eli was one year old.

Before joining the Israel Defense Force, Sadan studied for four months at Yeshivat Kerem B'Yavneh. He served in the Paratroopers Brigade. After completing his military service, he began studying physics at the Hebrew University of Jerusalem. A year later, he switched to Yeshivat Mercaz HaRav Kook, where he studied for 13 years and became a student of rabbis Zvi Yehuda Kook and Zvi Thau. Rabbi Sadan is one of their leading students; like them, he believes that the state of Israel is Atchalta De'Geulah. During his studies, he was asked by Rabbi Kook to assist in establishing Moshav Keshet in the Golan Heights, and in establishing a core of Torah scholars in Eilat.

Together with Rabbi Tzvi Tau, he was delegated by Rabbi Zvi Yehuda with regarding to prisoners of Zion, among them Natan Sharansky. They even held a secret telephone conversation before Sharansky entered the Russian prison. Afterwards, Sadan held several meetings with US officials, in order to secure Sharansky's release.

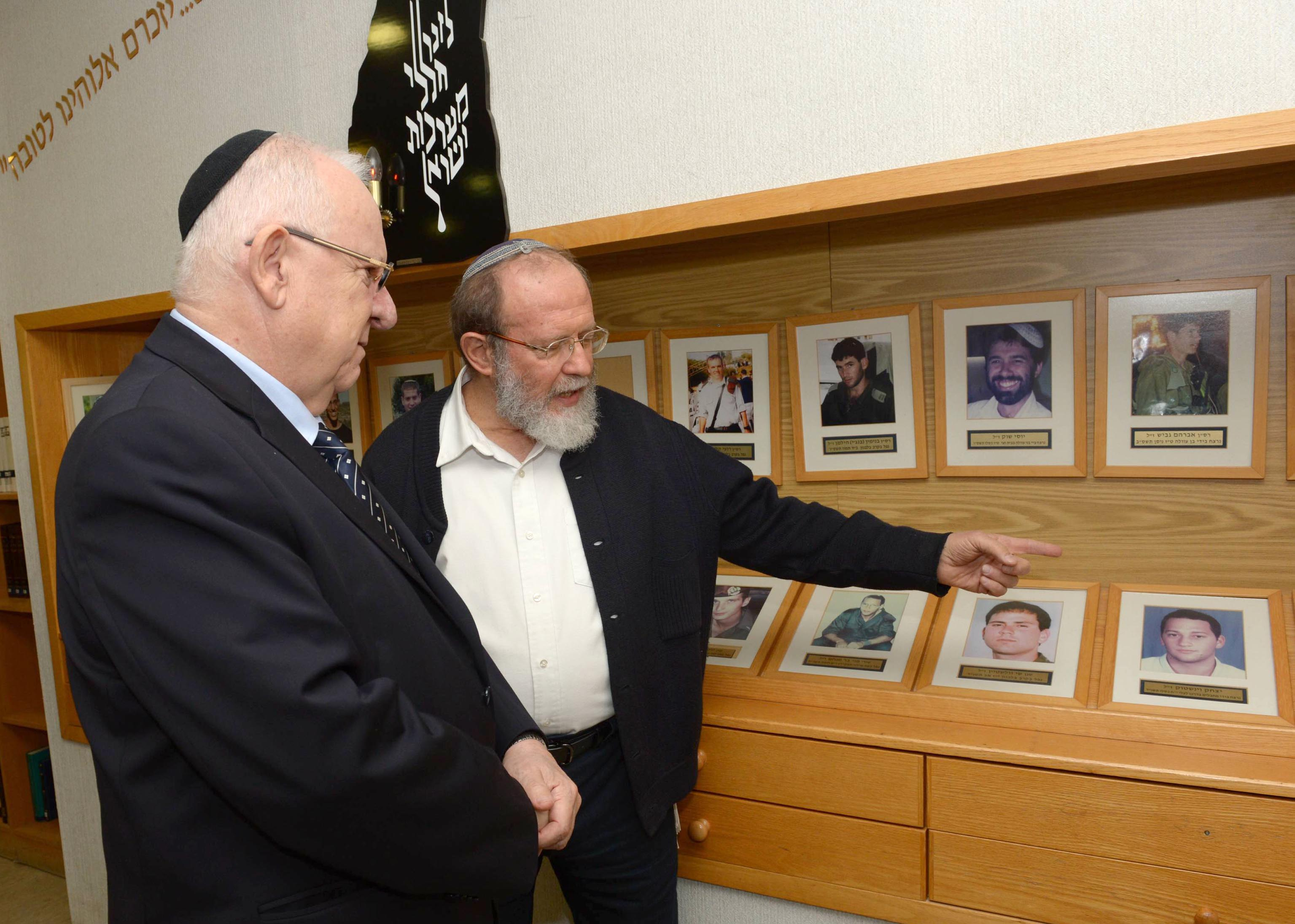
Rabbi Eli Sadan with President of Israel Reuven Rivlin at the Bnei David Academy

In 1988, Sadan and Rabbi Yigal Levinstein were approached by Amram Mitzna to establish the first pre-military preparatory program (mechina). The mechina is named "Bnei David", and is located in Eli. It was established due to some religious soldiers leaving their religious frameworks during military service. Its goal is to prepare Orthodox men for three year service in the IDF, while encouraging them to serve in combat units and as officers. This track did not exist in the Hesder yeshivas. Rabbi Sadan also initiated the establishment of the first secular mechina program, Nachshon Mechina, established in 1997.

In 2016, Rabbi Sadan was awarded the Israel Prize for Lifetime Achievement due to his special contribution to society and to the State of Israel.

Sadan is married, and has twelve children.
