= Education and Youth Corps =

- חיל החינוך והנוער
- Education and Youth Corps insignia
- Active: 1948–present
- Country: Israel
- Allegiance: Israel Defense Forces

Commanders
- Current commander: Tat Aluf Ophir Levios

Insignia
- Flag

- Beret cap

The Education and Youth Corps (Hebrew: חיל החינוך והנוער, Heil HaHinuh VeHaNo'ar) is a corps of the Israel Defense Forces' (IDF) Personnel Directorate responsible for the education of IDF personnel. Its mission purpose it to instruct and develop "national values" among Israeli servicemembers.

== Goal and designation ==
According to former Chief Education Officer Avner Shalev, the aims of the education system in the IDF are to increase the motivation and morale of the troops and units. This is achieved by introducing cultural activities into the lives of soldiers, teaching them about the country and its values—both national and universal—as well as by teaching them about the nature of their duties as soldiers and citizens of the state.

== Structure ==
The Education and Youth Corps is divided into two main brigades - the Magen division and the education division - as well as 6 independent units directly subordinate to the Chief Education Officer:

- The Jerusalem College
- Planning and organization branch
- Education and youth training base (בה"ד החינוך והנוער, Bahad HaHinukh VeHaNo'ar)
- The School for Leadership (בית הספר למנהיגות, Beit HaSefer LeManhigut, abbr. Bislam)
- The army weekly magazine Bamahane
- Israeli Army Radio (גלי צה"ל, Galei Tzahal, abbr. Galatz)

=== Magen division ===
The Magen (an abbreviation for Morot-Hayalot (teacher soldiers), Makam, Gadna and Nahal), comprises four IDF education programs:

- Mak'am (an abbreviation for Merkaz Kidum Ukhlusiyot Meyuhadot - Center for the Advancement of Special Population Groups), a program initiated by Rafael Eitan to call up and support soldiers who would otherwise not be called up, such as those with serious educational deficiencies (lack of compulsory education), long criminal histories, etc. These are termed 'adaptation problems' in the IDF, and those with a rating of 40-60 are considered Mak'am youth. The Mak'am base is called Havat HaShomer and located in the north of the country, and trains those Mak'am youth with the most serious problems.
- Teacher soldiers, a program to train soldiers to become teachers in the civilian sector.
- Gadna, short paramilitary training programs for high school youth. The Gadna program has 3 such training bases - Tzalmon in the north, Ju'ara in the center, and Sde Boker in the south of the country.
- Nahal Nucleus (גרעין נח"ל, Gar'in Nahal), another pre-military-age program.

Mihve Alon, a training base for new immigrants not proficient in the Hebrew language, is also subordinate to the Magen division.

=== Education division ===
The education division serves as the professional guide for the other units of the corps, and of the IDF in general. It is divided into 6 branches:

- Mak'am branch
- Education and Hasbara branch
- Culture branch
- Aliyah branch
- Arm and corps branch
- Moriah branch

== Education and youth training base ==
The Education and youth training base, or by its name Sha'arei Avraham (Abraham's gates) was built near the Re'em Junction in the Lachish Valley near Kiryat Mal'akhi.

Many of the soldiers in various roles in the Education Corps get their training in the Youth Education Training Base.

Among these roles:

1. Mashakit Hod מש"קית הו"ד - teaching and command NCO
2. Madan Merhav and Basis מד"ן מרחב ובסיס - a youth guide in the base and region
3. Mashakit Hinukh מש"קית חינוך - education NCO
4. Mashakit Aliya מש"קית עלייה - immigration NCO
5. Military ensemble
6. Museum guides
- The teacher-soldiers who are also a part of the Education Corps don't get their training in the Youth Education Training Base, but in a civic seminary called Ramot Shapira, which is in moshav Beit Meir, next to Jerusalem. this is a result of the "lending agreement" with the Education Minister of Israel.

== Insignia ==
The emblem of the Education and Youth Corps is composed of four stripes integrating into one flame.

Three of them (different shades of blue) represent the three different centers of the corps and the fourth (colored white) represents the headquarters of the corps.

== Chief officers ==
Name	Years as chief officer	Comments
Lieutenant Colonel Yosef Karib	1948–1950	
Colonel Aharon Ze'ev	1950–1963	
Colonel Mordechai Bar-On	1963–1968	former Knesset member
Brigadier General Yitzhak Arad	1968–1972	Director of Yad Vashem, 1972 - 1993
Brigadier General Shaul Givoli	1972–1975	
Brigadier General Amir Betsal'el	1975–1977	
Brigadier General Avner Shalev	1977–1979	Director of Yad Vashem, 1993-2020
Brigadier General Avraham Zohar	1979–1982	
Brigadier General Josef Eldar	1982–1985	
Brigadier General Nehemya Dagan	1985–1988	
Brigadier General Ehud Gross	1988–1991	
Brigadier General Shalom Ben Moshe	1991–1995	
Brigadier General Evrham Asha'hal	1995–1997	
Brigadier General Ran Glika	1997–1999	
Major General Elazar Stern	1999–2004	later, also head of the Human Resources Directorate
Brigadier General Ilan Harari	2004–2007	
Brigadier General Eli Shermeister	2007–2013	
Brigadier General Avner Paz Tzuk	2013–2017	
Brigadier General Tzvika Freizen	2017-2020	
Brigadier General Ophir Levios	2020-2024	
Brigadier General Samuel Bumandil	2024-	

== See also ==
- Mechinat Rabin
