= Nahal =

Israel Defense Forces program

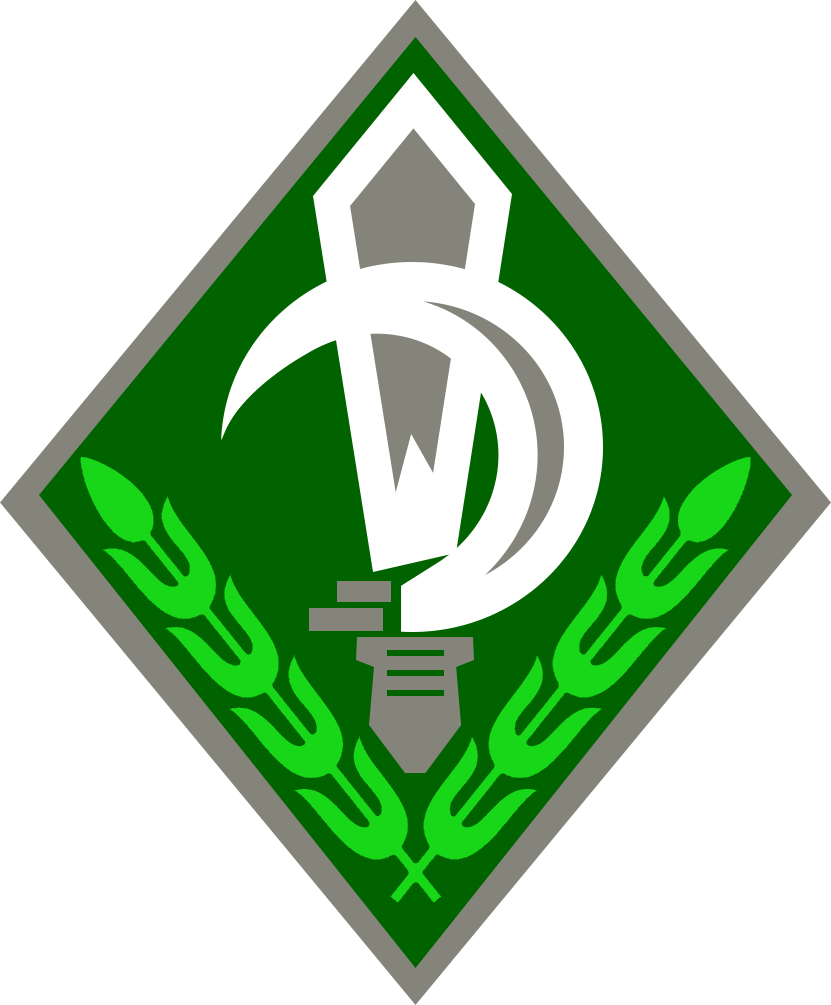
Nahal Symbol

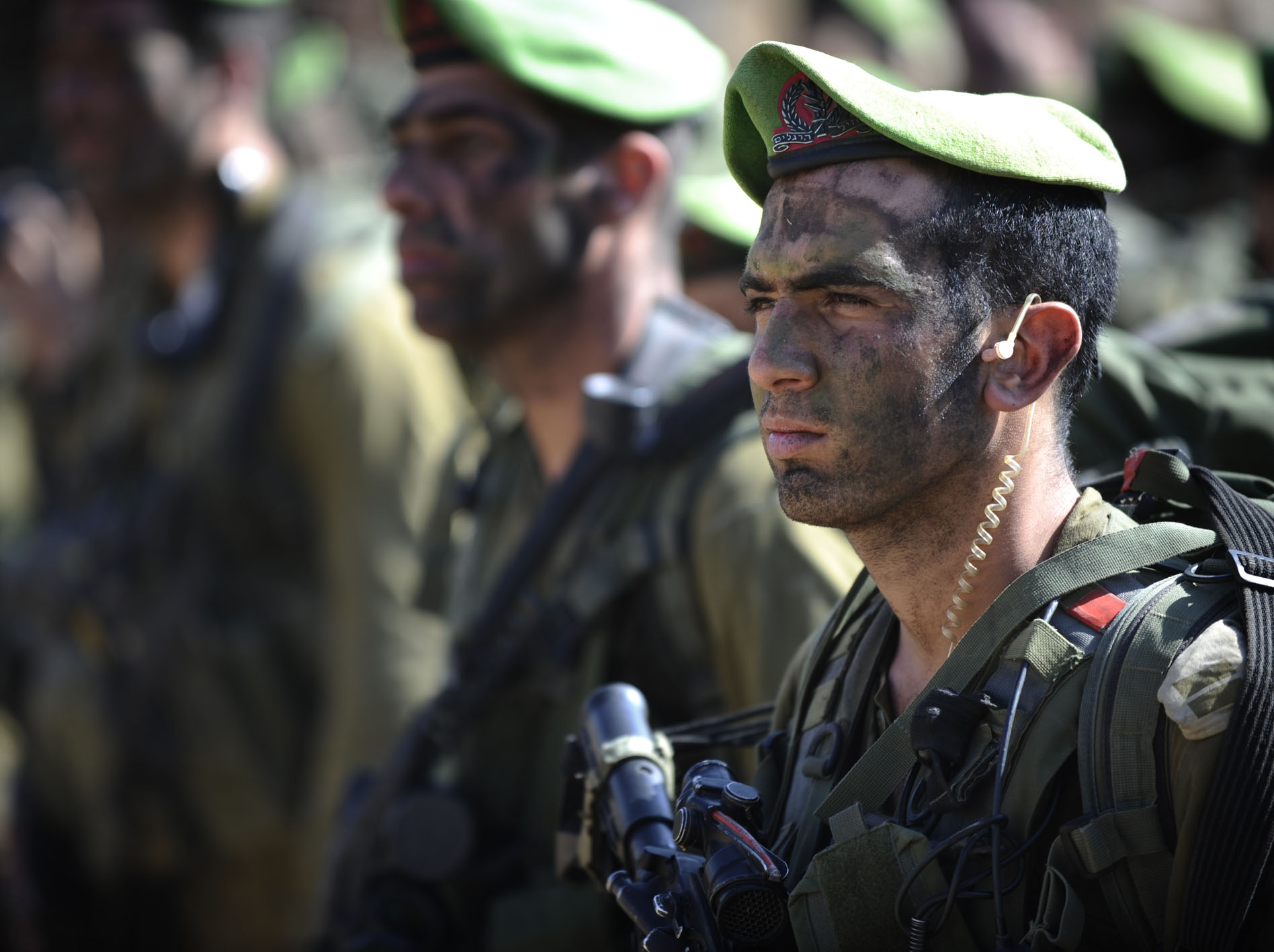
Nahal soldiers

Nahal (Hebrew: נח"ל) (acronym of Noar Halutzi Lohem, lit. Fighting Pioneer Youth) is an Israeli program that combines military service with mostly social welfare and informal education projects such as youth movement activities, as well as training in entrepreneurship in urban development areas. Prior to the 1990s it was a paramilitary Israel Defense Forces program that combined military service and the establishment of agricultural settlements, often in peripheral areas.

The Nahal groups of soldiers formed the core of the Nahal Infantry Brigade.

== History ==
In 1948, a gar'in (core group) of Jewish pioneers wrote to Israel's first and then-current Prime Minister David Ben-Gurion, requesting that members be allowed to do their military service as a group rather than being split up into different units at random. In response to this letter, Ben-Gurion created the Nahal program, which combined military service and farming.

Some 108 kibbutzim and agricultural settlements were established by the Nahal, many of them on Israel's borders.

Members of Nahal units, known as garinei Nahal (Nahal seeds) have served together in various army units, most famously in the Nahal Mutznakh (Airborne Nahal) battalion of the Paratroopers Brigade, the reserve battalion of which was instrumental in the Israeli victory in the Battle of Jerusalem during the 1967 Six-Day War. Many settlements founded by Nahal units in Galilee, the Negev, and the West Bank are still thriving today, including settlements formerly located in the Sinai Peninsula and Gaza Strip. Today, a gar'in is usually a group formed by a youth movement, such as the Israeli Scouts, for the purpose of volunteer work.

== Nahal and Youth Command ==
Today, there are two distinct units carrying on the historical tradition and name of the Nahal. The first is a large, non-combat command belonging to the IDF Education Corps, whose primary responsibility is to organize and coordinate the volunteer-type programs and activities that made the original Nahal unit famous in the 1950s, 1960s, and 1970s. This command has a full staff of educational officers and soldiers, and also sponsors other endeavours such as Gadna, a week-long 'introduction' to the military for high-schoolers in which they become acquainted with the history, traditions, and routines of the military that they are about to join.

== Nahal group ==
The Nahal group (Hebrew: גרעין נחל) is a form of community service developed in Israel, which combines social volunteerism, agriculture and military service. The service is divided into several parts:

- The military period (פרק צבאי)
- The national mission period (פרק משימה)
- Routine security measures (only for the male members) (בט"ש)
- Unpaid military service period (Military service with no payment) (של"ת) (although this part does not exist anymore for most Nahal groups)

In addition, most of the Nahal group members have done a "year of service" (שנת שירות) prior to enlistment, enlisting afterwards with the same group with whom they did the year of service.

The order of the periods is permanent, but there are changes in the length of the periods, in accordance with the recruitment cycles. Also, it is possible to have the unpaid military service period either at the beginning or at the end of each course.

=== The military period ===
During the first military period, the members of the Nahal group serve in the Nahal infantry brigade together. The male members have a combat service as part of the 50th battalion, Caracal Battalion, or in different positions in the Education and Youth Corps, and the female members serve in the Caracal Battalion or in different positions in the Education and Youth Corps and the Nahal headquarters. As part of their service, the members of the same group are entitled to serve in the same military unit (the 50th battalion, in the Caracal Battalion and in basic training of the female soldiers and the non-combat soldiers), and to hold a group meeting once in a while. At the end of their military service, after the release of the female Nahal soldiers, the remaining Nahal members return for half a year of routine security measures activities.

=== The national mission period ===
The national mission period lasts a year, in which all the core group stays together, under the command of the Education and Youth Corps. During the establishment of the state, the national mission was mostly the establishment of new settlements in periphery areas to serve as a security presence able to respond to terrorist incursions such as in the Jordan Valley (by means of Nahal settlements) and expansion of the existing kibbutzim. Over the years, and in accordance with the changes in the Israeli society, the national mission has changed to helping the poor populations throughout the country and nowadays the Nahal groups perform in the National mission period social and educational-based missions in the social periphery of the state of Israel. The soldiers live in apartments in different local authorities, and work in different education tasks in the schools, in the community centers, in the youth clubs, in the absorption centers, etc. The group is accompanied by Military commanders, the Youth organizers in the local authorities and representatives of the youth movement to which the group belongs to core.

The unpaid military-service periods are a remainder of the Nahal course which included living in kibbutzim, but today are more similar to the national mission periods, yet are shorter and are less monitored by the army.

In general, the military service of male members of the Nahal group is four months longer than the military service of most soldiers. However, some of the Nahal groups continue to work together, anyway, even after the military service, as part of adult movements or choose to continue living together, regardless of their original movement.

=== The Orthodox Nahal ===
Under the Nahal framework, there is now also a route in which soldiers who originate from the Jewish ultra-Orthodox sector could join. They serve for two years in the 97th battalion of the Kfir Brigade, and in addition they go to a one-year school in order to complete their studies and get a matriculation certificate or in order to get a profession.

== Lehakat HaNahal (The Nahal Band) ==
Lehakat HaNahal (The Nahal Band or the Nahal Entertainment Troupe) is a military music troupe known for its Eretz Israel songs. Founded in 1950, it has become an integral part in Israeli military culture. Many Israeli singers and entertainers began their careers in Lehakat HaNahal, among them Tuvia Tzafir, Neomy Polani and Gidi Gov. Other notable members include Arik Einstein, Danny Sanderson, Shalom Hanoch and Yossi Banai.

== Nahal infantry brigade ==
The Nahal Brigade was formed around core groups of Airborne Nahal soldiers in 1982 due to the growing need for infantry manpower in the wake of the 1982 Lebanon War. As a result, it maintains parts of the Nahal insignia and Nahal groups continue to serve there.

=== Weapons and gear ===
The Nahal brigade uses the IMI Tavor TAR-21 rifle.

== Awards and recognition ==
In 1984, Nahal was awarded the Israel Prize for its special contribution to society and the State of Israel.

== Nahal Africa ==
In the 1960s there was an Israeli aid project for developing countries, in Africa, Asia and South America, with the help of the Nahal Corps. The reasons for the establishment of this project were, among other things, an attempt to create areas of influence in the bordering countries that have political ties with countries that were in direct conflict with Israel. This project helped create the international image of the State of Israel, and opened the door to economic and security cooperation.

Guinea was the first location for this project. John Tatega, the secretary general of the trade unions in Guinea, showed interest in the Israeli army and its methods for making the desert flourish, and following negotiations, a delegation of four Israeli Nahal officers was sent to Guinea who helped to establish similar units in the Ghanaian army organized in a divisional framework called the "Builders Brigade". This division helped create an employment framework for thousands of Guineans, promoted the undeveloped agriculture for the country, and united members of different tribes with a history of hostility in one framework. John Tatega was at the head of the framework and on the recommendation of the Israelis he received a rank equivalent to lieutenant colonel.

Dozens of Israeli Nahal delegations participated in the project that began in Guinea and continued in Kenya, Tanzania, Zambia, Malawi, the Ivory Coast, the Central African Republic, Chad, Cameroon, Togo; and outside Africa: Iran, Singapore, Ecuador, Bolivia and more. In addition, representative delegations from those countries came to Israel to learn from the predictions. The Nahal assisted in the creation of paramilitary or military frameworks, and in the development of agricultural and forestry methods.

The Nahal's activities abroad and on the international level largely ceased due to the deterioration of Israel's political relations after the Six Day War, however many of the frameworks that were established continued to function, and certain collaborations on different levels even continued.For example, Kenya, where the Nahal operated, and which was the beginning of the political relationship with it, which finally led to some cooperation during "Operation Jonathan" to free Entebbe hostages.

== List of battalions under Nahal command ==
- Battalion 902 – Settlement battalion in the Kinneret area.
- Battalion 903 – Settlement battalion in the Jordan Valley and Arava.
- Battalion 904 – Settlement battalion in the Gaza Strip, Rafah, El Arish.
- Battalion 905 – Settlement battalion in the Arava and southern Sinai.
- Battalion 906 – Nahal Negev, Shibta Camp. Today, it is the NCO School at Bislach.
- Battalion 907 – Settlement battalion. Fought within the Negev Brigade during the Six-Day War.
- Battalion 908 – Basic Training Battalion (Camp 80), since 1993 Basic Training Battalion 908 (Tel Arad) which initially operated under Nahal Command.
- Battalion 931 – Security battalion in the Ramim Ridge sector under Northern Command (established in 1976). Today in the Nahal Brigade.
- Battalion 932 – Security battalion under Central Command (established in 1976). Today in the Nahal Brigade.
- Battalion 937 – Settlement battalion in the 1990s.
- Battalion 950 – Security battalion until 1987. Later merged with Battalion 50 of the Paratrooper Nahal and joined the Nahal Brigade.

== See also ==
- Nahal settlement
- List of Israel Prize recipients
