= 3 Maccabees =

Ancient Greek text

- Genesis: Bereshit
- Exodus: Shemot
- Leviticus: Wayiqra
- Numbers: Bemidbar
- Deuteronomy: Devarim

3 Maccabees, (Note: Greek: Μακκαβαίων Γ´, romanized: Makkabaíōn 3) also called the Third Book of Maccabees, is a book written in Koine Greek, likely in the 1st century BC in either the late Ptolemaic period of Egypt or in early Roman Egypt. Despite the title, the book has nothing to do with the Maccabean Revolt against the Seleucid Empire described in 1 Maccabees and 2 Maccabees. Instead it tells the story of a persecution of the Jews under Pharaoh Ptolemy IV Philopator (222–205 BC) in Ptolemaic Egypt, some decades before the Maccabee uprising in Judea. The story purports to explain the origin of a Purim-like festival celebrated in Egypt. 3 Maccabees is somewhat similar to the Book of Esther, another book which describes how a king is advised to annihilate the Diaspora Jews in his territory, yet is thwarted by God.

In 3 Maccabees, King Ptolemy IV Philopator attempts to enter the Second Temple in Jerusalem, but is rebuffed by divine power. He grows to hate Jews, and orders the Jews of Egypt assembled in his hippodrome to be executed by elephants. However, God protects the Jews, and Ptolemy's elephants trample his own men instead. Ptolemy experiences a change of heart and lets the Jews go free; the Jews establish a festival in celebration.

3 Maccabees is considered part of the Biblical Anagignoskomena (deuterocanon) in the Eastern Orthodox Church, the Assyrian Church of the East, and some Oriental Orthodox Churches: the Armenian Apostolic Church and the Syriac Orthodox Church. Jews, Catholics, and Protestants do not regard it as canonical, though some (the Moravian Brethren as an example) include it in the apocrypha section of their bibles. The split dates back to the Apostolic Canons approved by the Eastern Church's Council in Trullo in 692 AD but rejected by the Western Church's Pope Sergius I. Trullo established that the first three books of Maccabees were canonical in the Chalcedonian Eastern Church.

== Contents ==
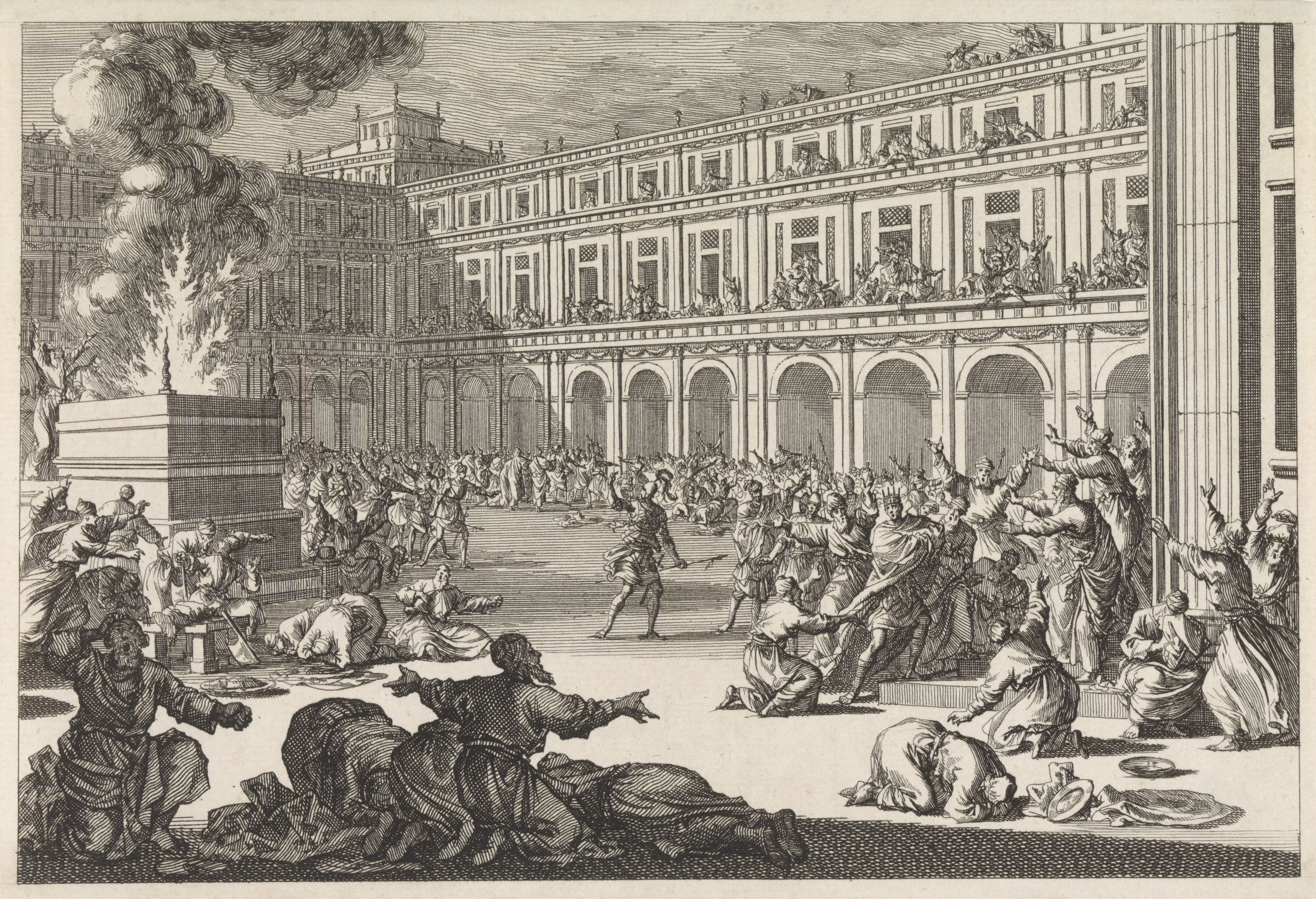
Ptolemy IV Philopator is struck by paralysis after coming too close to the sanctuary; Dutch engraving c. 1700

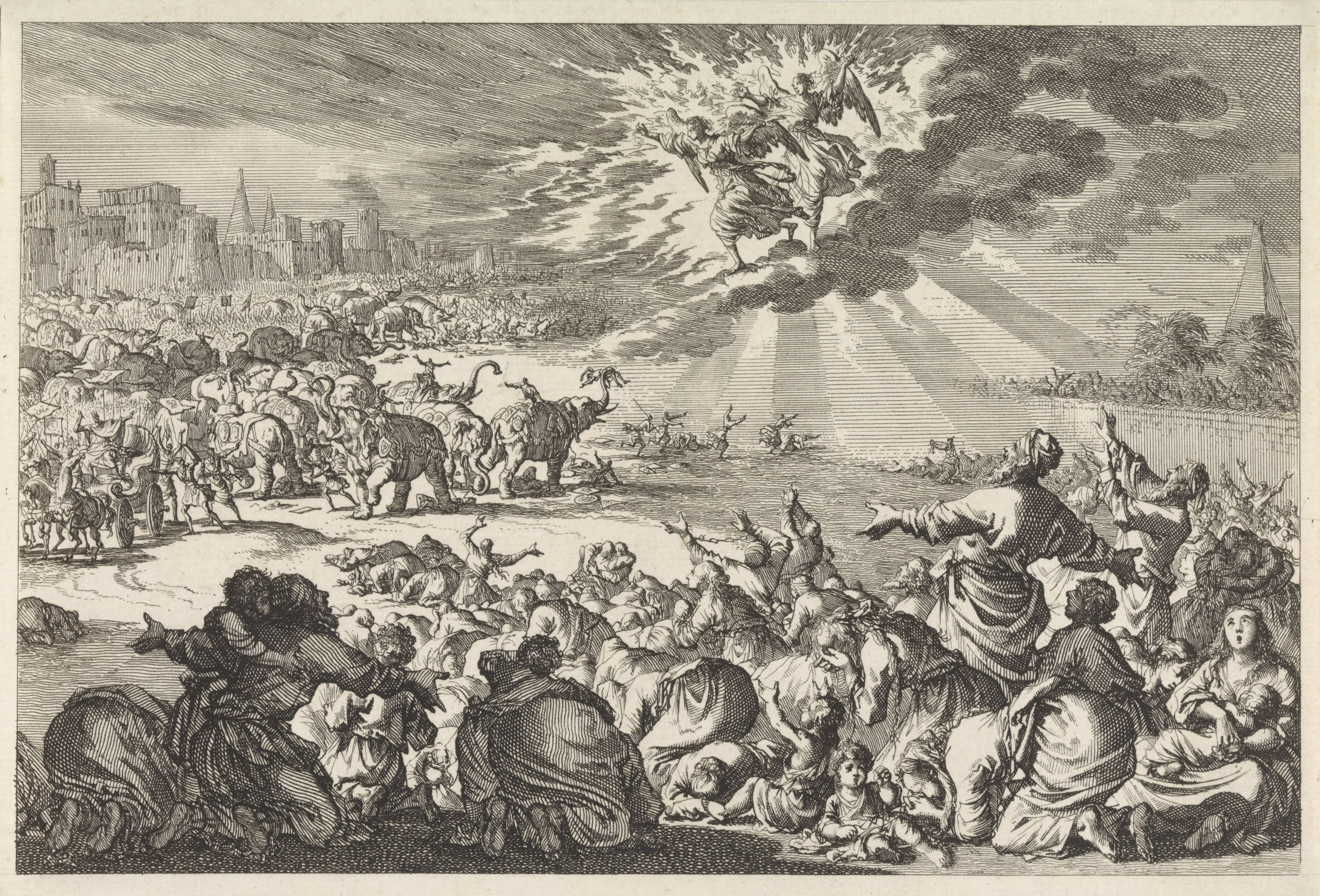
Ptolemy IV Philopator tries to have the Jews killed by drunken elephants; the Jews pray and are saved by two angels (3 Macc 5); Dutch engraving c. 1700

According to the book, after Ptolemy IV Philopator's victory against Antiochus III in 217 BC at the Battle of Raphia, he visited Jerusalem and the Second Temple, wishing to see the inner sanctuary. However, he is miraculously prevented from entering the building. This leads him to hate the Jews. Upon his return to the capital of Alexandria, he orders that all the Jews in the kingdom are to be registered, be made to pay a poll tax, and be reduced to the status of slaves. Those Jews who agree to abandon their faith and be initiated into the cult of Dionysus are to be spared. After most Jews persist in their faith, the king orders them rounded up and put to death in his hippodrome.

The attempt to register all the Jews before their execution is thwarted by the sheer number of the Jews. Ptolemy then attempts to have the Jews killed by crushing by elephant and orders 500 elephants to be intoxicated in order to enrage them. However, the execution is repeatedly thwarted. God first causes Ptolemy to oversleep, then causes him to miraculously forget his anger against the Jews. Ptolemy finally attempts to lead the elephants and his own army into the hippodrome to destroy the Jews personally, but after an impassioned prayer by Eleazar, God sends two angels who prevent this.

Ptolemy abruptly forgets his anger with the Jews and honors them with various immunities and a banquet, with several dates being established as commemorative festivals. The Jews request and receive permission to return home and to kill all the Jews who chose to abandon their faith in order to be spared. The book includes a letter, ostensibly by Ptolemy, to this effect. Finally, the Jews return home.

== Authorship and date ==
The author of this book was likely an Alexandrian Jew who wrote in Greek as part of Hellenistic Judaism. The author is prone to rhetorical constructs and has a bombastic style. His Greek is excellent and native, including rare and poetic words; he also seems familiar with Hebrew literature, if possibly in translation. The themes and style of the book are similar to those of 2 Maccabees, the Letter of Aristeas, and the Book of Esther, suggesting the author had read them. (Note: In the case of the Greek version of Esther, it is proposed alternatively that its translator had read 3 Maccabees; the primacy of which book came first is disputed.) Similar to 2 Maccabees, the author was likely influenced by the "pathetic" (in the sense of pathos) style of Greek argumentation that sought to appeal to emotion and sentiment, with stories such as brides and grooms being dragged away from their homes. The author seems interested and fluent in Ptolemaic court politics and protocol.

The precise date of authorship is unknown, but the widest plausible range keeping with the text is considered to be between 100 BC and 70 AD. (Note: Bounded by 100 BC due to a reference to the Greek additions to Daniel, specifically the Prayer of Azariah, which did not exist until around 100 BC (3 Maccabees 6:6 and Daniel 3:49–50); bounded by 70 AD because the writer clearly assumes the Temple is still protected by God, and the Temple was destroyed in 70 AD.) Scholars generally advocate for one of three periods of Egyptian history: the late Ptolemaic period (100–30 BC), the early Roman period (30–20 BC), and the later Roman period (c. 40 AD).

Advocates for the early Roman period include Moses Hadas, Victor Tcherikover, and Matan Orian. They argue that the work was written perhaps around 25–15 BC. This is because the story attacks the idea of a census (laographia, a rare word before the Romans came) and its related poll tax, saying it would reduce the Jews to the status of slaves, and the Romans conducted such a census in Roman Egypt in 24 BC. Additionally, publishing a story where a Ptolemaic king acted rashly and was thwarted while the Ptolemies still ruled would be very bold, suggesting a publication date after the Roman absorption of Egypt in 30 BC. The work could then function as an esoteric criticism of Roman policies without naming them directly.

Advocates for the later Roman period include Heinrich Ewald, Hugo Willrich, and John J. Collins. They hold that the book was written as a polemic against Emperor Caligula, thus dating from around 40 AD. The work includes an incident at the Second Temple and an attack on Egyptian Jews; something similar happened in this period albeit with the order reversed, with anti-Jewish riots in Alexandria in 38 AD and Caligula attempting to install a statue of himself in the Temple around 39–40 AD. Arguments against this theory are that Caligula's actions do not match Ptolemy in the book that closely; for example, Ptolemy does not claim he is a divinity and attempt to self-deify himself as Caligula did. The riots in Alexandria came from common people rather than government ministers, as in 3 Maccabees. The author does not appear to have knowledge of Roman activities of the later 1st century that caused opposition from Jews such as desecration of sanctuaries.

Scholars who favor the late Ptolemaic period include Elias Bickerman, Hugh Anderson, and Sara Raup Johnson. On the topic of the census, they propose that it is entirely possible that a Ptolemaic census had also threatened to reduce the status of Jews to that of native Egyptians (the least prestigious caste in Ptolemaic society) by making Alexandrian Jews pay a tax usually only levied on rural populations. Even if laographia is truly felt to be a reference to the Roman census, that is only an argument for a slight post-publication modification of a few passages, in this view. The rest of the work fits snugly into traditions of works of Hellenistic Judaism which inspired the author such as 2 Maccabees, which date to around 100 BC, so 3 Maccabees should fit into that same cultural milieu and era as well. More generally, while the threatened extermination of Jews may seem extreme and thus fit better in the Roman period of declining Jew–Gentile relations, the work is still ultimately an endorsement of the status quo of the Hellenistic era. The tone is largely positive, with glad thanksgivings for God's deliverance rather than thundering apocalyptic proclamations. Even as the royal court persecutes them, the author writes that "The Jews continued to maintain goodwill and unswerving loyalty towards the [Ptolemaic] dynasty." The Jews are eventually given legal immunities by the king and return to contented loyalty to the Greek government, a sentiment considered by supporters of a Ptolemaic-era origin to be a poor fit for the Roman era of distant governors unsympathetic to the Jews.

== Manuscripts and title ==
3 Maccabees was preserved due to inclusion in the Septuagint, the Greek Jewish Scriptures. While Hellenistic Judaism waned with time and the work was not included in the Masoretic canon of the Tanakh (Hebrew scriptures) used by later Jews, early Christians preserved the Septuagint as the basis for the Christian Old Testament, ensuring that the work was not lost. The lists of books in early manuscripts of the Septuagint were not yet standardized, however. The Codex Vaticanus lacks the books of Maccabees and the Codex Sinaiticus includes only 1 and 4 Maccabees; only the Codex Alexandrinus includes all of 1, 2, 3, and 4 Maccabees. The 8th–9th century Venetus, while written much later than Alexandrinus, largely agrees with it, so there are few textual variations.

Lucian of Antioch made a number of changes to his version of the Septuagint, resulting in variant readings. Lucianic versions became the standard in Syria, Asia Minor, and Constantinople, with the version of 3 Maccabees in the Syriac Peshitta notably Lucianic in character, as well as being a rather free translation that included several expansions. There also exists also a paraphrastic Armenian version that dates to 400–600 AD. Robert Hanhart published a critical edition of the Greek text in 1960, with a second edition in 1980.

The original title of the book, if any, is unknown. The Septuagint is what gave the work the title "3 Maccabees", despite being something of a misnomer. Presumably, this was due to the apparent links to 2 Maccabees and to distinguish it from the other books of Maccabees in the Septuagint. Similarities with stories in 2 Maccabees include the High Priest Simon II appearing, the father of Onias III who is discussed in 2 Maccabees, and fends off an attempt by Philopator to enter the Temple of Jerusalem; the suffering of Egyptian Jews is described in a similar manner to the martyrdom of Eleazar and the woman with seven sons; Eleazar himself reappears in this story; and two angels appear in the finale of the story to stop a king's anti-Jewish actions, similar to the story of Heliodorus. The book may also have been referred to by Pseudo-Athanasius as "Ptolemaica" (Ptolemaics).

== Historicity ==
The contents of the book have a legendary character and it is not generally considered reliable as history; it is closer to a romance or historical novel, similar to the Book of Judith or Greek romances. Some parts of the story, such as the names of the Jews taking up all the paper in Egypt or the king granting the Jews a license to murder apostates, are clearly fictional. Additionally, the Book of Daniel, generally agreed to have been written around 165 BC, does not mention any such attack by the Ptolemies (referred to there as the "king of the south") against the Temple in its chapter 11 recounting of history as known to the author; as Daniel comprehensively chronicles threats against the Temple, this suggests the story of Ptolemy IV attempting to raid the Temple was invented for literary purposes. No other ancient sources or histories describe such an alleged persecution under Philopater. German historian Emil Schürer called the book almost entirely fictitious and a work of the poorest sort.

That said, while many elements of the story are dubious, many scholars accept that memories of a genuine persecution might be being described in 3 Maccabees, if distorted. Josephus writes that many (but certainly not all) Jews were put to death in Alexandria under the reign of Ptolemy VIII Physcon (146–117 BC) due to their support for his rival Cleopatra II, and this execution was indeed carried out by intoxicated elephants. This may be the historical center of the account in 3 Maccabees; the author transferred it to an earlier time period and added an ahistorical connection to Jerusalem if this theory is correct. Even Josephus's account may be heavily embellished, however: no independent evidence exists for such a persecution either, so he may have simply been building from the same legend as 3 Maccabees. Hugo Willrich claimed that the root of the story was a persecution by Ptolemy X Alexander I in 88 BCE, but based the claim on a questionable reading of Jordanes writing centuries later; this theory has not found acceptance among others. Moses Hadas suggests that the book could be describing and opposing a loss of civil rights in the Roman era, and the book was closer to describing troubles the Egyptian Jewish community had after the loss of the reasonably amenable late Ptolemaic rulers and the transition to Roman rule. As described in the speculation on the date of authorship, it is possible that the book was actually describing a contemporary Roman persecution, but moved the setting earlier in time. Another possibility is that the persecution which inspired the work was the best-attested one: that of Antiochus IV in Judea chronicled in 2 Maccabees, and the Egyptian author was telling a "what if it happened here?" story.

The book's opening, a retelling of the Battle of Raphia, is generally agreed to be loosely accurate, if not to the quality of Polybius's version. It may have been based on a lost history of Ptolemy of Megalopolis, Philopater's governor of Cyprus, and seems to have been based on an account written from the Ptolemaic point of view. The account of Ptolemy's visit to the Temple is considered based on the story of Heliodorus in 2 Maccabees rather than any historical event; archaeological evidence has been found suggesting Philopater indeed visited towns in Coele-Syria in the era to offer sacrifices to the local temples, but no other evidence of a controversy related to such visits exists, or if the visits even extended to Jerusalem.

A possible interpretation that gives credit to the historicity of 3 Maccabees might go something like this: Ptolemy Philopater was more open-minded than many Greeks in that he attempted to integrate non-Greeks into his army and administration, notably native Egyptians. Doing so required creation of a syncretic religion to unify everyone, Greek and non-Greek alike. As a devotee of Dionysus, perhaps he attempted to ensure the loyalty of recruited non-Greeks by initiating them into the Dionysian Mysteries in exchange for citizenship (3:21). Some Jews obeyed but most refused the offer (2:31–33, 3:22–23). The king was angry and threatened Jews who were already citizens with loss of their status if they did not join, a potential catastrophe that would be remembered for centuries. The Jews tried bribery (2:32). While nothing like the attempted mass execution at the hippodrome thwarted by angels occurred, some Jews in the provinces were possibly executed (3:12–30), before eventually the initiative stopped. Still, this is speculative. Notably, other Greek writings indicate that the cult of Dionysus, as a mystery cult, restricted entry rather than opening it widely to all; it was a status symbol that people had to petition to be initiated in. If Ptolemy Philopater really had thrown open the cult to everyone, it would have been an unusual move.

Another theory about the historical basis of the book was advanced by Adolf Büchler in 1899. He held that the book describes the persecution of the Jews in the Fayum region of Egypt, rather than in Alexandria. The Jews in Coele-Syria abruptly changed allegiance from the Ptolemies to the Seleucids in 200 BC as a consequence of Seleucid victory in the Fifth Syrian War. Büchler argues that this put Egyptian Jews under suspicion now that the Temple in Jerusalem was led by a High Priest who answered to the rival Seleucids, triggering a persecution in Egypt.

== Theology ==
Despite clearly being familiar with 2 Maccabees, the author does not appear to agree with some of its tenets. While describing suffering and evil, the book makes no reference to a future resurrection of the innocent nor future retribution for villains. While two angels appear in response to a prayer, the author specifically writes that the angels were invisible to the Jews, perhaps suggesting a reluctance to ascribe power or authority to angels rather than God, or a reconciling of conflicting stories. The author may have been theologically conservative, keeping to classic traditions of Judaism in opposition to the influence of Greek thought on Judaism, such as Greek beliefs on the immortality of the soul that 2 Maccabees includes.

One of the main goals of the book may have been to explain the reason behind the Purim-esque festival celebrated by Egyptian Jews. In this theory, the origins of the festival had been muddied by time, and the author expanded existing stories of persecution into a story of how God saved the Jews of Egypt.

The author shows a high regard for the power of prayer; the work frequently depicts the Jews praying for aid, and God answering their prayers. Simon, the Jews collectively, and Eleazar all pray to God in situations of dire need, and these prayers are answered directly.

The author's concluding story sharply condemns apostasy in Judaism: 300 Jews who had left the faith during the initial registration are slain by pious Jews. The story may be partially based on Esther 9, where 300 people are also killed, but there the enemies are gentiles which had sought to destroy the Jews; here, they are merely Jewish civilians, and after the crisis has already passed.

== Influence ==
3 Maccabees was not influential. No Jewish writers of the ancient era appear to reference it or be familiar with it, even those who wrote in Greek. The book was not translated into the Latin Vulgate, hence the Western Church's rejection of including it even as a member of the deuterocanonical books. While the book was kept in the Greek-speaking Eastern Church's scripture, it is only very rarely referenced or alluded to. Theodoret briefly summarizes 3 Maccabees in one of his writings, but this is the rare exception; the work had little influence on Christianity. 3 Maccabees is included in the deuterocanon of the Eastern Orthodox Church and some Oriental Orthodox Churches: the Armenian Apostolic Church, the Syriac Orthodox Church; as well as the Assyrian Church of the East. The Apostolic Canons approved by the Eastern Church's Council in Trullo in 692 verified 1, 2, and 3 Maccabees were deuterocanonical, but the Council was rejected by the Western Church's Pope Sergius I.

== Bibliography ==
- Hadas, Moses (1953). The Third and Fourth Books of Maccabees. New York: Harper & Brothers. LCCN 53-5114.
- Johnson, Sara Raup (2004). Historical Fictions and Hellenistic Jewish Identity: Third Maccabees in Its Cultural Context. University of California Press. ISBN 9780520233072. JSTOR 10.1525/j.ctt1ppghn.

3 Maccabees E. Orthodox; Deuterocanon / Apocrypha
Preceded by 2 Maccabees	E. Orthodox; Books of the Bible	Succeeded by 4 Maccabees
