= 6 Maccabees =

6 Maccabees, or the Sixth Book of Maccabees, is an anonymous Classical Syriac narrative poem about the martyrdom of Eleazar and the woman with seven sons under Antiochus IV as described in the prose Greek works 2 Maccabees and 4 Maccabees. 6 Maccabees is a conventional title based on the theory that it is an Old Testament pseudepigraphal work of Jewish origin.

6 Maccabees was originally written in Syriac and only a Syriac text is known, preserved in at least three manuscripts. The whereabouts of only one of these is currently known: Bodleian, Or. 624 (Syr. 134), an 18th- or 19th-century copy in Nestorian script from the Christian community of Malabar in India. The manuscript tradition and the final form of the text are certainly Christian. The work itself may be of a very late date. Sebastian Brock proposed the 12th or 13th century. Sigrid Peterson, on the other hand, argues that the earliest, unembellished form of the text must be earlier than 4 Maccabees (1st–2nd century). The text as we have it, however, makes reference to 4 Maccabees when it says that Josephus wrote the martyrs' history, since 4 Maccabees was commonly if erroneously attributed to Josephus.

6 Maccabees contains 678 lines of verse. Its use of rhyme is indicative of a medieval, as opposed to ancient, origin. Its dodecasyllabic metre is strongly associated with Jacob of Serugh (died 521). The genre of the piece, mēmrē, is that of a homily in narrative verse, with characteristics of a dramatic dialogue and perhaps even of Jewish piyyutim. Much of it consists of the speeches given by the woman, Martha Shamoni (Marty Shmuni), before the execution of each of her sons. The names of the sons in 6 Maccabees are Gadday, Maqqbay, Tarsay, Hebron, Hebson, Bakkos and Yonadab, which are the names known in both the East and West Syriac traditions.

The content of 6 Maccabees is a mix of Jewish and Christian. There is an emphasis on keeping the Jewish law, but also references to Jesus, Paul and Stephen, to the intercession of saints and to the construction of churches commemorating the Maccabean martyrs. Although forceful arguments have been made for a Jewish original in Syriac, there is no clear evidence of the use of that literary language among Jews.

The Syriac text with an English translation was published by Robert Lubbock Bensly in 1895. A revised translation can be found in Peterson's dissertation.
