= 4 Maccabees =

Book written in Koine Greek

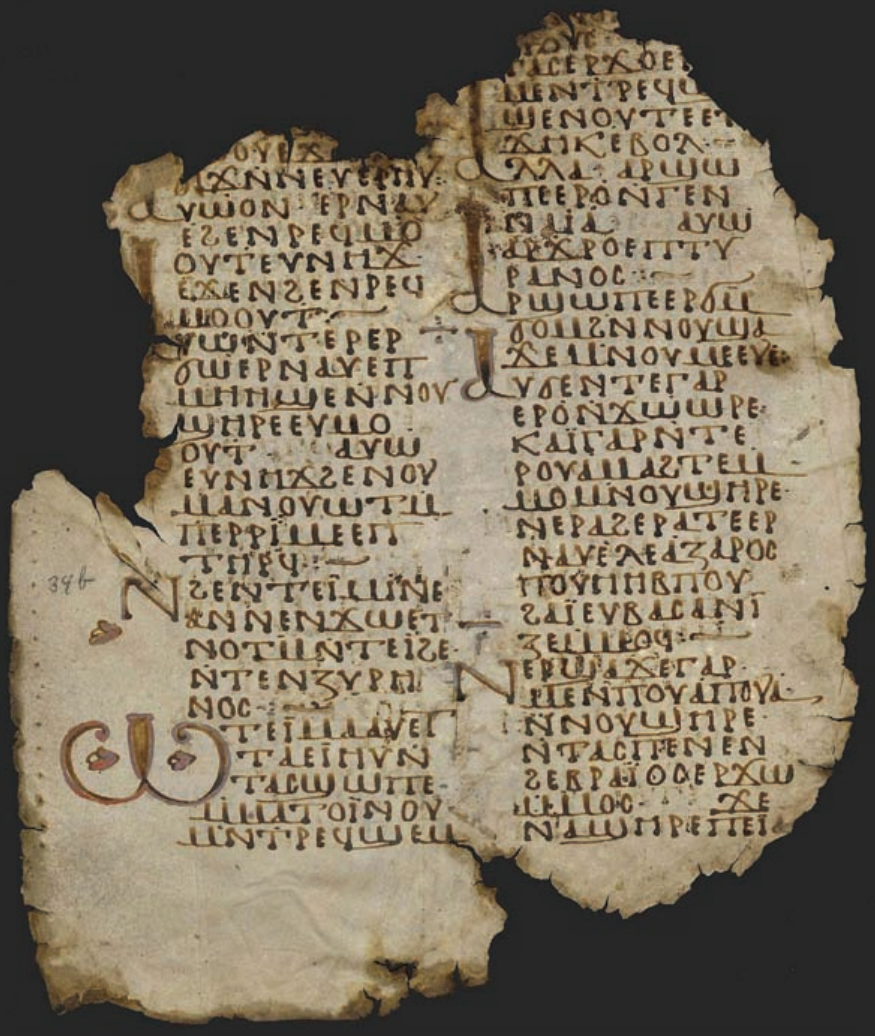
Fragment of a Coptic version of 4 Maccabees

4 Maccabees, (Note: Greek: Μακκαβαίων Δʹ, romanized: Makkabaíōn 4) also called the Fourth Book of Maccabees and possibly originally known as On the Sovereignty of Reason, (Note: Greek: περὶ αὐτοκράτορος λογισμοῦ, romanized: perì autokrátoros logismoû) is a book written in Koine Greek, likely in the 1st or early 2nd century. It is a homily or philosophic discourse praising the supremacy of pious reason over passion. It is a work that combines Hellenistic Judaism with influence from Greek philosophy, particularly the school of Stoicism.

The work is largely an elaboration of the stories of martyrdom in the book 2 Maccabees: that of the woman with seven sons and the scribe Eleazar, who are tortured to death by Seleucid King Antiochus IV Epiphanes in an attempt to make them renounce their adherence to Judaism. What 2 Maccabees covered in one chapter and a half, 4 Maccabees extends to a full 14 chapters of dialogue and philosophical discussion. 4 Maccabees recasts the story as one of reason and logic: the martyrs will be rewarded in the afterlife, so it is rational to continue to obey Jewish law, even at the risk of torture and death.

== Synopsis ==
I could prove to you from many and various examples that reason is dominant over the emotions, but I can demonstrate it best from the noble bravery of those who died for the sake of virtue, Eleazar and the seven brothers and their mother. All of these, by despising sufferings that bring death, demonstrated that reason controls the emotions.

— 4 Maccabees 1:7–9 (NRSV)

The work consists of a prologue and two main sections. The first advances the philosophical thesis on the basis of examples from the Law of Moses and the biblical tradition while the second illustrates the points made using examples drawn from 2 Maccabees: the martyrdom of Eleazar and the woman with seven sons under King Antiochus IV Epiphanes of the Seleucid Empire. The last chapters concern the author's impressions drawn from these martyrdoms. It has been suggested that, while 2 Maccabees was written with appeals to emotion, sentiment, and drama (pathos), 4 Maccabees is considerably more intellectual about the matter. The martyred woman calmly debates her captors, explaining why her actions are rational given God's promise of rewards in the afterlife, using arguments akin to those favored by Stoic philosophy. The author of 4 Maccabees still appreciates the power of arousing emotions, however. The work goes into more grisly detail concerning the martyrdoms themselves than 2 Maccabees; "even now, we ourselves shudder as we hear of the suffering of these young men" (4 Maccabees 14:9). The author has the clear rhetorical intent of arousing admiration and emulation of these examples of devotion to the Jewish law.

The work is in fluent and complicated Greek using the rhetorical argumentative style of the time. Harry Orlinsky describes it as "an elaborate variation, in philosophical and highly dramatic vein, of the theme" of 2 Maccabees 6:18–7:4. The work uses secular allusions to Greek-style athletics and military contests, calling Eleazar a "noble athlete" and the martyred mother of the seven sons a "soldier of God".

The work defends the merits of Judaism in a Hellenized world. According to it, devout practice of Judaism perfects the values held dear in Greek and Roman contexts, with the martyrs presented in terms reminiscent of Greek sages.

== Authorship, date, and title ==
The author of the work is unknown. The book is ascribed to the Jewish historian Josephus by Eusebius and Jerome, and this opinion was accepted for many years, leading to its inclusion in many editions of Josephus' works. Later scholars have rejected this claim of authorship, however. There are differences of language and style; 4 Maccabees makes several historical errors that Josephus's work does not make; and the ideology of the two seems to conflict (Josephus favored accommodation toward Gentile practices, not the uncompromising stance seen in 4 Maccabees). The author was probably not from Roman Judea, as the book includes a minor geographical mistake about the layout of Jerusalem, Judea was largely Aramaic-speaking in the era, and the tone of the work suggests the defense of a cultural minority in a Hellenistic environment. As such, he was probably a diaspora Jew, although from where is unclear. Alexandria was the largest site of literary Greek Jewish works in the era, but scholars such as Hans Freudenthal and Eduard Norden think that the religious outlook of the book does not easily match Alexandrian Jewish thought. Moses Hadas suggests that Antioch in Roman Syria was a more likely site for composition: a thoroughly Hellenized and Greek-speaking city with a large Jewish minority that revered the martyrs, judging by later Christian churches dedicated to the "Maccabean martyrs" in Antioch, as well as certain word usage that was rare among Alexandrian works such as 3 Maccabees.

The original title of the work, if any, is uncertain. The Septuagint is what gave it its modern name of "4 Maccabees" to distinguish it from the other books of Maccabees in it, but it almost certainly was not the original title of the work. Eusebius and Jerome wrote that the work of Josephus on the martyrdoms of the Maccabees – presumably 4 Maccabees – was called "On the Sovereignty of Reason", suggesting that might have been the original title. This title would be consistent with the conventions of Greek philosophical and ethical works of the period (e.g., Seneca's "On Anger", "On Benefits", "On the Constancy of the Wise Person").

The book is generally dated between 20 and 130 CE. Elias J. Bickerman suggests a composition date somewhere between 20–54 CE; Moses Hadas agrees with that range and further suggests that perhaps around 40 CE during the reign of Roman Emperor Caligula would fit. Other scholars such as André Dupont-Sommer support a later date, perhaps during the reign of Emperor Hadrian (118–135 CE).

The last chapter differs from the earlier chapters in style, and is a somewhat disorganized summary of what has been stated before. According to some scholars, this might be evidence that the last chapter is a later addition to the work, though this is disputed. The argument in favor of it being an original part of the composition is that the book would have a weak ending without the final chapter, and that the style and vocabulary of the final chapter is not as different as claimed. The change of direction with chapter 17 supports the view of the work as a homily held before a Greek-speaking audience on the feast of Hanukkah, as advanced by Ewald and Freudenthal, where this would be a rhetorical element to draw the listeners into the discourse. Others hold that a homily would have to be based on scriptural texts, which this work is only loosely.

In terms of genre, the book resembles both the panegyric or encomium (speeches in honor of a particular person or subject) as well as the philosophical diatribe. The work has a clearly Stoic stamp as the thesis it seeks to demonstrate is that "pious reason exercises mastery over the emotions" (4 Maccabees 1:1). The adjective "pious," however, is critically important: the author is altering the common topic ("reason can master the emotions") in order to suggest that it is the mind that has been trained in the piety and exercises in the practices of the Jewish Law that is equipped to exercise the mastery that Greek ethicists praise. The work also resonates with sentiments articulated by other philosophical schools such as Platonism.

== Theology ==
The writer believes in the immortality of the soul, but never mentions the resurrection of the dead. Good souls are said to live forever in happiness with the patriarchs and God, but even the evil souls are held to be immortal. The suffering and martyrdom of the Maccabees is seen by the author to be vicarious for the Jewish nation, and the author portrays martyrdom in general as bringing atonement for the past sins of the Jews. In this it is similar to the Testament of Moses, which was written or updated around the same time period, and similarly praises the virtues of martyrdom and resistance.

While the setting of the book is during the Seleucid and Maccabee period of Judea, it is generally believed that the author intended to apply the lessons from this era in his current time. The book thus functions as an endorsement of fidelity to Jewish customs and law and against assimilation to Gentile practice where this conflicted with the Torah.

David A. deSilva considers the work's depiction of personal trust and faithfulness toward God as being in line with early Christian theology; notably, he argues that the Jewish Christian Epistle to the Hebrews has a similar viewpoint on the matter of the meaning of faith. The work also seems to have proto-Christian views on the nature of atonement: that the sacrifice of animals at the Temple (impossible in the Maccabean era, as well as for diaspora Jews in the author's era) could be replaced by a sacrifice of "obedience unto death" by faithful humans. While it is difficult to know for sure, deSilva also hypothesizes that the kind of promotion of the value of the Jewish Law for shaping an ethical life might have been used by the Jewish Christians who sought to persuade Gentile Christians also to adopt a Jewish way of life. These Jewish Christians, however, have not left a written legacy of their own; we have access to their arguments only as reflected in Paul's letters angrily denouncing their understanding of Christianity.

== Canonicity ==
4 Maccabees enjoyed little influence on later Judaism. Hellenistic Judaism waned with time, and the book was not translated to Hebrew in its era. It was not included in the Masoretic canon of Hebrew scriptures, the Tanakh, and thus was not considered canonical by later Jews. Stories of the martyrs did circulate among Jews in rabbinic literature, but likely from independent traditions rather than 4 Maccabees directly.

The work was preserved largely among Christians. These early Christians both were interested in stories of martyrdom and generally admired Stoicism. The book seems to have been reasonably esteemed in the early Christian church: sermons and works of John Chrysostom, Gregory of Nazianzus, and Ambrose evince familiarity with 4 Maccabees. The work also had a profound impact on Origen. The popular Martyrdom of Polycarp exhibits many similarities with the stories in 4 Maccabees. Despite circulating among early Christian communities who used versions of the Septuagint that included 4 Maccabees, church councils were generally more skeptical. In Greek lists, the book appears in the Apostolic Canons, but no others. In Latin lists, it appears in Codex Claromontanus. If the Gelasian Decree is taken as an accurate record of the "Damasine canon" compiled by Pope Damasus I (366–383 CE), then neither 3 Maccabees nor 4 Maccabees was in the Western, Latin church's list of canonical books of the 4th century. The book was not translated by Jerome into the Latin Vulgate. As a result, the work was generally obscure in Latin-reading Western Europe.

In the Greek-reading East, it seems the work was more popular, but still failed to be included in later canon lists. The Eastern Orthodox Canon was laid out in the Quinisext Council in Trullo (692 CE). The Trullo list included the first three books of Maccabees, but did not include 4 Maccabees as canonical. Historically, the Greek Orthodox Church and the Georgian Orthodox Church printed 4 Maccabees in their Bibles together with the rest of the Old Testament, but this did not entail that they officially considered 4 Maccabees "canonical." More recently, the Greek Church moved it to an appendix and a recent Georgian Bible marks it as "noncanonical." It was included in the 1688 Romanian Orthodox and the 18th-century Romanian Catholic Bibles where it was called "Iosip" (Josephus). It is no longer printed in Romanian Bibles today.

The Syriac, Coptic, and Ethiopic language Oriental Orthodox Churches do not include the book as canonical either. Some ancient manuscripts of the Syriac Orthodox church include the work, but this trend eventually stopped.

== Manuscripts and translations ==
4 Maccabees is in two of the three of the most ancient manuscripts of the Septuagint: the Codex Sinaiticus (4th century) and the Codex Alexandrinus (5th century). It is not, however, in the Codex Vaticanus. With the exception of the section 5:12-12:1, it is found also in the eight or ninth-century Codex Venetus. There are over 70 extant Greek manuscripts of 4 Maccabees.

Four pre-modern translations of 4 Maccabees are known. There survives a complete Syriac translation, as well as a Latin adaptation under the title Passio Sanctorum Machabaeorum (Suffering of the Holy Maccabees). One of the Syriac versions was titled The Fourth Book of the Maccabees and Their Mother. The Latin text was made around the same time as Ambrose's De Jacob et vita beata (388), which includes an independent partial translation of 4 Maccabees. The Passio was probably completed before the appearance of the Vulgate Bible in 405–406 and was probably produced in Gaul. Fragments of an abridged Sahidic Coptic translation were discovered by Enzo Lucchesi in the 1980s. They have been edited and translated into English. Maximus the Greek produced an abridged Slavonic translation.

The Fourth Book of Maccabees is not in the Vulgate and so is absent from the Apocrypha of the Roman Bible as well as from Protestant Bibles.

Erasmus published at Cologne in 1517, expanded in 1524, a very free Latin paraphrase of 4 Maccabees, possibly based on the Passio. After the invention of the printing press, 4 Maccabees was first mass printed in a 1526 edition of the Septuagint made in Strasbourg, albeit one based on a less reliable manuscript with a number of printer's errors.

The work is included in the Revised Standard Version (RSV), the New Revised Standard Version (NRSV), and New Revised Standard Version Updated Edition (NRSVUE).

The Lexham English Septuagint: A New Translation (LES), published in 2020, includes 4 Maccabees.

== Bibliography ==
- deSilva, David A. (1998). Knibb, Michael A. (ed.). 4 Maccabees. Guides to Apocrypha and Pseudepigrapha. Sheffield: Sheffield Academic Press. ISBN 1850758964.
- Hadas, Moses (1953). The Third and Fourth Books of Maccabees. New York: Harper & Brothers. LCCN 53-5114.
- van Henten, Jan Willem (1997). The Maccabean Martyrs as Saviours of the Jewish People. Leiden: Brill. ISBN 90-04-10976-5.

4 Maccabees E. Orthodox; Deuterocanon / Apocrypha
Preceded by 3 Maccabees	E. Orthodox; Books of the Bible	Succeeded by Job
