= Books of the Maccabees =

Group of ancient Hebrew books

The Books of the Maccabees or the Sefer HaMakabim (the Book of the Maccabees) recount the history of the Maccabees, the leaders of the Jewish rebellion against the Seleucid dynasty.

== List of books ==
The Books of the Maccabees refers to deuterocanonical books of the Bible and to several biblical apocryphal works:

- 1 Maccabees, originally written in Hebrew and only surviving in a Greek translation, it contains an account of the history of the Maccabees from 175 BC until 134 BC.
- 2 Maccabees, Jason of Cyrene's Greek abridgment of an earlier history which was written in Hebrew, recounts the history of the Maccabees from 176 BC until 161 BC. It focuses on Judas Maccabeus, and it also describes prayers for the dead and offerings.
- 3 Maccabees, a Greek narrative that contains an account of Egyptian Jews being delivered from their impending martyrdom at the hands of Ptolemy IV Philopator in the 3rd century BC.
- 4 Maccabees, a Greek philosophic discourse that praises the supremacy of reason over passion, using the Maccabean martyrs as examples.
- 5 Maccabees, an Arabic text which offers an account of the history of the Maccabees from 186 BC to 6 BC. The same title is occasionally ascribed to a Syriac version of the 6th book of Josephus' The Jewish War.
- 6 Maccabees, a Syriac poem that possibly shared a lost source with 4 Maccabees.
- 7 Maccabees, a Syriac text which contains transcripts of speeches which were made by the Maccabean Martyrs and their mother.
- 8 Maccabees, in Greek, a brief account of the revolt which draws on Seleucid sources, preserved in the Chronicle of John Malalas (pp. 206–207 in Dindorf).

The first two books are considered canonical by the Catholic Church and the first three books are considered canonical by the Eastern Orthodox Church. The Georgian Orthodox Church is the only church which also considers 4 Maccabees canonical. All of the other books are considered biblical apocrypha. The Orthodox Tewahedo biblical canon includes none of the books which are listed above, instead, it includes three books of Ethiopic Maccabees (1 Meqabyan, 2 Meqabyan, and 3 Meqabyan), books which are distinct from those books which are listed above. There is also a non-canonical Jewish work which is titled the Megillat Antiochus ("The Scroll of Antiochus"). This book is read in some synagogues during the Jewish holiday of Hanukkah. The book is unrelated to the "Books of Maccabees" except for the fact that it cites some quotations which are contained in 1 and 2 Maccabees, and it also describes the same events which are described in 1 and 2 Maccabees.

== First versus Second Books of Maccabees ==
The books of First and Second Maccabees are written in noticeably different literary styles, but contain similar narratives.

In First Maccabees, the author presents an objective historical account of the persecution of the Jews by Antiochus IV. It deals with the rise and legitimacy of the Hasmonean dynasty, beginning with an account of the life of the Jewish priest Mattathias, a forefather of the Maccabean revolt. The sober style of First Maccabees takes influence from the authors of the Hebrew Bible.

In contrast, the author of Second Maccabees presents a heavily dramatic, emotional and theologically dense account of a period of time which is shorter but overlapping (180–161 BC). In Second Maccabees, the author portrays Judas Maccabaeus and the martyrs who fight alongside him as champions; they earn divine favor as a result. The book begins with two letters (Epistles I and II), but these are insubstantial in relation to the narrative.

== See also ==
- Meqabyan
