= Wolfgang Willrich =

German painter (1897–1948)

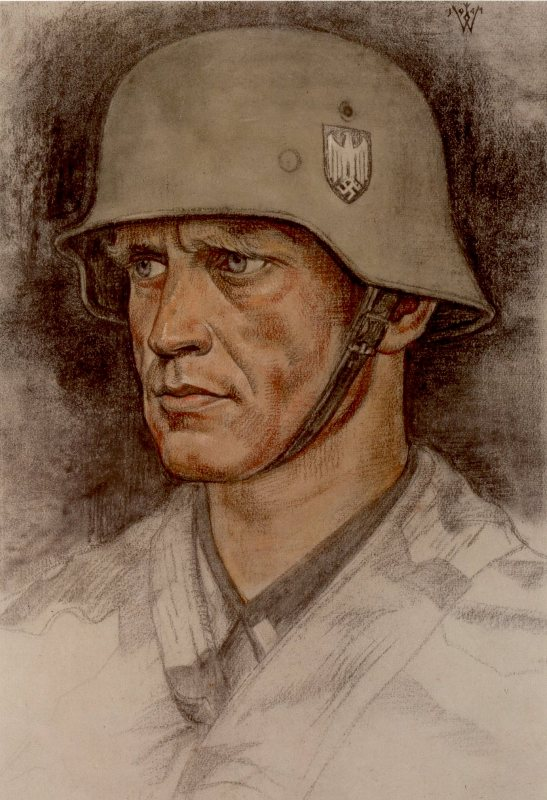
- Self-Portrait as a Feldwebel of the Wehrmacht, 1941
- Born: Wolfgang Willrich; 31 March 1897; Göttingen, German Empire
- Died: 18 October 1948 (aged 51); Göttingen, Germany
- Education: Berlin University of the Arts, Dresden Academy of Fine Arts
- Known for: Painting, drawing

Wolfgang Willrich (31 March 1897 – 18 October 1948) was a German artist of the 20th century, who created propaganda art during the time of Nazi Germany. In 1933, Willrich was employed by the Nazi government, for which he drew art depicting idealized racial standards and portraits of soldiers and party officials.

== Biography ==
Willrich was born on 31 March 1897 in Göttingen. His father, Hugo Willrich, was a hellenist and honorary professor of classical philology at the University of Göttingen. Willrich started painting at an early age. In 1915, he attended the Berlin University of the Arts.

In 1916, he was called up for service during World War I, serving as a Feldwebel in the 251st Infantry Regiment on the Western Front. As a Feldwebel, he received the Iron Cross. He was captured by the French and was interned in Orleans until 1920. During his internment, he created war art. After his release, Willrich resumed his studies in 1921 at the Dresden Academy of Fine Arts.

From 1933 to 1934, Willrich worked at the Reich Chamber of Culture, but was forced out due to his association with the Tannenbergbund. He worked for Richard Walther Darré, Reich Minister of Agriculture.

In 1935, Willrich declined becoming a full member of the Nazi Party.

Willrich authored two books on art, Säuberung des Kunsttempels (The Cleaning of the Temple of Art, 1937) and Des Edlen Ewiges Reich (Of the Noble, Eternal Reich). The books condemned the art of the Weimar Republic as Degenerate art and encouraged the expression of racial consciousness in art. He was a member of Adolf Ziegler’s five-man committee, which in early July 1937 selected approximately 1,100 artworks from 30 museums to be sent to Munich for the "Degenerate Art" exhibition.

In 1945, Willrich was captured by the United States Army in Normandy and imprisoned. He was released in 1946.

Willrich died in 1948. He had started an autobiography which was completed by his wife in 1987.

== Gallery ==
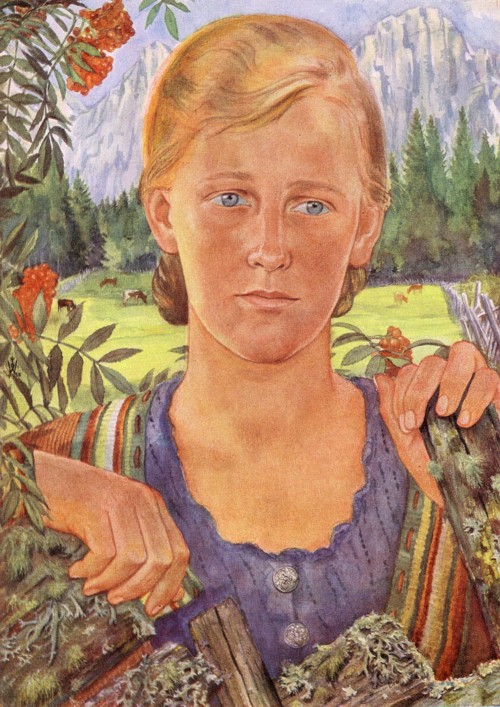
Josefa Wieser, 1938

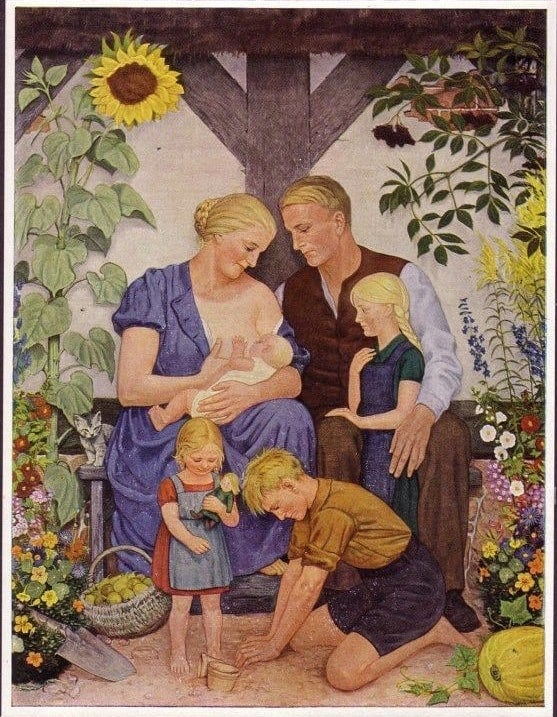
Familienbildniss (Family), 1938

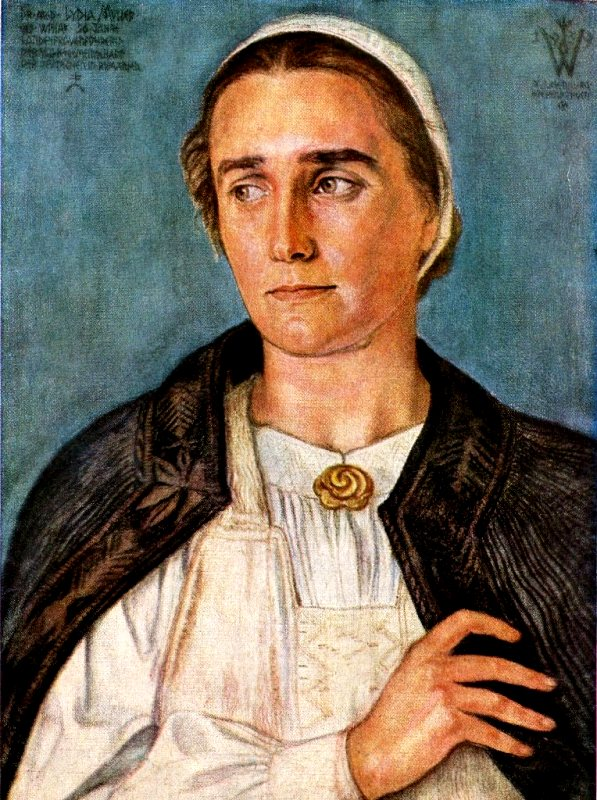
Dr. med. Lydia Müller, 1939

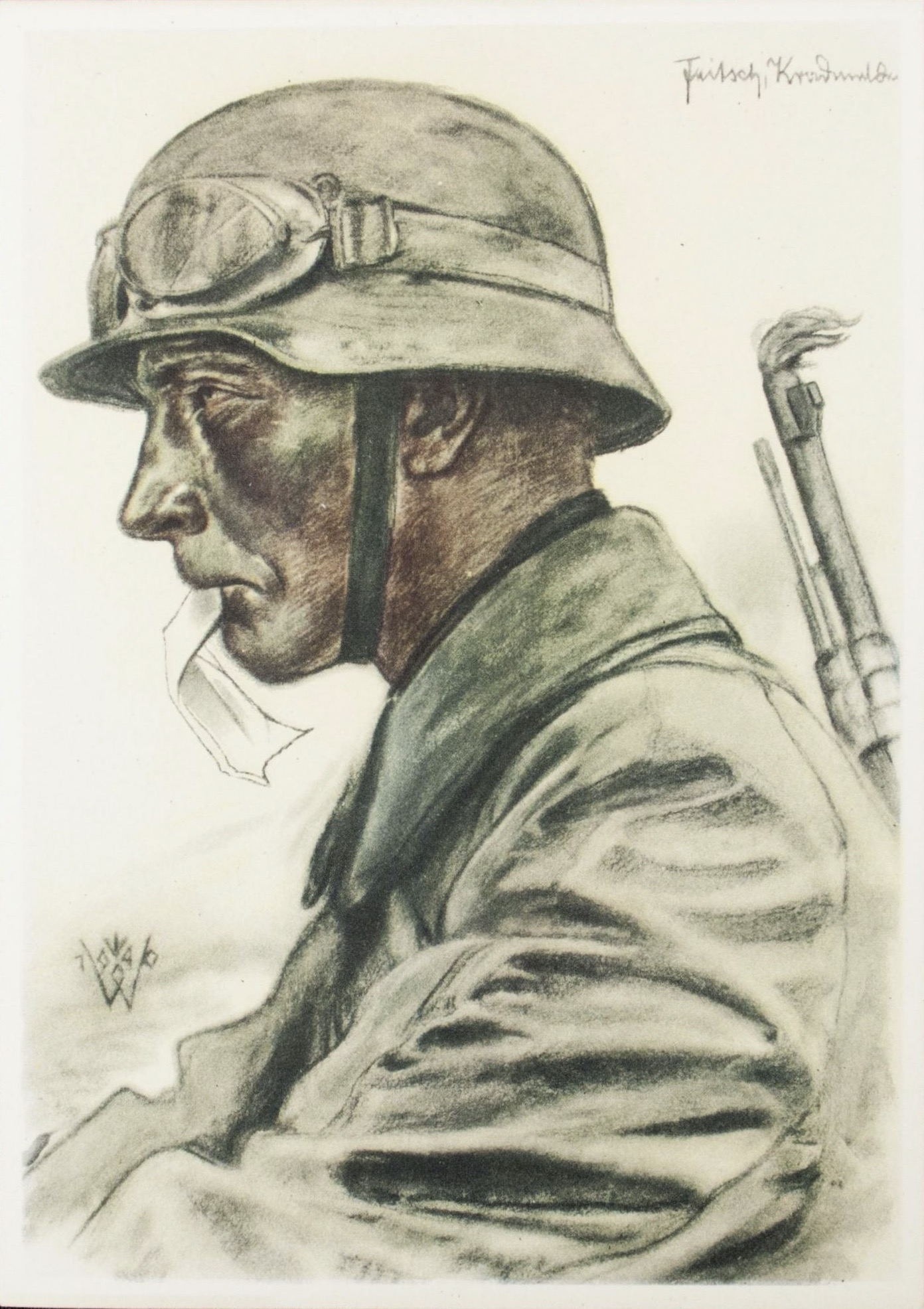
Soldier, 1940

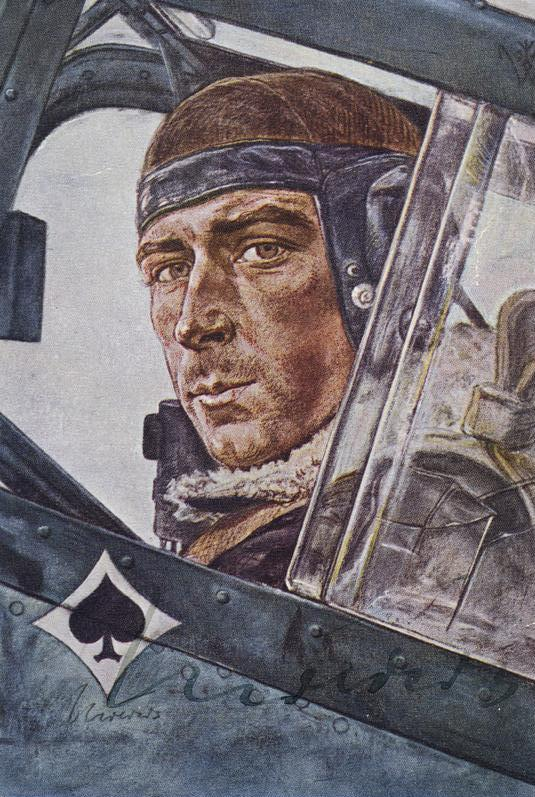
Werner Mölders, 1941

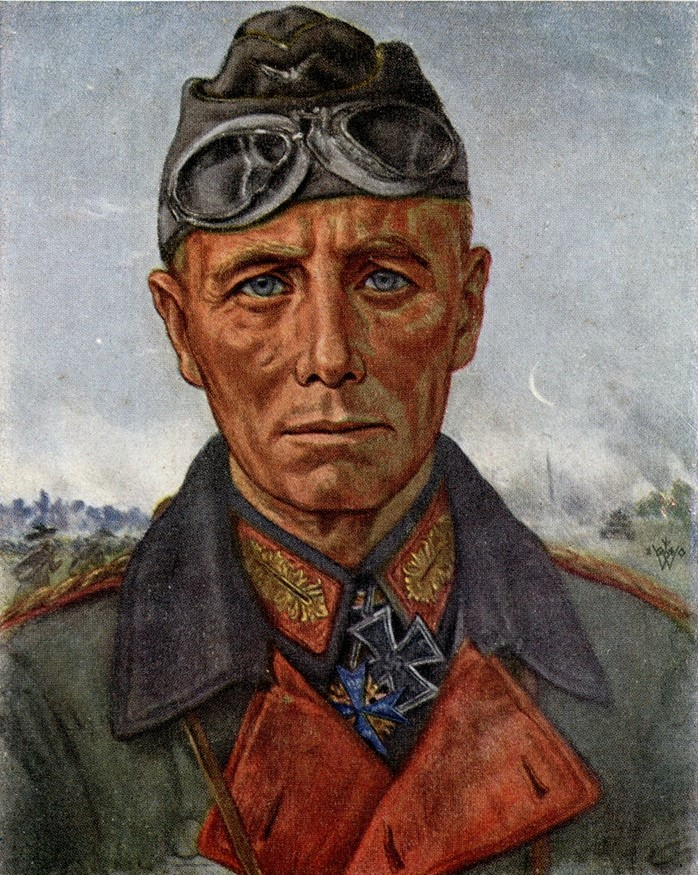
Erwin Rommel, 1941

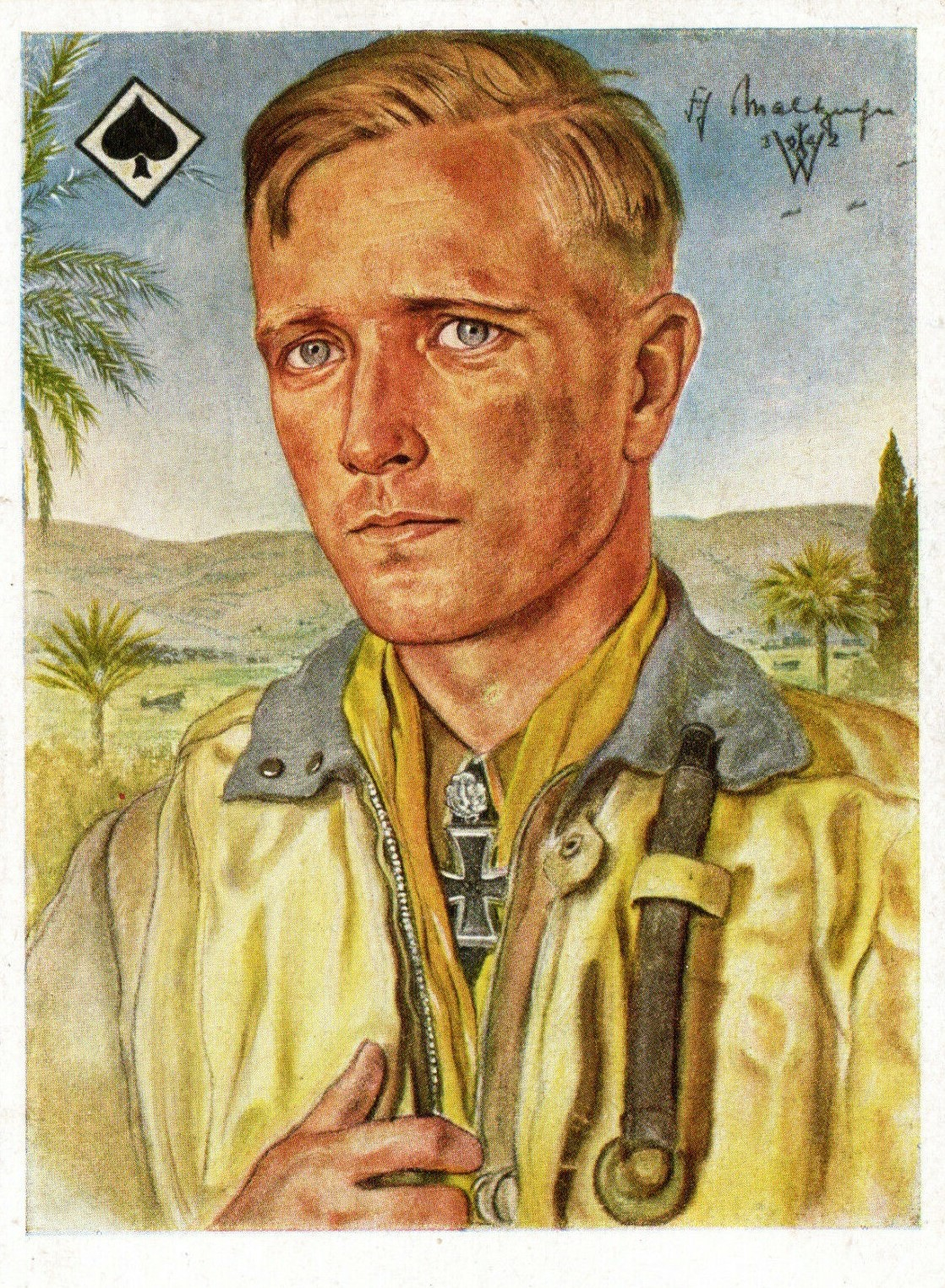
Günther Freiherr von Maltzahn, 1942

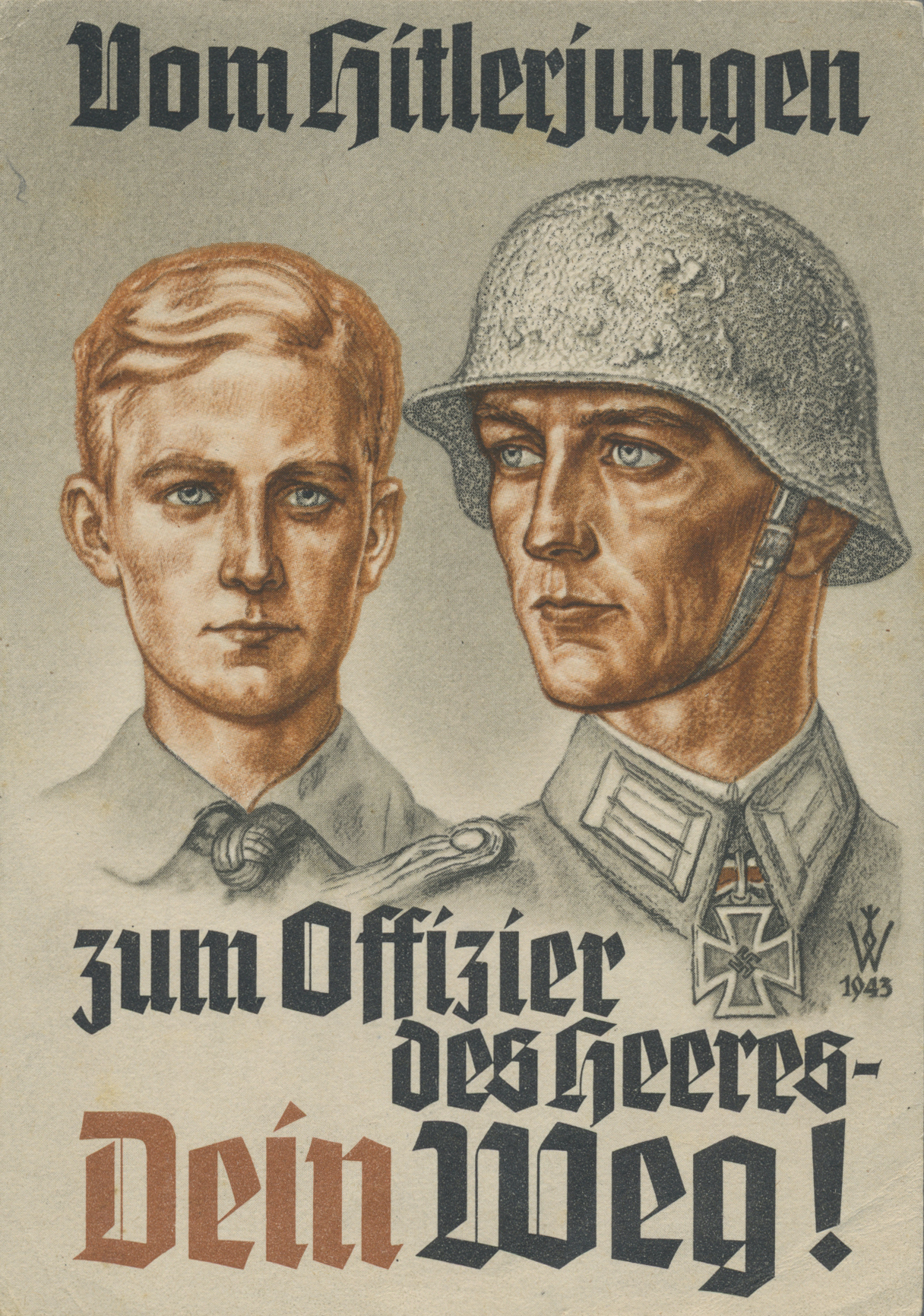
"From Hitler Youth to Officer of the Army - Your Way!", 1943

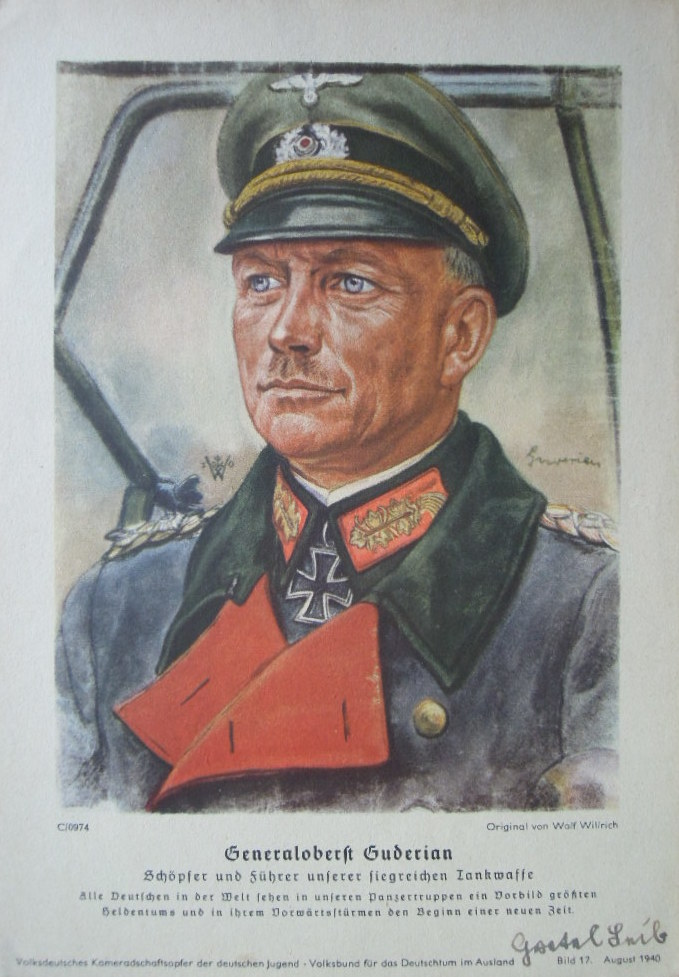
Heinz Guderian, 1940

== See also ==
- Art in Nazi Germany
- Degenerate Art
- Heroic Realism
- Nazi Propaganda
