= Eleazar (2 Maccabees) =

Jewish martyr

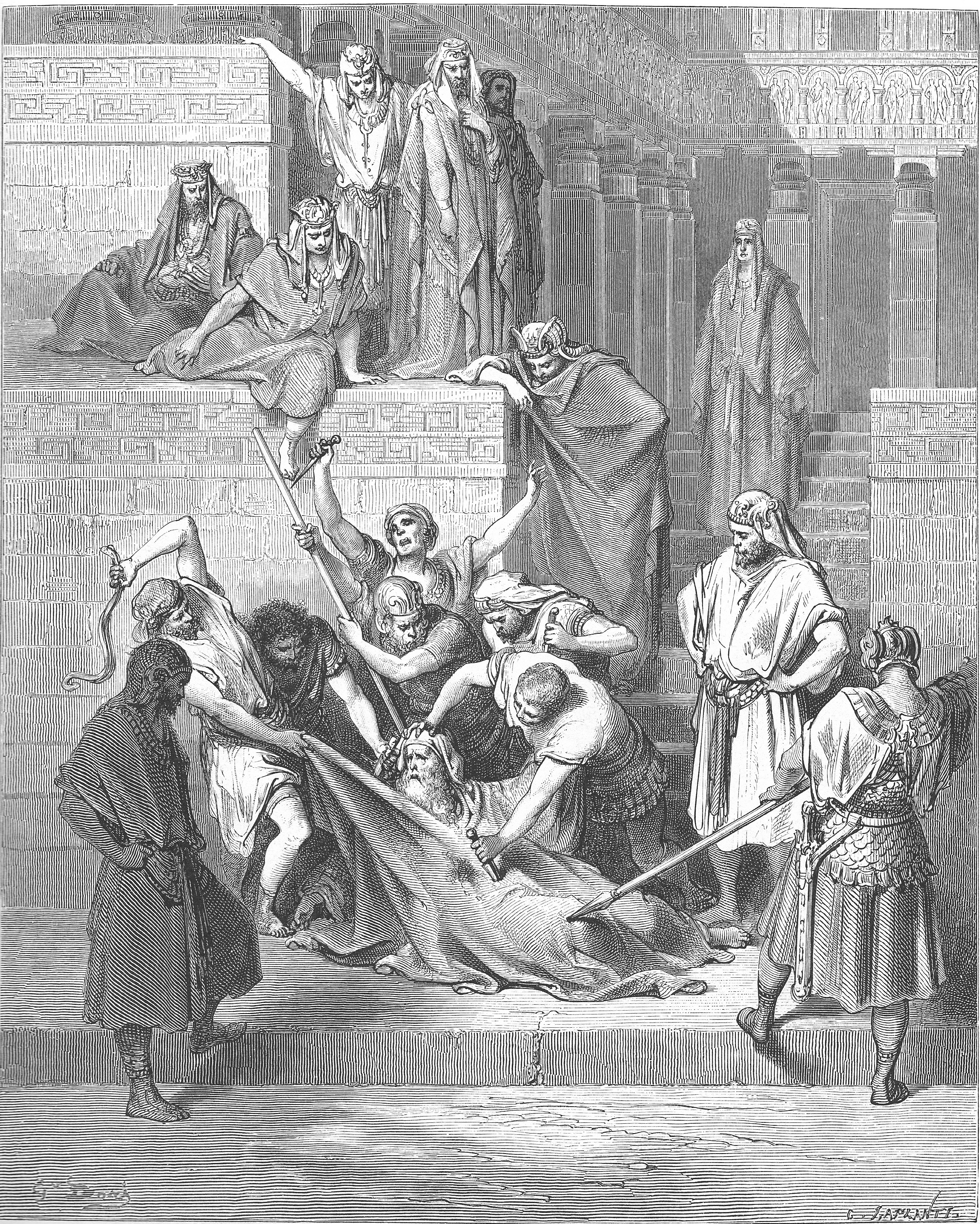
The Martyrdom of Eleazar the Scribe by Gustave Doré, 1866.

Eleazar was a Jewish martyr who died during the persecution of Judaism in Judea ordered by King Antiochus IV Epiphanes. Together with the woman with seven sons, he is one of the "Holy Maccabean Martyrs" celebrated by the Roman Catholic, Eastern Orthodox, and Oriental Orthodox churches. In the Eastern Orthodox calendar their feast day is August 1.

The main source of information about Eleazar is the book 2 Maccabees, although a variant account of someone named Eleazar is found in 3 Maccabees.

== Depiction in 2 Maccabees ==
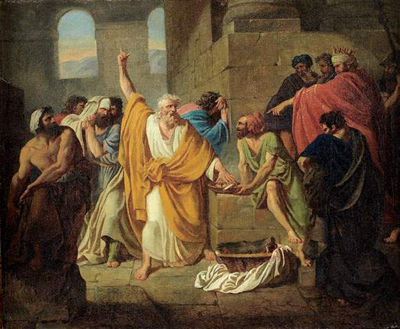
La constance d'Eléazar, an 18th-century oil painting by Jean Germain Drouais

Those who were in charge of that unlawful sacrifice took the man aside because of their long acquaintance with him, and privately urged him to bring meat of his own providing, proper for him to use, and to pretend that he was eating the flesh of the sacrificial meal that had been commanded by the king (...) But making a high resolve, worthy of his years and the dignity of his old age and the grey hairs that he [Eleazar] had reached with distinction and his excellent life even from childhood, and moreover according to the holy God-given law, he declared himself quickly, telling them to send him to Hades.

— 2 Maccabees 6:21, 23

The books of Maccabees describe a period of intense persecution of traditional Judaism by Antiochus IV Epiphanes, King of the Seleucid Empire that ruled Judea at the time (around 168–166 BCE). According to 2 Maccabees 6, Eleazar was an elderly and respected scribe. As part of the persecution, Jews were forbidden from keeping Jewish dietary law (kashrut); to break the practice, leading members of the community were required to publicly engage in performances of pork-eating. Eleazar was expected to do such a public performance. Some of his friends suggested he arrange to have some false meat ready, validly prepared under Jewish law, such that Eleazar could appear to be breaking the law, yet not truly break it. Eleazar sharply rebuked his friends and refused the offer, however, wishing to avoid even the appearance of breaking Jewish law. He did not wish for young Jews to think that Eleazar had gone over to a foreign religion merely to live a brief while longer and "defile and disgrace my old age". Instead, he dramatically spits out the food.

As a result, Eleazar is dragged off to a torture device. (The Greek word is tympanum (τύμπανον), usually meaning "drum", but in this case a circular drum-like rack.) There, he is tortured to death, but dies as an example of courage. The following chapter, 2 Maccabees 7, describes the martyrdom of the woman with seven sons, and is an immediate "answer" to Eleazar's concerns of setting a poor example: it shows seven Jewish youths remaining firm in their Judaism. In the narrative of 2 Maccabees, the wrath of God in allowing the persecution turns to mercy after the example of the martyrs, resulting in the eventual success of the Maccabean Revolt.

The depiction of Eleazar's death bears some similarities to the death of Socrates, with both being exemplars of Hellenistic ideals of a noble and proper death. Eleazar makes a final statement of his principles, as if he is a defendant at a trial and calling on God as a witness.

Due to a variety of reasons, 2 Maccabees was kept as part of the Septuagint, a collection of Jewish scripture in Greek that became the basis for the Christian Old Testament, but did not become a text in Rabbinic Judaism, the form of Judaism that survived the decline of Hellenistic Judaism and the destruction of the Second Temple. The result was that despite being martyred for keeping Jewish law, Eleazar was more honored in Christianity, where the "Maccabean martyrs" were considered as prefiguring the death of Jesus. Medieval and early modern Christianity often treated the martyrs more as proto-Christians than as Jews.

== Depiction in 3 Maccabees ==
Then a certain Eleazar, famous among the priests of the country, who had attained a ripe old age and throughout his life had been adorned with every virtue, directed the elders around him to stop calling upon the holy God, and he prayed.

— 3 Maccabees 6:1

A person named Eleazar also appears in the book 3 Maccabees, although that book is generally distrusted as a reliable source of history. It is set decades earlier than the reign of Antiochus IV in Ptolemaic Egypt rather than Judea, and describes a claimed persecution during the reign of Ptolemy IV Philopator. In it, Eleazar prays for deliverance of the Jews of Egypt, and God sends two invisible angels in response to his prayer who turn Ptolemy's elephants against his own men rather than the Jews. The Eleazar there is not explicitly identified as the same as the Eleazar of 2 Maccabees, but is described in similar terms, and seems to be a literary reference (as the Eleazar there is already described as old, but should be middle-aged if he was really the same person).
