= Hugo Willrich =

Hugo Willrich (August 20, 1867 – June 20, 1950) was a German teacher and classical historian of the Hellenistic era and Roman era. He was also a scholar of Hellenistic Judaism, albeit from a secular German Protestant perspective. He was born in Pomerania, but spent most of his life living in Göttingen. He eventually became a firm antisemite who advocated harsh measures against German Jews, and was active in organizing local antisemitic groups in Göttingen.

== Biography ==
Hugo Willrich was born on August 20, 1867, in Kummerow in Landkreis Regenwalde in Pomerania, then part of the North German Confederation. He was educated in Greifenberg (modern day Gryfice) and passed his university examination there. He studied classical philology and history in Berlin at first, and from 1887 at the University of Göttingen. Among others, he studied under the classicist Ulrich von Wilamowitz-Moellendorff. During his studies he joined the Verein Deutscher Studenten, a German fraternity organization. He took a teaching examination in 1890 and performed military service; afterward, Willrich received his doctorate in 1893. His thesis was on the Catilinarian conspiracy (~63 BCE) in the Roman Republic. He received his habilitation in 1896 in ancient history.

In the years that followed, he taught at the University of Göttingen as a privatdozent, but was not offered a professorship. In 1904 he went into teaching at the Gymnasium (loosely equivalent to American high school) level and taught as an Oberlehrer (senior teacher) at the Royal Gymnasium in Göttingen (now known as the Max Planck Gymnasium). In 1914, Willrich's military status was reactivated as a reserve lieutenant for service in World War I; he was wounded in Flanders in 1914. He still occasionally did teaching at the university, and was made an honorary professor in 1917. After Professor Georg Busolt's death, he filled in for him in 1920 and 1921 at the university. At the Gymnasium, he received a promotion to Oberstudienrat in 1925. Willrich retired in 1931, and died in 1950.

Willrich had three children, two daughters and a son. His son, Wolfgang Willrich, was an artist friendly with the Nazis and in agreement with their views on art. He helped stage the Degenerate Art exhibition and attacked modern art. Wolfgang predeceased his father, dying in 1948. Conversely, his daughter Ingeborg Willrich opposed the Nazis. She voted "no" in the 1934 German referendum. She worked as a public school teacher but refused to take the Hitler Oath required for all civil servants, and was dismissed from her position without entitlement to a pension in December 1934. She was forced to work as a private instructor instead until 1937, when her continued refusal to take the oath resulted in this being denied to her as well. She was only able to find petty work afterward.

== Political views ==
During the Weimar era, Willrich was a member of the German National People's Party, the national-conservative party. Willrich became a fierce antisemite later in his life who criticized Jews as the source of Germany's troubles and advocated for antisemitic government policies. In 1919, reeling after Germany's defeat, he founded the Verband zur Befreiung vom Judenjoch in Göttingen ("Association for the Liberation from the Jewish Yoke"), which performed activities such as compiling lists of Jewish-owned shops in Göttingen and urging a boycott of them. The organization was largely successful; by the early 1930s, several Jewish shops in Göttingen were obliged to sell to non-Jews, and students were radicalized into passing pamphlets and notes urging citizens not to buy from Jews. He was a co-founder of the Göttingen branch of the Deutschvölkischer Schutz- und Trutzbund. In 1921, he published the book Die Entstehung des Antisemitismus ("The Creation of Antisemitism"). He was also involved with compiling the "Archiv für berufsständische Rassenstatistik", an attempt that began in 1925 to document which Germans citizens were of Jewish descent.

Despite his antisemitism, Willrich never directly joined the Nazi Party, staying a German National even after the Nazis took power. The Nazis turned on him in 1940; he was denounced because he continued to associate with Gustav Meyer of Hann. Münden, whom the government considered a "full Jew." It seems that Willrich's antisemitism was of the kind that encouraged and allowed large-scale attacks on faceless Jews, but allowed for exceptional "good Jews" known personally to be trusted and normal friends.

== Works ==
Willrich published various books and journal articles. He also wrote entries in the encyclopedia Realencyclopädie der classischen Altertumswissenschaft (also known as Pauly's). His work includes:

- De conjurationis Catilinariae fontibus. Göttingen 1893 (Dissertation)
- Juden und Griechen vor der makkabäischen Erhebung. Göttingen 1895
- Eine neue Inschrift zur Geschichte des ersten Mithradatischen Krieges. In: Hermes Band 33 (1898), p. 657–661
- Wer liess König Philipp von Makedonien ermorden? In: Hermes Band 34 (1899), p. 174–182
- Krateros und der Grabherr des Alexandersarkophags von Sidon. In: Hermes Band 34 (1899), p. 231–250
- Alabanda und Rom zur Zeit des ersten Krieges gegen Mithradates. In: Hermes Band 34 (1899), p. 305–311
- Judaica. Forschungen zur hellenistisch-jüdischen Geschichte und Litteratur. Göttingen 1900
- Caligula. In: Klio. Beiträge zur alten Geschichte. Band 3 (1903)
- Der historische Kern des III. Makkabaeerbuches. In: Hermes Band 39 (1904), p. 244–258
- Livia. Leipzig 1911
- Die Welfenherrschaft in Hannover. Göttingen 1920
- Die Entstehung des Antisemitismus. München 1921
- Urkundenfälschung in der hellenistisch-jüdischen Literatur. Göttingen 1924
- Das Haus des Herodes zwischen Jerusalem und Rom. Heidelberg 1929
- Perikles. Göttingen 1936
- Cicero und Cäsar. Göttingen 1944
