= Elias Joseph Bickerman =

Russian historian and university teacher (1897–1981)

Elias J Bickerman
- Born: July 1, 1897 O.S. Kishinev, Russian Empire (modern Moldova)
- Died: August 31, 1981 (aged 84); Jerusalem
- Occupations: Classicist, Ancient Historian, Jewish Historian

Elias Bickerman (July 7, 1897 O.S. – August 31, 1981), also spelled as Bickermann or Bikerman, was a leading scholar of Greco-Roman history and the Hellenistic world.

== Biography ==
Bickerman was born in Kishinev, then part of the Russian Empire, to a secular Jewish family. He left Russia during the Bolshevik revolution and the Russian Civil War for Germany, where he received education from German classicists and Hellenists. Due to the rise of the Nazi Party to power and his Jewish heritage, he fled to France. He soon had to abandon that country as well after the Battle of France. From 1942, he lived in the United States. His research interests extended to Judaism and some aspects of Iranian history. For most of his career, he was Professor of Ancient History at Columbia University, New York.

== Work ==
Bickerman's scholarship of the Maccabean revolt was highly influential. Rather than the more traditionalist reading of an evil Seleucid king fighting a unified Jewish opposition, Bickerman emphasized that much of the conflict was in internal Jewish tensions in Judea of the era. He showed that the Hasmonean leadership were not as anti-Hellenist as often portrayed, at least after gaining a measure of autonomy. He also made strong cases for the authenticity of documents found in the book of 2 Maccabees, showing that they matched other Seleucid documents of the era, had correct titles, and were in general plausible.

A partial list of books includes:

- The God of the Maccabees (Berlin, 1937; English translation, 1979)
- Institutions des Séleucides (Paris, 1938)
- From Ezra to the Last of the Maccabees (New York, 1962)
- Studies in Jewish and Christian History (3 volumes, Leiden, 1976–1986)
- Religion and Politics in the Hellenistic and Roman Periods (Como, 1985)
- The Jews in the Greek Age (Cambridge, Mass., 1990)
