= Woman with seven sons =

Jewish martyr described in 2 Maccabees 7

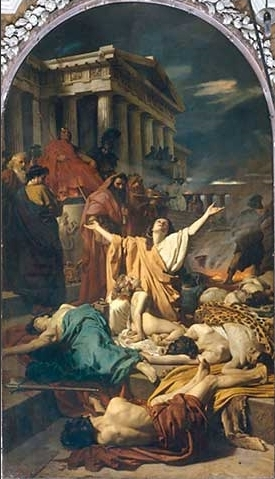
Antonio Ciseri's Martyrdom of the Seven Maccabees (1863), depicting the woman with her dead sons

The woman with seven sons was a Jewish martyr described in the deuterocanonical 2 Maccabees 7 and elaborated in 4 Maccabees. She and her seven sons were arrested during the persecution of Judaism initiated by King Antiochus IV Epiphanes. They were ordered to consume pork and thus violate Jewish law as part of the campaign. They repeatedly refused, and Antiochus tortured and killed the sons one by one in front of the unflinching and stout-hearted mother before eventually killing her as well.

The historical setting of the story is around the beginning of the persecution of Jews by Antiochus IV (c. 167/166 BCE) that led to the Maccabean Revolt. Although unnamed in 2 Maccabees, the mother is known variously as Hannah, Miriam, Solomonia, and Shmouni.

Other versions of the story appear in Jewish sources such as the Talmud and Josippon.

== Narrative ==
=== 2 Maccabees ===
The book 2 Maccabees depicts events during the turbulent period of the 170s and 160s BCE. King Antiochus IV Epiphanes of the Seleucid Empire which then ruled Judea departs on a campaign in the Sixth Syrian War, but becomes enraged after what he interprets as a Jewish revolt. He issues decrees forbidding various traditional Jewish practices, such as keeping kosher and circumcision of sons. The mother and seven sons are swept up in this persecution and are arrested. They are brought directly before Antiochus, tortured, and ordered to eat pork or die. One of the brothers says that even if they were all to die, they would not break the law. The angry king orders the pans and cauldrons heated, and orders that the first brother's tongue be cut off, that the skin be removed from his head, and that the ends of his limbs be cut off. These orders are carried out in the presence of the other six brothers and the mother, who, in the meantime, encourage each other to resist the tormentors' demands. While the first brother is inert and still breathing, Epiphanes orders him thrown into the hot pan. After the first brother dies, the skin is stripped from the next brother's head. Each brother is killed in the same way, all in view of their tenacious and rather stoic mother, who thus loses all her sons.

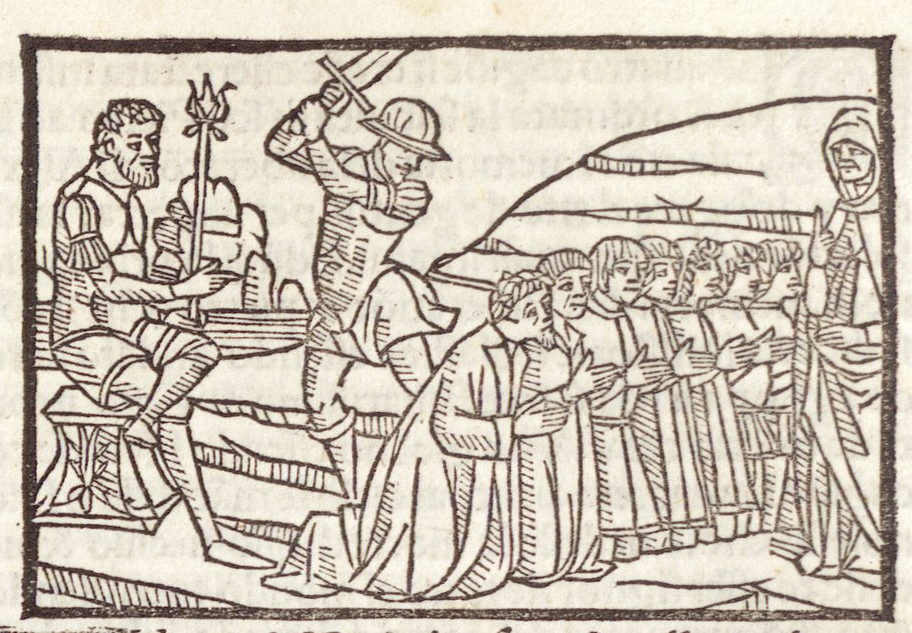
The Martyrdom of the Seven Maccabees in the Golden Legend (1497)

The narrator mentions that the mother "was the most remarkable of all, and deserves to be remembered with special honour. She watched her seven sons die in the space of a single day, yet she bore it bravely because she put her trust in the Lord." Each of the sons makes a speech as he dies, and the last one says that his brothers are "dead under God's covenant of everlasting life". The narrator ends by saying that the mother died, without saying whether she was executed, or died in some other way.

=== Talmud and Midrash ===
The Talmud tells a similar story, but with refusal to worship an idol replacing refusal to eat pork. Tractate Gittin 57b cites Rabbi Judah as saying that "this refers to the woman and her seven sons". The woman is not named and the king is referred to as the "Caesar". In this version of the story, each son goes to his death while citing a different verse from the Torah prohibiting idolatry. The Caesar takes pity on the seventh son and offers to drop his royal seal on the ground so that the son can pick it up and thus accept his royal authority. He refuses, proclaiming that the glory of heaven is more important to him than the glory of a mortal king. As he is being led off to be killed, his mother tells him: "My son, go and say to your father Abraham, you bound [a son] to one altar; I bound [sons] to seven altars." The story concludes with the woman's suicide: she "went up on to a roof and threw herself down and was killed." A heavenly voice then proclaims, "A joyful mother of children (Psalms 113:9)."

A similar version of the tale occurs in the midrashic text Lamentations Rabbah (Chapter 1). In this version the woman is named Miriam bat Nahtom (Miriam, the Baker's Daughter). The story concludes similarly to the version in the Talmud, but in this version the youngest son holds a long conversation with the Caesar, proving from Biblical verses the superiority of his God and the system of reward and punishment. When the moment arrives for him to be executed, the mother insists that she be killed first. The Caesar refuses on account that the Torah prohibits killing an animal and its offspring on the same day (see Leviticus 22:28). The mother retorts "Fool! Have you already fulfilled all the commandments and only this one remains?"

=== Other versions ===
Other versions of the story are found in 4 Maccabees (which suggests that the woman might have thrown herself into the flames, 17:1) and Josippon (which says she fell dead on her sons' corpses). The Josippon version of the story probably was paraphrased from a Latin version of 2 Maccabees, and was notable as the first major exposure of medieval Jewish audiences to the story.

== Names ==
Various sources have proposed names for this woman. In Lamentations Rabbah she is called Miriam bat Nahtom, in the Eastern Orthodox tradition she is known as Solomonia, while in the Armenian Apostolic Church she is called Shamuna, and in Syriac Christianity she is known as Shmuni. She is called "Hannah" (or "Chana") in Josippon, perhaps as a result of connecting her with Hannah in the Book of Samuel, who says that the "barren woman bears seven" (1 Samuel 2:5). Gerson Cohen notes that this occurs only in the longer Spanish version of Josippon (1510), while the shorter Mantuan version (c. 1480) continues to refer to her anonymously.

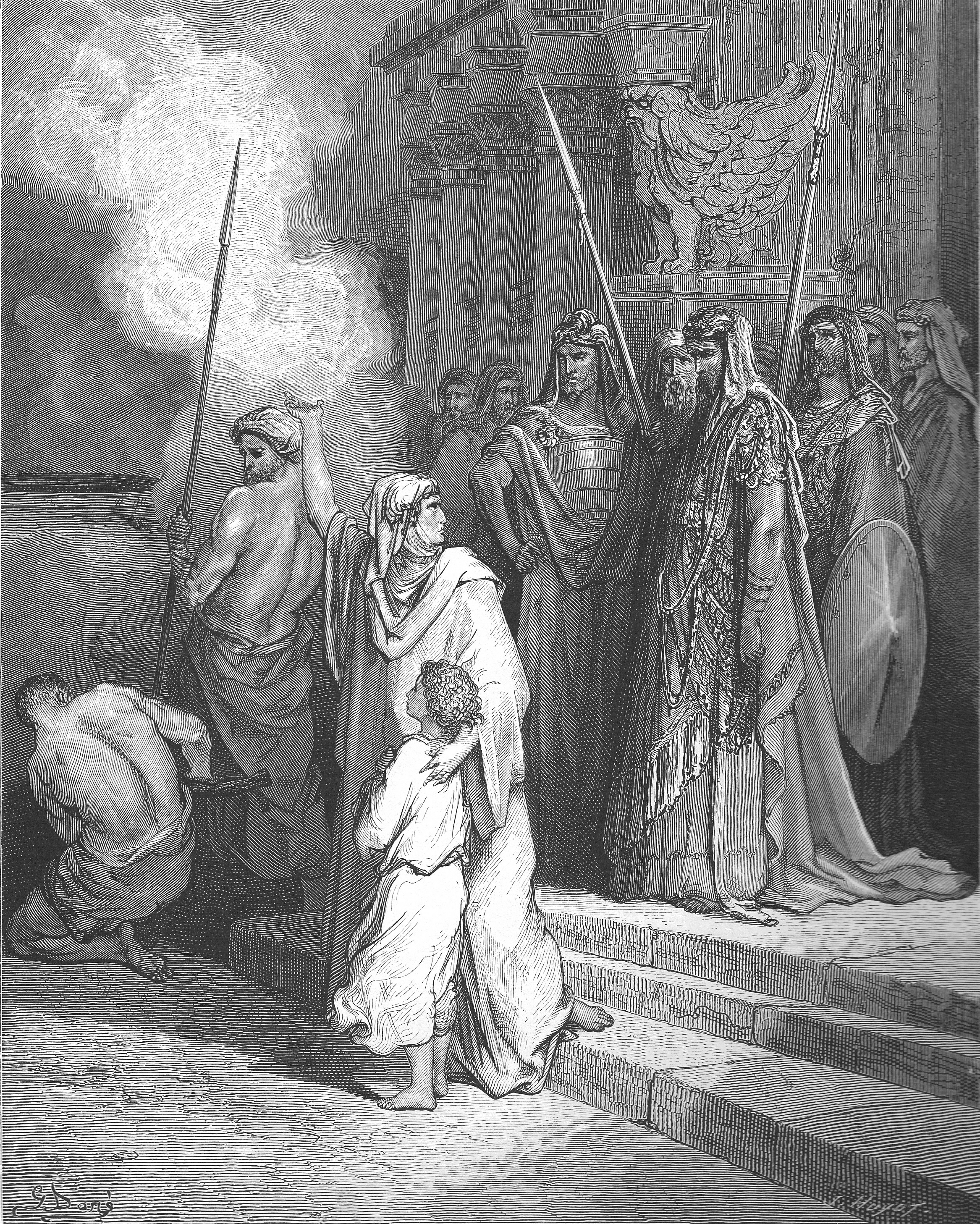
The Courage of a Mother, one of Gustave Doré's illustrations for La Grande Bible de Tours, 1866

In the Syriac 6 Maccabees, the sons are named Gadday, Maqqbay, Tarsay, Hebron, Hebson, Bakkos and Yonadab.

== Legacy ==
The woman with seven sons is remembered with high regard for her religious steadfastness, teaching her sons to keep to their faith, even if it meant execution. The Maccabees story reflects a theme of the book, that "the strength of the Jews lies in the fulfillment of the practical mitzvot".

Jewish tradition has de-emphasised the books of Maccabees as non-canonical texts, particularly after the rise of Christianity and the catastrophic death and destruction that followed the failure of the Jewish Great Revolt and the Bar Kochba Revolt. Thus Jewish tradition has primarily recalled this story through the versions recorded in the Talmud and the Lamentations Rabbah.

For the Christians, the books of Maccabees stayed as part of scripture due to their place in the Septuagint, at least until the Protestant Reformation. As such, much there is a substantial amount of Christian medieval art and literature honoring the woman and her seven sons. However, the emphasis in the Maaccabees version of the story on the sons' refusal to break the Biblical dietary laws was problematic for medieval Christianity, which was characterised by its view that the ritual laws in the Bible had been superseded. The result was that Christian literature and art revered the martyrs, but downplayed their Jewishness.

It is probable that Hilary of Poitiers refers to this woman as a prophet. Hilary says "For all things, as the Prophet says, were made out of nothing," and, according to Patrick Henry Reardon, he is quoting 2 Maccabees 7:28.

According to Antiochene Christian tradition, the relics of the mother and sons were interred on the site of a synagogue (later converted into a church) in the Kerateion quarter of Antioch. On the other hand, tombs believed to be those of these martyrs were discovered in San Pietro in Vincoli in 1876. An additional tomb believed to be that of the woman with her seven sons is located in the Jewish cemetery of Safed.

She is called Mart Shmune in the Chaldean Catholic Church, and is the patron saint of the Assyrian village of Sharanish where a parish is named for her. Especially in Northern Iraque multiple churches are dedicated to her and her sons.

== Holy Maccabean Martyrs ==
The Holy Maccabees
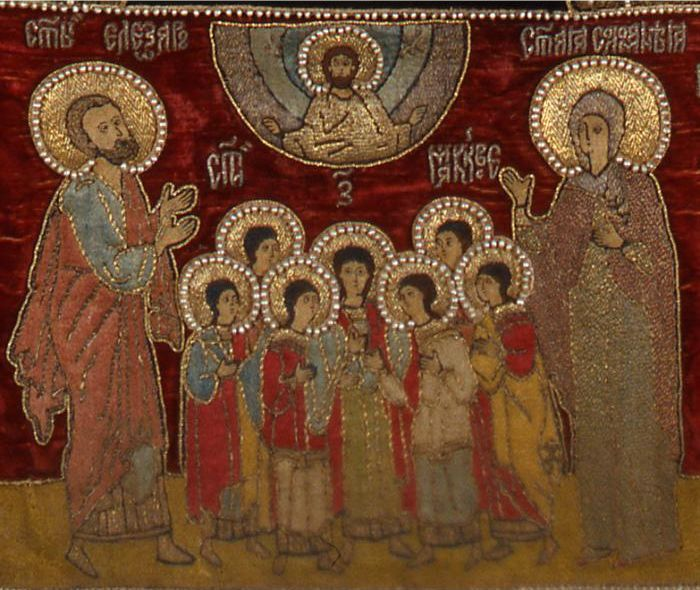
- The Holy Maccabee Martyrs, showing the Seven Brothers and their Mother, with Eleazar whose own martyrdom was in the previous passage.

Martyrs
- Born: 2nd century BC; Judea (modern-day Israel)
- Died: 167-160 BC; Judea
- Venerated in: Catholic Church; Eastern Orthodox Church; Oriental Orthodox Church
- Canonized: Pre-Congregation
- Feast: 1 August Eastern Orthodox Church, Traditional Catholics; 1st Tuesday in May Chaldean Catholic Church, Church of the East

Although they are not the same as the Hasmonean rulers called Maccabees, the woman and her sons, along with the Eleazar described in 2 Maccabees 6, are known as the "Holy Machabees" or "Holy Maccabean Martyrs" in the Catholic Church and the Eastern Orthodox Church.

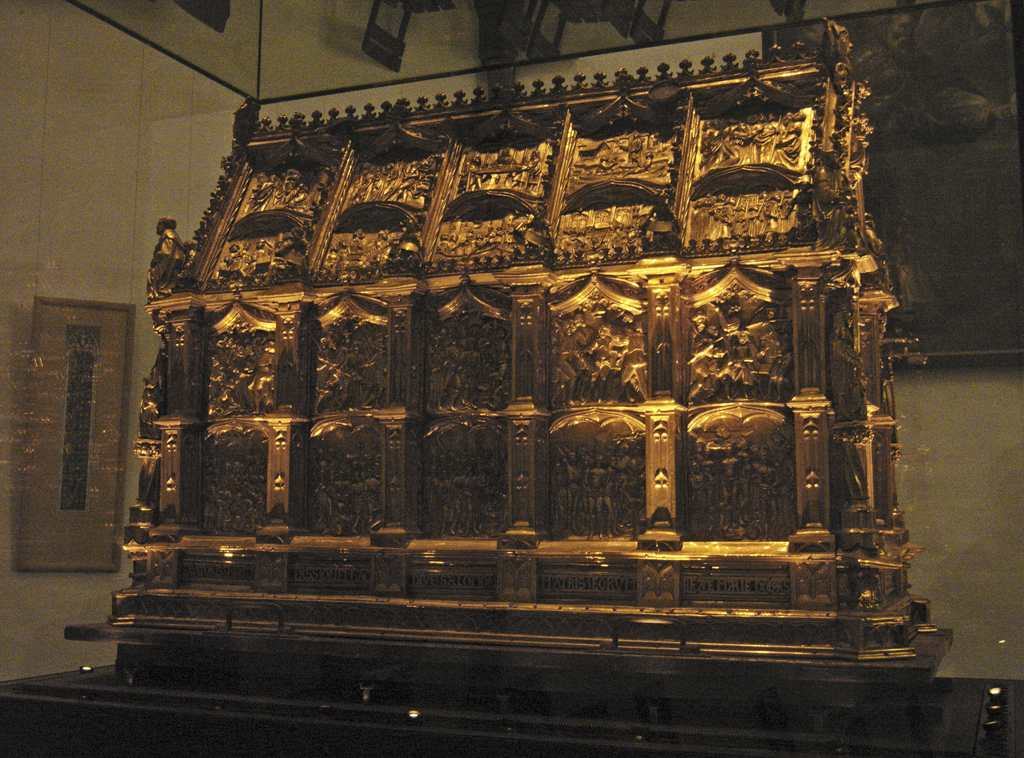
What is believed to be the Maccabees' relics – kept in the Maccabees Shrine – is venerated in St. Andrew Church, Cologne, Germany.

The Orthodox Church celebrates the Holy Maccabean Martyrs on August 1. The Catholic Church also includes them in its official list of saints that have August 1 as their feast day. From before the time of the Tridentine calendar, the Holy Maccabees had a commemoration in the Roman Rite liturgy within the feast of Saint Peter in Chains. This commemoration remained within the weekday liturgy when in 1960 Pope John XXIII suppressed this particular feast of Saint Peter. Nine years later, 1 August became the feast of Saint Alphonsus Maria de' Liguori while mention of the Maccabee martyrs was deleted from the General Roman Calendar, and its 1969 revision no longer admitted commemorations. It is still celebrated in the Traditional Latin Mass Tridentine calendar on August 1, and since they remain in the Roman Martyrology, they may still be venerated by all Catholics.

According to Eastern Orthodox tradition, the sons are called Abim, Antonius, Gurias, Eleazar, Eusebonus, Alimus and Marcellus, though the names differ slightly among different authorities. They are celebrated yearly during the Honey Feast of the Saviour.

The name Shmouni in the Syriac tradition is first made known in the report of Aphrahat. In one source, the name Maria appears alongside the name Shmouni. In the chronicle of Michael the Syrian ʿAbd-Shalom is identified as the father of the seven sons and is introduced as the brother of Mattathias. As a place of Martyrdom Antioch sometimes is mentioned instead of Jerusalem.

According to the Syriac Fenqitho (book of festal offices), the name of the mother is Shmooni while her sons are Habroun, Hebsoun, Bakhous, Adai, Tarsai, Maqbai and Yawnothon. Their teacher was name Eleazar and was martyred along with them.

The three Ethiopian books of Meqabyan (canonical in the Ethiopian Orthodox Church, but distinct works from the other four books of Maccabees) refer to an unrelated group of "Maccabean Martyrs", five brothers including 'Abya, Seela, and Fentos, sons of a Benjamite named Maccabeus, who were captured and martyred for leading a guerrilla war against Antiochus Epiphanes.

Various mystery plays in the Middle Ages portrayed the Maccabean martyrs, and depictions of their martyrdom possibly gave rise to the term "macabre", perhaps derived from the Latin Machabaeorum.

== See also ==
- List of names for the Biblical nameless
- Felicitas of Rome
- Symphorosa
