= Moses Hadas =

American classical philologist (1900–1966)

Moses Hadas (June 25, 1900, Atlanta, Georgia – August 17, 1966) was an American teacher, a classical scholar, and a translator of numerous works from Greek, Hebrew, Latin, and German.

== Life ==
Raised in Atlanta in a Yiddish-speaking Orthodox Jewish household, his early studies included rabbinical training. He earned a rabbinical degree (1926) from the Jewish Theological Seminary of America, NY and earned his MA (1925) and PhD (1930) in classics at Columbia University, NY. He was fluent in Yiddish, German, ancient Hebrew, ancient Greek, Latin, French, and Italian, and well-versed in other languages.

His most productive years were spent at Columbia University, where he was a colleague of Jacques Barzun and Lionel Trilling. There he bucked the prevailing classical methods of the day—textual criticism and grammar—presenting classics, even in translation, as worthy of study as literary works in their own right.

He embraced television as a tool for education, becoming a telelecturer and a pundit on broadcast television. He also recorded classical works on phonograph and tape. Early in 1966, Hadas delivered four lectures on Hebraism and Hellenism at the 92nd St Y in New York City.

Moses Hadas had four children, Jane, David, Elizabeth and Rachel Hadas. With his first wife, he had a son David Hadas (1931–2004), a professor of English and Religious Studies at Washington University; and Jane Streusand.

Hadas is credited with two celebrated witticisms:

- "This book fills a much-needed gap."

- "Thank you for sending me a copy of your book. I'll waste no time reading it."

== Selected works ==
- Sextus Pompey. 1930
- Book of delight, by Joseph ben Meir Zabara; translated by Moses Hadas; with an introduction by Merriam Sherwood. 1932
- History of Greek literature. 1950
- History of Latin literature. 1952.
- Greek poets. 1953
- Ancilla to classical reading. 1954
- Oedipus. translated with an introd. by Moses Hadas. 1955
- History of Rome, from its origins to 529 A.D., as told by the Roman historians. 1956
- Thyestes. Translated, with an introduction by Moses Hadas. 1957
- Stoic philosophy of Seneca; essays and letters of Seneca.. 1958
- Hellenistic culture: fusion and diffusion. 1959
- Humanism: the Greek ideal and its survival. 1960
- Essential works of Stoicism. 1961
- Old wine, new bottles; a humanist teacher at work. 1962
- Gibbon's The Decline and Fall of the Roman Empire, Modern abridgment, 1962
- Hellenistic literature. 1963
- Style the repository. 1965
- Heroes and gods; spiritual biographies in antiquity, by Moses Hadas and Morton Smith. 1965
- Introduction to classical drama. Foreword by Alvin C. Eurich. 1966
- Living tradition. 1967
- Solomon Maimon, an autobiography / edited and with a preface by Moses Hadas. 1975

=== Discography ===
During the fifties, Hadas recorded several albums of Latin and Greek works on Folkways Records.

- The Story of Virgil's Aeneid: Introduction and Readings in Latin (and English) by Professor Moses Hadas (1955)
- The Latin Language: Introduction and Reading in Latin (and English) by Professor Moses Hadas of Columbia University (1955)
- Plato on the Death of Socrates: Introduction with Readings from the Apology and the Phaedo in Greek & in English trans. (1956)
- Caesar: Readings in Latin and English by Professor Moses Hadas (1956)
- Cicero: Commentary and Readings in Latin and English by Moses Hadas (1956)
- Longus - Daphnis and Chloe: Read by Moses Hadas from His Translation (1958)
