= 2 Maccabees =

Deuterocanonical book chronicling the Maccabean Revolt

2 Maccabees, (Note: Greek: Μακκαβαίων Β´, romanized: Makkabaíōn 2) also known as the Second Book of Maccabees, Second Maccabees, and abbreviated as 2 Macc., is a deuterocanonical book which recounts the persecution of Jews under King Antiochus IV Epiphanes and the Maccabean Revolt against him. It concludes with the defeat of the Seleucid Empire general Nicanor in 161 BC by Judas Maccabeus, the leader of the Maccabees.

2 Maccabees was originally written in Koine Greek by an unknown diaspora Jew living in Hellenistic Egypt. It was likely written some time between 150 and 100 BC. Together with the book 1 Maccabees, it is one of the most important sources on the Maccabean Revolt. The work is not a sequel to 1 Maccabees but rather its own independent rendition of the historical events of the Maccabean Revolt. It both starts and ends its history earlier than 1 Maccabees, beginning with an incident with the Seleucid official Heliodorus attempting to tax the Second Temple in 178 BC, and ending with the Battle of Adasa in 161 BC. Some scholars believe the book to be influenced by the Pharisaic tradition, with sections that include an endorsement of prayer for the dead and a resurrection of the dead.

The book, like the other Books of the Maccabees, was included in the Septuagint, a prominent Greek collection of Jewish scripture. It was not promptly translated to Hebrew or included in the Masoretic Hebrew canon, the Tanakh. While possibly read by Greek-speaking Jews in the two centuries after its creation, later Jews did not consider the work canonical or important. Early Christians did honor the work, and it was included as a deuterocanonical work of the Old Testament. Catholic, Eastern Orthodox, Oriental Orthodox, and Assyrian Church of the East Christians still consider the work deuterocanonical; Protestant Christians do not regard 2 Maccabees as canonical, although many include 2 Maccabees as part of the biblical apocrypha, noncanonical books useful for the purpose of edification.

== Authorship and composition date ==
The author of 2 Maccabees is not identified, but he claims to be abridging a 5-volume work by Jason of Cyrene. (Note: Since 2 Maccabees is largely an abridgment of another's work, the person who wrote 2 Maccabees is often referred to as "epitomist" or "epitomator" rather than "author".) This longer work is not preserved, and it is uncertain how much of the present text of 2 Maccabees is copied from Jason's work. The author wrote in Greek, as there is no particular evidence of an earlier Hebrew version. A few sections of the book, such as the Preface, Epilogue, and some reflections on morality are generally assumed to come from the author, not from Jason. Scholars disagree on both when Jason's work was written and when 2 Maccabees was written. Many scholars argue that Jason's work was likely published by a contemporary of the Maccabean Revolt, around 160–140 BCE, although all that is known for sure is that it was before 2 Maccabees. Scholars suggest 2 Maccabees was composed at some point from 150–100 BC. (Note: Scholarly estimates for the date of authorship include: Daniel R. Schwartz argues for an "early" date of publication of around 150–140 BC.; Stuckenbruck & Gurtner argue for between 150–120 BC.; Jonathan A. Goldstein argues for Jason of Cyrene's history published at sometime during the reign of Alexander Jannaeus (103 to 76 BC), and the abridged 2 Maccabees with the introductory letters by 76 BC.; John R. Bartlett argues for "almost anywhere in the last 150 years B.C.") It is generally considered that the work must have been written no later than the 70s BC, given that the author seems unaware that Pompey would defeat the Hasmonean kingdom and make Judea a Roman protectorate in 63 BC. The work was possibly modified some after creation, but reached its final form in the Septuagint, the Greek Jewish scriptures. The Septuagint version also gave the work its title of "2 Maccabees" to distinguish it from the other books of the Maccabees in it; the original title of the work, if any, is unknown.

The author appears to be an Egyptian Jew, possibly writing from the capital in Alexandria, addressing other diaspora Jews. (Note: Although the scholarly consensus is not entirely unanimous; Sylvie Honigman argues it was written in the Hasmonean kingdom rather than Egypt, and its portrayal of Judas's brother Simon Thassi was still positive overall. This view is usually discounted as 2 Maccabees is seen as downplaying Simon, along with various geographic mistakes that suggest a diaspora author.) The Greek style of the writer is educated and erudite, and he is familiar with the forms of rhetoric and argument of the era. The beginning of the book includes two letters sent by Jews in Jerusalem to Jews of the diaspora in Hellenistic Egypt encouraging the celebration of the feast day set up to honor the purification of the temple (Hanukkah). If the author of the book inserted these letters, the book would have to have been written after 188 SE (~124 BC), the date of the second letter. Some commentators hold that these letters were a later addition, while others consider them the basis for the work. (Note: Few scholars believe the introductory letters to be authentic, but some do suggest that they were compiled by the same epitomist who made the rest of the work. Some notable scholarly positions include: Benedikt Niese believed that the letters were integral to the work. Jonathan Goldstein considers the letters forgeries and later additions. Daniel R. Schwartz believes that they are a later addition, and further that the date was actually 148 SE, not 188 SE, and was a reference not to the date of the letter, but the date of the original cleansing of the Temple.)

== Contents ==
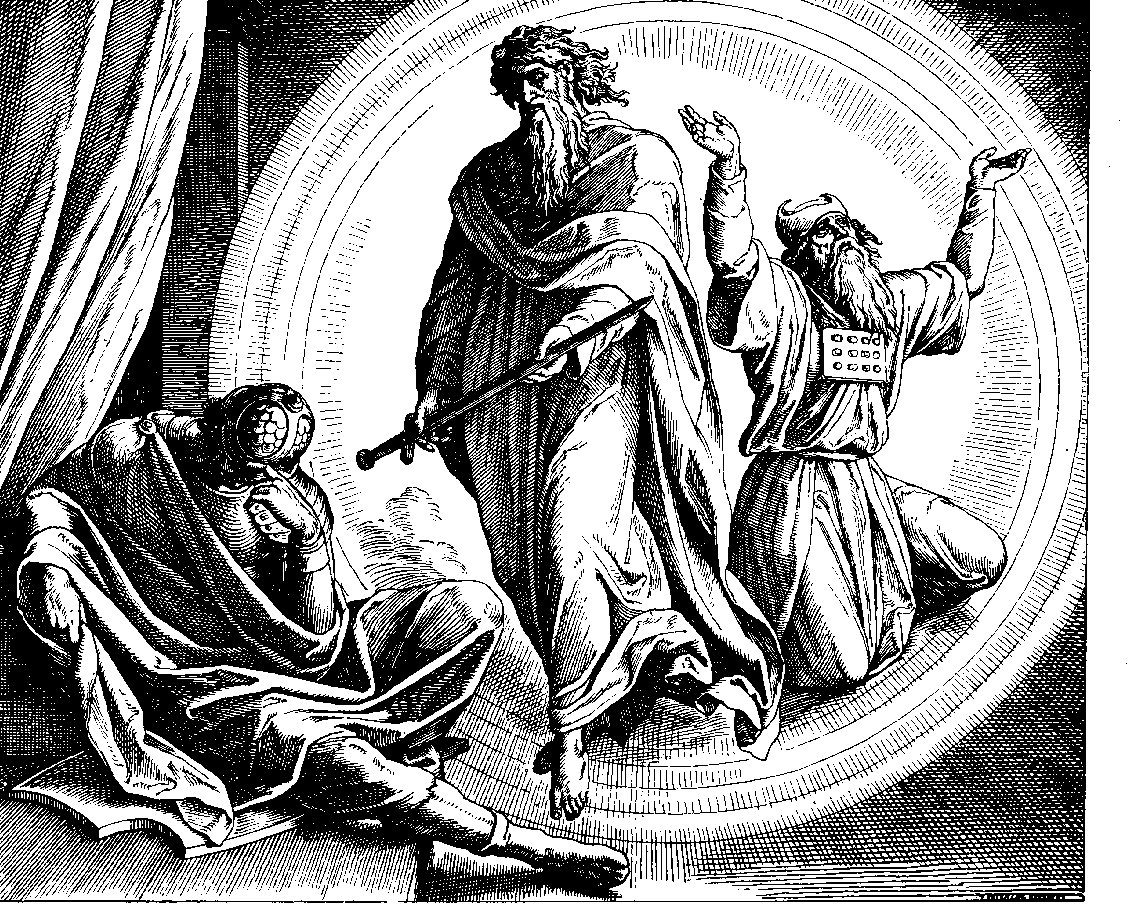
Vision of Judas Maccabee, 1860 woodcut by Julius Schnorr von Karolsfeld

=== Summary ===
2 Maccabees both starts and ends its history earlier than 1 Maccabees does, instead covering the period from the high priest Onias III and King Seleucus IV (180 BC) to the defeat of Nicanor in 161. The exact focus of the work is debated. All agree that the work has a moralistic tenor, showing the triumph of Judaism, the supremacy of God, and the just punishment of villains. Some see it as a paean to Judas Maccabeus personally, describing the background of the Revolt to write a biography praising him; some see its focus as the Second Temple, showing its gradual corruption by Antiochus IV and how it was saved and purified; others see the focus as the city of Jerusalem and how it was saved; and others disagree with all of the above, seeing it as written strictly for literary and entertainment value.

The author is interested in providing a theological interpretation of the events; in this book God's interventions direct the course of events, punishing the wicked and restoring the Temple to his people. Some events appear to be presented out of strict chronological order to make theological points, such as the occasional "flash forward" to a villain's later death. The numbers cited for sizes of armies may also appear exaggerated, though not all of the manuscripts of this book agree.

After the introductory stories of the controversies at the Temple and the persecutions of Antiochus IV, the story switches to its narrative of the Revolt itself. After the death of Antiochus IV Epiphanes, the Feast of the Dedication of the Temple is instituted. The Seleucid general Nicanor threatens the newly dedicated Temple. After his death, the festivities for the dedication are concluded. A special day is dedicated to commemorate the Jewish victory in the month of Adar, on the day before "Mordecai's Day" (Purim). The work explicitly urges diaspora Jews to celebrate both Hanukkah and Nicanor's Day.

=== Structure ===
2 Maccabees consists of 15 chapters.

- 1:1–2:18: Two letters to the Jews of Egypt.
- 2:19–32: Epitomist's preface.
- Chapter 3: Heliodorus attempts to tax the Temple of Jerusalem's treasury, but is repelled. (~178 BC)
- Chapter 4: High Priest Onias III of the Temple of Jerusalem is succeeded by his brother Jason; Jason is then succeeded by the corrupt Menelaus; Onias III is murdered. (~175–170 BC)
- Chapter 5: Jason attempts to overthrow Menelaus. King Antiochus IV Epiphanes returns from the second expedition of the Sixth Syrian War in Egypt, defeats Jason's supporters, sacks Jerusalem, loots the Temple treasury, and kills and enslaves local Jews as retribution for the perceived revolt. Jason is forced into exile. (168 BC)
- Chapter 6: The Temple is converted into a syncretic Greek-Jewish worship site. Antiochus IV issues decrees forbidding traditional Jewish practices, such as circumcision, keeping kosher, and keeping the Sabbath. Eleazar the scribe is tortured and killed after refusing to eat pork. (168–167 BC)
- Chapter 7: Martyrdom of the woman and her seven sons after torture by Antiochus IV.
- Chapter 8: Start of the Maccabean Revolt. Judas Maccabeus defeats Nicanor, Gorgias, and Ptolemy son of Dorymenes at the Battle of Emmaus. (~166–165 BC)
- 9:1–10:9: Antiochus IV is stricken with disease by God. He belatedly repents and writes a letter attempting to make peace before dying in Persia. Judas conquers Jerusalem, cleanses the Temple, and establishes the festival of Hanukkah. (~164 BC)
- 10:10–38: Lysias becomes regent. Governor Ptolemy Macron attempts to cement peace with the Jews, but is undermined by anti-Jewish nobles and commits suicide. The Maccabees campaign in outlying regions against Timothy of Ammon and others. (~163 BC)
- Chapter 11: Lysias leads a military expedition to Judea. Judas defeats him at the Battle of Beth Zur. Four documents detailing negotiations with Lysias and the Roman Republic. (~160s BC)
- Chapter 12: More accounts of the campaigns in outlying regions against Timothy, Gorgias, and others. (~163 BC)
- Chapter 13: Lysias orders the execution of unpopular High Priest Menelaus. Judas harries Lysias's expedition with minor victories. Lysias leaves and returns to the capital of Antioch to face the usurper Philip. (~163–162 BC, likely near in time to the Battle of Beth Zechariah described in 1 Maccabees)
- 14:1–15:36: Demetrius I becomes King. Alcimus, who had replaced Menelaus as High Priest, is affirmed by Demetrius I. Nicanor is appointed governor of Judea. Nicanor and Judas enter negotiations for peace, but are subverted by Alcimus, who complains to the king; Judas's arrest is ordered. Nicanor threatens to destroy the Temple. In a dream vision, Onias III and the prophet Jeremiah give Judas a divine golden sword. At the Battle of Adasa, Judas defeats and kills Nicanor, preserving the sanctity of the Temple. The Day of Nicanor festival is established. (~161 BC)
- 15:37–39: Epitomist's epilogue.

== Canonicity and theology ==
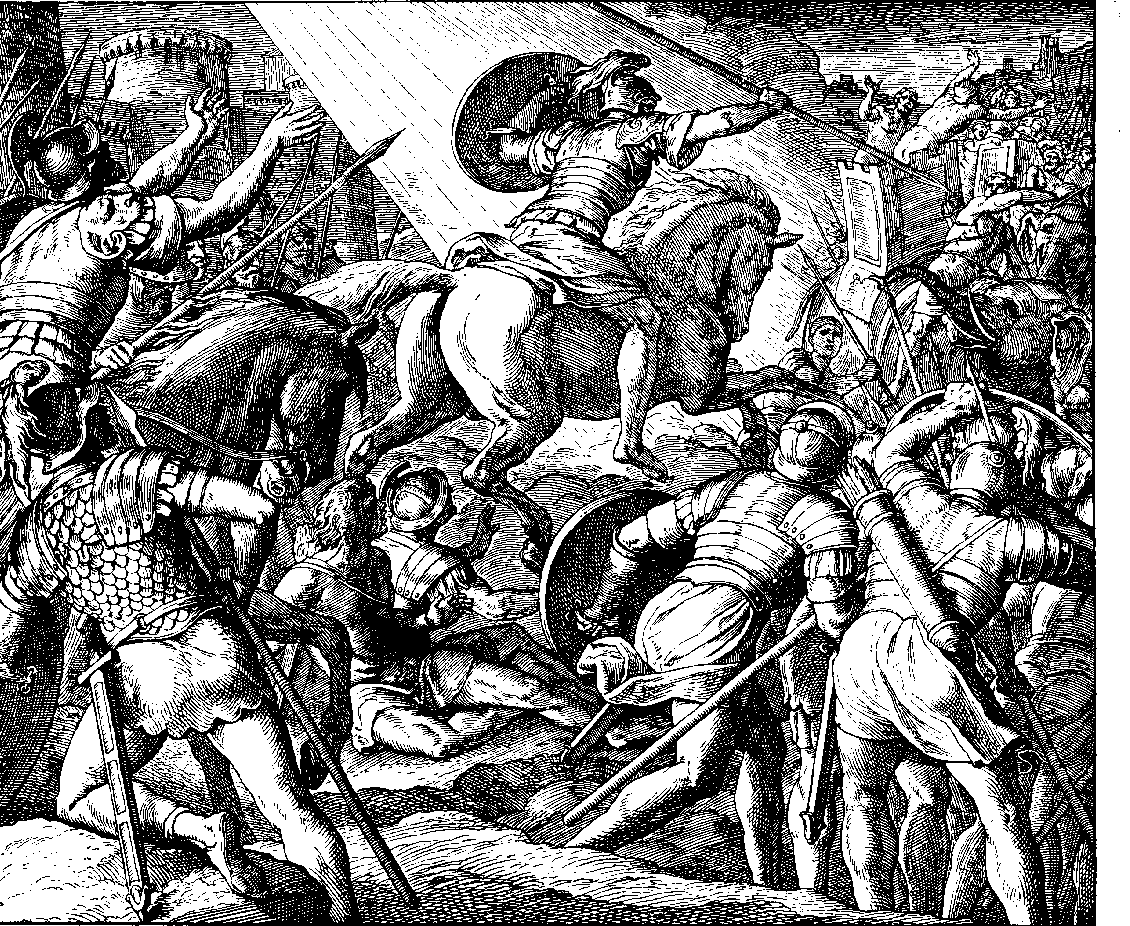
Rider on the Horse with golden armor, who appears in Chapter 3 to fight Heliodorus, from Die Bibel in Bildern

The Catholic Church, Eastern Orthodox Church, Oriental Orthodox Churches, and the Assyrian Church of the East regard 2 Maccabees as canonical. Jews and Protestants do not.

=== Hellenistic Judaism ===
Greek-speaking Jews were the original audience addressed by the work. Both 1 and 2 Maccabees appear in some Septuagint manuscripts. Unlike most works in the Septuagint, which were Greek translations of Hebrew originals, 2 Maccabees was a Greek work originally. While not a problem for Greek-speaking Hellenistic Jews nor Christians (whose scriptures were written in Greek), other Jews who kept to the Hebrew version of the Hebrew Bible never included it. Hellenistic Judaism slowly waned as many of its adherents either converted to Christianity or switched to other languages, and 2 Maccabees thus did not become part of the Jewish canon. Josephus, the most famous Jewish writer of the first century whose work was preserved, does not appear to have read 2 Maccabees, for example; neither does Philo of Alexandria. Neither book of the Maccabees was found among the Dead Sea Scrolls of the Essenes, a Jewish sect hostile to the Hasmoneans and their memory. Various works such as Seder Olam Rabbah (a 2nd-century AD midrash) indicate that the age of prophecy ended with Alexander the Great, and 2 Maccabees, a work clearly written later, thus could not be prophetic.

Traditionally, it was hypothesized that the author of 2 Maccabees might have been influenced by the Pharasaic tradition. The Pharisees emphasized adherence to Jewish law and disputed with the rulers of the Hasmonean kingdom. They criticized how the Hasmoneans took a dual role of both Chief Priest and King and demanded that they cede one of the titles (usually the kingship, which was expected to be held by one of the family lineage of King David).

Hasmonean King Alexander Jannaeus is recorded as organizing a massacre of his political opponents, and many went into exile. The theory goes that 2 Maccabees praises Judas for saving the Temple but excludes mention of how his brothers and extended family later took the throne, which might have been written by a Pharisee from Judea writing in Egyptian exile. The work's emphasis on adherence to the Law even on pain of martyrdom, keeping Shabbat, and the promise of a future resurrection seems to fit within Pharisaic theology and praxis. Still, other scholars disagree that the author shows any signs of such inclinations, and belief in a future resurrection of the dead was not limited to only Pharisees; scholars since the 1980s have tended to be skeptical of the proposed connection.

The theology of the work is an update to the "Deuteronomist" history seen in older Jewish works. The classical Deuteronomist view had been that when Israel is faithful and upholds the covenant, the Jews prosper; when Israel neglects the covenant, God withdraws his favor, and Israel suffers. The persecution of Antiochus IV stood in direct contradiction to this tradition: the most faithful Jews were the ones who suffered the most. At the same time, those who abandoned Jewish practices became wealthy and powerful. The author of 2 Maccabees attempts to make sense of this in several ways: he explains that the suffering was a swift and merciful corrective to set the Jews back on the right path. While God had revoked his protection of the Temple in anger at the impious High Priests, his wrath turned to mercy upon seeing the suffering of the martyrs. The work also takes pains to ensure that some sin or error is at fault when setbacks occur. For those truly blameless, such as the martyrs, the author invokes life after death: that post-mortem rewards and punishments would accomplish what might have been lacking in the mortal world. These references to the resurrection of the dead despite suffering and torture were part of a new current in Judaism also seen in the Book of Daniel, a work the authors of 2 Maccabees were likely familiar with. This would prove especially influential among Roman-era Jews who converted to Christianity.

=== Christianity in the era of the Roman Empire ===
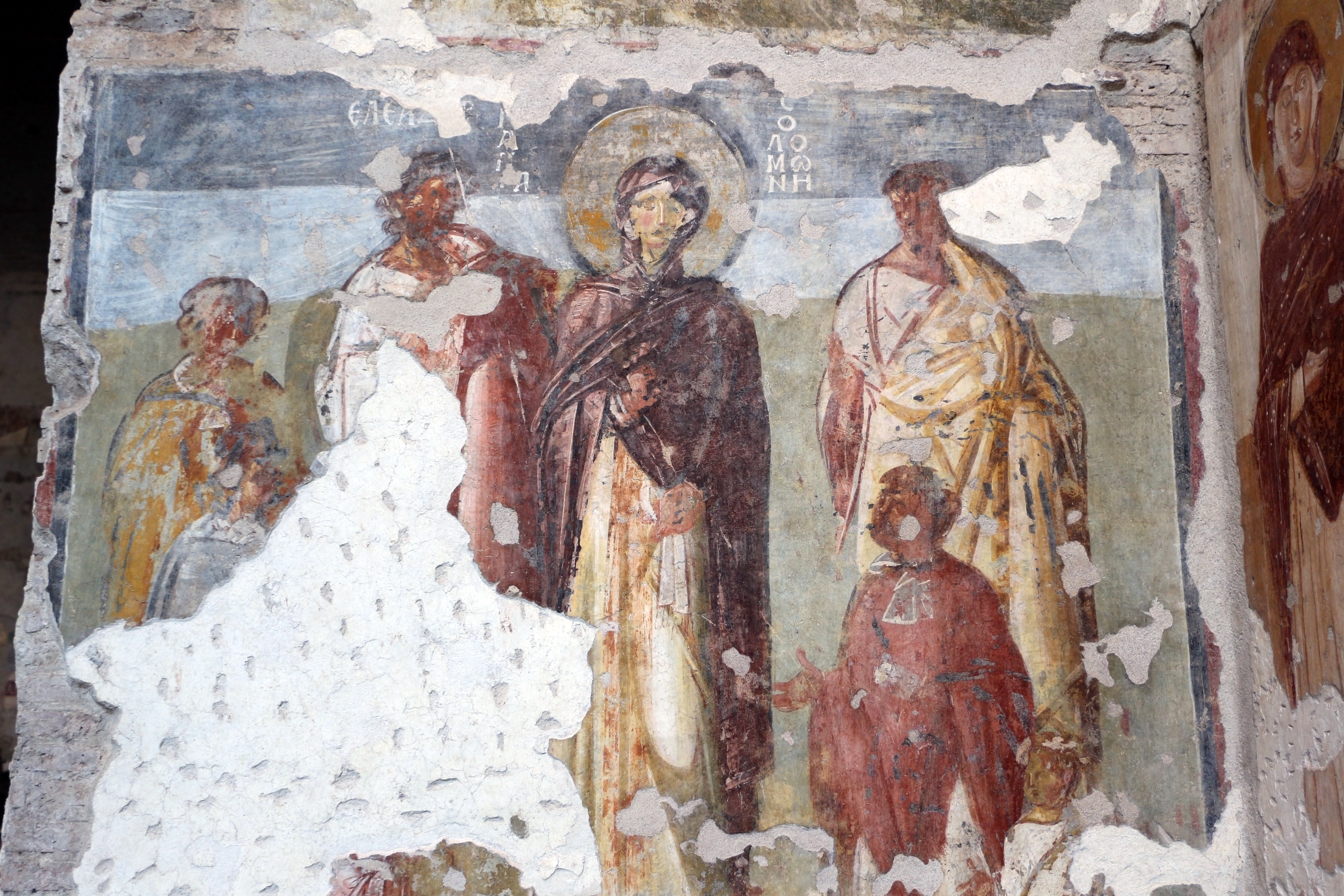
A Byzantine-style fresco at the Santa Maria Antiqua church in Rome, likely painted around 650 AD. It depicts the woman and her seven sons (here named Solomne) and Eleazar, their teacher. The story of their martyrdom is the most famous part of 2 Maccabees.

In the early Christian tradition, the Septuagint was used as the basis for the Christian Old Testament. The inclusion of 2 Maccabees in some copies of the Septuagint saw it as a part of various early canon lists and manuscripts, albeit sometimes as part of an appendix. Pope Damasus I's Council of Rome in 382, if the 6th-century Gelasian Decree is correctly associated with it, issued a biblical canon that included both 1 and 2 Maccabees, but neither 3 nor 4.

Pope Innocent I (405 AD), the Synod of Hippo (393 AD), the Council of Carthage (397 AD), the Council of Carthage (419 AD), and the Apostolic Canons all seemed to think that 2 Maccabees was canonical, either by explicitly saying so or citing it as scripture. Jerome and Augustine of Hippo (c. 397 AD) had seemingly inconsistent positions: they directly excluded 2 Maccabees from canon, but did say that the book was useful; yet in other works, both cited 2 Maccabees as if it were scripture, or listed it among scriptural works.

Theologically, the major aspects of 2 Maccabees that resonated with Roman-era Christians and medieval Christians were its stories of martyrology and the resurrection of the dead in its stories of Eleazar and the woman with seven sons. Christians made sermons and comparisons of Christian martyrs to the Maccabean martyrs, along with the hope of an eventual salvation; Eusebius compared the persecuted Christians of Lyon to the Maccabean martyrs, for example. Several churches were dedicated to the "Maccabean martyrs", and they are among the few pre-Christian figures to appear on the calendar of saints' days. A cult to the Maccabean martyrs flourished in Antioch, the former capital of the Seleucids; Augustine of Hippo found it ironic and fitting that the city that named Antiochus IV now revered those he persecuted. The one awkward aspect was that the martyrs had died upholding Jewish Law in an era when many Christians felt that the Law of Moses was not merely obsolete, but actively harmful. Christian authors generally downplayed the Jewishness of the martyrs, treating them as proto-Christians instead.

=== Controversy in the Reformation era ===
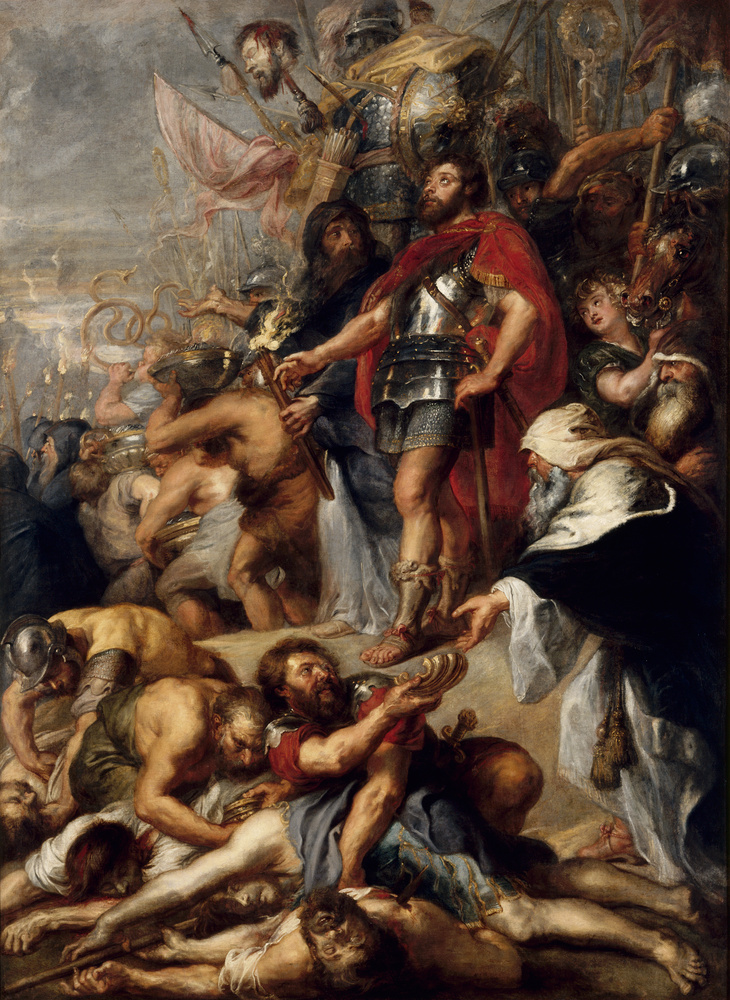
The Triumph of Judas Maccabeus, a 1630s work by Peter Paul Rubens. The scene depicted is from 2 Maccabees: After a campaign in Idumea, some Jews fell against Gorgias's forces. According to the epitomist, these Jews died because they had idols on them; Judas makes a sin offering in recompense. This offering would become cited in the 1400s and 1500s as a defense of Catholic doctrine on purgatory and indulgences.

2 Maccabees was in a position of being an official part of the canon, but as a deuterocanonical work and thus subtly lesser than the older scriptures during the early 1500s. Josse van Clichtove, in his work The Veneration of Saints, cited 2 Maccabees as support for the idea of dead saints interceding for the salvation of the living; in Chapter 15, during a dream vision, both the earlier high priest Onias III and the prophet Jeremiah are said to pray for whole of the people. He also cited 2 Maccabees as support for prayers for the dead, the reverse case of the living praying for the salvation of souls suffering in purgatory.

The book became controversial due to opposition from Martin Luther and other reformers during the Protestant Reformation of the 1500s. Luther had a very high opinion of scripture, but precisely because of this, he wished for the canon to be strict. He would eventually demote the deuterocanonical works to "apocrypha"; still useful to read and part of the 1534 version of the Luther Bible, but set aside in their own separate section and not accepted as a sound basis for Christian doctrine. Luther had several complaints. One was that it was an abridgment of another work, rather than a single divinely inspired author. Another was a general preference for using the Hebrew Bible as the basis for the Old Testament, rather than the Latin Vulgate or the Greek Septuagint. Another was with the prevailing Catholic interpretation and use of one story: that of Judas making a "sin offering" of silver after some of his troops were slain and found with idols, so that the dead might be delivered from their sin. This passage was used as an example of the efficacy of monetary indulgences paid to the Catholic Church to free souls from purgatory by some Catholic authors of the period. Luther disagreed with both indulgences and the concept of purgatory, and in his 1530 work Disavowl of Purgatory, he denied that 2 Maccabees was a valid source to cite. Luther was reported as having said: "I am so great an enemy to the second book of the Maccabees, and to Esther, that I wish they had not come to us at all, for they have too many heathen unnaturalities." The reformer Jean Calvin agreed with Luther's criticism of 2 Maccabees, and added his own criticism as well. Calvin propounded predestination, the doctrine that God has chosen the elect, and nothing can change this. Thus, the arguments from Clichtove and other Catholics that cited 2 Maccabees for the doctrine of the intercession of saints was suspect to him: for Calvin, salvation was strictly God's choice, and not a matter that dead saints could intervene on. Another issue Calvin and other Protestants raised was the self-effacing epilogue to 2 Maccabees, which Calvin took as an admission from the epitomist that he was not divinely inspired.

In response to this, the Catholic Church went in the opposite direction. While earlier Church Fathers had considered the deuterocanonical books useful but lesser than the main scriptures, the Catholic Church now affirmed that 2 Maccabees (and other deuterocanonical works) were in fact fully reliable as scripture at the Council of Trent in 1546.

=== Modern status ===
2 Maccabees is still used to endorse the doctrine of resurrection of the dead, intercession of saints, and prayers for the dead to be released from purgatory in the Catholic tradition. The Latin Church Lectionary makes use of texts from 2 Maccabees 6 and 7, along with texts from 1 Maccabees 1 to 6, in the weekday readings for the 33rd week in Ordinary Time, in year 1 of the two-year cycle of readings, always in November, and as one of the options available for readings during a Mass for the Dead.

The Eastern Orthodox and Oriental Orthodox Churches consider the book canonical. As in antiquity, the most notable section remains the martyrs, who are celebrated as saints by a variety of feast days. They are especially honored in Syriac Christianity, perhaps due to suffering persecution themselves; the mother of seven sons is known as Marth Shmouni in that tradition.

In the Protestant tradition, the book is regarded non-canonical, though it is traditionally included in the intertestamental Apocrypha section of the Bible (especially those used by Lutherans and Anglicans). As with the Lutheran Churches, Article VI of the Thirty-nine Articles of the Church of England and the wider Anglican Communion defines 2 Maccabees as useful but not the basis of doctrine. Scripture readings from the Apocrypha are included in the lectionaries of the Lutheran Churches and Anglican Communion.

The texts regarding the martyrdoms under Antiochus IV in 2 Maccabees are held in high esteem by the Anabaptists, who faced persecution in their history.

== Literary influence ==
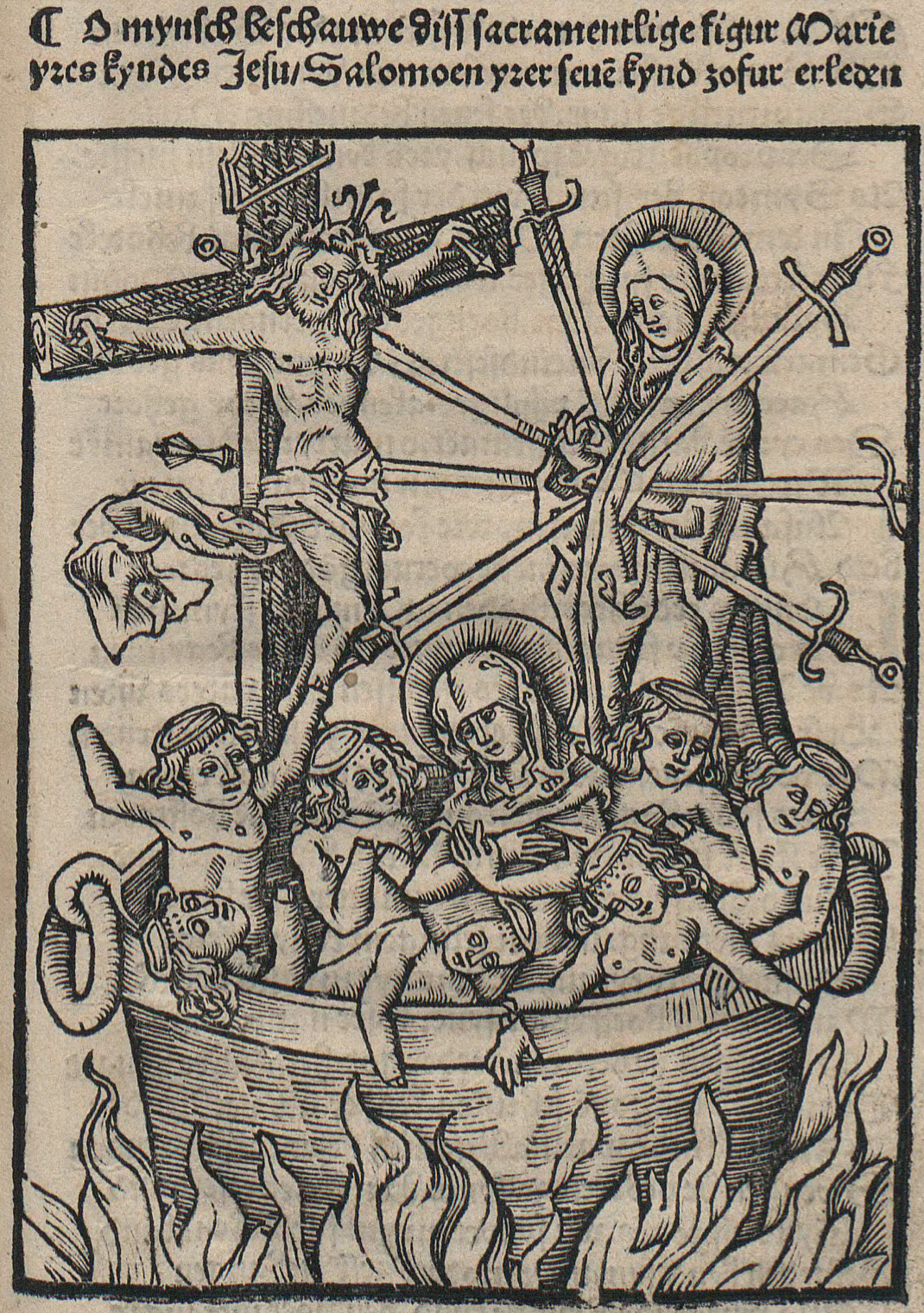
A 1517 German depiction of the crucified Jesus, the mother, and her seven sons in the boiling cauldron.

The most influential part of 2 Maccabees was its stories of the martyrdom of Eleazar and the woman with seven sons; various works expanded the story to add more details such as the woman's name (variously called Hannah, Miriam, Shmouni, and other names) and their story. A prominent early example is the book of 4 Maccabees, written by a 1st-century Jewish author who used 2 Maccabees as a direct source (as well as the Book of Daniel). 4 Maccabees discusses in detail the martyrdoms described in 2 Maccabees, but provides a different interpretation of them. While 2 Maccabees attempts to arouse sympathy and emotions (pathos), 4 Maccabees was written by someone schooled in Stoic philosophy. As such, in its depiction, the martyred woman and Eleazar calmly discuss matters with their oppressors; they use reason and intellectual argument to stay calm and defy Antiochus IV. 4 Maccabees takes the idea of the resurrection of the dead even more directly than 2 Maccabees and Daniel: if God will revive those who suffer for obeying God's law, then it makes perfect sense to obey the greater ruler rather than the lesser ruler.

To a lesser degree, the book 3 Maccabees evinces familiarity with 2 Maccabees; while the setting is different (it is set fifty years before the Maccabean Revolt in Egypt, not Judea), Eleazar the scribe appears in it, and the depictions of turmoil and suffering among Egyptian Jews are influenced by 2 Maccabees. The Christian Epistle to the Hebrews possibly makes a reference to 2 Maccabees as well, or has similar knowledge of the Maccabean martyr tradition.

A later work that directly expanded 2 Maccabees was the Yosippon of the 10th century, which includes a paraphrase of parts of the Latin translation of 2 Maccabees. Among Jews, there had been practically no interest in 2 Maccabees itself for a millennium; the Yosippon was a rare exception of medieval Jews rediscovering the work. Much like in Christian works, the story of the mother and her seven sons was the most retold and influential.

== Reliability as history ==
2 Maccabees has traditionally been considered a somewhat lesser source on the history of the Maccabean Revolt than 1 Maccabees by secular historians, especially in the 19th century. This is for a number of reasons: it wears its religious moralizing openly; it skips around in time and place at parts, rather than the chronological approach in 1 Maccabees; and it includes a number of implausible claims directly in contention with 1 Maccabees. In general, most scholars continue to agree that 1 Maccabees is a superior source on the military history of the revolt: it was written by a Judean who names and describes locations accurately compared to the occasional geographic blunders of 2 Maccabees written by an Egyptian, includes far more details on maneuvers and tactics than the simple depictions of battle in 2 Maccabees, and its figures for elements such as troop counts and casualties are considered more reliable than the wildly inflated numbers in 2 Maccabees. (For example, 2 Maccabees implausibly claims that there were 35,000 Syrian casualties at the Battle of Adasa, a number likely far larger than the entire Seleucid force.) 2 Maccabees was also written in a "pathetic" in the sense of pathos style, appealing to emotions and sentiment. Skeptical historians considered this a sign that the epitomist was not interested in historical accuracy much, but merely telling a good story.

In the 20th century, there was a renewed interest in rehabilitating 2 Maccabees as a source on par with 1 Maccabees by scholars. In particular, there was a growing recognition that a politically slanted history, as 1 Maccabees is, could be just as biased and unreliable as the religiously slanted history that 2 Maccabees is. A deeply devout observer could still be describing true events, albeit with a religious interpretation of them. By the 1930s, historians generally came to the conclusion that the historical documents present in 2 Maccabees – while seemingly out of chronological order – were likely legitimate and matched what would be expected of such Seleucid negotiations. Archaeological evidence supported many of the references made to Seleucid leadership, causing historians to think that Jason and the epitomist must have had better knowledge of internal Seleucid affairs than the author of 1 Maccabees. As an example, 2 Maccabees appears to be more reliable and honest on the date of the death of Antiochus IV. Archaeological evidence supports the claim in 2 Maccabees he died before the cleansing of the Temple, while 1 Maccabees moves his death later to hide the fact that Lysias abandoned his campaign in Judea not due to the efforts of the Maccabees at the Battle of Beth Zur, but rather to respond to political turmoil resulting from Antiochus's death. In 2 Maccabees, it is written that Antiochus's decrees were targeted against Judea and Samaria, which historians find more likely than the claim in 1 Maccabees that he demanded religious standardization across the entire empire.

Even to the extent that 2 Maccabees is still distrusted as history to a degree, the fact that it is a genuinely independent source is considered invaluable to historians. Many events in the Hellenistic and Roman periods have only passing mentions that they occurred; those that do have a detailed source often only have a single such detailed source, leaving it difficult to determine that author's biases or errors. For example, the Great Revolt against the Romans in 64–73 AD is only closely recorded by Josephus's The Jewish War. The Maccabean Revolt having two independent detailed contemporary histories is a rarity.

== Manuscripts ==
Early manuscripts of the Septuagint were not uniform in their lists of books. 2 Maccabees is found in the 5th-century Codex Alexandrinus, which includes all of 1, 2, 3, and 4 Maccabees, as well as the 8th-century Codex Venetus. 2 Maccabees is missing from the Codex Vaticanus (which lacks any of the books of Maccabees) and the Codex Sinaiticus (which includes 1 and 4 Maccabees, but neither 2 nor 3 Maccabees). Additionally, other ancient fragments have been found, albeit with some attributed to Lucian of Antioch who is considered to have "improved" some of his renditions with unknown other material, leading to variant readings. Pre-modern Latin, Syriac, and Armenian translations exist, as well as a fragment in Akhmimic Coptic, but they mostly match the Greek, or the Lucianic renditions of the Greek in the case of the Syriac versions. Robert Hanhart created a critical edition of the Greek text in 1959 with a second edition published in 1976.

== Bibliography ==
- Bar-Kochva, Bezalel (1989). Judas Maccabaeus: The Jewish Struggle Against the Seleucids. Cambridge University Press. ISBN 0521323525.
- Bartlett, John R. (1973). The First and Second Books of the Maccabees. Cambridge: Cambridge University Press.
- Doran, Robert (2012). Attridge, Harold W. (ed.). 2 Maccabees: A Critical Commentary. Hermeneia. Minneapolis: Augsburg Fortress Press. ISBN 9780800660505.
- Harrington, Daniel J. (2009) [1988]. The Maccabean Revolt: Anatomy of a Biblical Revolution. Eugene, Oregon: Wipf and Stock. ISBN 978-1-60899-113-6.
- Goldstein, Jonathan A. (1983). II Maccabees: A New Translation with Introduction and Commentary. The Anchor Bible Series. Vol. 41A. Garden City, NY: Doubleday. ISBN 0-385-04864-5.
- Schwartz, Daniel R. (2008). 2 Maccabees. Commentaries on Early Jewish Literature. Berlin: Walter De Gruyter. ISBN 978-3-11-019118-9.
- Harrington, Daniel J. (2012). New Collegeville Bible Commentary: First and Second Maccabees. Collegeville Township, Minnesota: Liturgical Press. ISBN 978-0814628461.

=== Further reading ===
- Borchardt, Francis. 2016. "Reading Aid: 2 Maccabees and the History of Jason of Cyrene Reconsidered." Journal for the Study of Judaism 47, no. 1: 71–87.
- Coetzer, Eugene. 2016. "Heroes and Villains in 2 Maccabees 8:1–36: A Rhetorical Analysis." Old Testament Essays: 419–33.
- Doran, Robert. 1981. Temple Propaganda: The Purpose and Character of 2 Maccabees. Catholic Biblical Quarterly Monograph Series 12. Washington, DC: Catholic Biblical Association.
- Habicht, C. 1976. "Royal Documents in II Maccabees." Harvard Studies in Classical Philology 80: 1–18.
- Janowitz, Naomi. 2017. The Family Romance of Martyrdom In Second Maccabees. New York: Routledge.
- Kosmin, P. 2016. "Indigenous Revolts in 2 Maccabees: The Persian Version." Classical Philology 111, no. 1: 32–53.
- Stewart, Tyler A. 2017. "Jewish Paideia: Greek Education in the Letter of Aristeas and 2 Maccabees." Journal for the Study of Judaism 48, no. 2: 182–202.
- Trotter, Jonathan R. 2017. "2 Maccabees 10:1–8: Who Wrote It and Where Does It Belong?" Journal of Biblical Literature 136, no. 1: 117–30.

2 Maccabees Deuterocanon / Apocrypha
Preceded by 1 Maccabees	Catholic and Orthodox; Books of the Bible	Succeeded by 3 Maccabees in the Eastern Orthodox OT; Job in the Current Roman Catholic OT; Matthew in the Older Roman Catholic OT
