= Duyuk =

Duyuk is an Arabic placename.

It may refer to:

- Dok, an ancient fortress on Mount Quruntul west of Jericho in the West Bank
- 'Ein ad-Duyuk al-Foqa, a village at the northeast base of Quruntul
- 'Ein ad-Duyuk at-Tahta, a village and refugee camp at the southwest base of Quruntul
