= Ein ad-Duyuk al-Foqa =

- Municipality type D (Village council)

Arabic transcription(s)
  - Arabic: عين الديوك الفوقا
- Location of Ein ad-Duyuk at-Foqa within Palestine
- Coordinates: 31°53′22″N 35°25′30″E
- Palestine grid: 190/143
- State: State of Palestine
- Governorate: Jericho

Government
  - Type: Village council

Population (2017)
  - Total: 885

Ein ad-Duyuk al-Foqa (Arabic: عين الديوك الفوقا), also called Duyuk, is a Palestinian village in the Jericho Governorate in the eastern West Bank situated in the Jordan Valley, located 3 kilometers (1.9 mi) northwest of Jericho. According to the Palestinian Central Bureau of Statistics, Ein ad-Duyuk al-Foqa had a population of 885 inhabitants in 2017. In 1997, refugees constituted 27.9% of the population. The primary health care for the village is through contributions from the Ministry of Health and Medical Relief Committee.

== History ==
=== Antiquity ===
Under the Seleucid Empire, the peak of nearby Jebel Quruntul was fortified and garrisoned to control Jericho and the roads leading through the mountains from it to Jerusalem. The original Hebrew name is not preserved except in the Greek transcriptions of 1 Maccabees and Josephus, which call it Dok and Dagon. It was the scene of Simon Maccabeus's assassination by his son-in-law Ptolemy. The later lavra monastery beside the Grotto of the Temptation also had a name transcribed into Greek as Douka.

=== Ottoman era ===
It was noted as mazra’a (=cultivated land) near Riha in the 945 AH/1538-1539 CE Ottoman tax records, and as a mazra’a near An-Nuway'imah in the 1005 AH/1596-1597 CE tax records.

In 1838 Edward Robinson noted the "large and beautiful fountain or rather fountains" at Duk.

In 1883, the PEF's Survey of Western Palestine noted at Ain ed Duk: "Near this spring a tomb was examined in the side of the hill. It is a chamber with 21 kokim in two tiers. There are other caves near it, and broken sarcophagi. The one excavated measures 16 feet by 17 feet. The lower tier contains three kokim at the back, and 4 each side. The upper tier has only three on the left hand side. The kokim are 2 feet wide, 6 feet 8 inches long, and 3 feet 4 inches high. Near the same place were found two shafts 3 feet long and 2 feet 8 inches diameter."

=== British Mandate era ===
In the 1922 census of Palestine conducted by the British Mandate authorities, ad-Duyuk, together with Al-Auja and Nweimeh had a population of 332; 322 Muslims and 10 Christians, where the Christians were 7 Orthodox, and 3 Syrian Catholic. In the 1931 census Duyuk had a population of 291 Muslims, in 66 houses.

In the 1945 statistics, Duyuk's population was 730 Muslims and it had jurisdiction over 21,332 dunams of land. Of this, 399 dunams were for citrus and bananas, 2,050 dunams were for plantations and irrigable land, 1,171 for cereals, while a total of 17,712 dunams were non-cultivable areas.

=== Jordanian era ===
In the wake of the 1948 Arab–Israeli War, and after the 1949 Armistice Agreements, Duyuk came under Jordanian rule.

=== Post-1967 ===
Since the Six-Day War in 1967, Duyuk has been under Israeli occupation.

In 1994, Ein ad-Duyuk al-Foqa and An Nuwei'ma were constituted as a single local council. After the 1995 accords, 52.3% of the land of Ein ad-Duyuk al-Foqa is classified as Area A, the remaining 47.7% is Area C. On the morning of 14 December 2025, Israeli settlers reportedly attacked the community, injuring seven residents including children and a disabled man. The settlers entered the area and broke into multiple houses while families were inside, damaging windows and belongings in at least three homes and reportedly stealing equipment and personal items. Reports indicate that such attacks had intensified in the preceding two months, allegedly involving settlers from an outpost established in August 2024 near three others set up in the area since 2012. Residents have reported frequent raids and harassment by settlers from this outpost.

== See also ==
- 'Ein ad-Duyuk at-Tahta
- Dok, an ancient fortress on nearby Mount Quruntul

== Bibliography ==
- Barron, J.B., ed. (1923). Palestine: Report and General Abstracts of the Census of 1922. Government of Palestine.
- Conder, C.R.; Kitchener, H.H. (1883). The Survey of Western Palestine: Memoirs of the Topography, Orography, Hydrography, and Archaeology. Vol. 3. London: Committee of the Palestine Exploration Fund. (pp. 173, 209)
- Government of Palestine, Department of Statistics (1945). Village Statistics, April, 1945.
- Hadawi, S. (1970). Village Statistics of 1945: A Classification of Land and Area ownership in Palestine. Palestine Liberation Organization Research Center.
- Mills, E., ed. (1932). Census of Palestine 1931. Population of Villages, Towns and Administrative Areas. Jerusalem: Government of Palestine.
- Palmer, E.H. (1881). The Survey of Western Palestine: Arabic and English Name Lists Collected During the Survey by Lieutenants Conder and Kitchener, R. E. Transliterated and Explained by E.H. Palmer. Committee of the Palestine Exploration Fund.
- Robinson, E.; Smith, E. (1841). Biblical Researches in Palestine, Mount Sinai and Arabia Petraea: A Journal of Travels in the year 1838. Vol. 2. Boston: Crocker & Brewster.
- Toledano, E. (1984). "The Sanjaq of Jerusalem in the Sixteenth Century: Aspects of Topography and Population". Archivum Ottomanicum. 9: 279–319. Archived from the original on 2016-03-05.
