= Monastery of the Temptation =

Greek Orthodox monastery near Jericho, Palestine

- دير القرنطل
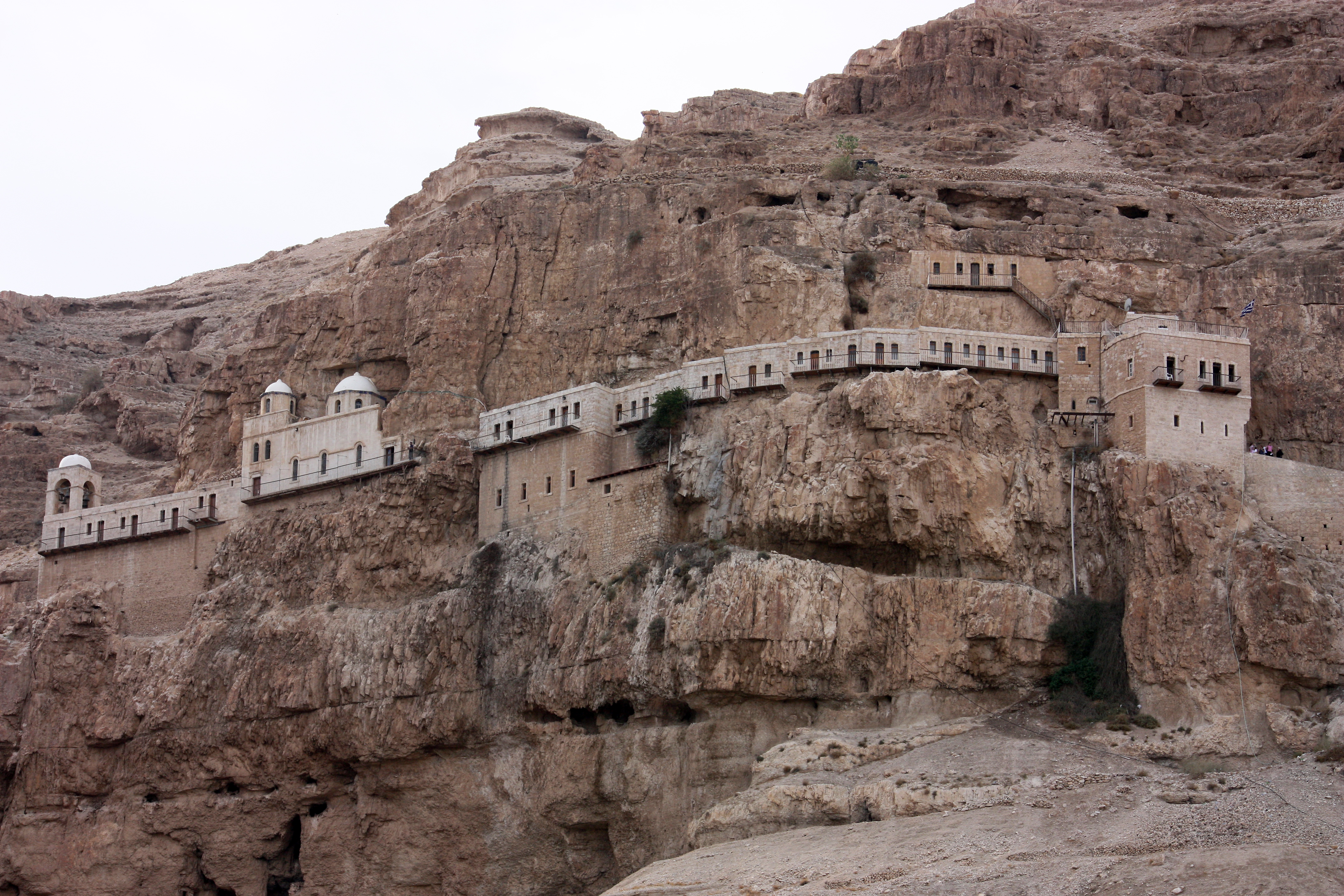
- The Monastery of the Temptation located on the cliffs overlooking Jericho.

Religion
- Affiliation: Greek Orthodox Church of Jerusalem

Location
- Location: Jericho Governorate, West Bank, Palestine
- Interactive map of Monastery of the Temptation
- Palestine grid: 1909/1422
- Coordinates: 31°52′29″N 35°25′56″E

The Monastery of the Temptation (Greek: Μοναστήρι του Πειρασμού, Monastḗri tou Peirasmoú; Arabic: دير القرنطل, Deir al-Qurunṭul; Hebrew: דיר אל-קרנטל) is a Greek Orthodox monastery located in Jericho, Palestine. It was built on the slopes of the Mount of Temptation 350 meters above sea level, situated along a cliff overlooking the city of Jericho and the Jordan Valley. Its most ancient structures date back to the 6th century, having been built above the cave traditionally said to be that where Jesus spent forty days and forty nights fasting and meditating while he was tempted by Satan.

It currently serves as a tourist attraction and its land is under the full jurisdiction of the Palestinian National Authority, while the monastery is owned and managed by the Greek Orthodox Patriarchate of Jerusalem.

== History ==
=== Hellenistic period ===
A fortress built by the Seleucids called "Doq" stood at the summit of the mountain. It was captured by the Hasmoneans and it was here that Simon Maccabaeus was murdered by his son-in-law Ptolemy.

=== Byzantine period ===
The earliest monastery was constructed by the Byzantines in the 6th century AD above the cave traditionally said to be that where Jesus spent forty days and forty nights fasting and meditating during the temptation of Satan, about three kilometers northwest of Jericho. The monastery receives its name from the mountain which the early Christians referred to as the "Mount of the Temptation". The Mount of Temptation was identified by Augusta Helena of Constantinople as one of the "holy sites" in her pilgrimage in 326 AD.

=== Early Muslim period ===
Palestine, including Jericho, was conquered by the Arabs under the Islamic Caliphate of Umar ibn al-Khattab in the 630s.

=== Crusader period ===
When the Crusaders conquered the area in 1099, they built two churches on the site: one in a cave halfway up the cliff and a second on the summit. They referred to the site as Mons Quarantana (compare with quarante in modern French and quaranta in modern Italian, both meaning forty, the number of days in the Gospel account of Jesus's fast).

=== Late Ottoman period ===
The land upon which the modern monastery was built was purchased by the Orthodox Church in 1874. In 1895, the monastery was constructed around a crude cave chapel that marks the stone where Jesus sat during his fast.

The Orthodox Church, along with its Palestinian Orthodox followers purchaser, originally attempted to build a church at the summit, but were unsuccessful; the unfinished walls of that church are located on a slope above the monastery.

=== Palestinian Authority ===
In 1998, a cable car was built from Jericho's Tell es-Sultan to the level of the monastery by an Austrian-Swiss company as a tourist attraction for the year 2000.

As of 2002, three Orthodox monks were dwelling in the monastery and were guiding visitors to the site.

== See also ==
- Hisham's Palace
- Mar Saba

== Bibliography ==
- Conder, C.R.; Kitchener, H.H. (1883). The Survey of Western Palestine: Memoirs of the Topography, Orography, Hydrography, and Archaeology. Vol. 3. London: Committee of the Palestine Exploration Fund. (pp. 201-3)
- Guérin, V. (1874). Description Géographique Historique et Archéologique de la Palestine (in French). Vol. 2: Samarie, pt. 1. Paris: L'Imprimerie Nationale. (pp. 41-5)
- Jacobs, Daniel. Eber, Shirley. (1998) Israel and the Palestinian Territories Rough Guides. ISBN 1-85828-248-9
- Lee, Risha Kim. (2002) Let's Go 2003 Israel and the Palestinian territories Let's Go Incorporate. ISBN 0-312-30580-X
- Pringle, D. (1993). The Churches of the Crusader Kingdom of Jerusalem: A-K (excluding Acre and Jerusalem). Vol. I. Cambridge University Press. ISBN 0-521-39036-2. (pp. 252-258)
