= 'Ushsh el-Ghurab =

Hill located in the West Bank

ʿUshsh el-Ghurāb
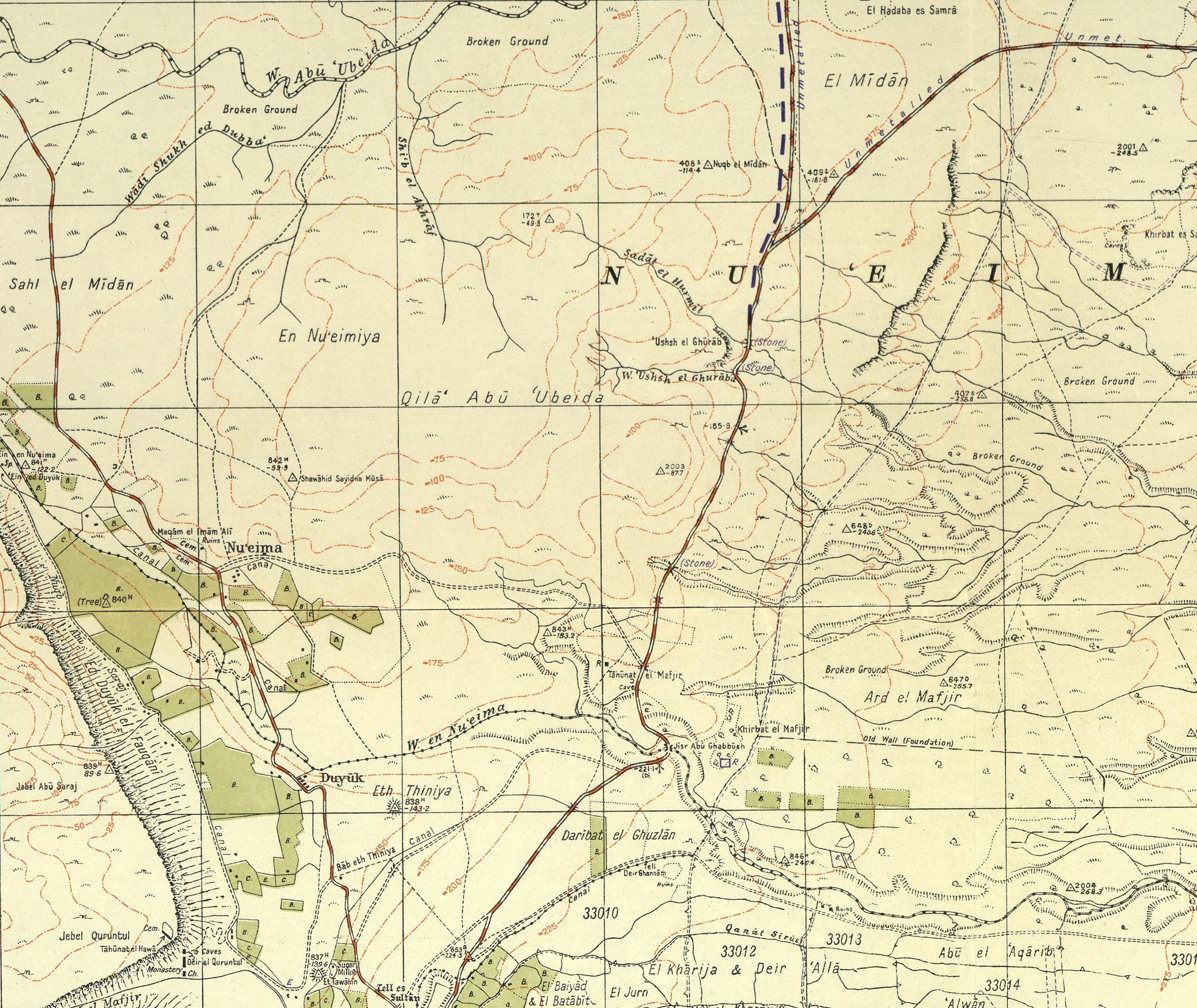
- 'Ushsh el-Ghurab in the 1941 Survey of Palestine

Highest point
- Elevation: −87.7 m (−288 ft)
- Prominence: c. 250 m (820 ft)
- Coordinates: 31°53′40″N 35°27′24″E

Naming
- Native name: جبل الغراب
- English translation: "Mount Raven's Nest"

Geography
- Location: Israeli-Occupied West Bank
- Country: Palestine
- Governorate: Jericho
- Municipality: Jericho

'Ushsh el-Ghurab is a hill located just north of Jericho in the West Bank. Its peak is −87.7 meters (−288 ft) relative to sea level, although it still rises appreciably above the still lower Plain of Jericho around it. Separated from the Mount of Temptation by the Wadi ed-Duyuk and the village and refugee camp of 'Ein ed-Duyuk el-Foqa, it was formerly identified as the location of part of Jesus's Temptation by the Devil.

== Name ==
Jebel ʿUshsh el-Ghurāb (جبل الغراب) is Palestinian Arabic for "Mountain of the Nest of the Raven" or, idiomatically, "of the Mushroom". It has also been variously transcribed as 'Ush Ghurab, Ush el Ghurab, 'Osh el Ghūrâb, and Jabal ʿUshsh al Ghurāb.

== Legend ==
As late as the 19th century, the nearby wadi—today the Wadi 'Ushsh el-Ghurab (وَادِي الغراب)—was known as the "Wadi of the Ascent of Jesus" (Wadi Mesāʼadet ʼAīsa). This preserved the local Arab legend that it was the summit of 'Ushsh el-Ghurab, rather than the nearby Mount of Temptation, where Jesus had been taken by the Devil to be offered dominion over all the kingdoms of the world.
