= Ein ad-Duyuk at-Tahta =

Arabic transcription(s)
  - Arabic: عين الديوك التحتا
- Location of Ein ad-Duyuk at-Tahta within Palestine
- Coordinates: 31°51′49″N 35°26′18″E
- State: State of Palestine
- Governorate: Jericho

Government
  - Type: Municipality

Population (2006)
  - Total: 967

Ein ad-Duyuk at-Tahta (Arabic: عين الديوك التحتا), is a Palestinian village in the Jericho Governorate in the eastern West Bank situated in the Jordan Valley, located two kilometers west of Jericho. According to the Palestinian Central Bureau of Statistics, Ein ad-Duyuk at-Tahta had a population of over 967 inhabitants in mid-year 2006. In 1997, refugees constituted 14.6% of the population. The primary health care for the village is in Jericho.

== See also ==
- 'Ein ad-Duyuk al-Foqa
- Dok, an ancient fortress on nearby Jebel Quruntul
