= Na'ama =

Israeli settlement in the West Bank

Na'ama: נָעֳמָה (Hebrew)
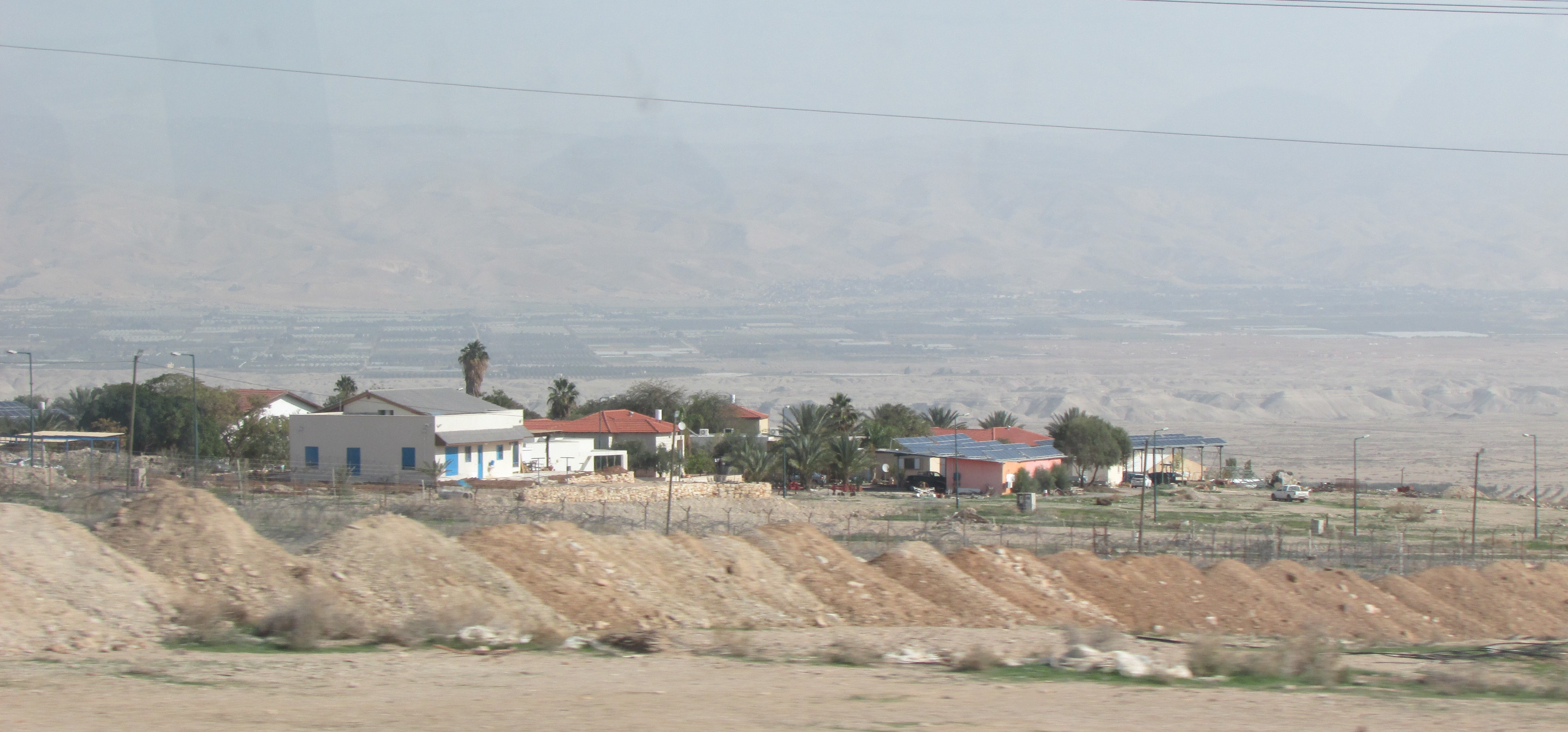

- Location within the Central West Bank
- Coordinates: 31°54′23″N 35°28′2″E
- Country: Palestine
- District: Judea and Samaria Area
- Council: Bik'at HaYarden
- Region: West Bank
- Affiliation: Moshavim Movement
- Founded: 1982
- Population (2024): 337

Na'ama (Hebrew: נָעֳמָה) is an Israeli settlement organized as a moshav shitufi in the West Bank. Located in the Jordan Valley three kilometres north of Hisham's Palace, it falls under the jurisdiction of Bik'at HaYarden Regional Council. In 2024 it had a population of 337.. The international community considers Israeli settlements in the West Bank illegal under international law, but the Israeli government disputes this.

== History ==
Na'ama was established in 1982, and was initially named Na'amadue to its proximity to the Palestinian village of an-Nuway'imah, before being renamed after the biblical figure of Naomi. According to ARIJ, in 1979 Israel confiscated 5,048 dunams of land from the Palestinian village of An-Nuway'imah to construct Na'ama.

The original name Na'ama was restored after the 2006 Lebanon War.
