= 1 Maccabees =

Biblical text about the Maccabean Revolt

1 Maccabees, (Note: Ancient Greek: Μακκαβαίων Αʹ, romanized: Makkabaíōn 1) also known as the First Book of Maccabees, First Maccabees, and abbreviated as 1 Macc., is a deuterocanonical book that details the history of the Maccabean Revolt against the Seleucid Empire as well as the founding and earliest history of the independent Hasmonean kingdom. It describes the promulgation of decrees by King Antiochus IV Epiphanes forbidding traditional Jewish practices, and the formation of a rebellion against him by Mattathias, a member of the Hasmonean family, and his five sons. Mattathias's son Judas Maccabeus (Judah Maccabee) takes over the revolt, and the rebels are collectively called the Maccabees; the book chronicles in detail the successes and setbacks of the rebellion. While Judas is eventually killed in battle, the Maccabees achieve autonomy and, under the leadership of the Hasmonean family, independence for Judea. Judas's brother Simon Thassi is declared High Priest of Israel by the will of the Jewish people. The time period described is from around 170 BC to 134 BC.

The author is anonymous, but he probably wrote in the newly independent Hasmonean kingdom after the success of the Maccabean Revolt in the late 2nd century BC. 1 Maccabees was probably written in Hebrew originally. However, this original Hebrew has been lost, and the work survives only in translation in Koine Greek in the Septuagint, the Greek version of the Jewish scriptures. The Septuagint was preserved by Christians as the basis for the Christian Old Testament. It became part of the deuterocanon in early Christianity. The book is held as canonical scripture today in the Catholic, Eastern Orthodox, and Oriental Orthodox churches (except for the Orthodox Tewahedo). The book is not included in the Hebrew Bible (Tanakh) and is not recognized as canonical by Protestant denominations or any of the major branches of Judaism. Some Protestants include the book in the biblical apocrypha, as material useful for background and edification but not canonical. Rabbinic Judaism generally disapproved of the rule of the Hasmonean dynasty, but the book is openly pro-Hasmonean, one of several factors contributing to its lack of enthusiasm within later Judaism.

1 Maccabees is best known for its account of the recapture of Jerusalem in the year 164 BC and rededication of the Second Temple: the origin behind the Jewish holiday of Hanukkah.

== Authorship and date ==
The author of 1 Maccabees is anonymous and unknown. He wrote in the post-independence Hasmonean kingdom, probably during the reign of High Priest John Hyrcanus (r. 134–104 BC), with a few scholars suggesting that early in the reign of Alexander Jannaeus (r. 103–76 BC) is also a possibility. (Note: Scholarly estimates for the date of authorship include: Seth Schwartz and Arnaldo Momigliano argue for "early" dates prior to 129 BC. Reasons include a reference to the Kingdom of Pergamon being promised vast territory by Rome that would be obviously false in retrospect after Rome's annexation of Pergamon in 129, as well as insular attitudes suggesting a smaller kingdom with fewer Gentiles than later in Hyrcanus's reign.; Bezalel Bar-Kochva also argues for an early date, and suggests before 125 BC, given the first-hand knowledge he sees of the Revolt in the work.; Uriel Rappaport and Daniel R. Schwartz argue for the later years of Hyrcanus's rule. Schwartz notes that the author condemns the "taking of crowns", suggesting the book was written before Aristobulus I declared himself king in 104–103 BC.; John R. Bartlett argues for somewhere between 110–90 BCE.; Jonathan A. Goldstein believes 1 Maccabees was published during Alexander Jannaeus's reign (103–76 BC), but argues that the first half of it was heavily based on a lost "Common Source" that was written in the 150s BC while the Revolt was fresh in memory and Jonathan Apphus was the leader of the Maccabees.) All agree that the book was written before 63 BC, as the author shows great admiration toward Rome and does not know of the Roman general Pompey conquering Jerusalem and reducing the Hasmonean kingdom to a client state of the Roman Republic in that year. He was likely a court historian or equivalent. The author appears to be very familiar with Judea and its geography, but appears less well-informed about the wider Hellenistic world. The entire work is generally considered to be a unity composed by a single author on both philological and thematic grounds, although there are occasional short passages sometimes contested as potentially being added at a later date.

== Title ==
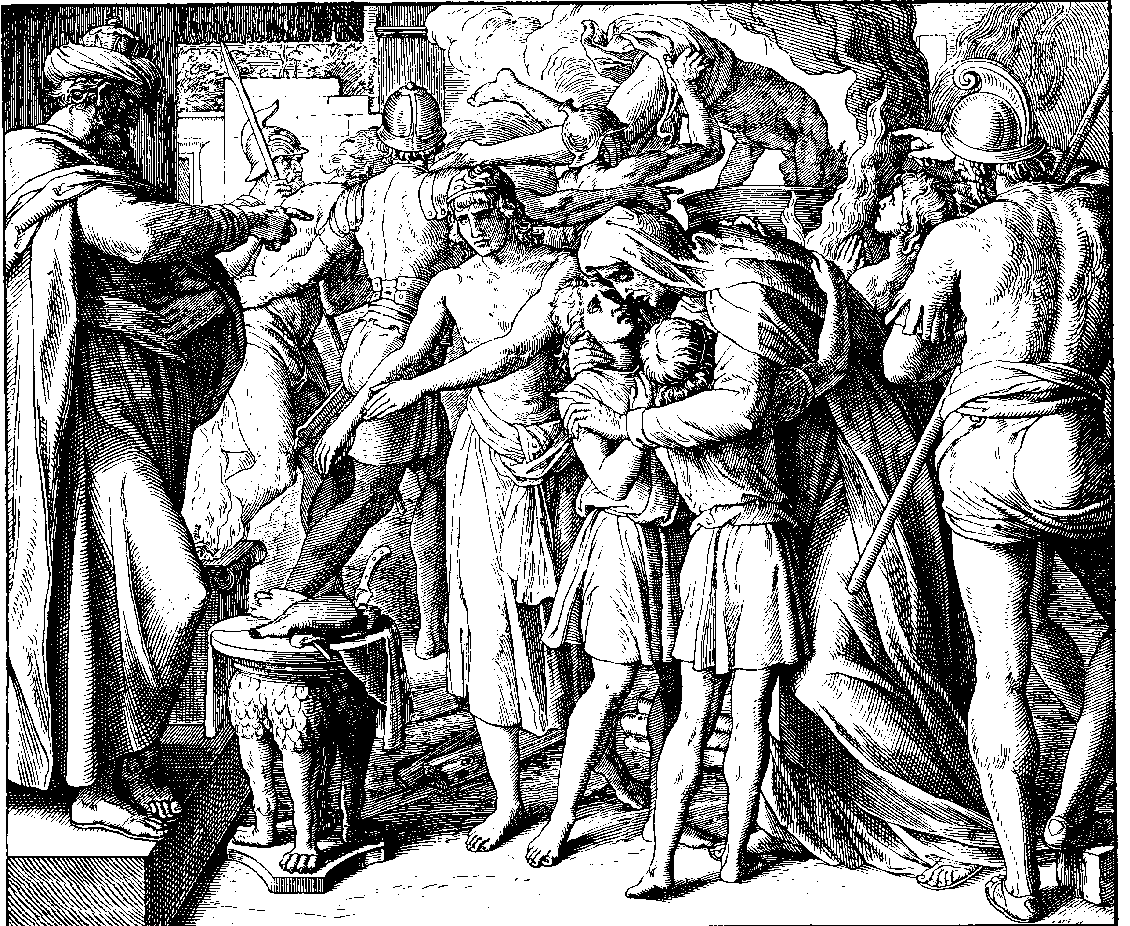
Martyrs refusing to sacrifice to the Greek idol from Die Bibel in Bildern

The title "1 Maccabees" is not the original title of the work. Rather, it comes from the Septuagint, which gave it that title to distinguish it from the other books of the Maccabees. In the book itself, "Maccabee" is used solely as a personal title for Judah Maccabee (Latinized as Judas Maccabeus). Judas's Maccabee title is generally tied to the Aramaic word maqqaba ("makebet" in modern Hebrew), "hammer" or "sledgehammer". It is unknown how he got this epithet; most presume it was in recognition of his prowess in battle. The word "Maccabees" in plural, however, does not appear to have been used until centuries after the Maccabean Revolt. At first, it was used to describe the martyrs described in 2 Maccabees. It later became a title given to the rebels as a whole around the 3rd–5th century AD, hence the Septuagint naming the works as books of the Maccabees. This usage of "Maccabees" as a group-term may have originated in Greek, as no usage of it in Hebrew to refer to the rebels survives from any era earlier than the 19th century.

Eusebius, in his book Church History, quotes Origen of Alexandria who says the title of the work was Sarbēth Sabanaiel, (Note: Ancient Greek: Σαρβηθσαβαναιελ, romanized: Sarbēthsabanaiel. Variants include Σαρβηθ Σα[ρ]βαναι ελ, Sarbēth Sa[r]banai El, and Σαρβηθ Σα[ρ]βανέελ, Sarbēth Sa[r]baneel) an enigmatic Greek transliteration from a putative Hebrew original title. It is thought that the most likely parts are the Aramaic səpar ("book"), bêt ("house" or "dynasty"), and 'ēl ("God"). Various reconstructions have been proposed for the overall phrase:

- Book of the Prince of the House of Israel, from the Hebrew שַׂר בֵּית יִשְׂרָאֵל, Sar Beit-Yisra'el, or "Book of the Prince of the House of God" שַׂר בֵּית אֵל, Sar Beit-El.
- Book of the House of the Princes of God,
- The Book of the Dynasty of God's Resisters (in the sense of "those who resist on God's behalf"), perhaps from סֵפֶר בֵּית סָרְבָנֵי אֵל, Sefer Beit Sarevanei El ("Book of the House who strive for God").
- The Book of the House of the Hasmoneans (or simply The Book of the Hasmoneans)

== Language and style ==
The book was probably originally written in Hebrew. Both Origen and Jerome claim to have seen a Hebrew text of 1 Maccabees. The surviving Greek script has Hebraisms and Hebrew idioms. It also seems to have been written in Judea where knowledge of Hebrew was more widespread. If it really was originally written in Greek, then the author was intentionally imitating Hebrew style in Greek. The book is not written in colloquial "common" Koine Greek of the 2nd century BC, but rather a more archaic style of Greek consciously imitative of the style of older scriptures. It frequently imitates biblical phraseology and directly cites biblical precedents. The English equivalent would be writing new books in the style of the King James Version of the Bible. It also uses anachronistic terms at times to make explicit parallels between the exploits of the Hasmoneans and earlier Jewish heroes; for example, it refers to the coastal region of Palestine as the land of the Philistines, although the Philistines were no longer a relevant cultural grouping in the era.

The book is generally classed as a historical book of the Bible. While the main focus is a recounting of history, some consider the book to have merit as literary art as well. The narrative is primarily prose text, but is interrupted by seven poetic sections, which imitate classical Hebrew poetry. These include four laments and three hymns of praise. Various historical documents are included as well, notably of negotiations and letters with the Roman Republic and Hellenistic Sparta.

== Contents ==
=== Structure ===
The vast majority of scholars and Bible translations divide the book into four or five sections by the leader of the rebellion:

1. Chapters 1–2: Introduction (Note: The Introduction is sometimes split into Chapter 1, Introduction, and Chapter 2, Mattathias.)
2. 3:1 to 9:22: The leadership of Judas Maccabeus
3. 9:23 to 12:53: The leadership of Jonathan Apphus
4. Chapters 13–16: The leadership of Simon Thassi

=== Synopsis ===
The setting of the book is about a century and a half after the conquest of Judea by the Greeks under Alexander the Great, after Alexander's empire had been divided so that Judea had become part of the Greek Seleucid Empire. It tells how the Greek ruler Antiochus IV Epiphanes attempted to suppress the practice of basic Jewish law, resulting in the Maccabean Revolt. The book covers the whole of the revolt, from 175 to 134 BC, highlighting how the salvation of the Jewish people in this crisis came through Mattathias' family, particularly his sons, Judas Maccabeus, Jonathan Apphus, and Simon Thassi, and Simon's son, John Hyrcanus. The doctrine expressed in the book reflects traditional Jewish teaching, without later doctrines found, for example, in 2 Maccabees. The First Book of Maccabees also gives a list of Jewish colonies scattered elsewhere through the Mediterranean at the time.

In the first chapter, Alexander the Great conquers the territory of Judea, and is later succeeded by the Seleucid Antiochus IV Epiphanes. After successfully invading the Ptolemaic Kingdom of Egypt, Antiochus IV captures Jerusalem and removes the sacred objects from the Temple in Jerusalem, slaughtering many Jews. He then imposes a tax and establishes a fortress in Jerusalem.

Antiochus then tries to suppress public observance of Jewish laws, in an attempt to secure control over the Jews. In 168 BC, he desecrates the Temple by setting up an "abomination of desolation" (establishing rites of pagan observance in the Temple, or sacrificing an unclean animal on the altar in the Holy of Holies). Antiochus forbids both circumcision and possession of Jewish scriptures on pain of death. He forbids observance of the sabbath and the offering of sacrifices at the Temple. He also requires Jewish leaders to sacrifice to idols. While enforcement may be targeting only Jewish leaders, ordinary Jews were also killed as a warning to others.

Hellenization included the construction of gymnasia in Jerusalem. Among other effects, this discouraged the Jewish rite of circumcision even further, which had already been officially forbidden; a man's state could not be concealed in the gymnasium, where men trained and socialized in the nude. However, 1 Maccabees also insists that there were many Jews who sought out or welcomed the introduction of Greek culture. According to the text, some Jewish men even engaged in foreskin restoration in order to pass as fully Greek.

The narrative reports that news of the desolation reaches Mattathias and his five sons, a priestly family who live in Modein. Mattathias calls upon people loyal to the traditions of Israel to oppose the invaders and the Jewish Hellenizers, and his sons begin a military campaign against them. There is one complete loss of a thousand Jews (men, women, and children) to Antiochus when the Jewish defenders refuse to fight on the Sabbath. The other Jews then reason that, when attacked, they must fight even on the holy day. In 165 BC the Temple is freed and reconsecrated, so that ritual sacrifices may begin again. The festival of Hanukkah is instituted by Judas Maccabeus and his brothers to celebrate this event (1 Maccabees 4:59).

More wars involving Judas and his brothers Simon and Jonathan are reported in chapters 5, 6 and 7. Chapter 6 reports the last days of Antiochus Epiphanes and the accession of his young son Antiochus V Eupator to the throne.

In chapter 8, Judas seeks an alliance with the Roman Republic, aiming to remove the Greeks. Verses 23–32 record an agreement between Rome and the nation of the Jews, whereby each party would act as a willing ally of the other and refuse to supply their enemies in time of war, specific warning being given to Demetrius I Soter that this pact would be activated against him if requested by the Jews. Jewish historian Uriel Rappaport asserts that "the majority of scholars today accept the authenticity of this document".

After the death of Judas and a period of lawlessness, he is succeeded by his brother Jonathan Apphus, whose battles with the Greek general Bacchides are recounted in chapter 9. Jonathan becomes high priest (1 Maccabees 10:20). Demetrius' death is reported in 1 Maccabees 10:50, and Ptolemy VI Philometor and Alexander Balas, claimant to the Seleucid throne, enter into an agreement under which Alexander marries Cleopatra Thea, Ptolemy's daughter (1 Maccabees 10:58). The relationship between Jonathan and Demetrius' son and successor, Demetrius II Nicator, is covered in chapter 11: Jonathan provides military support to Demetrius at the latter's request (verse 44), and a successful engagement against a popular revolt at Antioch enables the Jews to "gain glory in the sight of the king" (verse 51). Maccabees does not mention the involvement of the mercenaries who are mentioned in other accounts, whereas other accounts do not mention the Jewish involvement. Ultimately the relationship between Jonathan and Demetrius breaks down: Maccabees' opinion is that Demetrius "broke his word about all that he had promised; he became estranged from Jonathan and did not repay the favors that Jonathan had done him, but treated him very harshly".

Proposed alliances with Rome and with Areus of Sparta are covered in 1 Maccabees 12:1–23. Jonathan's capture in 143 BC, having been double-crossed by Diodotus Tryphon, is recorded in 1 Maccabees 12:48. Simon follows Jonathan as the next Jewish leader "in place of Judas and your brother Jonathan", taking on civil, military and liturgical roles: "great high priest, governor, and leader of the Jews". Simon fortifies Jerusalem (1 Maccabees 13:10) and secures the reoccupation of Joppa (1 Maccabees 13:11), leading the people in peace and prosperity until he is murdered by agents of Ptolemy, son of Abubus, who had been named governor of the region by the Macedonian Greeks. The period of peace and prosperity is celebrated in a biblical-style poetic passage, the "Eulogy of Simon", which Rappaport considers to be "one of the most important poetic passages in 1 Maccabees".

Simon is succeeded by his son, John, referred to by Josephus as John Hyrcanus.

== As dynastic history ==
The author propagates "Hasmonean propaganda" in the sense of upholding the righteousness of the Hasmoneans and their just claim to rule the Hasmonean kingdom. The Hasmoneans were not an obvious choice to be rulers; they did not descend from the priestly line of Zadok that had taken the office of High Priest for generations at the point of the Maccabean Revolt. The author seeks to promote the view that the Hasmoneans were indeed God's new chosen and would-be rulers in line with heroes of the Hebrew Bible. Various passages call back to Biblical passages such as Joshua's conquests or the battle of David and Goliath and equate the Hasmoneans' deeds with the earlier stories. Antipathy toward the Seleucid-friendly Hellenizing Jews is unsurprising, as they were enemies in war, but 1 Maccabees extends criticism to internal Jewish opponents of the Hasmoneans as well. In 1 Maccabees, those dissatisfied with the Hasmoneans "hated their nation" as a whole; the Hasmoneans were equated with Judea itself. Jews who complain about Judas's activities "bring to the king an accusation against the people". The book dismisses a defeat suffered by other commanders named Joseph and Azariah as because "they did not listen to Judas and his brothers. But they did not belong to the family of those men through whom deliverance was given to Israel." All of this makes clear that God has specifically chosen a new dynasty to rule Judea, the Hasmoneans.

While the book holds all the Hasmoneans in high regard, it praises Simon Thassi in particular, the person who would pass the High Priesthood to his sons and establish the dynasty. In Chapter 2, there is a line from a dying Mattathias who tells his sons to always listen to Simon and that "he shall be your father", seemingly praising him even over Judas. Chapter 14 also features a long panegyric praising Simon as a worthy leader.

== Theology ==
The school of philosophy seen in 1 Maccabees is often thought to be a predecessor to the philosophy of the Sadducees in later eras. Notably, the author makes no reference to the idea of a bodily resurrection, which the Sadducees opposed. That said, contemporary textual sources of the Sadducees are scant, so it is difficult to know for sure. The book also comes across as dismissive of martyrdom and passive approaches to resistance, seeing such gestures as futile and pointless. Some scholars go even farther than dismissive; Jonathan A. Goldstein wrote that the author had "considerable contempt for martyrs". For the author, bold military action while living is the proper response to oppression.

The author sees the revolt as divinely ordained, but downplays direct divine intervention such as miracles. Rather, the author interprets events as God using the military genius of Judas Maccabeus and his brothers as the instrument to achieve the liberation of Judea. One of the most notable and unusual aspects of the book of 1 Maccabees by absence is the lack of any direct mention of God. Rather, the book refers to "heaven" (ouranós) instead, such as Judas saying in a speech that "It is not on the size of the army that victory in battle depends, but strength comes from Heaven." Even if "heaven" is merely shorthand for "God in heaven", 1 Maccabees is remarkably secular in its depiction of the conflict. No angels or miracles come to save the Jews; rather, it is the divinely-approved firm leadership of the Hasmoneans that leads to victory.

The book 2 Maccabees, preserved with 1 Maccabees in the Septuagint, provides a striking contrast in theology, and the works are often compared. 2 Maccabees interprets the misfortunes of the Jews as God's punishment for their own sins; the author of 1 Maccabees depicts the problems as due to the external evil of Antiochus IV and his generals, not as a cleansing ordeal that was in some sense divine will.

The book draws a sharp contrast between Jews and Gentiles, similar to the books of Ezra and Nehemiah. The persecution of Antiochus IV presumably radicalized the Jews. That said, the author is still proud of forging alliances with others, citing negotiations with the Roman Republic and Sparta. Uriel Rappaport called it emblematic of Hasmonean politics, in general: that the Hasmonean state was an explicitly Jewish one that sought to separate itself from polytheism, yet was pragmatic and sought allies where they could be found.

== Reliability as history ==
1 Maccabees is the most extensive source of information on events in Judea from 175 to 135 BC. It has traditionally been considered highly trustworthy, though it is, to some extent, the "official" version of history from the Hasmonean and Maccabean points of view. Bezalel Bar-Kochva praises it as among the better military historiography of the period. He argues that the author was likely an eyewitness to at least some of the battles described, given his great accuracy and plausibility in describing terrain and troop movements, and was able to obtain firsthand accounts from others in interviews. He also cites the fact that it makes various "admissions against interest" such as openly describing rebel military defeats, unlike 2 Maccabees, which obscures or omits such matters.

Jonathan A. Goldstein argues that the book was imitative of older scriptures not merely in linguistic style, but also in content; that is, the author adjusted or invented events to make them fit biblical parallels better.

== Canonicity ==
Pope Damasus I's Council of Rome in 382, if the Gelasian Decree is correctly associated with it, issued a Christian biblical canon identical to the list given at Trent, including the two books of Maccabees. Origen of Alexandria (253), Augustine of Hippo (c. 397 AD), Pope Innocent I (405), Synod of Hippo (393), the Council of Carthage (397), the Council of Carthage (419), the Apostolic Canons, the Council of Florence (1442), and the Council of Trent (1546) listed the first two books of Maccabees as canonical.

During the Protestant Reformation, the book—along with other books in the Catholic deuterocanon—was classed as biblical apocrypha in Protestantism: material useful for background but not canonical. The 1643 Westminster Confession of Faith declared that the books "are of no authority in the Church of God, not to be any otherwise approved", for example.

The book was never included in the Hebrew Bible (Tanakh) and is not canonical by any mainstream movements of Judaism. Later Jewish leaders viewed the rule of the Hasmonean dynasty poorly for several reasons, and a document so openly celebratory of them was problematic. Even in stories set during the Maccabean period, references to Judas by name were explicitly removed to avoid hero-worship of the Hasmonean line.

== Influence ==
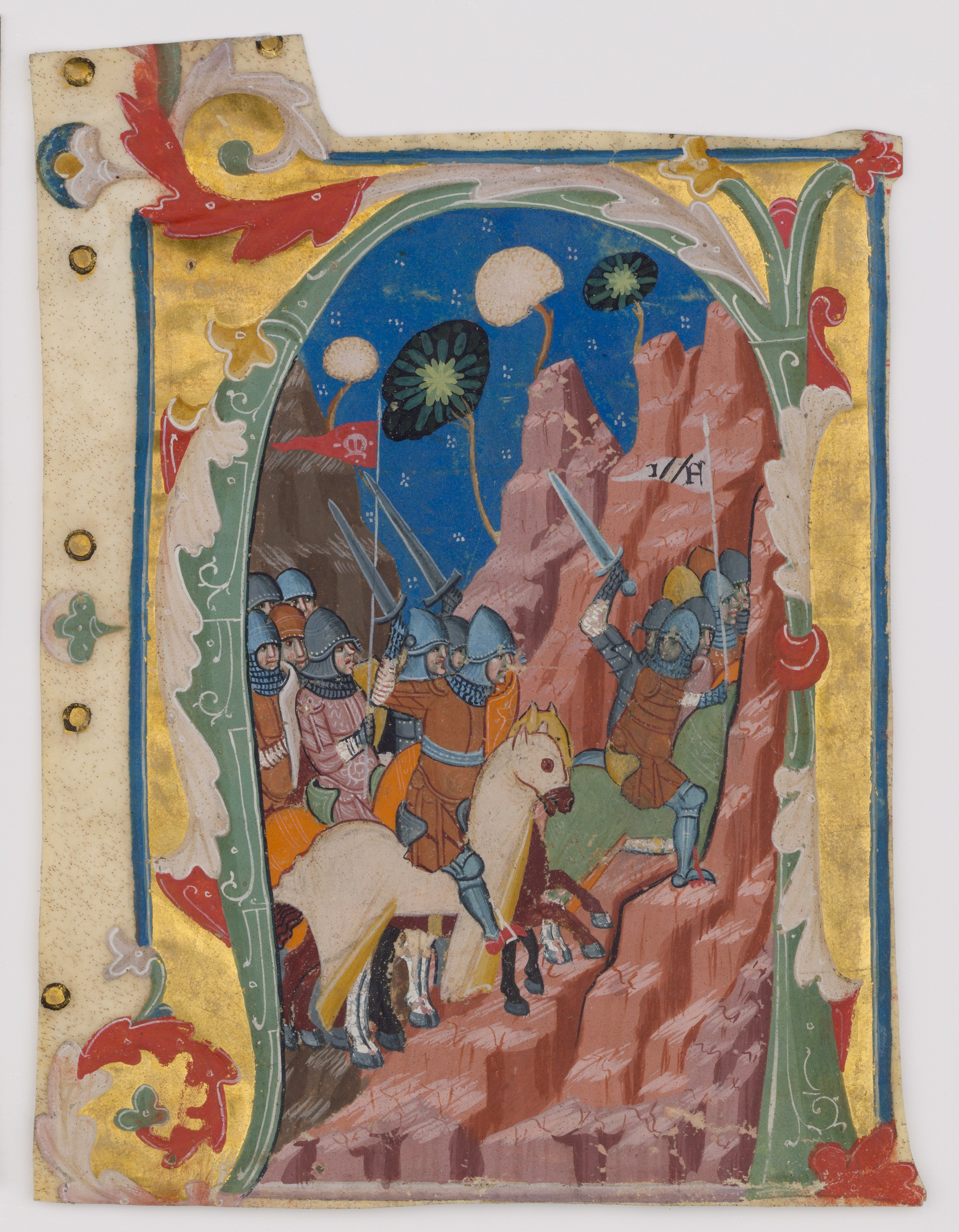
An illustration from a 14th-century Italian worship book depicting the Maccabees as mail-clad medieval knights.

The Jewish historian Josephus of the 1st century AD almost certainly read 1 Maccabees in Greek. He extensively uses the first thirteen chapters of it in Books 12 and 13 of his work Jewish Antiquities, paraphrasing it directly in parts, although supplementing it with other Greek histories such as Nicolaus of Damascus. He may also have consulted it for Book 1 of The Jewish War. It is not known whether Josephus's copy of 1 Maccabees was missing the final three chapters, or he simply found a better source for that era of history.

1 Maccabees is only very rarely quoted or referenced by the Church Fathers in the era of early Christianity. When Christians of the Roman Empire discussed the Maccabees, it was usually in reference to the "Maccabean martyrs" described in 2 Maccabees 6 and 2 Maccabees 7, as they were seen as models and precursors to Christian martyrs. As 1 Maccabees has very little to say about the martyrs, it correspondingly was not cited or read.

During the Crusades, Pope Urban II and other church leaders used 1 Maccabees to justify the concept of holy war against the Muslim kingdoms controlling the holy city of Jerusalem. Admired crusaders such as Baldwin I and Godfrey of Bouillon were explicitly compared to Judas Maccabeus, and material from 1 Maccabees was quoted in regards to their deeds. 1 Maccabees was also cited during the 11th–12th century Investiture Controversy concerning whether monarchs had the authority to appoint bishops, or only the Pope. 1 Maccabees includes passages describing the appointment of Jonathan and Simon by Seleucid authorities, so it was generally cited by the side of those who favored royal appointment of bishops.

== Liturgical usage ==
The Roman Catholic Lectionary makes use of texts from 1 Maccabees 1 to 6, along with texts from 2 Maccabees 6 and 7, in the weekday readings for the 33rd week in Ordinary Time, in year 1 of the two-year cycle of readings, always in November, and as one of the options available for readings for the dedication of an altar and as one of the suggested readings at a Mass celebrated to honour persecuted Christians.

1 Maccabees is part of the intertestamental Apocrypha section of the Bible used in the Lutheran Churches and the Anglican Communion. Scripture readings from the Apocrypha are included in the lectionaries of the Lutheran Churches. With regard to Anglicanism, in the Church of England's lectionary of 1922 in the Book of Common Prayer, 1st Maccabees is appointed annually to be read in late summer/early autumn.

The texts regarding the martyrdoms under Antiochus IV in 1 Maccabees and 2 Maccabees are read by Anabaptist Christians, who faced persecution in their history.

== Manuscripts and publication history ==
As noted above, if ancient manuscripts of the hypothesized original Hebrew version existed, they have been lost. The Greek text is extant in two of the three oldest codices of the Greek Septuagint: the Codex Sinaiticus and Codex Alexandrinus. It is not in the Codex Vaticanus. Pre-modern translations of the work were made in Latin, Syriac, and Armenian. The Latin translation is sometimes useful to identify certain changes made by Lucian of Antioch to the Greek text.

With the advent of the printing press that obviated the need for scribes to manually and repeatedly copy such works, 1 Maccabees became more widely available. It was included in standard printed Christian Bibles in the deuterocanon section. A Greek version of the text was printed for the first time in 1514–1517 in the Complutensian Polyglot Bible. Werner Kappler published a critical edition of the Greek text in 1936, an eclectic compilation of the various surviving manuscripts and the best construction of the original text.

More recent English language versions of the Bible which contain 1 Maccabees include the New Revised Standard Version (NRSV), Good News Translation (GNT), New American Bible, Revised Edition (NABRE), and the Knox Bible.

== Bibliography ==
- Bar-Kochva, Bezalel (1989). Judas Maccabaeus: The Jewish Struggle Against the Seleucids. Cambridge University Press. ISBN 0521323525.
- Bartlett, John R. (1998). 1 Maccabees. Sheffield, UK: Sheffield Academic Press.
- Goldstein, Jonathan A. (1976). I Maccabees: A New Translation, with Introduction and Commentary. The Anchor Bible Series. Vol. 41. Garden City, NY: Doubleday. ISBN 0-385-08533-8.
- Grabbe, Lester L. (2020). A History of the Jews and Judaism in the Second Temple Period: The Maccabean Revolt, Hasmonaean Rule, and Herod the Great (174–4 BCE). Library of Second Temple Studies. Vol. 95. T&T Clark. ISBN 978-0-5676-9294-8.
- Harrington, Daniel J. (2009) [1988]. The Maccabean Revolt: Anatomy of a Biblical Revolution. Eugene, Oregon: Wipf and Stock. ISBN 978-1-60899-113-6.
- Harrington, Daniel J. (2012). First and Second Maccabees. Collegeville, Minnesota: Liturgical Press. ISBN 978-0-8146-2846-1.
- Mendels, Doron (2021). "1 Maccabees". In Oegema, Gerbern S. (ed.). The Oxford Handbook of the Apocrypha. Oxford University Press. pp. 150–168. doi:10.1093/oxfordhb/9780190689643.013.9. ISBN 9780190689667.
- Rappaport, Uriel (2001). "1 Maccabees". In Barton, John; Muddiman, John (eds.). The Oxford Bible Commentary (Online ed.). Oxford University Press. ISBN 9780191979897.
- Schwartz, Daniel R. (2022). 1 Maccabees: A New Translation with Introduction and Commentary. The Anchor Yale Bible. Vol. 41B. New Haven & London: Yale University Press. doi:10.2307/j.ctv2t5xh30. ISBN 978-0-300-15993-6.
- Tedesche, Sidney; Zeitlin, Solomon (1950). The First Book of Maccabees. New York: Harper & Brothers.
- Williams, David S. (1999). The Structure of 1 Maccabees. The Catholic Biblical Quarterly Monograph Series 31. Washington, DC: Catholic Biblical Association of America. ISBN 0-915170-30-2.

1 Maccabees Deuterocanon / Apocrypha
Preceded by Esther	Roman Catholic Old Testament	Succeeded by 2 Maccabees
Preceded by Esther	Eastern Orthodox Old Testament	Succeeded by 2 Maccabees
