= Mount of Temptation =

Mount with a Christian Monastery in Jericho, in Palestine

Jebel Quruntul
- Mount of Temptation; Mount Quarantine
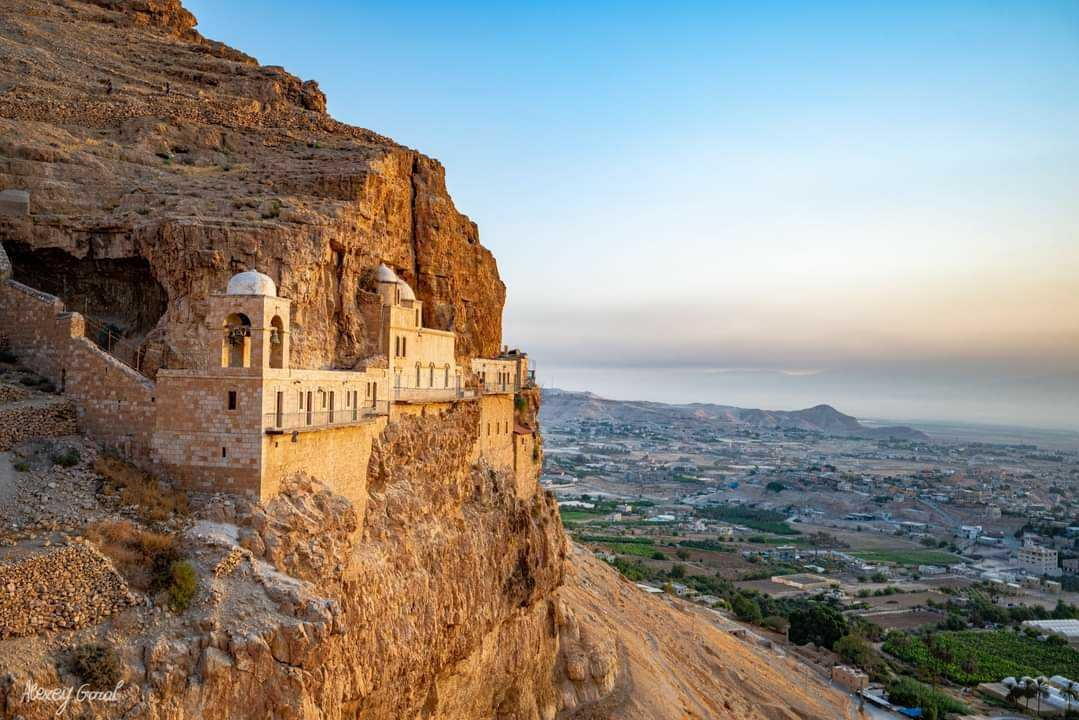
- The Greek Orthodox Monastery of the Temptation on Mt Quruntul, 2021

Highest point
- Elevation: 138 m (453 ft)
- Prominence: c. 400 m (1,300 ft)
- Coordinates: 31°52′29″N 35°25′50″E

Naming
- Etymology: Temptation of Jesus; Old French word for 'forty'
- Native name: جبل لقرنطل (Arabic)

Geography
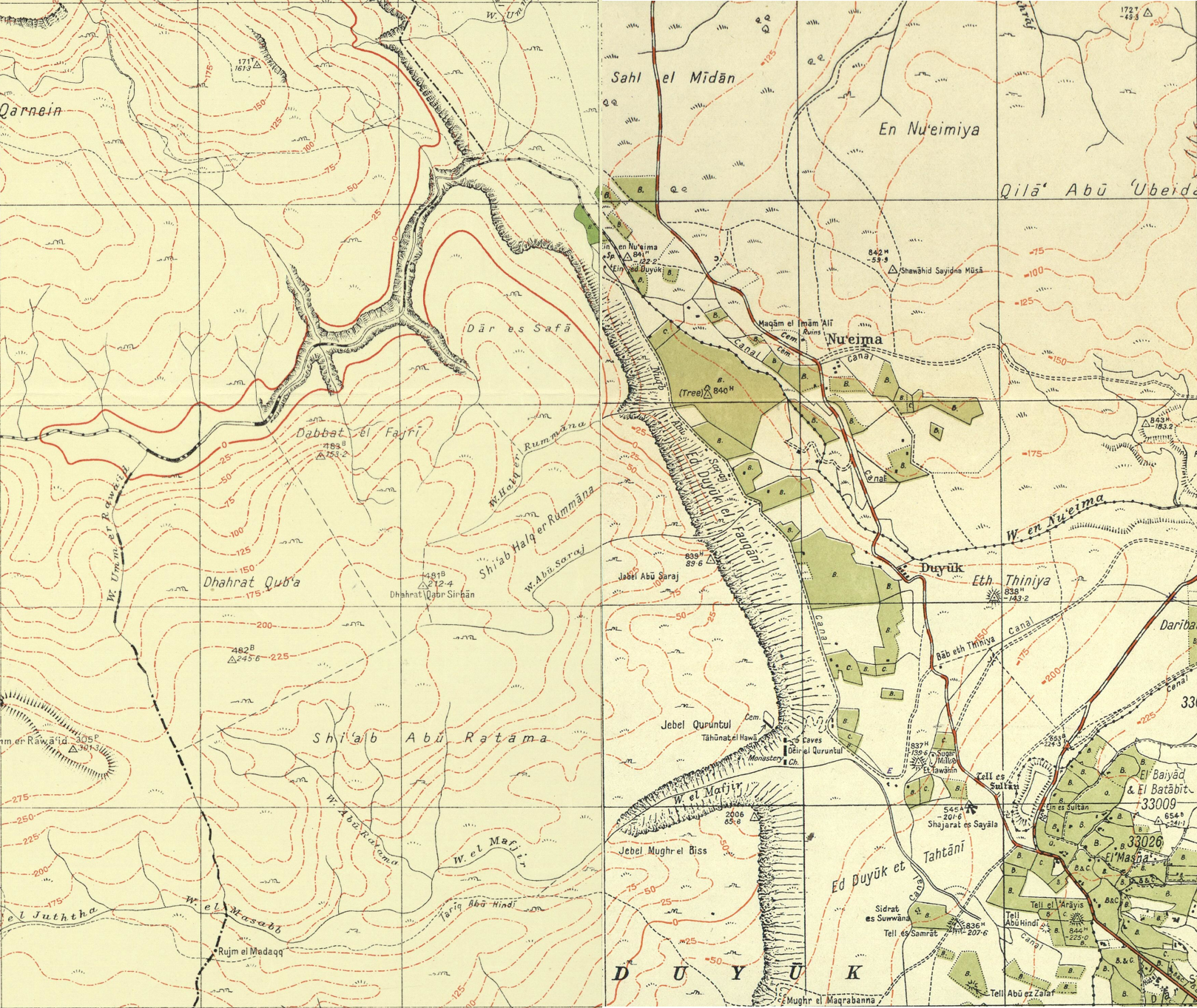
- Jebel Quruntul in the 1941 Survey of Palestine
- Location: Israeli-Occupied West Bank
- Country: Palestine
- Governorate: Jericho
- Municipality: Jericho
- Parent range: Judaean Mountains
- Biome: Judaean Desert

Geology
- Orogeny: Jerusalem Formation
- Rock age: Turonian
- Rock type: Limestone

Mount of Temptation, in Palestinian Arabic Jebel Quruntul (Arabic: جبل لقرنطل), is a mountain over the city of Jericho in the West Bank, Palestine; ancient Christian tradition identifies it as the location of the temptation of Jesus described in the New Testament Gospels of Matthew, Mark, and Luke, in which it is said that, from "a high place", the Devil offered Jesus rule over all the kingdoms of the world.

The city of Jericho lies at the feet east of Mount Quruntul, at 258 m (846 ft) below sea level, with the nearby Jordan River and the Dead Sea at even lower elevations, further to the east and southeast. The mount has around 400 m (1,300 ft) of prominence over Jericho, which translates to an elevation of 138 m (453 ft) above sea level, and offers a commanding view of its fabled surroundings to the east.

== Dok or Dagon fortress ==
Quruntul has been the location of a Seleucid and Maccabean fortress known as Dok (also known as Dagon). It was the scene of the assassination of Simon Maccabeus and two of his sons in 134 BC. Held by the last Maccabean ruler, Antigonus, during his war with Herod, the latter later improved the fort's water system.

== Christian significance ==
Since at least the 4th century, Christian tradition has specifically associated the forty days of Jesus's fasting that preceded his temptation with a cave on Jebel Quruntul. Eventually, it came to be associated with the high mountain in the Gospel's description of temptation. Centuries after the death of Jesus, the mount became the site of a lavra-type monastery, turned into a Catholic monastery during Crusader rule over the Holy Land, and then into an Orthodox monastery since the late Ottoman period. Since 1998, the monastery halfway up the mountain has been connected with the tell holding the remains of ancient Jericho via a cable car and a center of religious tourism. In 2014, the mountain and monastery were made part of the State of Palestine's "Jericho Oasis Archaeological Park". It has also been nominated to the Tentative List for World Heritage status as part of religious traditions of El-Bariyah, the Judaean Desert.

== Names ==
=== Bible ===
The first time the place is mentioned is in the Bible. Ketef Jericho is part of Mount of Temptation and is known for its many caves. They are mentioned in the Book of Joshua, it is the location where Rahab sent the spies, while in the Book of Maccabees and "The Jewish War" it is noted as the refuge place to where Ptolemy son of Abubus fled after assassinating Simon son of Mattathias.

=== Related to the Gospels ===
The standard Koine Greek texts of the New Testament state that, after his baptism in the Jordan River, Jesus went into a "solitary" or "desolate place" (Ancient Greek: εἰς τὴν ἔρημον, eis tḕn érēmon, or ἐν τῇ ἐρήμῳ, en tē̂ erḗmō). All three passages where this is mentioned are traditionally translated into English as "the wilderness", although the same term is variously rendered in other locations in the Bible as a "secluded place", a "solitary place", or "the desert". As the second temptation in Luke and the third in Matthew, from "a high mountain" (εἰς ὄρος ὑψηλὸν, eis óros hypsēlòn), the Devil offered Jesus "all the kingdoms of the world" (πάσας τὰς βασιλείας τοῦ κόσμου, pásas tàs basileías toû kósmou, or τῆς οἰκουμένης, tē̂s oikouménēs). On the Crusader-period Uppsala Map of Jerusalem, it appears as "mons excelsus", literally "high mountain" (see here, top right quadrant).

When this passage was connected to a specific hill in late Antiquity, it was eventually given the name Mount Quarantine (Latin: mons Quarantana, Quarantena, Quarennia, Quarantania, Querentius, etc), after the 40-day period mentioned in the biblical accounts, quarranta being a Late Latin form of classical quadraginta ("forty").

This was preserved in Arabic as Mount Quruntul (جبل لقرنطل, Jebel el-Qurunṭul), also transliterated Jabal al-Qurunṭul, Jebel Kuruntul, Jebel Kŭrŭntŭl, Jabal al-Quruntul, and Jabal al Qarantal, and eventually properly translated as Jebel el-Arba'in (جبل الأربعين, Jabal al-Arba'in, 'Mount of the Forty').

The name Mountain of Temptation, later Mount of Temptation, was first attested in English in 1654.

In modern times the name has been calqued into Arabic as Jebel et-Tajriba (جبل التجربـة), literally 'Mount of the Temptation'.

=== Related to the ancient fortress ===
The Hebrew name of the Maccabean fortress on this hill is not separately recorded but was transliterated into Greek as Dōk (Ancient Greek: Δωκ; Latin: Docus; Arabic: دوكا) in 1 Maccabees and as Dagṑn (Δαγὼν) in the works of Josephus. The same name was preserved as Douka (Δουκα) as late as the early monasteries founded in the 4th century and two small settlements near the springs at the base of the mountain continue to bear the name Duyūk (ديوك). In Modern Hebrew, it is called Qarantal (קרנטל), after the Arabic name.

== Christian traditions ==
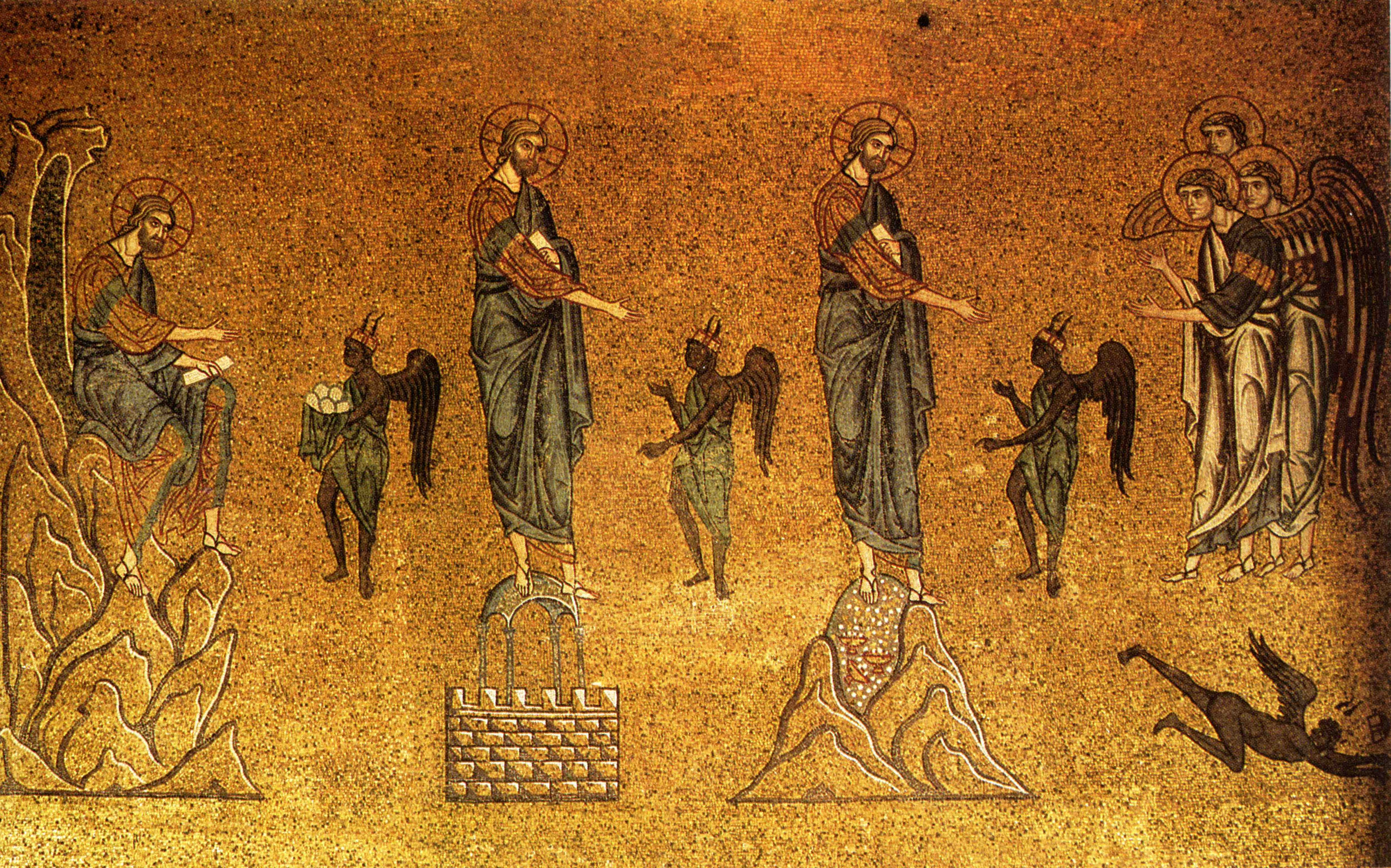
The three temptations of Christ in a 12th-century mosaic in St Mark's, Venice

In the Synoptic Gospels of the Christian Bible, after his baptism by John in the River Jordan, Jesus is said to have been driven by the Spirit into the "wilderness", where he fasted for 40 days and 40 nights before being tempted by the "devil" or "Satan". The account in Mark says as much in brief summary. The account in Matthew describes the devil tempting Jesus first with his ability to provide himself food to end his hunger, then traveling to the Temple in Jerusalem and tempting him with threatening suicide to prompt action from God's angels, and finally traveling to a high mountain and tempting him with dominion over all the kingdoms of the world with the attendant glory. On each occasion, Jesus refuses to misuse his power to sate human appetites, to misuse his position to test God's will, or to countenance worship of anyone other than God. The account in Luke is essentially the same, but the order of the last two temptations is reversed.

A separate tradition recorded in John Phocas's Ecphrasis, a 12th-century pilgrimage report, was that one of the tells at the base of the mount once held a temple commemorating the location where Joshua supposedly saw the archangel Michael (KJV).

== History ==
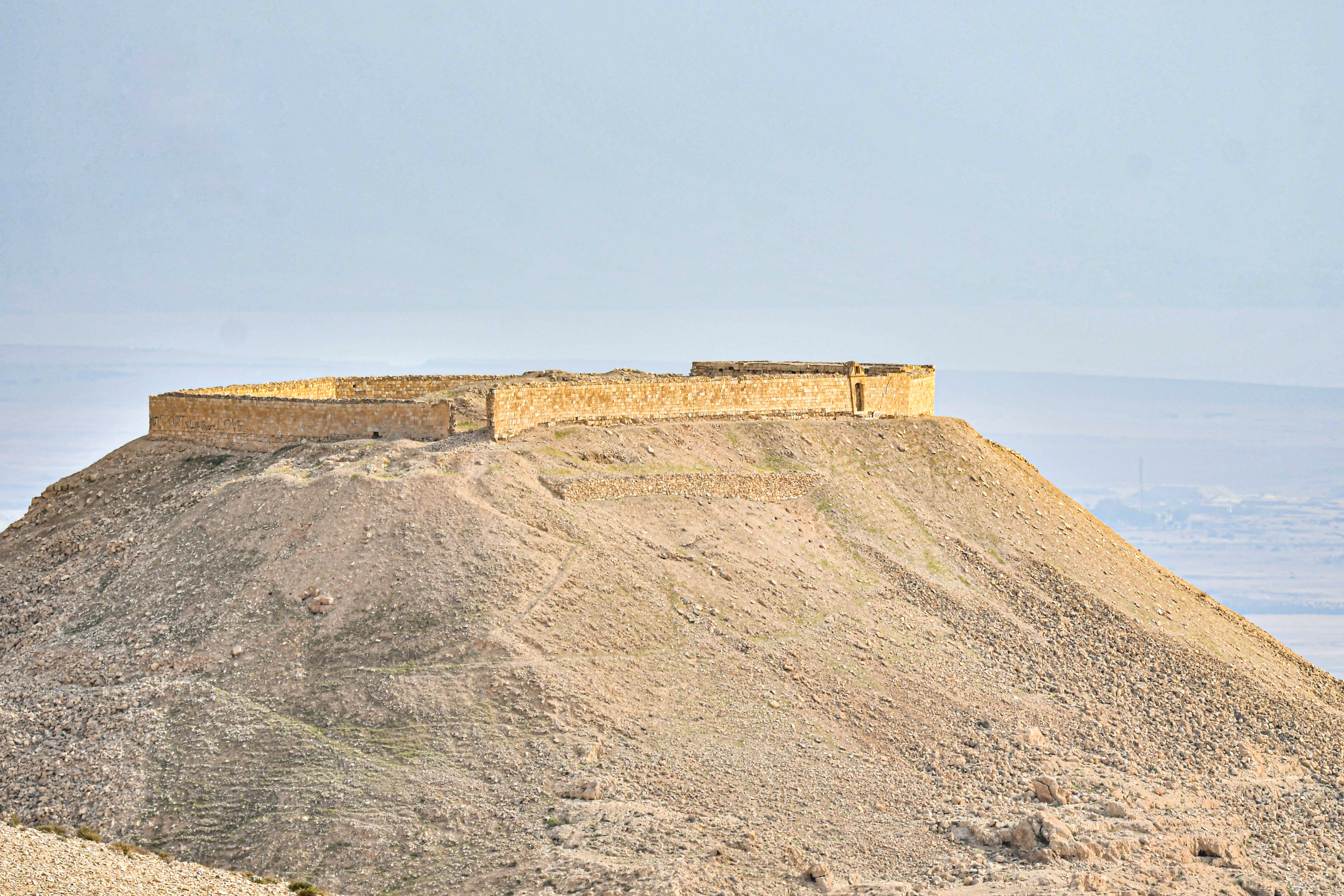
The precinct walls of an abandoned Russian monastery project at the summit, 2017

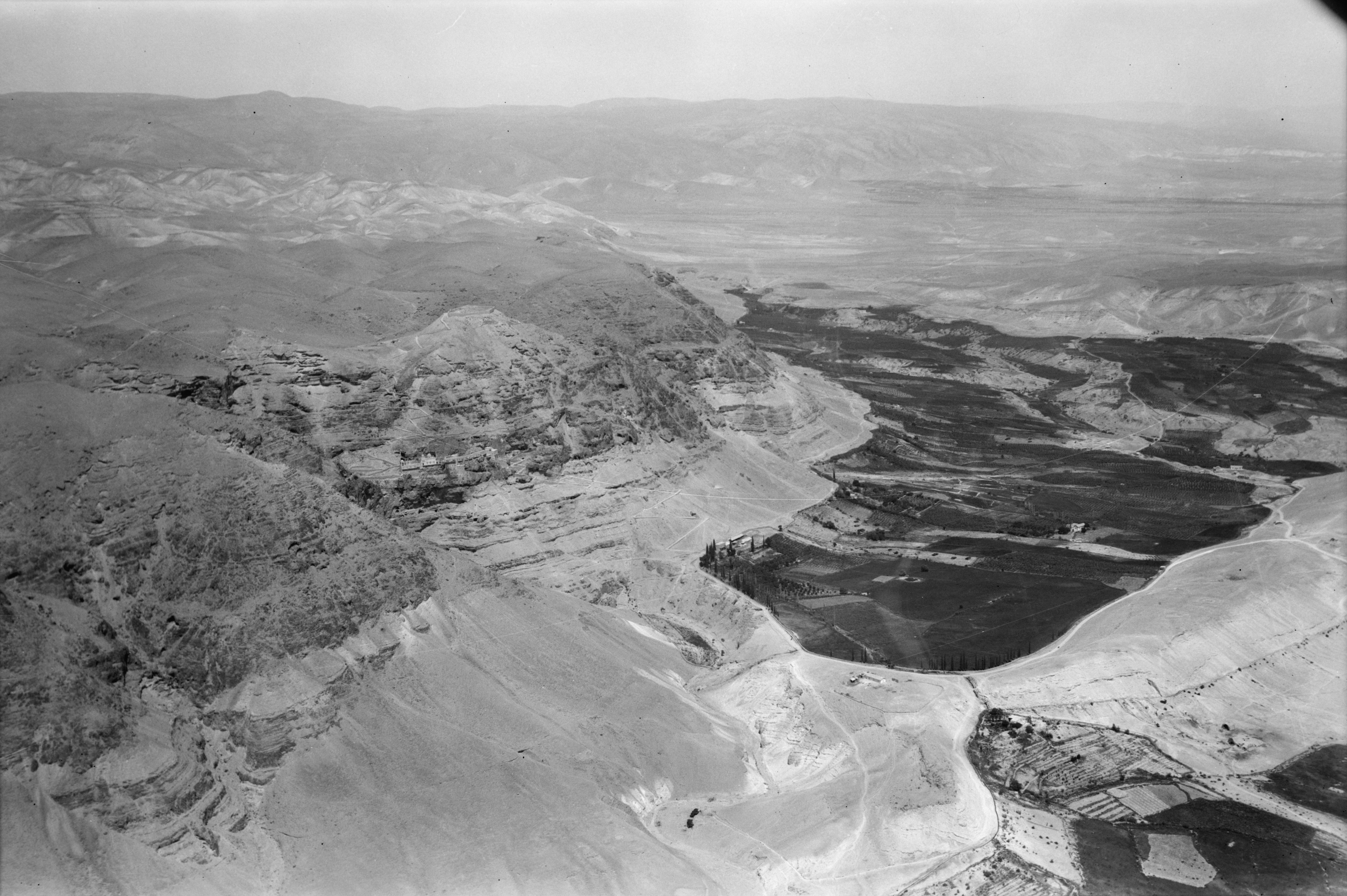
Jebel Quruntul overlooking the Plain of Jericho, 1931

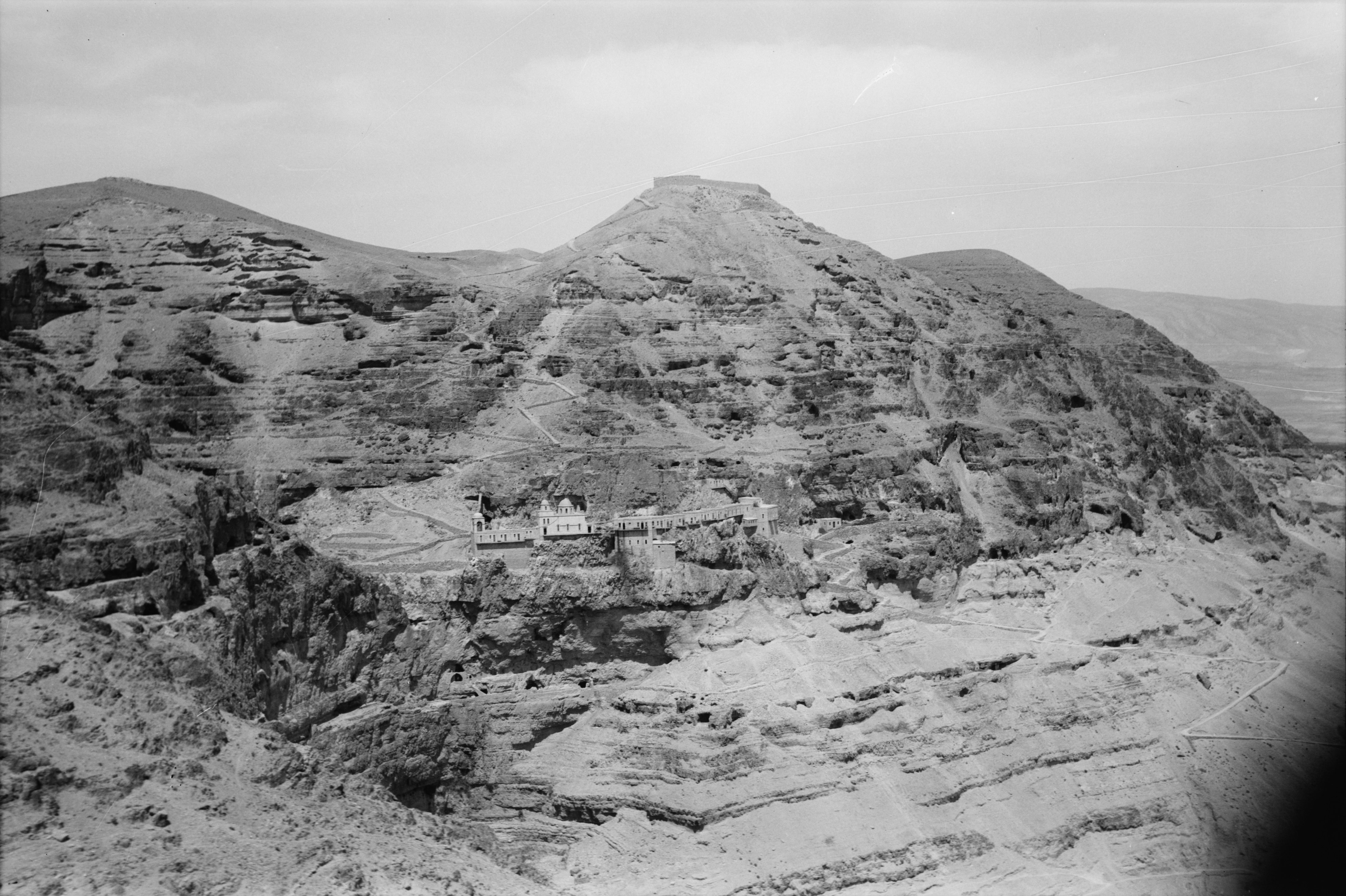
Mt Quruntul, 1931

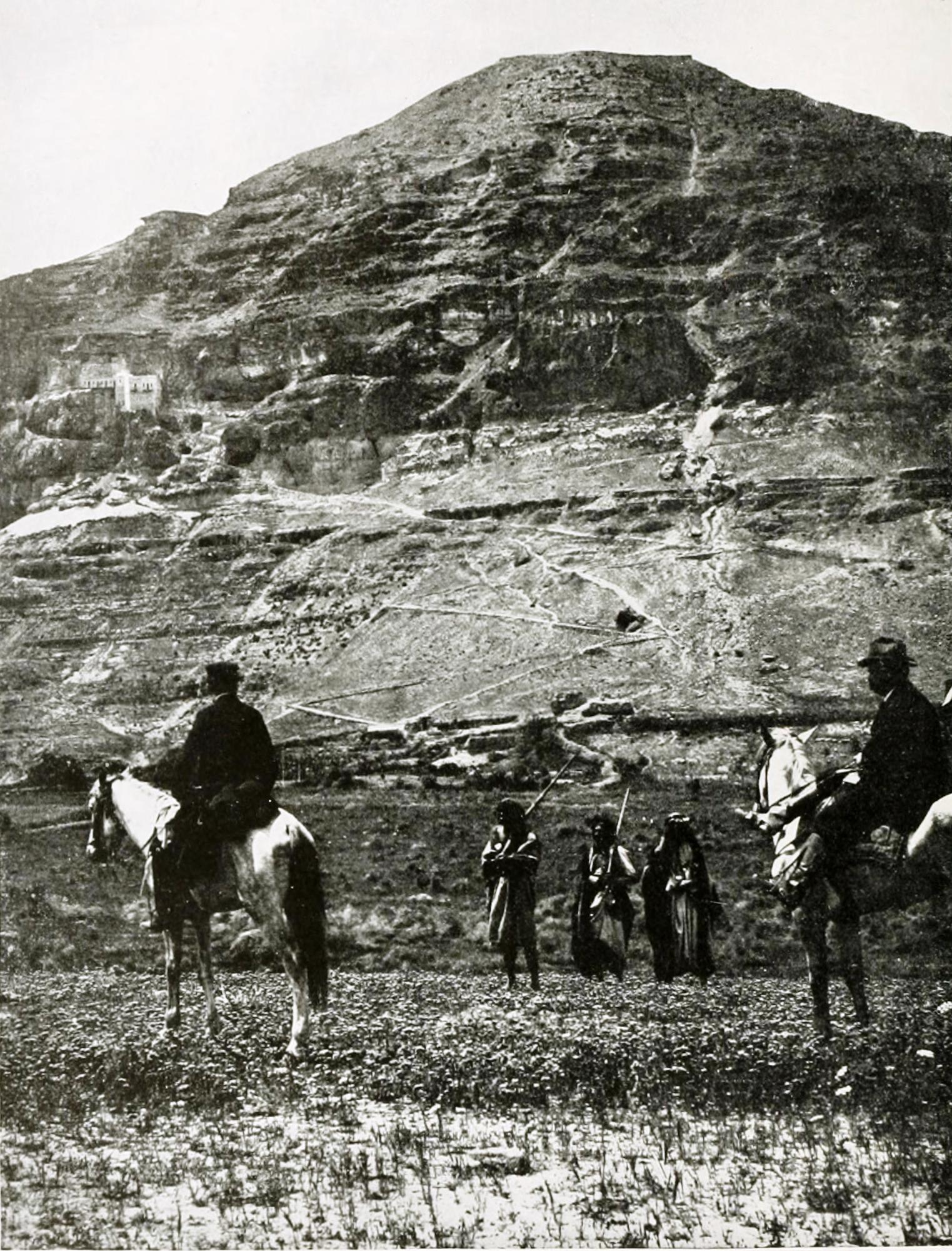
Jebel Quruntul, 1910

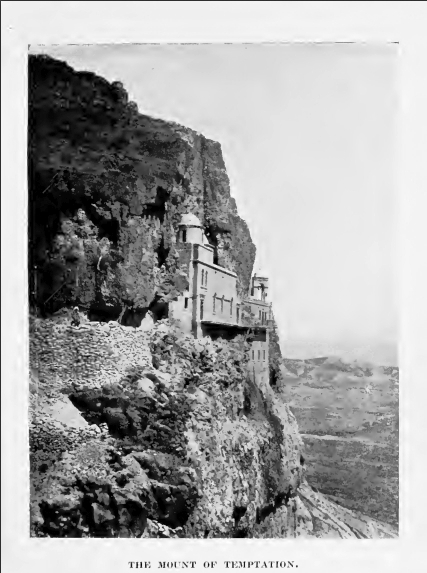
The monastery in 1913

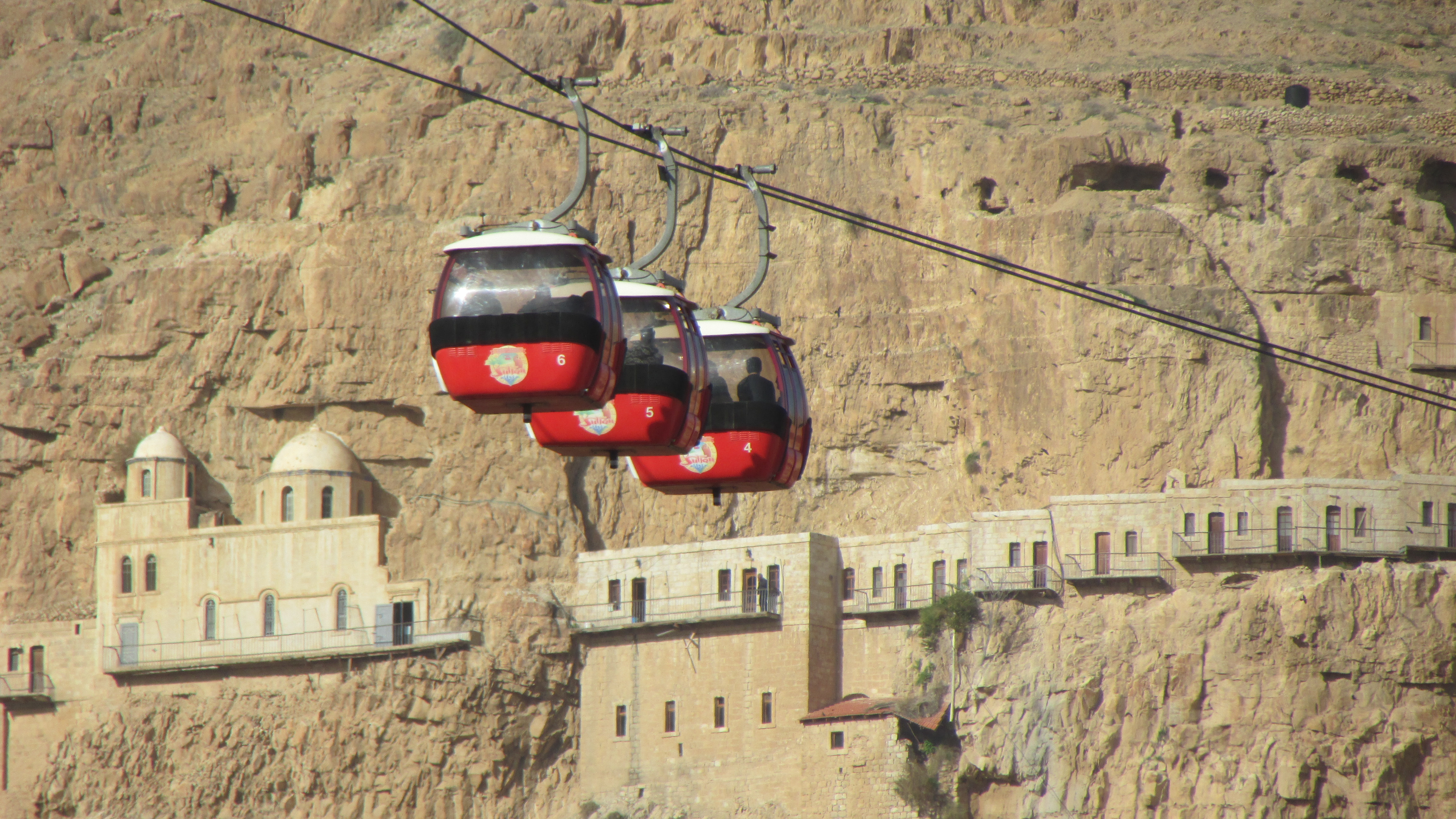
The Jericho Cable Car (Sultan Téléphérique), 2019

=== Bronze Age to Hellenistic period ===
Jebel Quruntul is a limestone peak controlling the main paths from Jerusalem and Ramallah to Jericho and the River Jordan since antiquity, possibly the same as the "desert road" (דרך המדבר, derech hamidbar) mentioned in Joshua 8:15 & 20:31 and Judges 20:42. Nomads have frequented the oasis at Jericho, watered by the Ein es-Sultan spring, also known as Spring of Elisha, for at least 12,000 years. There was small settlement on the slopes of Quruntul around 3200 bc during the early Bronze Age. The area was conquered by the Israelites around 1200 bc, but there are no records of important battles in the area during the subsequent conquest by the Assyrians, Babylonians, Persians, Macedonians, or the Diadochi.

==== Maccabean Revolt ====
By the time of the Maccabean Revolt, the Seleucid general Bacchides had fortified the summit of Quruntul. This garrison fell to the Jewish revolt in 167 bc, but was retaken and remanned by Bacchides following his victory at Elasa in 160 bc. The emperor Antiochus VII Sidetes appointed a certain Ptolemy as commander of this garrison and the lands around Jericho. Using the fort as his main stronghold, he held a banquet there where he slew the Jewish high priest Simon Thassi, his father-in-law, along with two of his brothers-in-law in 134 bc. Simon's third son John Hyrcanus then succeeded his father and attacked. Encircled by the Judean army, Ptolemy threatened to throw John's mother, his own mother-in-law, from the fort and over the cliff. The woman supposedly pled for her son not to shirk his duty on her account, after which he continued the assault. She was first tortured and then, after John was forced to withdraw from the siege to honor the seventh year of rest then observed by the Jews, killed. Receiving insufficient reinforcements from Antiochus to hold his position, Ptolemy then fled to Zeno Cotylas, the tyrant of Philadelphia (now Amman, Jordan).

In the first century BC, during Herod's conflict with Antigonus for the throne of Judaea, Dok was seized by Antigonus. Herod subsequently made improvements to the water system at the site.

=== Late Roman and Byzantine periods ===
At some point in late Antiquity, Jebel Quruntul became associated with the entire 40 days of fasting which preceded the temptation of Jesus and then with the temptation itself, which occurred on the "high mountain" from which he saw "all the kingdoms of the world and the glory of them". Tradition ascribed its "rediscovery" to St Helena, the pious mother of Constantine the Great, during her tour of the Holy Land sometime after ad 326. In 340, Chariton the Confessor established a lavra-type monastery on the mountain, then still using a form of its earlier Hebrew and Seleucid name. The lavra was not at the top of the mountain but beside the Grotto of the Temptation, the cave supposedly identified by Helen as the location of Jesus's 40 days of fasting. In all, 35 other cells were hollowed out on the east face of the mountain to house the monks. The wider area saw several other churches and monasteries erected over the next few centuries, most notably the monastery in Wadi Qelt, established by John of Thebes and made famous by George of Choziba. This initial period of Christian development came to an end with the 614 campaign of the Byzantine–Sasanian War, when the Persians were able to leverage a Jewish revolt to briefly conquer Jerusalem. The monasteries of Quruntul and Jericho were plundered and depopulated, recovery being prevented by the rapid Muslim conquest of Palestine in 635 and 636.

=== Early Muslim and Crusader periods ===
Relatively peaceful coexistence of Christians, Jews, and Muslims in the area ended in the 11th century with al-Hakim's persecutions, the invasions of the Seljuks, and the onset of the First Crusade. The Byzantine emperor Manuel I (r. 1143–1180) rebuilt the area's Orthodox monasteries. The two sites supposedly identified by St Helena centuries earlier, however, saw new Catholic chapels raised, and monks of the Holy Sepulchre used the site of Chariton's lavra beside the Grotto for a priory dedicated to John the Baptist, erected in 1133 or 1134. The relative importance of the Grotto and the priory led to the mountain itself becoming known to the numerous pilgrims of the era as "Mount Quarantine". The priory was granted the tithes of Jericho two years later. In 1143, this income was valued equivalent to 5,000 aurei (45.2 lb or 20.5 kg of gold) per year and was transferred from the monks to the Sisters of Bethany by Queen Melisende of Jerusalem.

Around the same time, the Knights Templar constructed a small but formidable fortification on the mountaintop, storing water in Hellenistic cisterns and caches of weapons and supplies in the mountain's caves. It appears likely that the Templar stronghold made use of parts of the Hasmonean and Herodian walls, as well as a Byzantine chapel that had been erected within them. The still-extant base of its walls form a rough rectangle about 76 m × 30 m (250 ft × 100 ft). The order's Hierarchical Statutes from the 1170s or early 1180s charged the Commander at Jerusalem to always have ten knights available to reinforce the route past Jebel Quruntul and to protect and supply any noblemen who might travel it. Around the same time, Theodoric's Little Book reported that at least a few Templars or Hospitallers accompanied any group of pilgrims along the route against any local bandits or Bedouin raids. Burchard describes visiting Jebel Quruntul in his Description, but places the actual site of the Temptation at another location closer to Bethel. Wilbrand's Itinerary considered it genuine.

The area was lost to the Christians shortly after their 1187 defeat at Hattin to the Ayyubid sultan Saladin and largely depopulated.

=== Ottoman period ===
Exposed to continual Bedouin raiding, the area continued to languish under Ottoman rule. Writing in the early 18th century, the Dutch diplomat J.A. van Egmond reported that the local Arabs used the mountain's caves for protection and concealment. They had long forbidden Europeans to come near, but some of the Christian bishops in Palestine finally worked out an arrangement to pay them 10 silver kuruşlar a year for safe passage, after which pilgrims were again permitted to climb to the grotto and the top of the mountain with a local guide. Isolated travelers were sometimes robbed along the route but, in the case of a servant of a French ambassador to the area, the mutasarrif of Jerusalem personally intervened to force the area's village leaders to restore everything that had been stolen. Van Egmond noted the Fathers of the Holy Sepulchre he traveled with continued to believe the ruined chapel at the Grotto of the Temptation had been personally established by St Helena but its construction did not seem nearly so ancient to his eyes.

=== Modern times ===
Amid the weakening of the Ottoman Empire and the increasing assertiveness of European empires, Christian pilgrimage to the Holy Land began to rise in the late 19th century, alongside teams of archaeologists and missionaries. The monastery, now dedicated to St John the Baptist, was rebuilt from 1874 to 1904, its care being given to Greek Orthodox monks in 1905. Following World War I, Britain's League of Nations mandate over Palestine saw modern irrigation systems introduced to the area around Jericho, which prospered as a center of fruit harvesting. The chaos around the creation of Israel, the Palestinian exodus, and subsequent wars and conflict limited access, tourism, and economic development in the area although Jordan's King Hussein welcomed archaeological work, in part to undermine Israeli claims that the area had been primarily Jewish for most of its history. A 2002 excavation in the caves of Jebel Quruntul found that one had been used for burials from the Chalcolithic to the Islamic Age.

In 1998, during the period of relative peace following the Oslo Accords, Palestinian businessman Marwan Sinokrot constructed a 1,330 m (4,360 ft) 12-cabin cable car from the ruins of ancient Jericho to the Greek monastery, capable of carrying up to 625 people an hour in preparation for an expected influx of tourists during the millennium celebrations of the year 2000. Religious tourism makes up over 60% of Jericho's total visitors (estimated at 300,000 people per year in 2015), and the aerial lift cut the time to reach the monastery from as long as 90 minutes to as little as 5. The company secured recognition from the Guinness Book of World Records as "the longest cable car aerial tramway below sea level" but the Second Intifada began shortly thereafter, again limiting tourism in the area. The project also ran into difficulty with the mountain's monks, who had not been consulted about the project and sometimes shut the monastery doors to groups of tourists, but continues to operate. Jebel Quruntul, its fortress, and its monastery form part of the El-Bariyah "Wilderness" area proposed for World Heritage status in 2012 and were included in the Jericho Oasis Archaeological Park established with Italian help in 2014.

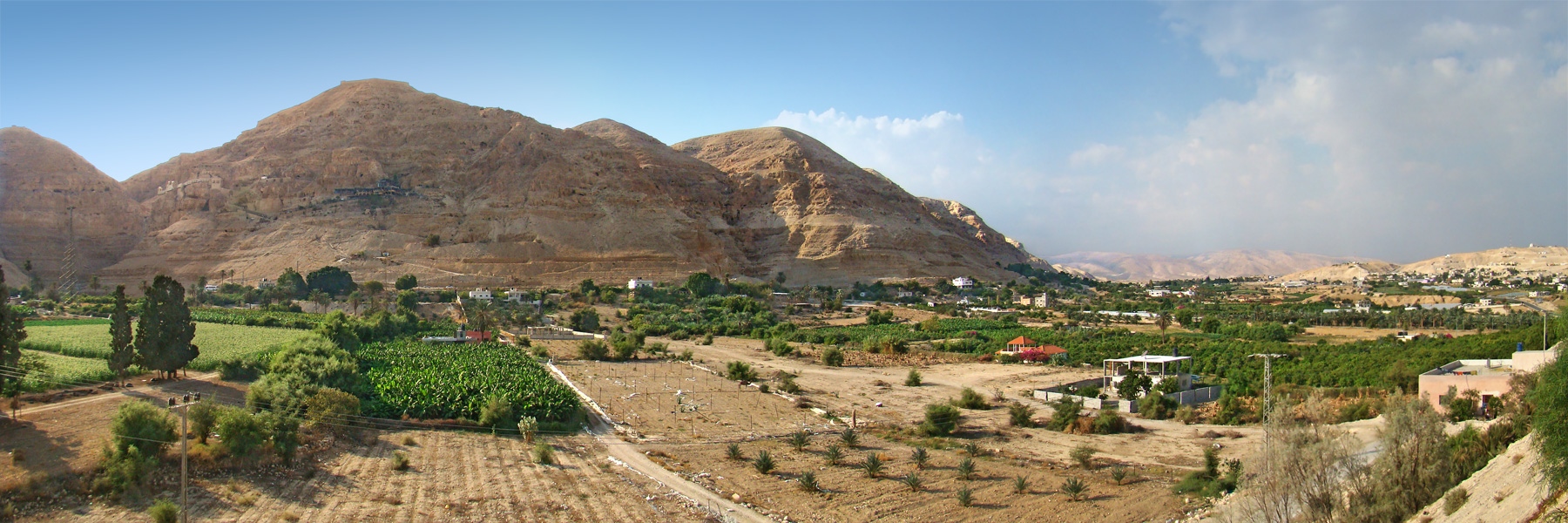
Mt Quruntul from the Jericho Plain, 2012. Part of 'Ushsh el-Ghurab is visible to the right.

== Caves ==
=== Abi'or Cave ===
The name derives from a persons name on a scroll from the fourth century BCE that was discovered there. The cave was surveyed as part of the 1993 "scroll Operation". It is a small cave with three entrances and a length of 26 meters. In the cave archaeologists discovered finding from the Chalcolithic period that include beads, bones fragments and other small findings, suggesting the cave may have served as a burial site, based on comparisons with finds from Sandal cave.

Other findings include items from the Roman period which include Papyrus scrolls that were discovered inside an early Roman cooking pot dating to the fourth century BCE. Additionally, three scrolls were identified from the Roman period. Skeletons of 38 individuals were found on a terrace below the cave, along with scroll remnants from both the early and later Roman periods, indicating reuse and cleaning in subsequent periods.

Among the scrolls from the Roman period, one dates to the conquest of Jericho by the Persian king Artaxerxes in 343 BCE, possibly brought there by refugees fleeing the conquest of Ptolemy I. A drachma coin minted in 323 BCE during Alexander the Great’s reign was also found.

Artifacts from the Bar Kokhba revolt include various pottery vessels, glassware, a Roman oil lamp, a bronze ring, a comb, textile fragments, leather sandals, and a needle. Additionally, three bronze coins from Hadrian's period were found, two minted in Caesarea and one in Gaba Hippeon. From the 14th century, a Mamluk coin and pottery shards were also found.

=== Sandal Cave ===
Named for the Roman sandal that was the first artifact discovered there during the 1993 "scroll Operation". The karstic cave was discovered about 300 meters from the large cave complex during the survey. The cave contained remains of at least 18 people, nine of whom were found in secondary burials dating to the Chalcolithic and Early Bronze Ages, along with three pottery vessels. Nine skeletons are believed to be of fighters from the Bar Kokhba revolt period who hid there. Other items include characteristic pottery such as oil lamps, cooking pots, storage vessels, coins, leather sandals, glassware fragments, papyrus scroll pieces in Greek, and jewelry, including two gold rings, an earring, a silver spoon, and 26 coins.

=== Large Cave Complex ===
This complex served as a residence through multiple periods, beginning in the Chalcolithic and Early Bronze Ages. Due to frequent reuse, artifacts discovered here are minimal.

== Legacy ==
An account of Christ's Temptation under the name "Mount Quarantania" forms part of Henry Wadsworth Longfellow's poem Christus: A Mystery.

== Alternative locations of biblical site ==
The "high mountain" of the biblical narrative has sometimes been identified with other locations in Roman Judaea. A local Arab tradition placed it as late as the 19th century at the lower peak of 'Ushsh el-Ghurab at the northern end of the Jericho Plain, separated from the Mount of Temptation by the valley known as Wadi ed-Duyuk. Another tradition recorded in Ernoul's 13th-century chronicle placed the Devil's offer of dominion over the kingdoms of the world at Mount Precipice just south of Nazareth, where Jesus was separately said to have disappeared from a crowd during one of his rejections by the Jewish community of his time.

== See also ==
- Jericho
- Monastery of the Temptation
- Tell es-Sultan

Hasmonean desert fortresses

- Alexandreion/Alexandrion/Alexandrium
- Cypros (fortress)
- Hyrcania (fortress)
- Machaerus
