= Daniel R. Schwartz =

Scholar of Second Temple period Jewish history

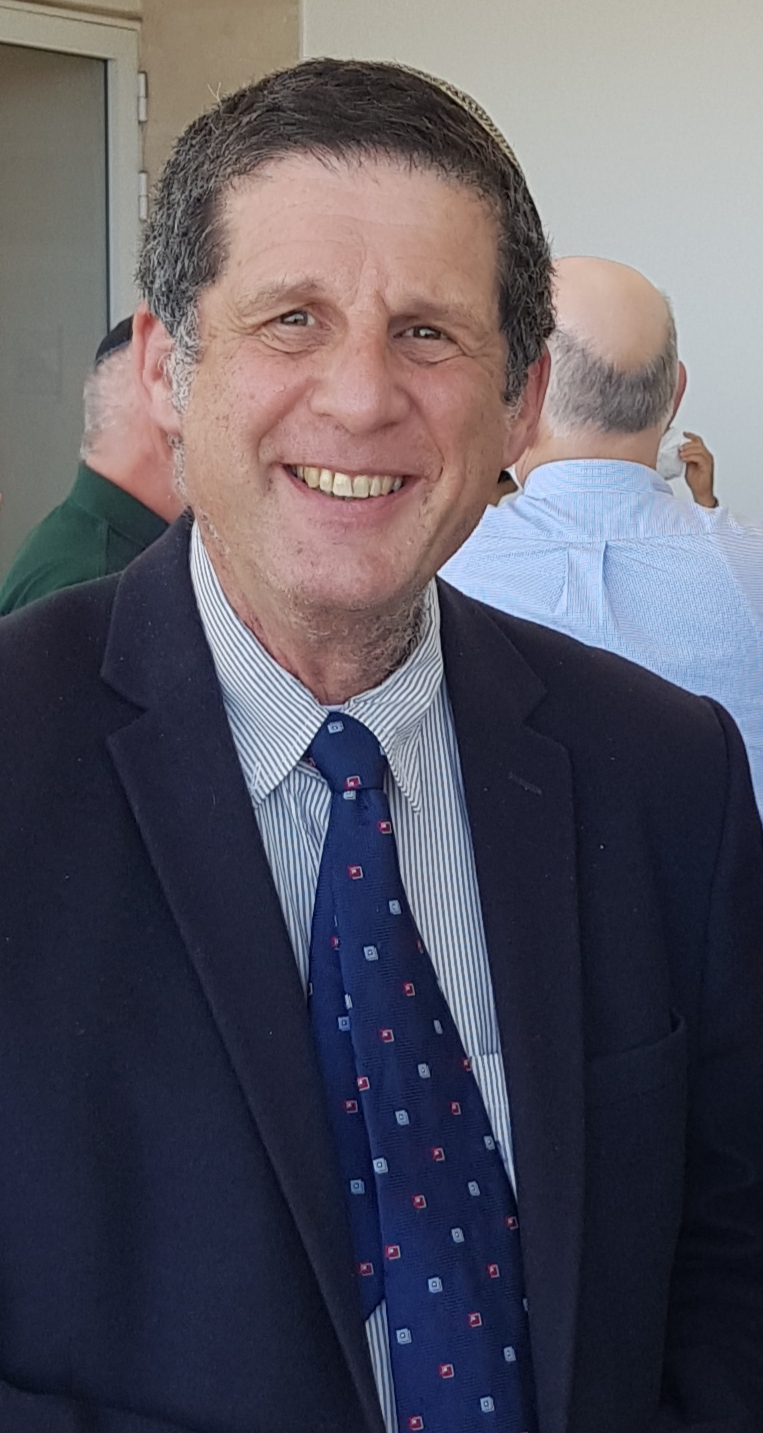
Daniel R. Schwartz in 2022

Daniel R. Schwartz (Hebrew: דניאל שוורץ; born 1952) is a professor of Jewish History at the Hebrew University of Jerusalem. He is a scholar of Hellenistic Judaism, Flavius Josephus, the Second Temple Period, and the book 2 Maccabees.

== Background ==
Daniel Schwartz was born in the United States in 1952. He immigrated to Israel (aliyah) in 1971. He earned a Ph.D in Jewish History from the Hebrew University of Jerusalem in 1980, studying under Menahem Stern. He chaired the university's Department of Jewish History between the years 1992 and 1994. He became full professor in 1995. Schwartz served on the Committee for the Itzhak Ben-Zvi Award of the Yad Itzhak Ben-Zvi Institute. In 2011 he was appointed academic head of the Scholion Interdisciplinary Research Center in Jewish Studies.

== Works ==
Schwartz published the book Agrippa I in 1987 in Hebrew on Herod Agrippa, the last king of the Herodian dynasty. The book won the 1988 Arnold Wischnitzer Prize. It received a translation into English in 1990. Aryeh Kasher of Tel Aviv University, whose review of Agrippa I includes numerous disagreements with Schwartz, describes the biography as "an impressive work full of original and stimulating ideas."

After the murder of Menahem Stern in 1989, Schwartz was called upon to edit various drafts and fragments that Stern had been in the process of writing. Stern had intended to produce a multivolume survey of Jewish history in the Second Temple period. The result was published in 1995 as Hasmonean Judea in the Hellenistic World: Chapters in Political History (Jerusalem: Zalman Shazar Center).

Schwartz wrote 2 Maccabees, a scholarly commentary and annotated translation into Hebrew of the book 2 Maccabees (which only survived in Koine Greek). It was published in Hebrew in 2004, followed by a translation into English in 2008. Schwartz's book is considered one of the authoritative modern works on the subject along with Jonathan A. Goldstein's 1983 book on 2 Maccabees.

As a follow-up, Schwartz wrote 1 Maccabees, a scholarly commentary in English on the book 1 Maccabees for the Anchor Yale Bible series. It was published in 2022.

== Awards and honors ==
- Arnold Wischnitzer Prize, 1988
- Féher Prize, 1992
