= Ptolemy son of Abubus =

Governor of Jericho

Ptolemy son of Abubus (Note: Ancient Greek: Πτολεμαῖος ὁ τοῦ Ἀβούβου, romanized: Ptolemaîos ho toû Aboúbou) was an official in the early Hasmonean kingdom which then controlled Judea. According to the book of 1 Maccabees, in 135/4 BC, he served as the governor of Jericho. While High Priest Simon Thassi, Ptolemy’s father-in-law, was visiting, Ptolemy orchestrated the murder of Simon and two of his sons, as well as some of Simon's servants. This act of betrayal of guest right earned Ptolemy a place in Dante's The Divine Comedy; one of the sections of the ninth layer of hell described in Inferno is called Ptolomea, where those who betray guests in their home suffer.

== Primary sources ==
The only sources that survived from antiquity describing Ptolemy are the book of 1 Maccabees and Josephus's Jewish Antiquities Book 13, Chapter 7–8. According to these accounts, Ptolemy was the cause of the death of High Priest Simon Thassi despite having married one of Simon's daughters:

Now Ptolemy son of Abubus had been appointed governor over the plain of Jericho; he had a large store of silver and gold, for he was son-in-law of the high priest. His heart was lifted up; he determined to get control of the country, and made treacherous plans against Simon and his sons, to do away with them. Now Simon was visiting the towns of the country and attending to their needs, and he went down to Jericho with his sons Mattathias and Judas, in the one hundred and seventy-seventh year (135 BC), in the eleventh month, which is the month of Shebat. The son of Abubus received them treacherously in the little stronghold called Dok, which he had built; he gave them a great banquet, and hid men there. When Simon and his sons were drunk, Ptolemy and his men rose up, took their weapons, rushed in against Simon in the banqueting-hall and killed him and his two sons, as well as some of his servants. So he committed an act of great treachery and returned evil for good.

Then Ptolemy wrote a report about these things and sent it to the king, asking him to send troops to aid him and to turn over to him the towns and the country. He sent other troops to Gazara to do away with John; he sent letters to the captains asking them to come to him so that he might give them silver and gold and gifts; and he sent other troops to take possession of Jerusalem and the temple hill. But someone ran ahead and reported to John at Gazara that his father and brothers had perished, and that 'he has sent men to kill you also.' When he heard this, he was greatly shocked; he seized the men who came to destroy him and killed them, for he had found out that they were seeking to destroy him.

— 1 Maccabees 16:11-22 (NRSV)

The year 177 of the Seleucid era during the month of Shevat would correspond to about February 135 BC, although others suggest it corresponds to February 134 BC. The text leaves unclear who originally appointed Ptolemy, although by the time the account is set he is clearly a member of Simon's administration, and one who has grown wealthy by his association with Simon. Ptolemy sought to launch a coup and take power for himself. After killing the High Priest and either killing or taking captive two of his sons, Ptolemy appealed to king of the Seleucid Empire Antiochus VII Sidetes (reigned 138 to 129 BC) to take his side. The succession crisis would allow him to be recognized as the new governor (ethnarch) of Judea by the Seleucids, who still maintained a suzerain-type relationship with the nascent Judean state. His marriage with a Hasmonean would have given him at least a partial claim to power. If this was his plan, then his assassins failing to kill Simon's remaining son John Hyrcanus and being executed themselves foiled it. According to Josephus, Ptolemy attempted to enter Jerusalem to take command but was thrown out by the hostile populace who had already acclaimed John as the new High Priest. He retreated to a fortress of his called Dagon by Josephus, which may have been the same as the Dok referred to in 1 Maccabees. There he was besieged by John and his armies. Somehow, Ptolemy took John Hyrcanus's mother (presumably also Simon's wife) captive, perhaps because she was with the entourage during the ambush. John's siege was unsuccessful, but Ptolemy decided to flee regardless, spitefully executed Hyrcanus's mother, and was forced into exile. He fled to Rabbath-Ammon, also known as Philadelphia. After that, his fate is unrecorded.

One notable difference between the two accounts is the timing of the deaths of Simon's other sons Judas and Mattathias, two potential successors to the throne. According to 1 Maccabees, they too were killed by Ptolemy during the ambush. According to Josephus, they were instead taken captive, and only perished after the warfare between John Hyrcanus and Ptolemy. Daniel R. Schwartz prefers Josephus's version as more likely to be historically accurate; his argument is that the version in 1 Maccabees is politically convenient for John, leaving him blameless in failing to successfully ransom his brothers, as 1 Maccabees writes they were already dead anyway.

== In culture ==
Ptolemy is perhaps most famous for a reference to him in Dante Alighieri's The Divine Comedy. In Inferno, the ninth and deepest layer of hell is for the sin of treachery, which Dante saw as the gravest of all crimes. Inhabitants include Satan, Judas Iscariot, and Cain. The ninth layer is further subdivided into four sections by the type of treachery: Caina, Antenora, Ptolomea, and Judecca. In Canto 33, Fra Alberigo is tortured in the third section, Ptolomea (Italian: Tolomea), a place in hell designated for traitors against guests in their home. While Ptolemy is not directly mentioned, he is presumably punished in the section named after him (similar to how Cain resides in Caina and Judas in Judecca) for his betrayal of Simon and his entourage while they were his guests.
