= DOK =

DOK or Dok may refer to:

- Danube–Oder Canal, a planned and partially constructed artificial waterway in eastern Europe
- DOK, code for Donetsk International Airport
- Dok (fortress), an ancient fortification on the Mount of Temptation near Jericho
- DOK (TV series), a Swiss documentary television series
- Dok Leipzig, a documentary festival in Leipzig, Germany
- John Hager (cartoonist) (1858-1932), cartoonist, known as "Dok"
- Dok, a large onggi, or Korean earthenware jar
