= Aryeh Kasher =

Aryeh Kasher (Hebrew: אריה כשר; 1935 – October 26, 2011) was an Israeli academic and writer. He was a professor at Tel Aviv University and winner of the 1990 Bialik Prize for Hebrew literature.

== His life and his research activity ==
Kasher grew up in Kfar Vitkin, where he graduated from elementary school and high school. In his youth he wrote the radio feuilleton "Hilik Haviv" with his childhood friends and classmates Gad Yaacobi (later a government minister and member of the Knesset) and Micha Gisser (later professor of economics at the University of New Mexico in Albuquerque, New Mexico). In the Israeli army, he served at the Nahal.

He began his history teaching in Emek Hefer regional school in the early 1960s. He received a MA from Tel Aviv University—the subject of his thesis, completed in 1966, was history background and messianism in Assumption of Moses.

Kasher received his PhD in Jewish studies from Tel Aviv University in 1973. The dissertation subject was "The jurisric-political class and the rights system of the Jews of Egypt in the Hellenistic period and the Roman Principate". His advisor was Shimon Applebaum. Joshua Efron taught him and influenced his work.

Kasher taught Jewish history in Tel Aviv University for many years and led the Center for the Study of Israel and its Settlements at Tel Aviv University, affiliated to Yad Yitzhak Ben-Zvi Institute. He retired in 2005.

His speciality was the history of the Jews and Land of Israel during the Second Temple period.

== Awards ==
In 1990, Kasher was the co-recipient (jointly with Menachem Dorman) of the Bialik Prize for Jewish thought.

== His books ==
=== Jews, Idumaeans and Ancient Arabs ===
His book deals with two major subjects: first, the Idumeans Judaizing, located in Idumea and the Yturs in the Galilee and their integrating in the Jewish society. The Judaizing action describe in the Hellenistic Historiography as an act of compulsion by the Hasmonean, in order to abase their name. Kasher argues that the judaising conducted out of good will and cooperation of the nations who judaized with the Hasmonean. He examines the consequences of the Hellenistic influence in the Idumean society, and its implications on their relations with the neighbor Jewish nation, even though in the Bible the Idumean accused in co-operation with Babylon power and the ruin of Jerusalem and the temple in the year 586 BCE. The second part of the book deals with the Nabataeans relations with the Jews from 332 BCE to 70 AD. The relations start with great friendship in the beginning of the Hashmonean period and ends in the Alexander Jannaeus wars and the Roman rule. It is a pioneering monographic research, that was held in the first time by Aryeh Kasher. till his research historians used to study specially the Jewish People and the regime that conquer the country and hardly look for the non Jewish Israel country inhabitants. This because we hardly have national history papers of this nations authors, the archeological finding about them is scarce and the majority of the knowledge we have is from Josephus, who describe them through their relations with the Jewish people.

=== Kenaan, Paleshet, Yavan ve-Yisrael ===
The book describes the history of the Jews relating to their relations with the Hellenistic cities in Israel country, in chronological order, during the period from the country conquest by Alexander the Great till the end of the big revolt against the Romans. The Jews saw the citizens of the Hellenistic cities as the heirs of Canaan and the Philistines from the Biblical period, whom the Hasmonean try to distinct, in the spirit of the Biblians saying. with all that accompany political, economical and cultural rival, that gather strength since the Hellenistic period.

=== King Herod: A Persecuted Persecutor ===
Pioneers research about Herod the Great. Psychological biography about in collaborate with the psychiatrist professor Eliezer Witztum. The book stands as an antithesis to Avraham Shalit: Herod the Great: the man and his deed, third edition, Bialik Institute, 1964. In this book Shalit describe Herod as king that contribute a great deal to the Jewish People due to his monumental building enterprises. Kasher choose in his study to another aspect in Herod personality: his murderousness and interpret him as suffer from a paranoid illness. Kasher's research based on Josephus's writing as a main source of knowledge. He was assisted by professor Witztum that using the psychological research tools in order to decipher the complex personality of Herod and diagnose his illness as inferiority complex, a man that murder his closest relatives and anyone who he suspect by the least sign of treason, including his wife and three sons. The manuscript of the book won the Bahat Prize given for distinguished reference books by the University of Haifa in 2006.

== List of published works ==
- Kasher, Aryeh. (in collaboration with Witztum, Eliezer). King Herod: A Persecuted Persecutor. A Case Study in Psychohistory and Psychobiography. Walter de Gruyter, Berlin-New York, March 2007.
- Kasher Aryeh. Jews and Hellenistic cities in Eretz-Israel: relations of the Jews in Eretz-Israel with the Hellenistic cities during the second Temple Period (332 BCE-70ce). Tübingen: J.C.B. Mohr, 1990.
- Kasher A., Rappaport U., Fux G. (editors). Greece and Rome in Eretz Israel: collected essays. Jerusalem: Yad Itzhak Ben-Zvi, 1990.
- Kasher, Aryeh. Jews, Idumaeans, and ancient Arabs: relations of the Jews in Eretz-Israel with the nations of the frontier and the desert during the Hellenistic and Roman era (332 BCE-70 CE). Tübingen: J.C.B. Mohr, 1988.
- Kasher, Aryeh. The Jews in Hellenistic and Roman Egypt: the struggle for equal rights. Tübingen: J.C.B. Mohr, 1985.

== See also ==
- List of Bialik Prize recipients
