= An-Nuway'imah =

Village in Jericho Governorate, West Bank

an-Nuway'imah
- Municipality type D (Village council)

Arabic transcription(s)
  - Arabic: النويعمه
  - Latin: an-Nuwei'ma (official) al-Nuwayimah (unofficial)
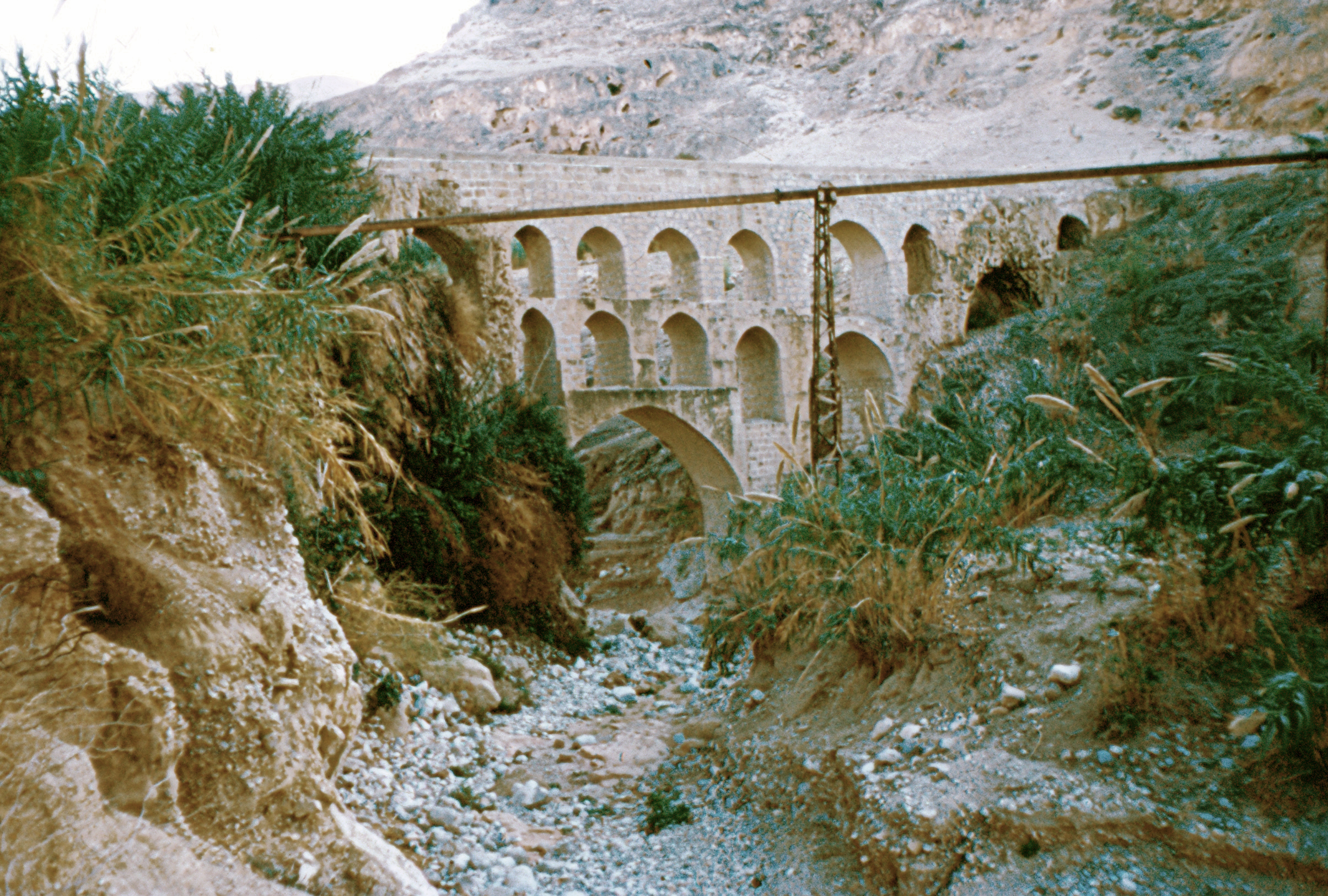

- Location of an-Nuway'imah within Palestine
- Coordinates: 31°53′23″N 35°26′40″E
- Palestine grid: 190/144
- State: State of Palestine
- Governorate: Jericho

Government
  - Type: Village council

Area
  - Total: 52.6 km^{2} (20.3 sq mi)

Population (2017)
  - Total: 1,794
  - Density: 34.1/km^{2} (88.3/sq mi)
- Name meaning: Ain en Nueiameh=The spring of the soft soil

al-Nuway'imah (Arabic: النويعمه) is a Palestinian village in the Jericho Governorate in the eastern West Bank, located five kilometers north of Jericho. It is situated in a low elevation below sea level in the central Jordan Valley. The village contains one primary and secondary school.

== History ==
An-Nuway'imah, like the rest of Palestine, was incorporated into the Ottoman Empire in 1517, and in the census of 1596, the village was located in the Nahiya of Quds of the Liwa of Quds. The population was 33 households, all Muslim. The villagers paid a fixed tax rate of 33.3% on various agricultural products, such as wheat, barley, summer crops, goats and/or beehives, water buffaloes, in addition to "occasional revenues"; a total of 5,800 akçe.

In 1883, the PEF's Survey of Western Palestine noted the spring and the aqueduct at An-Nuway'imah.

=== British Mandate era ===
In the 1922 census of Palestine conducted by the British Mandate authorities, Nweimeh, together with Al-Auja and ad-Duyuk had a population of 332; 322 Muslims and 10 Christians, where the Christians were 7 Orthodox, and 3 Syrian Catholic.

In the 1931 census Nu'eima had a population of 179 Muslims, in 43 houses.

In the 1945 statistics, the village's population was 240 Muslims and it had jurisdiction over 52,600 dunams of land. Of this, 117 dunams were for citrus and bananas, 1,157 dunams were for plantations and irrigable land, 728 for cereals, while a total of 50,614 dunams were non-cultivable areas.

=== Jordanian era ===
In the wake of the 1948 Arab–Israeli War, and after the 1949 Armistice Agreements, An-Nuway'imah came under Jordanian rule. It was annexed by Jordan in 1950.

=== Post-1967 ===
Since the Six-Day War in 1967, An-Nuway'imah has been under Israeli occupation.

In 1979, Israel confiscated 5,048 dunams of land from the village, in order to construct the Israeli settlement of Na'omi.

After the 1995 accords, 12.5% of the land of An Nuwei’ma was classified as Area A, the remaining 87.5% as Area C.

According to the Palestinian Central Bureau of Statistics, it had a population of approximately 1,170 in mid-year 2006.

An-Nuway'imah is one of the few villages in the Jordan Valley that has access to spring water. The nearby spring is key to the economy of the village, as it relies on agriculture as a main source of income and food. The most widely-grown crops are bananas and vegetables. Previously, the water from Wadi Nuway'imah was channeled through open pipes which were vulnerable to contamination and water loss but the American Near East Refugee Aid has undergone a $233,000 project to protect the pipes. Today, the spring channels water to the village through enclosed and buried pipes and is used for multiple purposes.

== Bibliography ==
- Barron, J.B., ed. (1923). Palestine: Report and General Abstracts of the Census of 1922. Government of Palestine.
- Conder, C.R.; Kitchener, H.H. (1883). The Survey of Western Palestine: Memoirs of the Topography, Orography, Hydrography, and Archaeology. Vol. 3. London: Committee of the Palestine Exploration Fund.
- Government of Palestine, Department of Statistics (1945). Village Statistics, April, 1945.
- Hadawi, S. (1970). Village Statistics of 1945: A Classification of Land and Area ownership in Palestine. Palestine Liberation Organization Research Center. Archived from the original on 2018-12-08.
- Hütteroth, W.-D.; Abdulfattah, K. (1977). Historical Geography of Palestine, Transjordan and Southern Syria in the Late 16th Century. Erlanger Geographische Arbeiten, Sonderband 5. Erlangen, Germany: Vorstand der Fränkischen Geographischen Gesellschaft. ISBN 3-920405-41-2.
- Mills, E., ed. (1932). Census of Palestine 1931. Population of Villages, Towns and Administrative Areas. Jerusalem: Government of Palestine.
- Palmer, E.H. (1881). The Survey of Western Palestine: Arabic and English Name Lists Collected During the Survey by Lieutenants Conder and Kitchener, R. E. Transliterated and Explained by E.H. Palmer. Committee of the Palestine Exploration Fund.
- Toledano, E. (1984). "The Sanjaq of Jerusalem in the Sixteenth Century: Aspects of Topography and Population". Archivum Ottomanicum. 9: 279–319.
