= Uriel Rappaport =

Israeli historian (1935–2019)

Uriel Rappaport (Hebrew: אוריאל רפפורט; 1935 – 20 December 2019) was an Israeli historian. His area of research focus was the Second Temple period (6th century BCE – 1st century CE), including Hellenistic Judaism, the Maccabean Revolt, the Hasmonean kingdom, and the First Jewish–Roman War. He became a professor of Jewish History at the University of Haifa and served as a rector of the university from 1983 to 1985. He was a member of the Council for Higher Education in Israel in 1987–1989 and 1998–2001, and served as a chairman of the Humanities Committee at the Israel Science Foundation. Rappaport took emeritus status at Haifa in 2003, and served as president of Kinneret College in 2002–2006.

== Biography ==
Uriel Rappaport was born in 1935 in Tel Aviv (then part of Mandatory Palestine) and grew up in Netanya. He attended the Hebrew University of Jerusalem for his education, where he acquired degrees in both History and Jewish History. He earned his master's degree in 1962. He taught part-time at Hebrew Reali School in Haifa and at the branch of Hebrew University in Haifa. Continuing his studies at Hebrew University, he acquired a PhD in 1965 with Abraham Schalit as his advisor, an expert on the Second Temple period. He studied for a post-doctorate at the École pratique des hautes études (EPHE) in Paris under Louis Robert, an expert in Greek epigraphy, and Georges Le Rider, a scholar of Hellenistic numismatics.

When he returned to Israel, he became one of the first instructors at the University of Haifa, which was initially a branch of the Hebrew University in 1963–1972. In 1972, he was elected the second dean (after Professor Akiva Gilboa) of the Faculty of Humanities at the University of Haifa. In the years 1983-1986 he served as rector of Haifa University. He spent time as a visiting professor at Temple University in Philadelphia, Pennsylvania; at the Center for Advanced Hebrew Studies in Wolfson College at Oxford University; and at the Israel Institute for Advanced Studies, on the campus of his alma mater, the Hebrew University of Jerusalem (1995–1996). He took emeritus status at Haifa in 2003. He served as president of Kinneret College in the Northern District from 2002 to 2006.

In addition to his academic work, Rappaport served on a number of education-related commissions and committees. He was a member of the Council for Higher Education in Israel in 1987–1989 and 1998–2001, and served as a chairman of the Humanities Committee at the Israel Science Foundation.

In his personal life, he was married and had three children. Rappaport died in December 2019, and was buried in the kibbutz Neve Yam's cemetery.

== Work ==
Rappaport was a historian of the Second Temple period, when Judea was under first Persian control, then that of various Greek states, then the Hasmonean kingdom, and then the Romans. In particular, one of his areas of focus was relations between Jews and non-Jews in the region, such as Samaritans and Greeks, as well as Greek influence on the Jews themselves in Hellenistic Judaism. He also studied times when those tensions boiled over into conflict, notably the Maccabean Revolt (177–141 BCE), the Great Revolt (66–73 CE), and the Bar Kochba Revolt (141–144). Rappaport wrote for a variety of audiences: both a textbook aimed for high schoolers written with Israel Shatzman that was reprinted many times for a popular audience, as well as many scholarly articles and books. He also translated various works, both Hebrew to English and English to Hebrew, including a work of Victor Tcherikover's on the History of the Jews in Egypt in 1974. His 2006 book on John of Giscala won the Yaacov Bahat award for outstanding non-fiction book, an award from the University of Haifa aimed at books for an academic audience.

== Selected works ==
Rappaport's major books include:

- בית חשמונאי: עם ישראל בארץ ישראל בימי החשמונאים ,יד יצחק בן-צבי, ירושלים, תשע"ג 2013. (The House of the Hasmoneans: The people of Israel in Eretz Israel during the Hasmonean era)
- יוחנן מגוש חלב: מהרי הגליל אל חומות ירושלים, מרכז זלמן שזר, ירושלים, תשס"ז 2006. (John of Gischala: From the Mountains of Galilee to the Walls of Jerusalem)
- מכורש עד אלכסנדר: תולדות ישראל בשלטון פרס, בהשתתפות שלומית ירון (עריכה וריכוז הפיתוח: ישראל רונן), האוניברסיטה הפתוחה, רעננה, תשס"ה 2004. (From Cyrus to Alexander: The History of Israel under Persian rule)
- ספר מקבים א': מבוא, תרגום ופירוש, יד יצחק בן-צבי, ירושלים, תשס"ד 2004. (The Book 1 Maccabees: Introduction, Translation, and Commentary. Co-authored with Daniel R. Schwartz.)
- יהודה ורומא: מירידת בית חשמונאי עד רבי יהודה הנשיא, (ראש צוות הקורס), מהדורה ב', האוניברסיטה הפתוחה, תל אביב, תשנ"ח 1998 - תשנ"ט 1999. (Judah and Rome: From the Hasmonean dynasty to Rabbi Judah ha-Nasi. 1st edition in 1982, 2nd edition in 1998–1999, 3rd edition in 2016.)
- מגלות לקוממיות: מגלות בבל עד ירידת בית חשמונאי (מהדורה ב', 12 יחידות לימוד), האוניברסיטה הפתוחה, תל אביב, תש"ן - תשנ"ב. (Exiles to Communes: From the Babylonian Exile to the Fall of the House of the Hasmoneans)
- האנציקלופדיה לתולדות ארץ ישראל: מאורעות, מונחים, מקומות ואישים מהתקופה הפרהיסטורית ועד מלחמת העולם הראשונה (1914), בהשתתפות יואל רפל, הוצאת מודן, תל אביב, 1986. (The Encyclopedia of the History of the Land of Israel: Events, Terms, Places and Persons from the Prehistoric Period to the First World War (1914))
- תולדות ישראל בתקופת הבית השני, ספר עזר לתלמידי הכיתות העליונות של בית הספר התיכון, לנבחנים בבחינות-בגרות חיצוניות, לסטודנטים, למורים ולקורא המשכיל, מהדורה ג', מעובדת ומסודרת מחדש. הוצאת עמיחי, תל אביב, 1984 (מהדורה ראשונה יצאה לאור בתשכ"ז). (History of Israel during the Second Temple Period)
- דניאל, סדרת "עולם התנ"ך", בהשתתפות פרופ' יצחק אבישור, הוצאת רביבים, תל אביב, תשמ"ג 1983. (Daniel, part of the "World of the Bible" series)

Rappaport has edited various articles and journals, including the compilation books:

- 1982: יוסף בן מתתיהו : היסטוריון של ארץ־ישראל בתקופה ההלניסטית והרומית : קובץ מחקרים (Flavius Josephus: Historian of Eretz Israel in the Hellenistic and Roman periods)
- 1992: Dimant, Devorah, and Rappaport, Uriel (eds.), The Dead Sea Scrolls: Forty Years of Research, Leiden and Jerusalem: E.J. Brill, Magnes Press, Yad Izhak Ben-Zvi.
- 1993/1994: מדינת החשמונאים : לתולדותיה על רקע התקופה ההלניסטית : קובץ מאמרים (The Hasmonean State: Its History Against the Background of the Hellenistic Period)

Upon his retirement, a festschrift was published in his honor in 2005:

- 2005 לאוריאל; מחקרים בתולדות ישראל בעת העתיקה מוגשים לאוריאל רפפורט (For Uriel: Studies of the History of Israel in Antiquity, submitted to Uriel Rapaport).
