= Jonathan A. Goldstein =

Biblical scholar (1929–2004)

- Born: 1929
- Died: 2004 (aged 74–75); Iowa City, Iowa
- Occupation: Academic

Academic background
- Education: Jewish Theological Seminary, Harvard University
- Alma mater: Columbia University (Ph.D.)

Academic work
- Discipline: Biblical studies
- Institutions: Columbia University; University of Iowa
- Notable works: I Maccabees, II Maccabees (AYB)

Jonathan A. Goldstein (1929–2004) was a biblical scholar and author who wrote for the Anchor Bible Series. He was the author of books on I Maccabees and II Maccabees, as well as a book about competing religions in the ancient world.

Goldstein studied at the Jewish Theological Seminary and earned a bachelor's degree and master's degree at Harvard University. He then earned a doctorate from Columbia University and taught history there for two years. He then taught at the University of Iowa from 1962 to 1997, and lived in Iowa City until his death in 2004.

== Bibliography ==
- I Maccabees. Anchor Yale Bible. Doubleday. 1976. ISBN 0-385-08533-8.
- II Maccabees. Anchor Yale Bible. Doubleday. 1983. ISBN 0-385-04864-5.
- Semites, Iranians, Greeks, and Romans: Studies in Their Interactions. 1990. ISBN 1-55540-512-6.
- The Jews of China. 2000. ISBN 0-7656-0443-4.
- Peoples of an Almighty God: Competing Religions in the Ancient World. 2002. ISBN 0-385-42347-0.

== See also ==
- Anchor Bible Series
- I Maccabees
- II Maccabees
- The Temple Scroll
