= Simon Thassi =

High Priest of Israel, founder of the Hasmonean dynasty

- High Priest of Jerusalem
- An imaginary depiction of Simon Thassi from Guillaume Rouillé's Promptuarii Iconum Insigniorum (1553)

Leader of the Maccabees
- Reign: 142–135 BCE
- Predecessor: Jonathan Apphus
- Successor: John Hyrcanus

Prince of Judaea
- Reign: 141-135 BCE
- Successor: John Hyrcanus I

High Priest of Judaea
- Reign: 141-135 BCE
- Predecessor: Jonathan Apphus
- Successor: John Hyrcanus I
- Born: 184 BCE; Judea, Seleucid Empire
- Died: February 135 BCE; Dok
- Spouse: name unknown
- Issue: John Hyrcanus I Mattathias II; Judas II
- Dynasty: Hasmonean
- Father: Mattathias
- Religion: Hellenistic Judaism

Simon Thassi (Hebrew: שִׁמְעוֹן הַתַּסִּי Šīməʿōn haTassī; died 135 BC) was a Jewish leader of the Hasmonean dynasty, serving as high priest, military commander, and ruler of Judea. The second son of the Hasmonean patriarch Mattathias and one of the Maccabean brothers, he assumed leadership after his brother Jonathan Apphus was captured by the Seleucid general Diodotus Tryphon. Simon played a central role in consolidating Hasmonean rule: he strengthened Judea's fortifications, expelled the Seleucid garrison from Jerusalem, and expanded Jewish settlement, laying the foundation for the Hasmonean state. His rule marked the beginning of effective Jewish independence.

Simon assumed leadership in 143 BCE, completing Jerusalem's fortifications and securing key areas, including Gezer and the port city of Jaffa, where he stationed Jewish garrisons and settled Jewish inhabitants. He defended Judea from Tryphon's forces and recovered his brother Jonathan’s body for burial at Modi'in. Simon consolidated Judea's independence, cultivated relations with Rome, Sparta, and the Seleucid Empire, and was granted rights such as tax exemption and coinage, though he may not have used them. In 142/141 BCE, he captured the Acra fortress in Jerusalem, removing the last remaining Hellenistic presence in the city. A public assembly formalized his rule as high priest, military commander, and national leader of the Jews, with hereditary succession in his family "until a new prophet should arise."

Simon was assassinated in 134 BCE at the fortress of Dok near Jericho by his son-in-law Ptolemy ben Abubus. His third son, John Hyrcanus, escaped and succeeded him, continuing the Hasmonean dynasty and expanding Judea's borders.

== Names ==
Hasmonean dynasty family tree

The name "Thassi" has a connotation of "the Wise", a title which can also mean "the Director", "the Guide", "the Man of Counsel", and "the Zealous". This Simon is also sometimes distinguished as Simon the Hasmonean, Simon Maccabee, or (from Latin) Simon Maccabeus.

== History ==
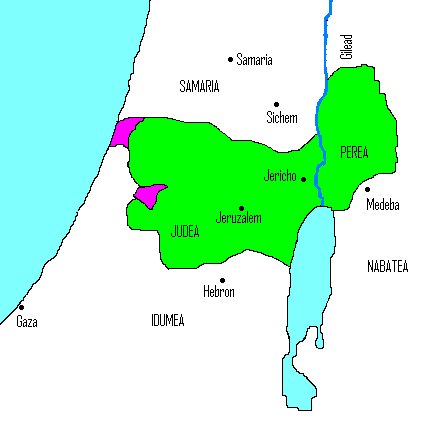
Hasmonean Kingdom under Simon Maccabaeus situation in 143 bc area expanded

Simon took a prominent part in the Maccabean Revolt against the Seleucid Empire led by his brothers, Judas Maccabaeus and Jonathan Apphus. The successes of the Jews rendered it expedient for the Seleucid leaders in Syria to show them special favour. Therefore, Antiochus VI appointed Simon strategos, or military commander, of the coastal region stretching from the Ladder of Tyre to Egypt. As strategos, Simon gained control of the cities of Beth-zur and Joppa, garrisoning them with Jewish troops, and built the fortress of Adida.

After the capture of Jonathan by the Seleucid general Diodotus Tryphon, Simon was elected leader by the people, assembled at Jerusalem. He at once completed the fortification of the capital, and made Joppa secure. Archaeologist Dvir Raviv associates the construction of the Artabba fortress with Simon and places it within the Ramathaim toparchy.

At Hadid he blocked the advance of Tryphon, who was attempting to enter the country and seize the throne of Syria. Realizing he could gain nothing by force, Tryphon demanded a ransom for Jonathan and for the release of Jonathan's sons as hostages. Although Simon was aware that Tryphon would deceive him, both Josephus and 1 Maccabees state that he acceded to both demands so that the people might see that he had done everything possible for his brother. Jonathan was nevertheless assassinated, and the hostages were not returned. Simon thus became the sole leader of the people.

As an opponent of Diodotus Tryphon, Simon decided to side with the Seleucid king, Demetrius II, to whom he sent a deputation requesting freedom from taxation for the country. The fact that his request was granted implied recognition of the political independence of Judea in the year 142 BCE.

In 141 BCE, the Jews themselves issued a public decree at a large assembly "of the priests and the people and of the elders of the land, to the effect that Simon should be their leader and high priest forever, until there should arise a faithful prophet". This when Simon Thassi became High Priest of Judaea and Ethnarch (Prince of Judaea). He was the first prince of the Hasmonean dynasty, reigning from 141 to 134 BCE. Recognition of the new dynasty by the Roman Republic was accorded by the Senate about 139 BCE, when the delegation representing Simon was in Rome. Simon had made the Jewish people semi-independent of the Seleucid Empire.

In 134 BCE, Simon and his two sons Mattathias and Judah were assassinated at a banquet at Dok by his son-in-law Ptolemy, the Seleucid governor at Jericho; Simon was the last of the Maccabees to 'die with his boots on'. Simon's third son John Hyrcanus succeeded him as high priest and ruler of Judea but was unable to capture Ptolemy, initially because the latter held John's mother hostage, and subsequently because his army disbanded in observance of the custom at the time of resting every seventh year. Under Hyrcanus (134–104 BCE) Jewish independence was finally achieved.

== Legacy ==
Simon (and its Hebrew form, Simeon) would go on to become the most popular male name for some three centuries afterward in both the Hasmonean Kingdom and Roman Judaea. This was both to honor a Jewish hero who had attained independence for the Jewish state, as well as because "Simon" did not sound artificial or strange to Greek ears.

Simon Thassi Hasmonean Dynasty Died: 134 BCE
Jewish titles
Preceded by Jonathan Apphus	Leader of the Maccabees; 142–134 BCE	Title extinct
Preceded by Jonathan Apphus	High Priest of Judaea; 141–134 BCE	Succeeded by John Hyrcanus I
New title Principality declared	Prince of Judaea; 141–134 BCE	Succeeded by John Hyrcanus I
