= Na'aran (Israeli settlement) =

Israeli settlement in the West Bank

Na'aran: נערן (Hebrew)
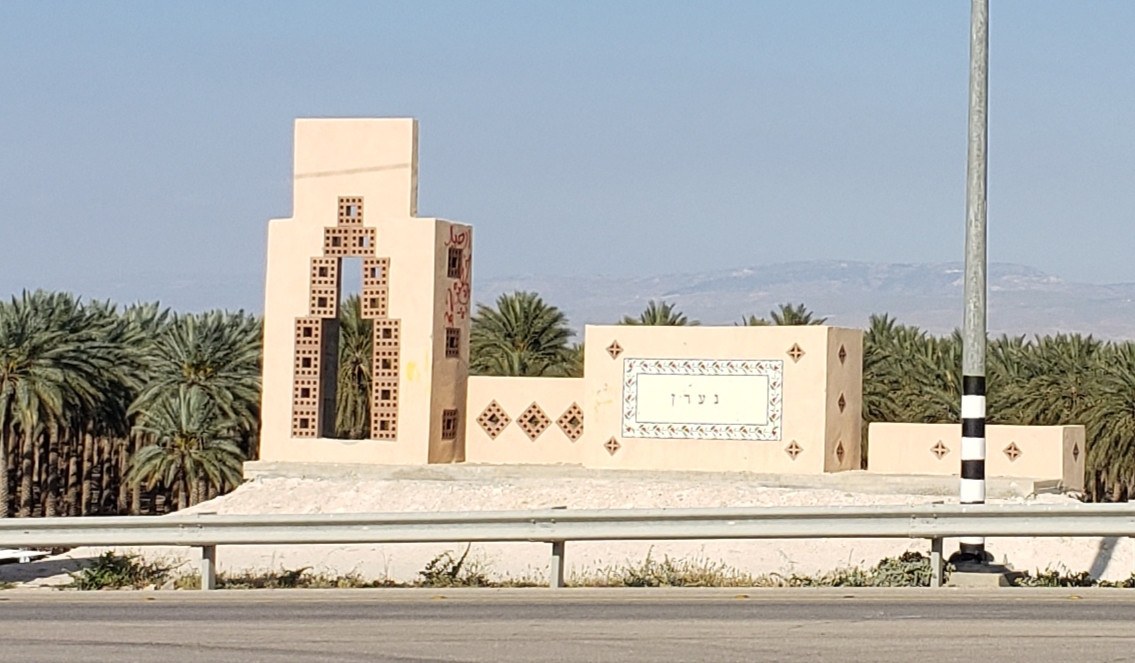

- Location within the Central West Bank
- Coordinates: 31°58′1″N 35°27′16″E
- Country: Palestine
- District: Judea and Samaria Area
- Council: Bik'at HaYarden
- Region: West Bank
- Affiliation: Kibbutz Movement
- Founded: 18 June 1971
- Founder: Nahal
- Population (2024): 155
- Website: www.naaran.org

Na'aran (Hebrew: נערן), formerly known as Niran (נִירָן) is an Israeli settlement organized as a kibbutz in the West Bank. Located in Area C of the Jordan Valley near Jericho, it falls under the jurisdiction of Bik'at HaYarden Regional Council. In 2024 it had a population of 155.

The international community considers Israeli settlements in the West Bank illegal under international law, but the Israeli government disputes this.

== Etymology ==
The settlement was originally named Niran after the biblical city of Naaran. In 2018 it was renamed Na'aran.

== History ==
The settlement was established on 18 June 1971 under the name Niran as a Nahal settlement by the Nahal Command in collaboration with the Agricultural Settlement Department of the Jewish Agency on land prepared by the Jewish National Fund. According to ARIJ, Israel confiscated 497 dunams of land from the Palestinian village of Al-Auja in order to construct the settlement. Niran began its existence as "a tented outpost of a few dozen persons." The barren conditions required that soil be carried up from surrounding valleys to make agriculture viable. During its time as a military outpost, it was used to prevent armed infiltration from Jordan and as a disciplinary assignment for delinquent Israeli soldiers. It was demilitarized and converted to a civilian kibbutz in 1977.

== Culture ==
The kibbutz organizes workshops on Zionism, Judaism and Israeli society. Some members of the kibbutz work in the date groves or at the local plastics factory, P.V.Ran, which manufactures packaging and wrappings for food products in compliance with international standards.
