= Al-Auja, Jericho =

al-Auja
- Municipality type C

Arabic transcription(s)
  - Arabic: العوجا
  - Latin: al-'Auja (official) al-Awja (unofficial)
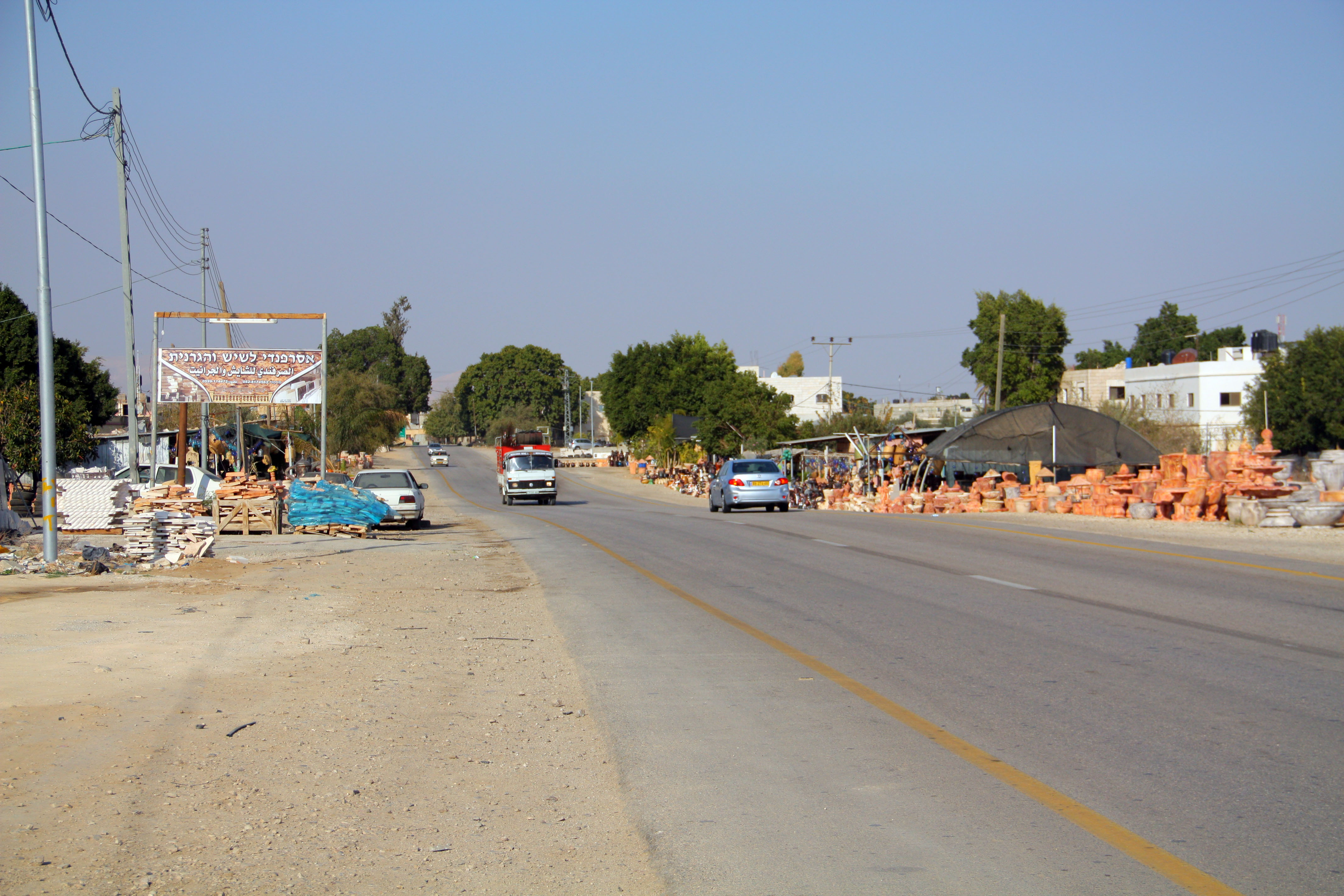
- Southern entrance to al-Auja, 2011

- Location of al-Auja within Palestine
- Coordinates: 31°56′51″N 35°27′42″E
- Palestine grid: 195/150
- State: State of Palestine
- Governorate: Jericho

Government
  - Type: Municipality (from 1994)

Area
  - Total: 107.9 km^{2} (41.7 sq mi)

Population (2017)
  - Total: 5,224
  - Density: 48.42/km^{2} (125.4/sq mi)

Al-Auja (Arabic: العوجا) is a Palestinian town in the Jericho Governorate of the State of Palestine, in the eastern West Bank, located ten kilometers north of Jericho. The town has a total area of 107,905 dunams, however its built-up area comprises only 832 dunams. It is situated 230 meters below sea level.

Agricultural land makes up over 10% of the town's area, mostly planted with bananas, oranges, and vegetables for which al-Auja is well known. Irrigation water is mainly supplied from the al-Auja spring.

The village is divided into an upper (al-'Auja al-Fauqa) and lower (al-'Auja al-Tahta) sections within the broader village territory.

== History ==
Archelais (Khirbet el-Beiyudat), a Herodian town founded by and named after Herod Archelaus, is an archaeological site on the northern outskirts of al-Auja, and is gradually being covered by modern Palestinian construction and devastated by treasure hunters.

The town is built along, and shares the name of, the Wadi al-Auja stream, "al-auja" meaning "the meandering one". This should not be confused with the other river called in Arabic by the same name, Nahr al-Auja, and known by its biblical and Hebrew name as the Yarkon River. During World War I this coincidence led to the term of "the line of the two Aujas" referring to a strategic line connecting the two river valleys.

=== British Mandate era ===
In the 1922 census of Palestine conducted by the British Mandate authorities, Al-Auja, together with ad-Duyuk and Nweimeh had a population of 332; 322 Muslims and 10 Christians, where the Christians were 7 Orthodox, and 3 Syrian Catholic. According to the 1931 census, Al-Auja had a population of 253 Muslims, in 100 houses.

In the 1945 statistics, the village's population was 290, while Arab el Nuseirat had 520, Arab el Kaabina had 260, Arab el Ureinat had 210 and Arab el Saayida had 110 members; a total of 1,390; all Muslims, and together they had jurisdiction over 106,946 dunams of land. Of this, 418 dunams were used for citrus and bananas, 2,822 dunams were for plantations and irrigable land, 6,502 for cereals, while a total of 97,204 dunams were classified as non-cultivable areas.

=== Jordanian era ===
In the wake of the 1948 Arab–Israeli War, and after the 1949 Armistice Agreements, al-Auja came under Jordanian rule. It was annexed by Jordan in 1950.

=== Post 1967 ===
Since the 1967 Six-Day War, al-Auja has been under Israeli occupation. 30,147 dunams of al-Auja's land was classified as "closed-off area" barred from Palestinian use.

According to ARIJ, Israel have confiscated land from Al-Auja in order to construct four Israeli settlements:

- 993 dunams for Nativ HaGdud,
- 499 dunams for Yitav.
- 497 dunams for Na'aran (Niran),
- 268 dunams for Gilgal.

According to the Palestinian Central Bureau of Statistics, al-Auja had a population of over 4,000 inhabitants in mid-year 2006. In 1997, refugees constituted 24.7% of the population. The 15.5% of Al-Auja area which is located in "Area A", was transferred to the Palestinian National Authority in a 1994 deal which also included Jericho and Gaza. The remaining 84.5% of al-Auja is Area C, which remains under total Israeli control.

== Settler attacks ==
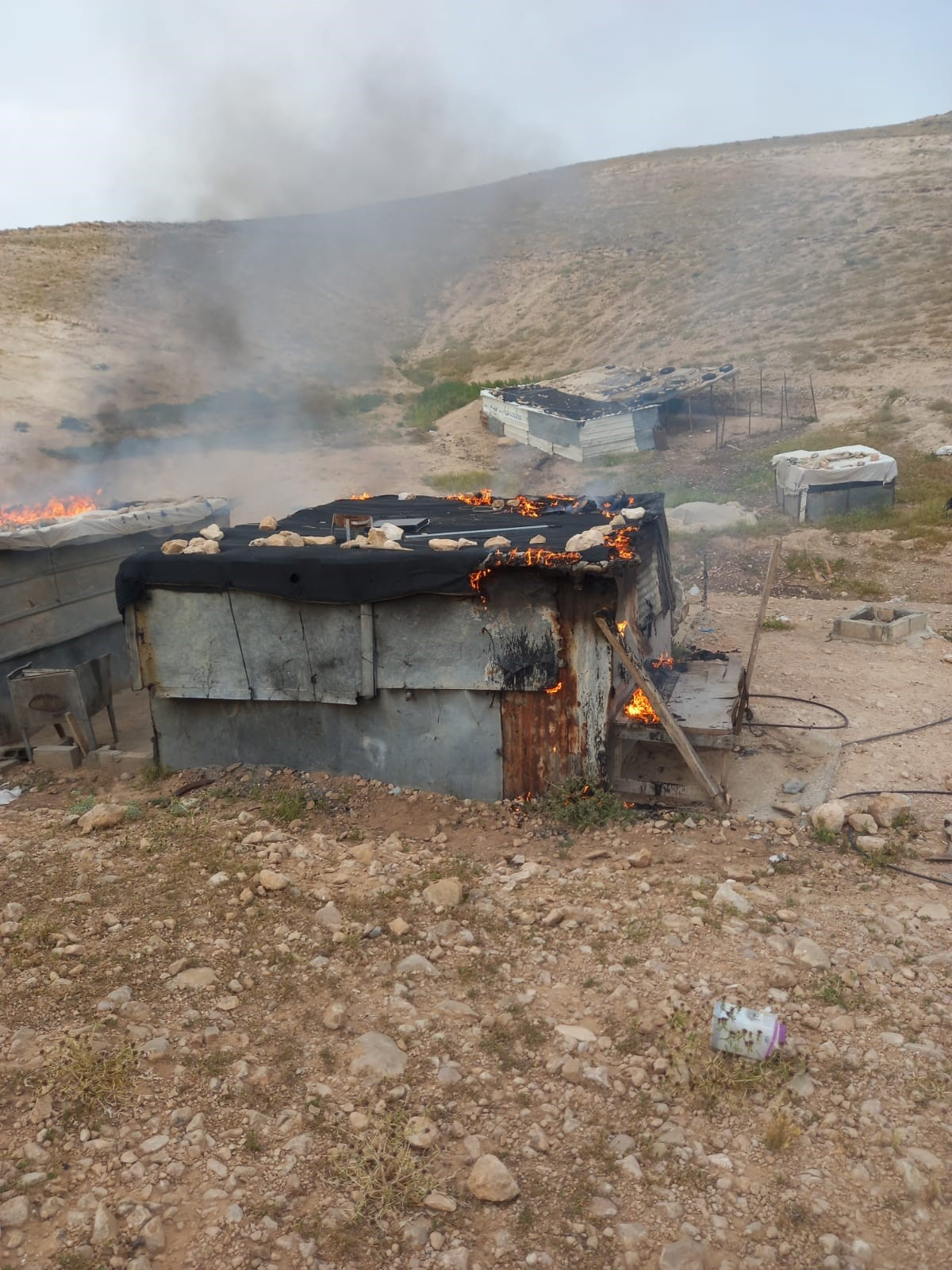
Settler arson attack, Al-Auja, April 2024

The town and the adjacent village of Ras al-Auja are subject to frequent attacks by settlers and military forces. This includes denying access to water sources, pumping which causes local springs to dry up, destruction of houses, confiscation of agricultural equipment, damaging livestock, uprooting of olive and date trees, interference with grazing and violent attacks on Palestinian civilians. In 2024, an illegal outpost was established near Al-Auja from which the settlers and hilltop youth launch attacks on the residents, including dumping waste into the local spring.

In 2024, outposts were established near Ras Auja, and since then the intensity of attacks against the village has increased. According to UN data, there were 36 settler attacks in 2024 and 38 attacks in 2025. Following the ongoing harassment and violence, the residents abandoned the village in February 2026.

== See also ==
- Ain Al-Auja Nature Reserve

== Bibliography ==
- Barron, J.B., ed. (1923). Palestine: Report and General Abstracts of the Census of 1922. Government of Palestine.
- Government of Palestine, Department of Statistics (1945). Village Statistics, April, 1945.
- Hadawi, S. (1970). "Village Statistics of 1945: A Classification of Land and Area ownership in Palestine". Palestine Liberation Organization Research Center. Archived from the original on 2018-12-08.
- Mills, E., ed. (1932). Census of Palestine 1931. Population of Villages, Towns and Administrative Areas. Jerusalem: Government of Palestine.
