= Marj Al-Ghazal =

- Municipality type D (Village council)

Arabic transcription(s)
  - Arabic: مرج الغزال
  - Latin: Marj Al-Ghazal (official)
- Interactive map of Marj Al-Ghazal
- State: State of Palestine
- Governorate: Jericho

Government
  - Type: Village council

Area
  - Total: 4,917 dunams (4.917 km^{2}; 1.898 sq mi)

Population (2017)
  - Total: 243
  - Density: 49.4/km^{2} (128/sq mi)

Marj Al-Ghazal (Arabic: مرج الغزال, Hebrew: מרג' אל-גזאל) is a Palestinian village in the Jericho Governorate in the West Bank, located 34.8 kilometers (21.6 mi) north of Jericho. According to the Palestinian Central Bureau of Statistics (PCBS), Marj Al-Ghazal had a population of 243 in the 2017 census.

== Location ==
Marj Al-Ghazal is bordered by the Jordan River to the east. Nearby Palestinian localities include az-Zubaidat to the northeast, Al-Jiftlik to the south and west.

== History ==
In the wake of the 1948 Arab–Israeli War, and after the 1949 Armistice Agreements, Marj al-Ghazal came under Jordanian rule. It was annexed by Jordan in 1950.

Since the Six-Day War in 1967, Marj al-Ghazal has been under Israeli occupation.

In 1970, Israel confiscated 509 dunum of village land in order to construct the Israeli settlement of Argaman.

After 1995 accords, 4% of Marj al-Ghazal's land was classified as Area B, the remaining 96% as Area C.

In the 2007 census Marj Al-Ghazal had a population of 193 with exactly 92 being males and 101 females. The total number of households was 43 who lived in 50 housing units.
