= Auja =

Auja may refer to:

- Auja al-Hafir, an ancient road junction in the Negev Desert on the border of modern Israel and Egypt
- Al-Awja, a village near Tikrit, Iraq
- al-Auja, Jericho, a Palestinian village north of Jericho named after Wadi Auja
- Auja, al-Auja, 'the crooked/meandering': streams and rivers with their valleys
  - Auja River (Nahr al-Auja), Arabic name of the Yarkon River, Israel
  - Wadi Auja, valley and stream on the West Bank, Palestine
  - Wadi al-Auja, wadi in Kuwait
