= Al-Jiftlik =

- Municipality type D (village council)

Arabic transcription(s)
  - Arabic: الجفتلك
  - Latin: Al-Jeftlik (official); El-Jeftlak (unofficial)
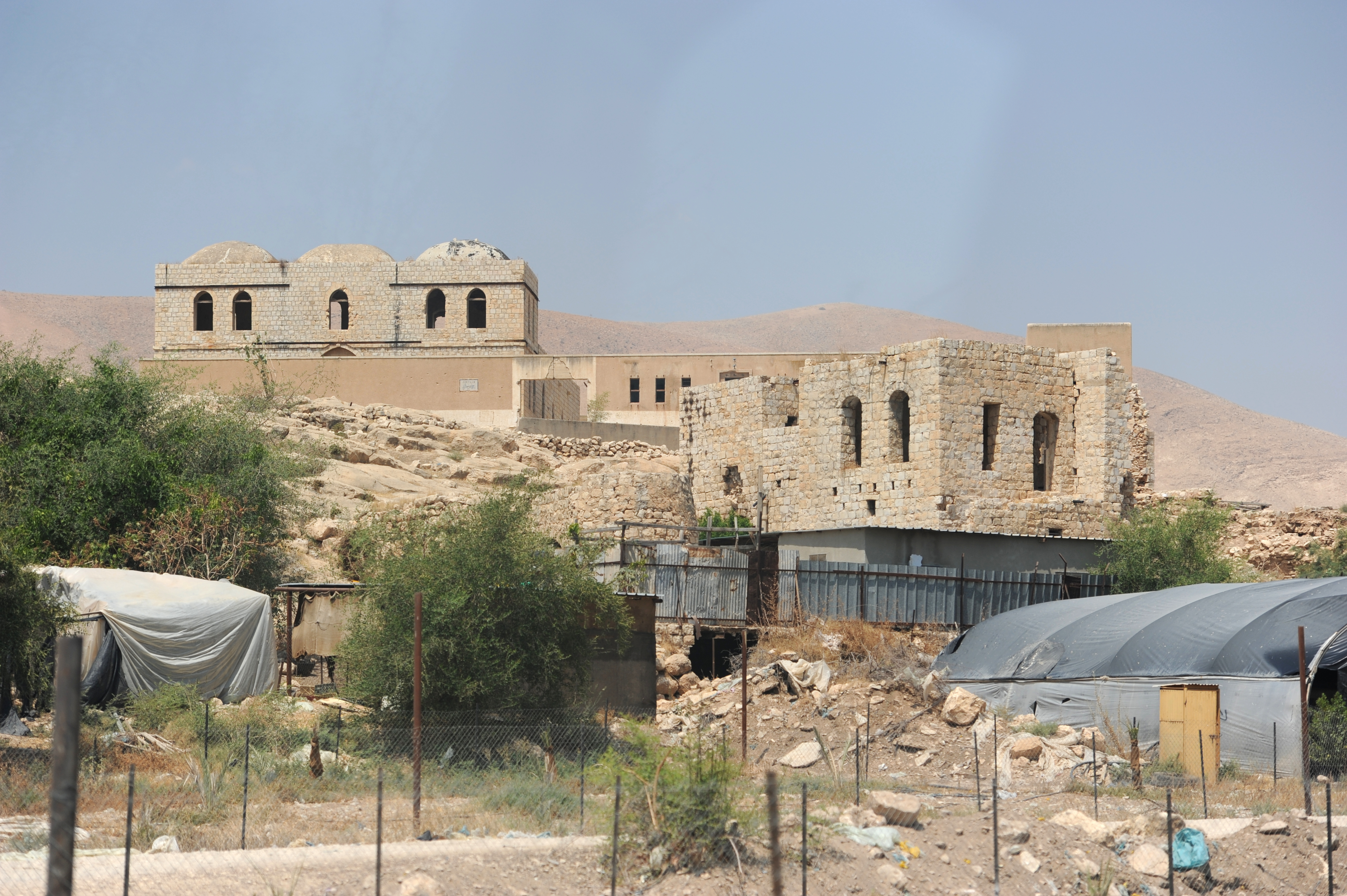
- UNRWA school in al-Jiftlik, 2011

- Location of Al-Jiftlik within Palestine Location of Al-Jiftlik within the West Bank
- Coordinates: 32°08′39″N 35°29′36″E
- Palestine grid: 196/172
- State: State of Palestine
- Governorate: Jericho

Government
  - Type: Village council
  - Head of Municipality: Muhammad Omar Jahalin

Area
  - Total: 185.0 km^{2} (71.4 sq mi)

Population (2017)
  - Total: 3,100
  - Density: 17/km^{2} (43/sq mi)

Al-Jiftlik (Arabic: الجفتلك) is a Palestinian village in the Jericho Governorate of the State of Palestine, in the West Bank, located 33 kilometers north of Jericho. Al Jiftlik is bordered by the Jordan River to the east. Nearby Palestinian localities include az-Zubaidat to the northeast, Furush Beit Dajan to the northwest, Beit Furik to the west, Aqraba, Majdal Bani Fadil and Duma to the southwest and al-Fasayil to the south. According to the Palestinian Central Bureau of Statistics (PCBS), al-Jiftlik had a population of 3,100 in the 2017 census.

The village's total area amounts to 185,032 dunams, of which 972 dunams are Palestinian built up areas, 77 are for commercial and industrial transport units, 64,032 are arable lands and 108,606 dunams are open spaces. Israeli settlements, including Masua, Hamra and Argaman and military bases account for 11,293 dunams. The remaining land consists of forests and inland water.

== Etymology ==
The village's name is derived from the Turkish word chiflik, the term for a homestead, farm or estate in the Ottoman Empire, which was applied in this as in many other Ottoman locations. According to ARIJ, the name comes from a Turkish word meaning either farm, estate, or land owned by the Sultan, and was given due to the agricultural nature of the village.

The Palestinian Rural History Project records the site's original name as Qarawa, distinguished as Qarawat al-Mas'udi (قراوة المسعودي), after the local Bedouin tribe.

== History ==
A notable archaeological site is Tell es-Samadi, and the village center dates back to the Ottoman period. Far'at ej-Jiftlik, situated ca. 3 km southeast of Jiftlik proper on the right bank of Wadi Far'a, was the site of one of the two large Chalcolithic settlements in the flood plain of that stream, along with Kaziyet er-Ratrut.

The majority of the land in al-Jiftlik belonged to the powerful Bedouin al-Masa'id tribe, whose land spanned from Damia in Transjordan, on the east bank of the Jordan River, to the borders of Jericho in the West Bank. Most of its residents are descendants of the al-Masa'id tribe and immigrants from Tammun to the north.

During the Mandate period, there was a Tegart fort known as the Jiftlik Police Post just west of the present village.

In the wake of the 1948 Arab–Israeli War, and after the 1949 Armistice Agreements, Al-Jiftlik came under Jordanian rule.

Since the Six-Day War in 1967, Al-Jiftlik has been under Israeli occupation. In the aftermath of the war over 800 homes in al-Jiftlik were razed by the Israeli army and its 6,000 inhabitants were ordered to leave. Most of al-Jiftlik's inhabitants, however, returned to the village.

After the 1995 Accords between the Israel and the Palestine Liberation Organization (PLO), the village was designated as part of Area C. This makes it subject to full Israeli military and civil administration. This has allowed the Israelis to commit what Robert Fisk in 2010 called "ethnic cleansing via bureaucracy". According to the head of the village council in Jiftlik, Palestinian requests for building were denied or delayed for years, and anything built without permission was "ruthlessly" torn down by the Israelis.

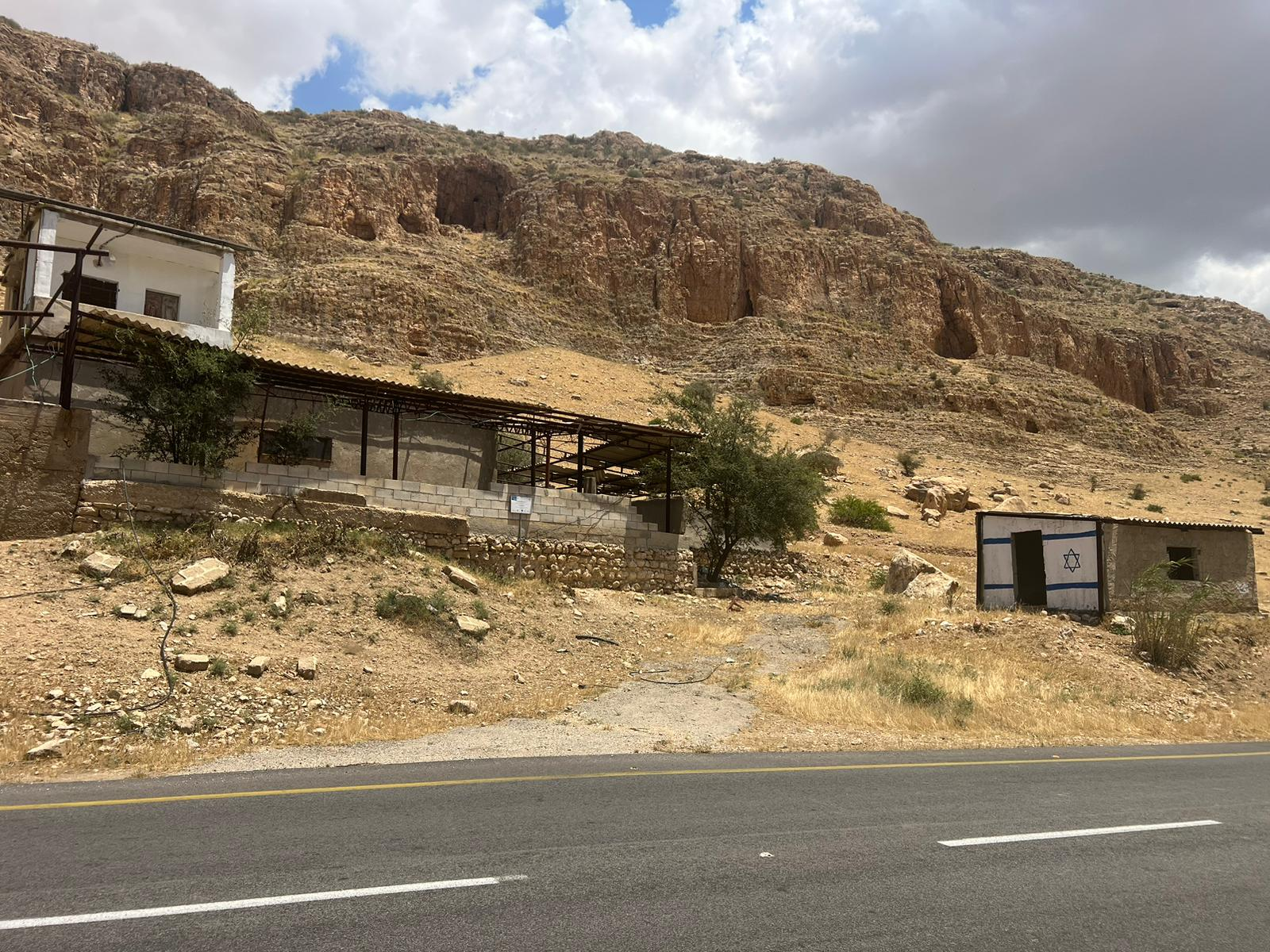
Israeli flag painted by settlers on a Palestinian building in Al-Jiftlik, May 2024

In 2005 a village council was established to administer local affairs. Its nine members are appointed by the Palestinian National Authority. The council maintains a permanent headquarters and owns a waste collection vehicle. Among its responsibilities are building water and electricity networks in al-Jiftlik and providing an ambulance for the village.

== Land confiscations by Israel ==
According to ARIJ, Israel has confiscated land from Al-Jiftlik in order to construct several Israeli settlements:

- 2,209 dunams were taken for Masua,
- 1,464 dunams were taken for Ma'ale Efrayim,
- 1,294 dunams were taken for Yafit,
- 645 dunams were taken for Argaman,
- 514 dunams were taken for Gitit,
- 438 dunams were taken for Mekhora,
- 176 dunams were taken for Petza'el.

== Demographics ==
In the 2007 census al-Jiftlik had a population of 3,546 with exactly 50% being males and the other 50% females. The total number of households was 578 who lived in 692 housing units. The principal clans in al-Jiftlik are the 'Arab al-Masa'id, 'Arab al-Jahalin, 'Arab al-Ayed, al-Ajajrah, Abu Sureis, Abu Dalakh, Abu Dheila, al-Annuz, al-Rutimat and al-Nafei'at. According to the Applied Research Institute-Jerusalem (ARIJ), about 100 families have left al-Jiftlik since the start of the Second Intifada in 2000.

== Economy and education ==
Like several other villages in the Jordan Valley area, al-Jiftlik is subject to Israeli restrictions on construction and movement, and most often requests for building permits are denied. The village lacks electricity and water infrastructure. It has primary school managed by the UNRWA with 950 students.

== Id'eis ==
Id'eis is a Palestinian community several kilometres south of Al-Jiftlik, close to the Masua Israeli settlement. In May 2014, there were 23 families in two neighboring compounds made up of 13 families consisting of 75 people in 15 residential structures living in the north-west compound and 10 families consisting of 53 people living in 14 tents in the southern compound. Each compound also has many livestock structures for their flocks of several thousand sheep and goats. The community makes its living from shepherding and settled in the present location in 1982 having left the Hebron area and migrated across the Jordan Valley as they searched for pastureland. On 21 May 2014, the southern compound was demolished by five Israeli Civil Administration bulldozers supported by IDF soldiers and Border Police on the basis that the families did not have building permits.
