= Wadi Auja =

Stream-fed valley, State of Palestine

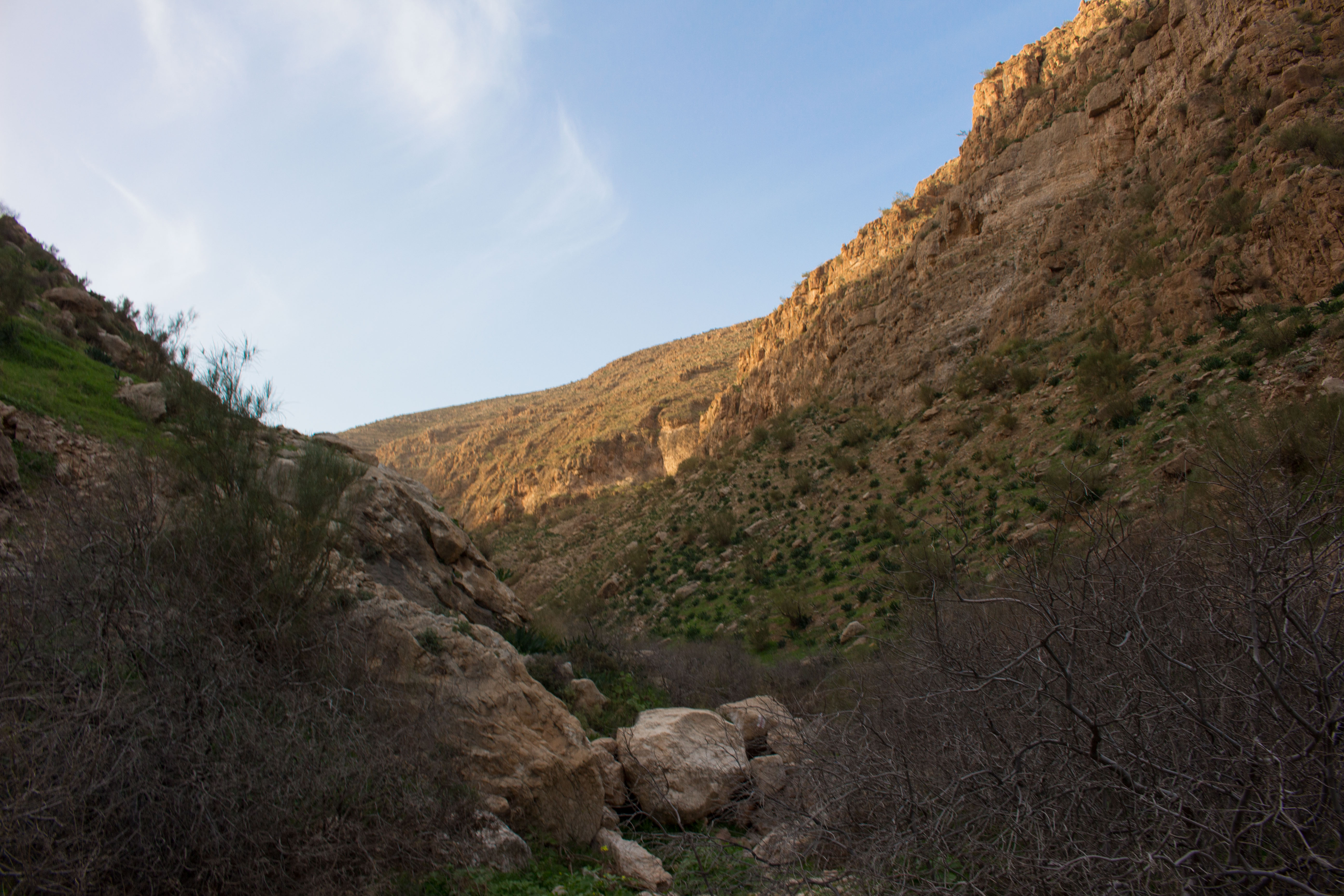
The gorge of Wadi Auja, 2016

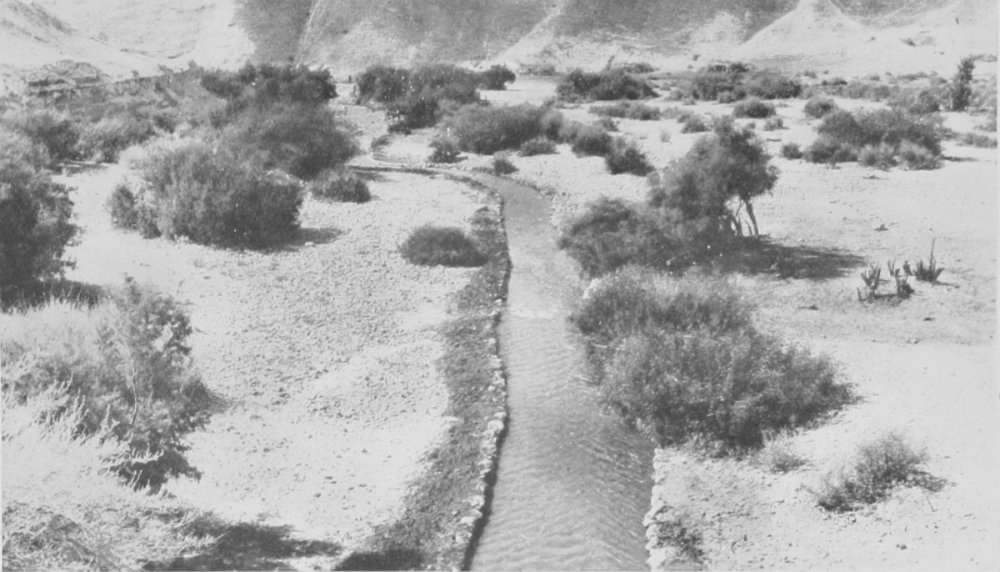
Wadi Auja, 1919

Wadi Auja (Arabic: وادي العوجا), also spelled Wadi 'Aujah, Wadi Ouja, etc., known in Hebrew as Nahal Yitav (Hebrew: נחל ייט"ב) is a valley or stream (Arabic: وادي wādī, "wadi"), in the West Bank, originating near the Ein Samia spring and flowing to Al-Auja near Jericho before it runs into the Jordan River.

== Name ==
"Al-auja" means "the meandering one". Wadi Auja (Auja Stream) should not be confused with the Yarkon River in Israel, which flows to the Mediterranean Sea in Tel Aviv, known in Arabic by the name Nahr al-Auja (Auja River). During World War I this coincidence led to the term of "the line of the two Aujas", referring to a strategic line connecting the two river valleys.

The Hebrew name is based on the Israeli settlement Yitav, founded in 1970 on the northern river bank, next to the Palestinian village of al-Auja. "Yitav" is an acronym for Yad Yitzhak Tabenkin.

== Geography ==
Wadi Auja is 35 kilometers long and sets the boundary between the desert and the eastern hillslopes of the West Bank. It has a drainage area of 200 square kilometers and descends from a height of approximately 1000 meters above sea level to -315 meters below sea level, where it flows into the Jordan River. The stream starts at Ein Samia, on the eastern slopes of Mount Hazor and flows eastward. Before its arrival to the Jordan Rift Valley, it forms a deep and steep gorge, some 3 kilometers long. In this area some waterfalls are formed. Ein Samia has been diverted to provide water to Ramallah, some 20 km away, providing around 30% of the city's needs, and leaving most of the wadi dry throughout the year. The Auja Spring (Ein el-Auja) produces an estimated 9 million cubic metres of water annually, which creates a small oasis that attracts thousands of tourists a year, as well as providing for the farmers of Auja village.

Two ancient aqueducts built in Wadi Auja during the late Second Temple period (and refurbished in later generations) carried water from their source at ʻAin el-Aûjah ("the crooked spring") to their respective destinations, the one termed Ḳanât el-Manîl (Qanat el-Manil, "the canal of el-Manil") which led to an outlet in the Jordan valley north of Jericho, and the other termed Ḳanât Farʻûn ("Pharaoh's canal"), thought to have brought water to the fortified town of Archelais.

The associated Ain Al-Auja Nature Reserve, fed by the spring, covers approximately 22,000 dunams of oasis habitat, where rows of precipitous cliffs are exposed and inside them a variety of rare birds of prey and perennial plants can be found, including medicinal plants and springs.

== History ==
The area was occupied by Israel in 1967.

The Auja spring has historically irrigated the fertile farmland of the nearby village of Al-Auja, earning the area a reputation as a "fruit basket" for citrus and banana cultivation. The wadi was traditionally also used by many Bedouin shepherds. Since the early 2000s, drought and the diversion of the spring's water by nearby Israeli settlements have sharply reduced the water available to Palestinian farmers, forcing many to shift from water-intensive crops to less demanding produce or to seek work in settlement agriculture. By 2026, Palestinian residents and rights groups reported that settlers had fenced off sections of the spring and installed pumps drawing directly from the aquifer, further restricting Palestinian access to the water source.

Wadi Auja has also been used as an important hiking trial for both local hikers and tourists

== See also ==
- Jordan Valley
