= Yafit =

Settlement in the West Bank

Yafit: יַפִית (Hebrew)
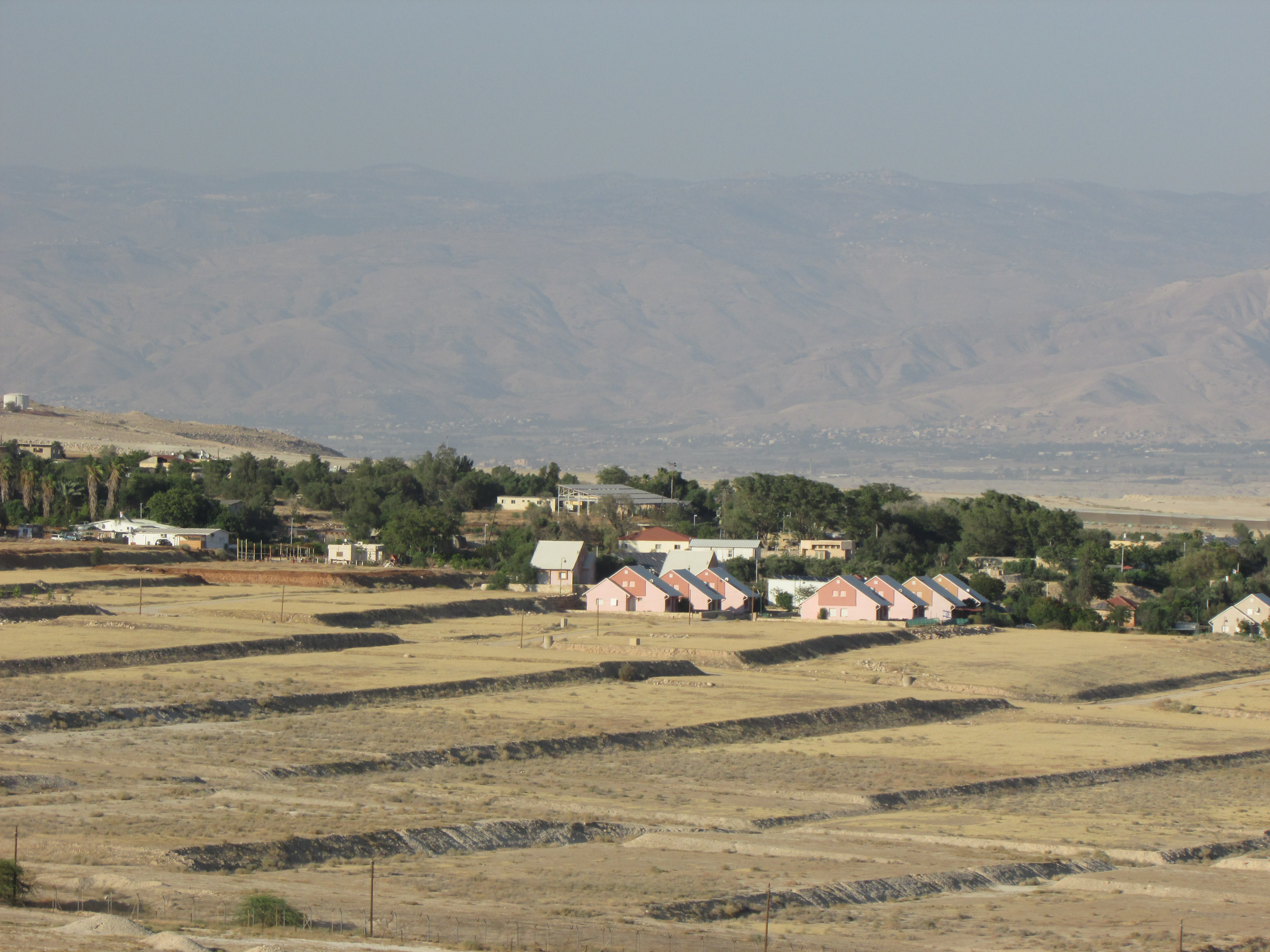

- Location within the Central West Bank
- Coordinates: 32°3′41″N 35°28′27″E
- Country: Palestine
- District: Judea and Samaria Area
- Council: Bik'at HaYarden
- Region: West Bank
- Affiliation: Moshavim Movement
- Founded: 1980
- Founder: Israeli civilians
- Population (2024): 279

Yafit (Hebrew: יַפִית, lit. 'Beautiful') is an Israeli settlement organized as a moshav shitufi in the West Bank. Located in the Jordan Valley, it falls under the jurisdiction of Bik'at HaYarden Regional Council. In 2024 it had a population of 279.

The international community considers Israeli settlements in the West Bank illegal under international law, but the Israeli government disputes this.

== History ==
According to ARIJ, in 1980 Israel confiscated 1,294 dunams of land from the Palestinian village of Al-Jiftlik in order to construct Yafit.

Yafit was built in the 1980s on a plot of rocky land in the Jordan Valley by Israelis who were attracted by the beauty of the desert. It was named after Yossi Yafa, an IDF commander. In 1992 the founders were joined by immigrants from Russia. In the 1990s, it was one of the largest communities in the valley and a cultural and educational center. Due to drive-by shootings by Palestinians on Route 90, many residents have left.
