= Gilgal (Israeli settlement) =

Israeli settlement in the West Bank

Gilgal: גלגל (Hebrew)
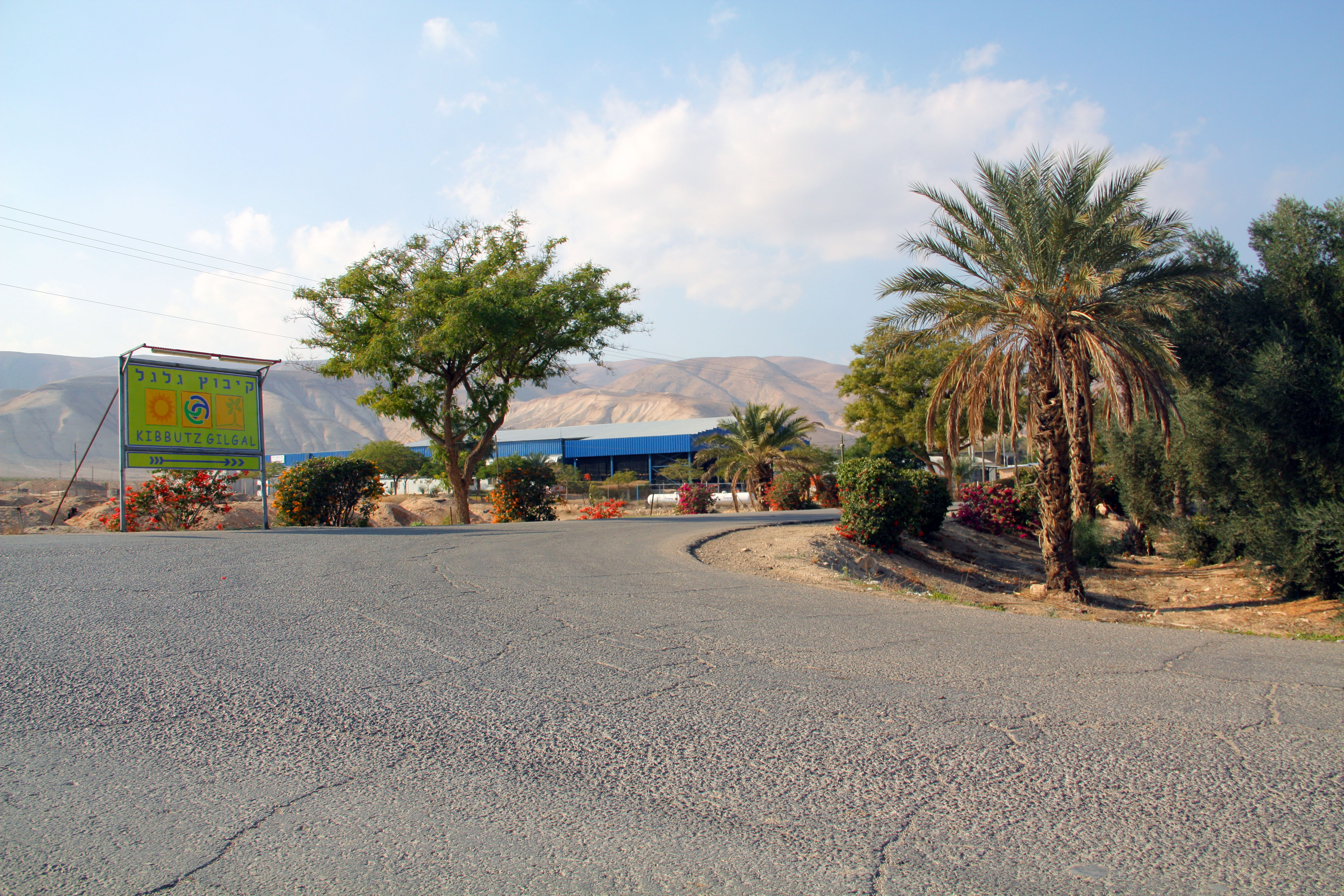

- Location within the Central West Bank Location within the West Bank
- Coordinates: 31°59′59″N 35°26′40″E
- Country: Palestine
- District: Judea and Samaria Area
- Council: Bik'at HaYarden
- Region: West Bank
- Affiliation: Kibbutz Movement
- Founded: 1970
- Founder: Nahal
- Population (2024): 221

Gilgal (Hebrew: גלגל) is an Israeli settlement organized as a kibbutz in the West Bank. Located in the Jordan Valley around 16 kilometres north of Jericho with an area of 1,400 dunams, it falls under the jurisdiction of Bik'at HaYarden Regional Council. In 2024 it had a population of 221.

The international community considers Israeli settlements in the West Bank illegal under international law, but the Israeli government disputes this.

== History ==
Gilgal was established in 1970 as a Nahal settlement, and was named for the ancient biblical site of Gilgal. It was converted to a civilian kibbutz in 1973.

According to ARIJ, in order to construct Gilgal, Israel confiscated land in 1970 from two Palestinian villages: 858 dunams from Fasayil, and 268 dunams from Al-Auja.

== Economy ==
Gilgal has invested millions of dollars in state-of-the-art water technology to boost its production of medjool dates. The system is based on the utilization of wastewater.

== Climate ==
Climate data for Gilgal (–255m)
Month	Jan	Feb	Mar	Apr	May	Jun	Jul	Aug	Sep	Oct	Nov	Dec	Year
Record high °C (°F)	28.0 (82.4)	33.5 (92.3)	40.5 (104.9)	44.7 (112.5)	46.5 (115.7)	47.5 (117.5)	48.1 (118.6)	49.0 (120.2)	45.7 (114.3)	44.2 (111.6)	37.9 (100.2)	32.5 (90.5)	49.0 (120.2)
Mean daily maximum °C (°F)	20.1 (68.2)	21.6 (70.9)	25.6 (78.1)	30.3 (86.5)	35.6 (96.1)	38.7 (101.7)	40.4 (104.7)	40.0 (104.0)	37.7 (99.9)	33.8 (92.8)	27.7 (81.9)	22.1 (71.8)	31.1 (88.1)
Daily mean °C (°F)	14.5 (58.1)	15.5 (59.9)	18.7 (65.7)	22.8 (73.0)	27.3 (81.1)	30.5 (86.9)	32.4 (90.3)	32.5 (90.5)	30.5 (86.9)	26.9 (80.4)	21.1 (70.0)	16.4 (61.5)	24.1 (75.4)
Mean daily minimum °C (°F)	8.9 (48.0)	9.4 (48.9)	11.8 (53.2)	15.3 (59.5)	19.1 (66.4)	22.3 (72.1)	24.5 (76.1)	25.0 (77.0)	23.2 (73.8)	19.9 (67.8)	14.4 (57.9)	10.6 (51.1)	17.0 (62.7)
Record low °C (°F)	0.3 (32.5)	0.0 (32.0)	2.5 (36.5)	3.0 (37.4)	11.2 (52.2)	15.2 (59.4)	20.0 (68.0)	19.5 (67.1)	14.0 (57.2)	12.1 (53.8)	4.6 (40.3)	0.2 (32.4)	0.0 (32.0)
Source: Israel Meteorological Service

== See also ==
- Gilgal I, early Neolithic site (11,400–11,200 BP) near the kibbutz, with earliest findings of fig tree cultivation in the world
- Judean date palm
