= Argaman =

Israeli settlement in the West Bank

Argaman: אַרְגָּמָן (Hebrew); أرجمان (Arabic)
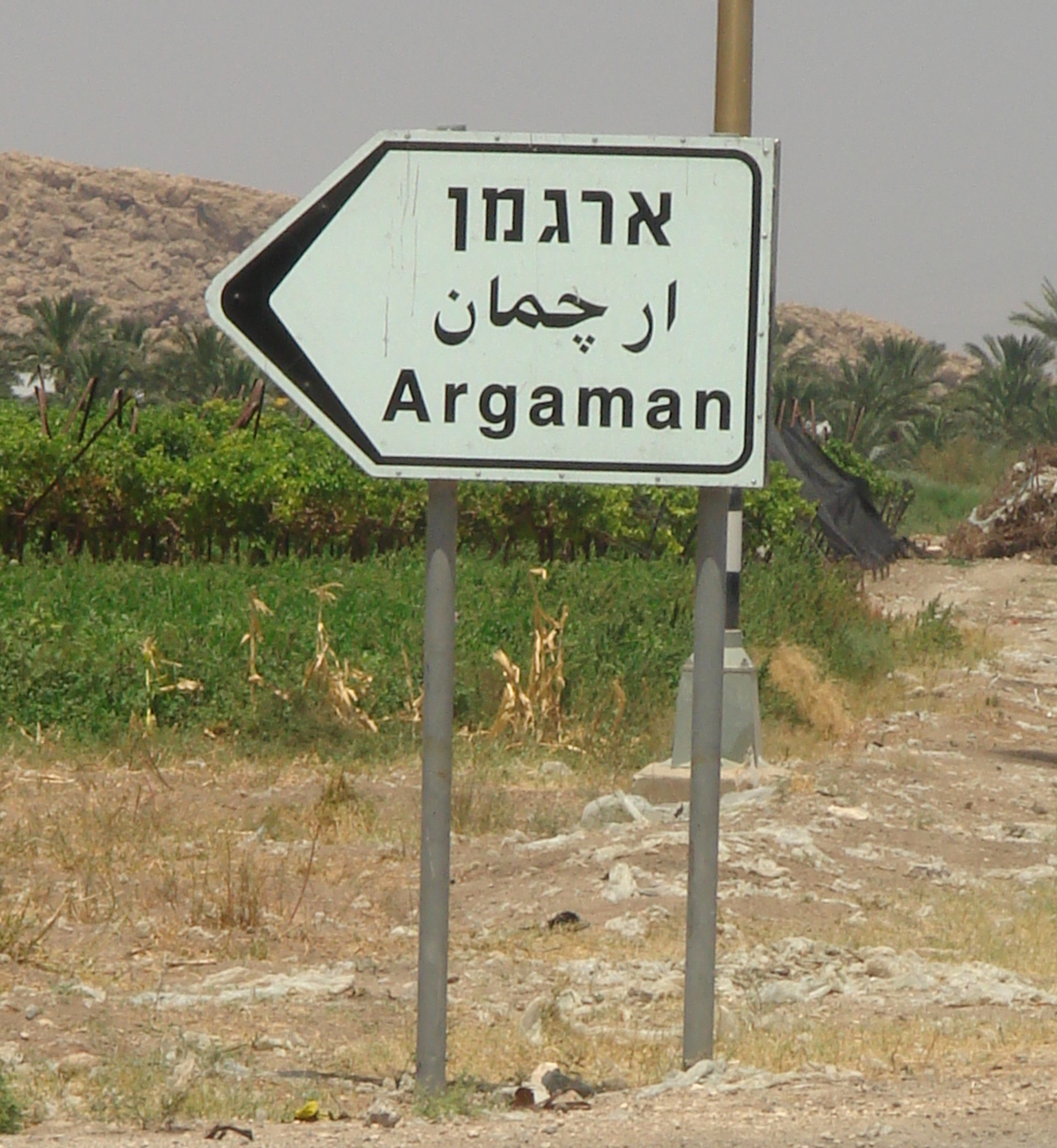
- Etymology: Crimson
- Location within the Northern West Bank
- Coordinates: 32°10′21″N 35°31′19″E
- Country: Palestine
- District: Judea and Samaria Area
- Council: Bik'at HaYarden
- Region: West Bank
- Affiliation: Mishkei Herut Beitar
- Founded: 1968
- Founder: Nahal
- Population (2024): 184

Argaman (Hebrew: אַרְגָּמָן, lit. 'Crimson') is an Israeli settlement organized as a moshav in the West Bank. Located in the Jordan Valley, eight kilometres north of the Damia Bridge with an area of 4,500 dunams, it falls under the jurisdiction of Bik'at HaYarden Regional Council. In 2024, its population was 184.

The international community considers Israeli settlements in the West Bank illegal under international law, but the Israeli government disputes this.

== Etymology ==
The moshav's name is an acronym for Arik Regev, and Gad Manela, two Nahal commanders who were killed there in a clash with Arab militants.

== History ==
Initially established in 1968 as a Nahal settlement by the Betar movement, Argaman was converted to a civilian moshav in May 1971. Before the establishment of Argaman, Moshe Dayan, then Israeli Minister of Defense, was opposed to the installment of settlements in the center of the Jordan Rift Valley as it would show too explicitly that the Palestinian Arabs of the West Bank were being separated from the Arabs east of the Jordan River.

According to the ARIJ, Israel confiscated land from three Palestinian villages to construct Argaman:

- 645 dunums from Al-Jiftlik,
- 509 dunams from Marj Al-Ghazal,
- 48 dunams from Az-Zubaidat.
