= Masua =

Israeli settlement in the West Bank

Masua: מַשּׂוּאָה (Hebrew)
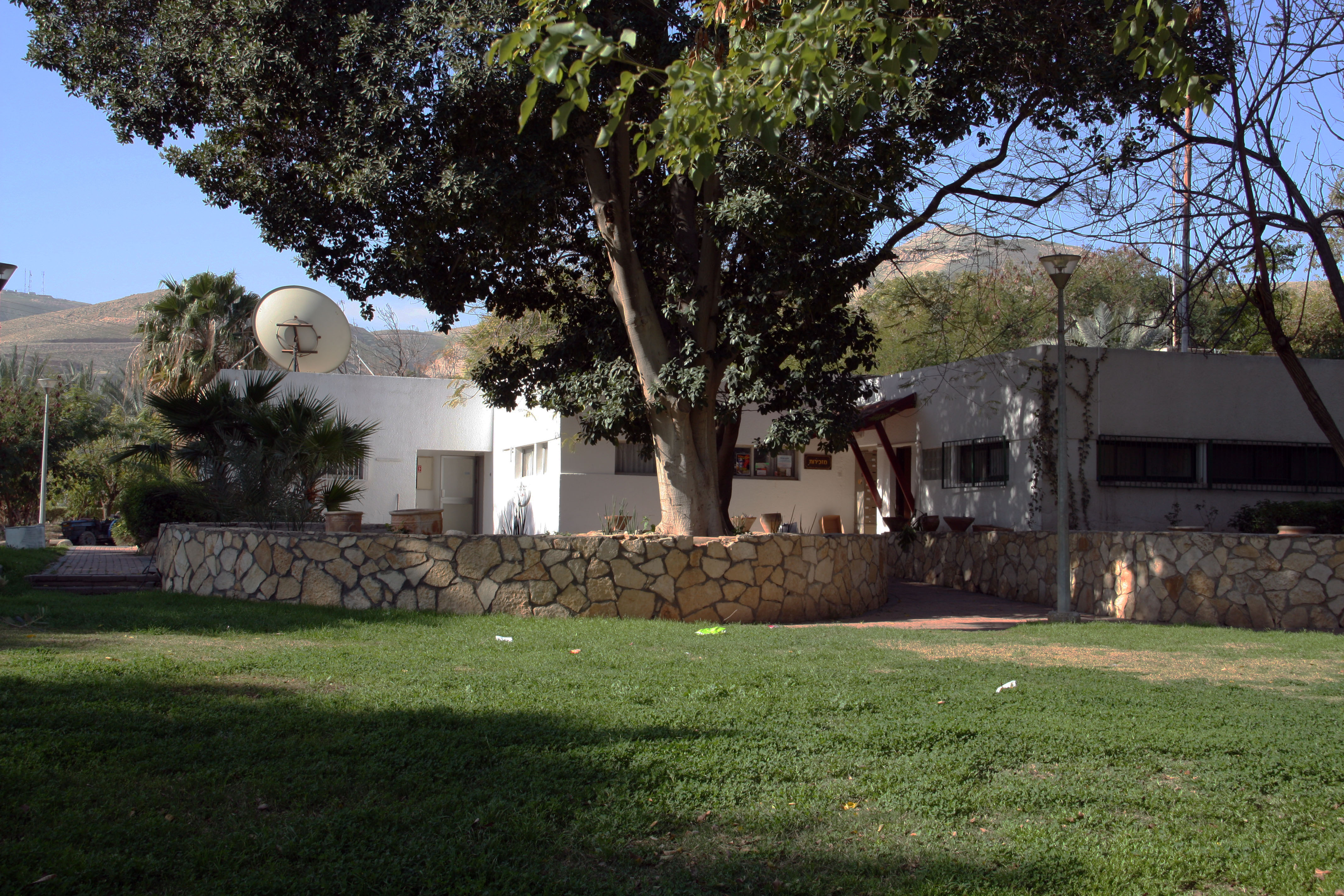

- Location within the Northern West Bank
- Coordinates: 32°06′48″N 35°29′33″E
- Country: Palestine
- District: Judea and Samaria Area
- Council: Bik'at HaYarden
- Region: West Bank
- Affiliation: HaOved HaTzioni
- Founded: 1969
- Founder: Nahal
- Population (2024): 481

Masua (Hebrew: מַשּׂוּאָה, lit. Torch, Arabic: مسواه), also transliterated as Massu'a, is an Israeli settlement organized as a moshav shitufi in the West Bank. Located in the Jordan Valley, with an area of 6,000 dunams, it falls under the jurisdiction of Bik'at HaYarden Regional Council. In 2024 it had a population of 481.

The international community considers Israeli settlements in the West Bank illegal under international law, but the Israeli and US governments dispute this.

== History ==
The village was established in 1969 as a Nahal settlement, and was converted to a civilian moshav by a HaOved HaTzioni gar'in five years later.

According to ARIJ, Israel has confiscated 2,209 dunams of land from the Palestinian village of Al-Jiftlik in order to construct Masua.

== Sartava Nature Reserve ==
Four kilometers west-southwest of Masua is the Sartava Nature Reserve, named in tribute to a mountain from which, in Mishnaic times, Jews would relay signals via torch to indicate that a new month had been proclaimed.

Formerly bonfires were lighted (to announce the appearance of the new moon); but when the Cutheans practiced their deceit, it was ordained that messengers should be sent out. How were these bonfires lighted? They brought long staves of cedar wood, canes, and branches of the olive tree, and bundles of tow which were tied on top of them with twine; with these they went to the top of a mountain, and lighted them, and kept waving them to and fro, upward and downward, till they could perceive the same repeated by another person on the next mountain, and thus, on the third mountain, etc. Whence did these bonfires commence? From the Mount of Olives to Sartabha, from Sartabha to Grophinah, from Grophinah to Hoveran, from Hoveran to Beth Baltin; they did not cease waving the burning torches at Beth Baltin, to and fro, upward and downward, until the whole country of the captivity appeared like a blazing fire.

— Rosh Hashanah (tractate)

The summit of Sartava has remains of a fort built by King Alexander of Judea. The area of Sartava, which is split down its length due to the Great Rift Valley, is unique in that it embodies a transition between the Mediterranean habitats of Samaria on the one hand and the more desert-like habitats of the Arava on the other.

== See also ==
- Rosh Hodesh
