= Wadi el Maleh =

Stream in West Bank

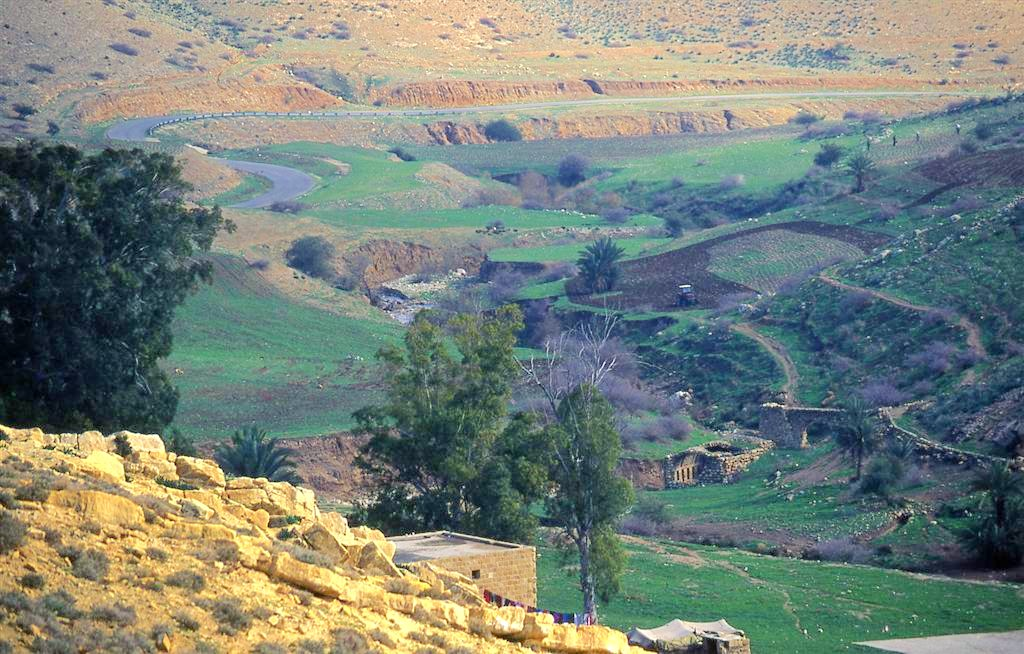
A view on Wadi el Maleh, Hammam el Maleh, and Road 5799

Wadi el Maleh (Arabic: وادي المالح, (Note: El Maleh means 'salty' in Arabic) also Wadi al Maleh, al Malich, etc.; Hebrew: נחל מלחה, Nahal Milcha, Milkha Stream, also Milcha, Malcha, etc.) is a non-intermittent stream in West Bank. It is within the basin of the Lower Jordan River near Highway 90 and is very low-watered, with the exception of storm discharge periods.

It starts in Samarian Hills at the altitude of 600 metres (2,000 ft) northwest of Tubas and flows into the Jordan Valley in the area between Mehola and Shadmot Mehola. (Its lower flow marks the southern boundary of the Beit She'an Valley.) Its length is about 17 km (11 mi) and drainage basin of about 90 km^{2} (35 sq mi).

It follows geological faults and makes a nearly 90 degree kink northwards in the area where Road 5799 joins the Allon Road and further arcs around Shadmot Mehola to flow into the Jordan River in the west-to-east direction at about 32.3539°N 35.5552°E.

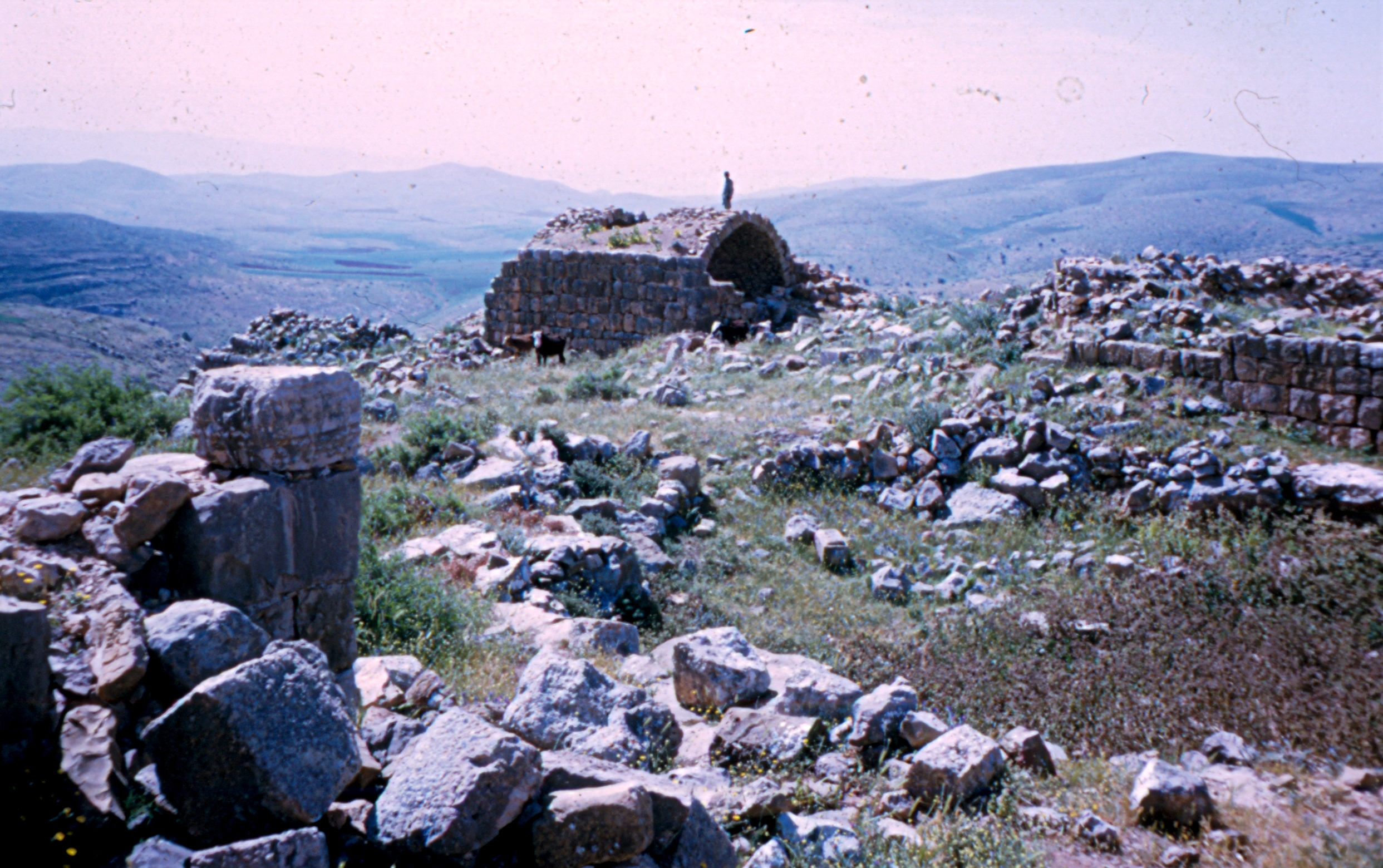
Burj el Maleh

Places of note along the stream include Hammam el Maleh, a hammam by mineral hot springs, and Burj el Maleh, a Mamluk fortress.
