= Yitav =

Israeli settlement and moshav shitufi in the southern Jordan Valley of the West Bank

Yitav: יִיטַ״ב (Hebrew)
- Location within the Central West Bank
- Coordinates: 31°56′50″N 35°25′23″E
- Country: Palestine
- District: Judea and Samaria Area
- Council: Bik'at HaYarden
- Region: West Bank
- Affiliation: Kibbutz Movement
- Founded: 1970
- Founder: Nahal
- Population (2024): 184

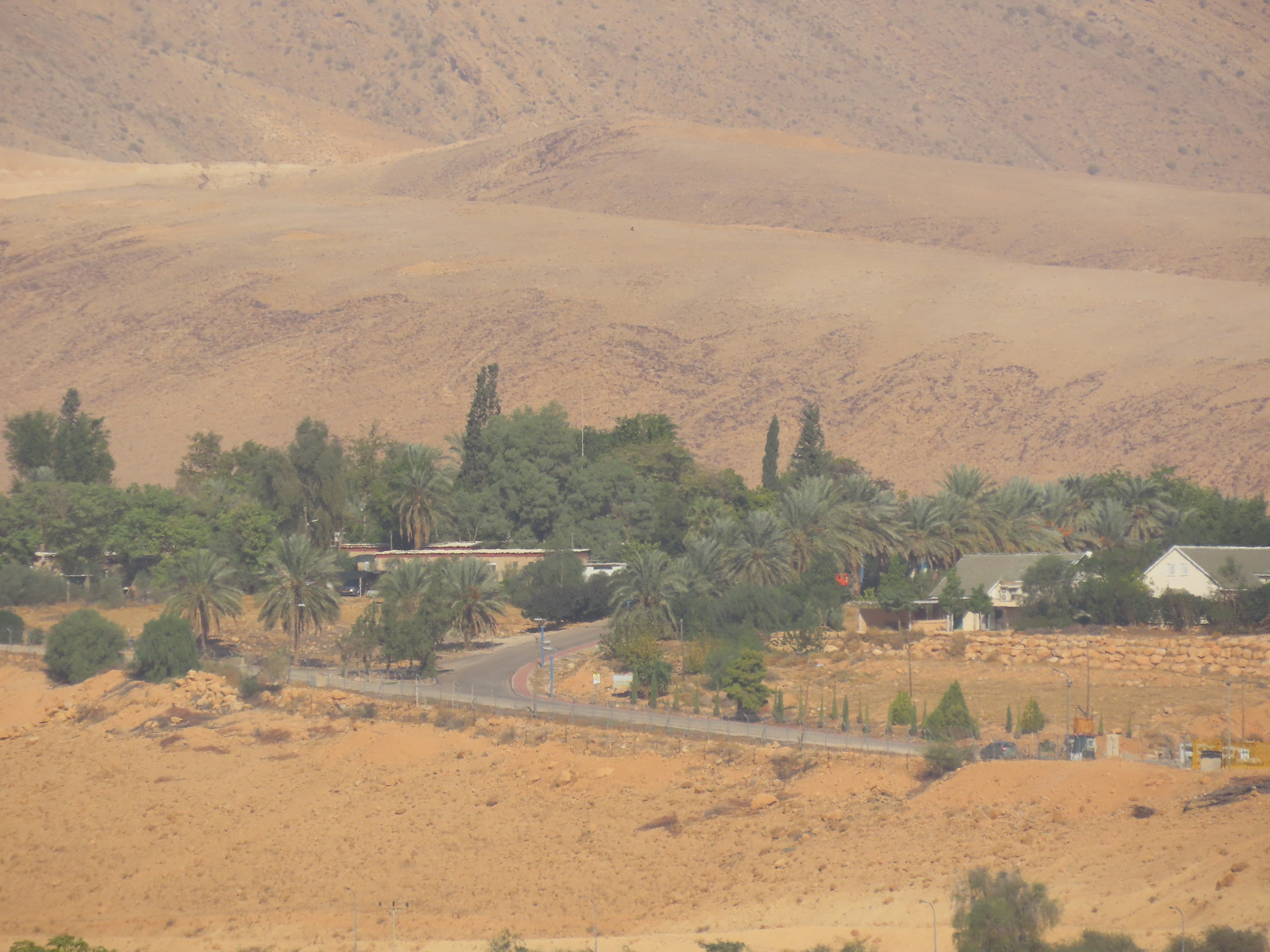
Entrance to Yitav

Yitav (Hebrew: יִיטַ״ב, an abbreviation of Yad Yitzhak Tabenkin) is an Israeli settlement and moshav shitufi in the southern Jordan Valley of the West Bank. Located just north of Jericho and west of the Palestinian village of al-Auja, it falls under the jurisdiction of Bik'at HaYarden Regional Council. In 2024 it had a population of 184.

The international community considers Israeli settlements in the West Bank illegal under international law, but the Israeli government disputes this.

== History ==
According to ARIJ, Israel confiscated 499 dunams of land from the Palestinian village of Al-Auja in order to construct Yitav.

Niran was established as a Nahal settlement in 1970, Yitav was recognised by the state in 1977, and began operating as a kibbutz. It was named a memorial (Hebrew: yad) to Yitzhak Tabenkin, one of the leaders of the Israeli kibbutz movement. It subsequently reorganized into a moshav shitufi (though remaining within the Kibbutz Movement), whose members today are immigrants from the former Soviet Union (34 families).

== Nature ==
Subtropical agriculture is the main economic activity in Yitav (dates, bananas, vegetables), although some members have outside jobs in the surrounding area or in Jerusalem.

Yitav Nature Reserve located 4 km west of Yitav covers the canyon of Nahal Yitav (Wadi al-Auja) with its springs.
