= Mevo'ot Yeriho =

Mevo'ot Yericho: מבואות יריחו (Hebrew)
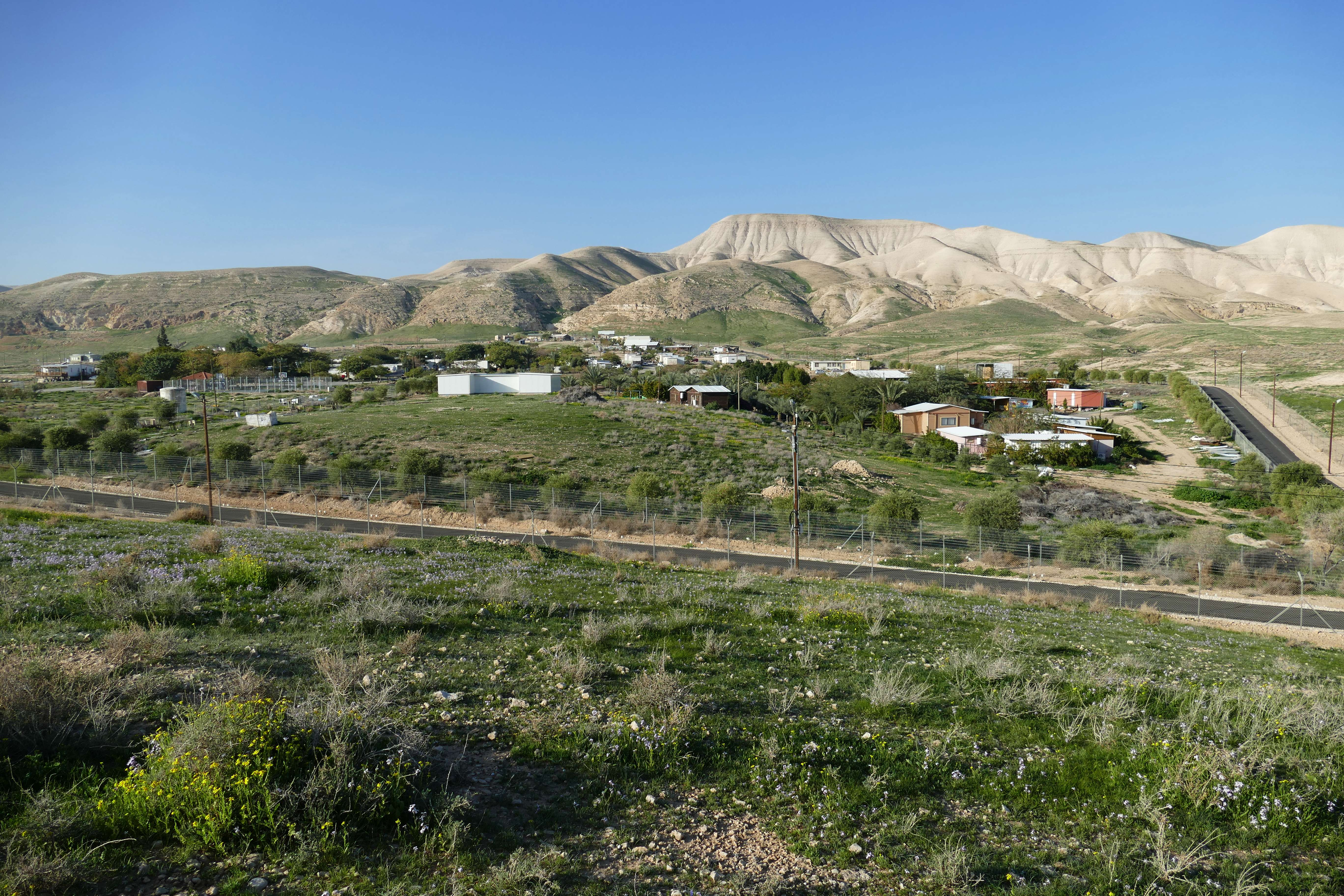

- Location within the Central West Bank
- Coordinates: 31°54′28″N 35°25′1″E
- Country: Israel
- District: Judea and Samaria Area
- Council: Bik'at HaYarden
- Region: Jordan Rift Valley
- Founded: 1999
- Founder: Amana
- Population (2024): 492

Mevo'ot Yericho (Hebrew: מְבוֹאוֹת יְרִיחוֹ, lit. Doorway to Jericho), founded in 1999, is an Israeli settlement and a community settlement located in the West Bank's southern Jordan Valley just north of Jericho, in the Yitav Valley. The site is 150m below sea level. It falls under the municipal jurisdiction of the Bik'at HaYarden Regional Council. In 2024 it had a population of 492.

The international community considers Israeli settlements in the West Bank illegal under international law, but the Israeli government disputes this.

On 15 September 2019 the Israeli government officially approved the establishment of the settlement, making it the sixth new official settlement since the Oslo accords.

== History ==
Founded as a station for agricultural experiments known as Havat HaIklum (lit. "The acclimatization farm"), Mevo'ot Yericho became a farming community in 2000. Over the years more families joined and many of them are not involved in agriculture. The total number of families has gone up from a single family to 28 today. Several crops are grown including lemons, dates, figs, grapes, sweet potatoes, passion fruit and more.

In the mid-2000s, a project for disadvantaged girls was established at Mevo'ot Yericho. The girls live and work in the community and travel to Jerusalem for studies in the evening. This project is named Ginat Eden (Hebrew: גינת עדן) and continues to grow and help these girls every day.

== Mikveh ==
Mikveh in Mevo'ot Yericho

The construction of what may be the world's first solar-powered mikveh was completed in 2007. The mikveh is in constant use, including a side opening for the purification of utensils.

== New neighborhood ==
Over the last few years the community has gone through a process of shifting from temporary housing to permanent structures. Several families have moved into the new houses located above and behind the old community center.

== Archaeology ==
Numerous archaeological findings in the area attest to the presence of ancient Jewish settlement. Within the settlement remains of an aqueduct are clearly visible. Remains of this aqueduct run both north and south of the community and can be traced almost all the way from the nearby spring to the area of the ancient synagogue. Both the aqueduct and nearby Na'aran synagogue are dated to the 6th century. Archaeologists believe that these are the remains of a thriving Jewish community that existed in this area at that time.
