= Jericho Governorate =

Governorate of Palestine

Coordinates: 32°01′29.72″N 35°26′43.73″E

- Governorate
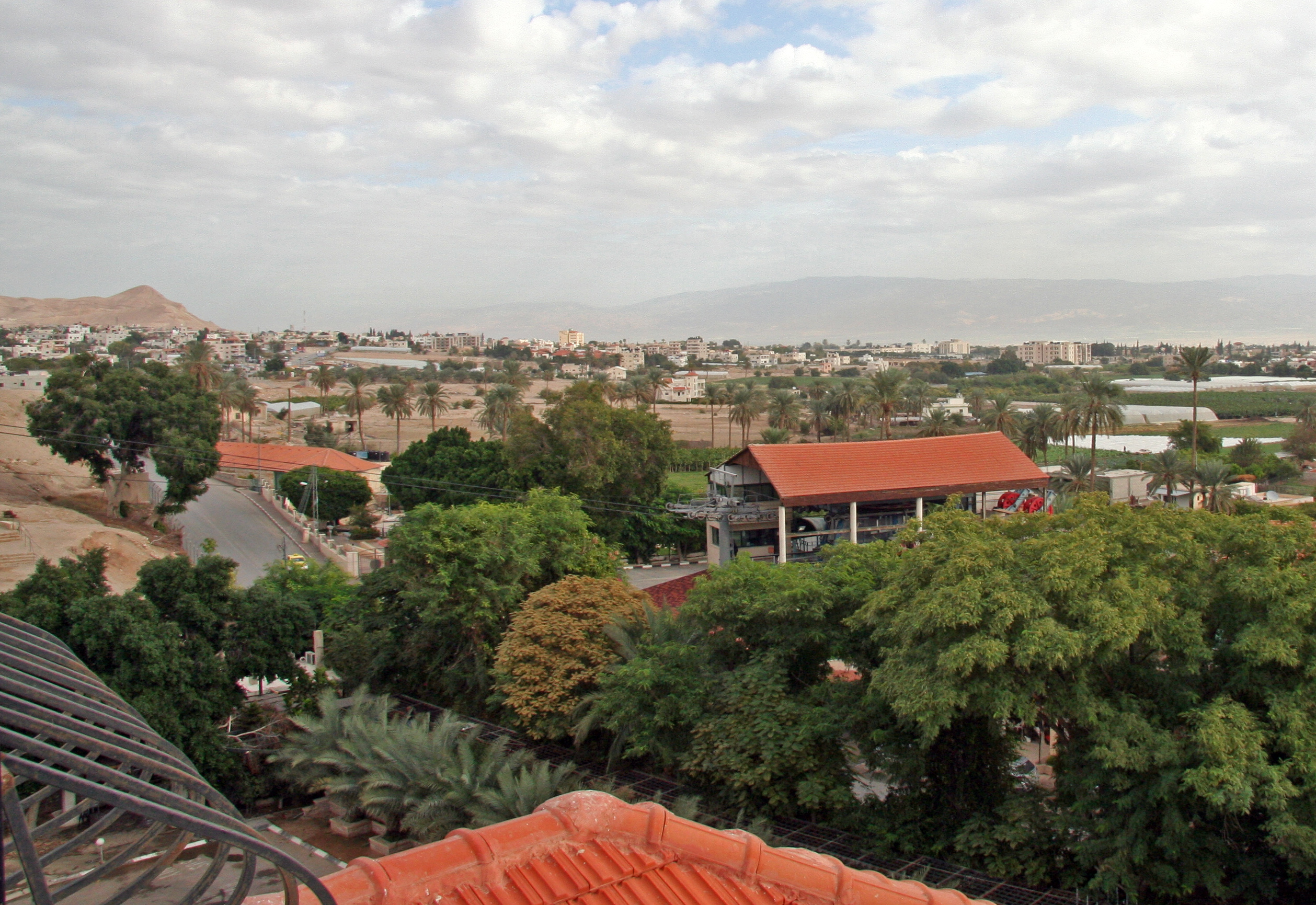

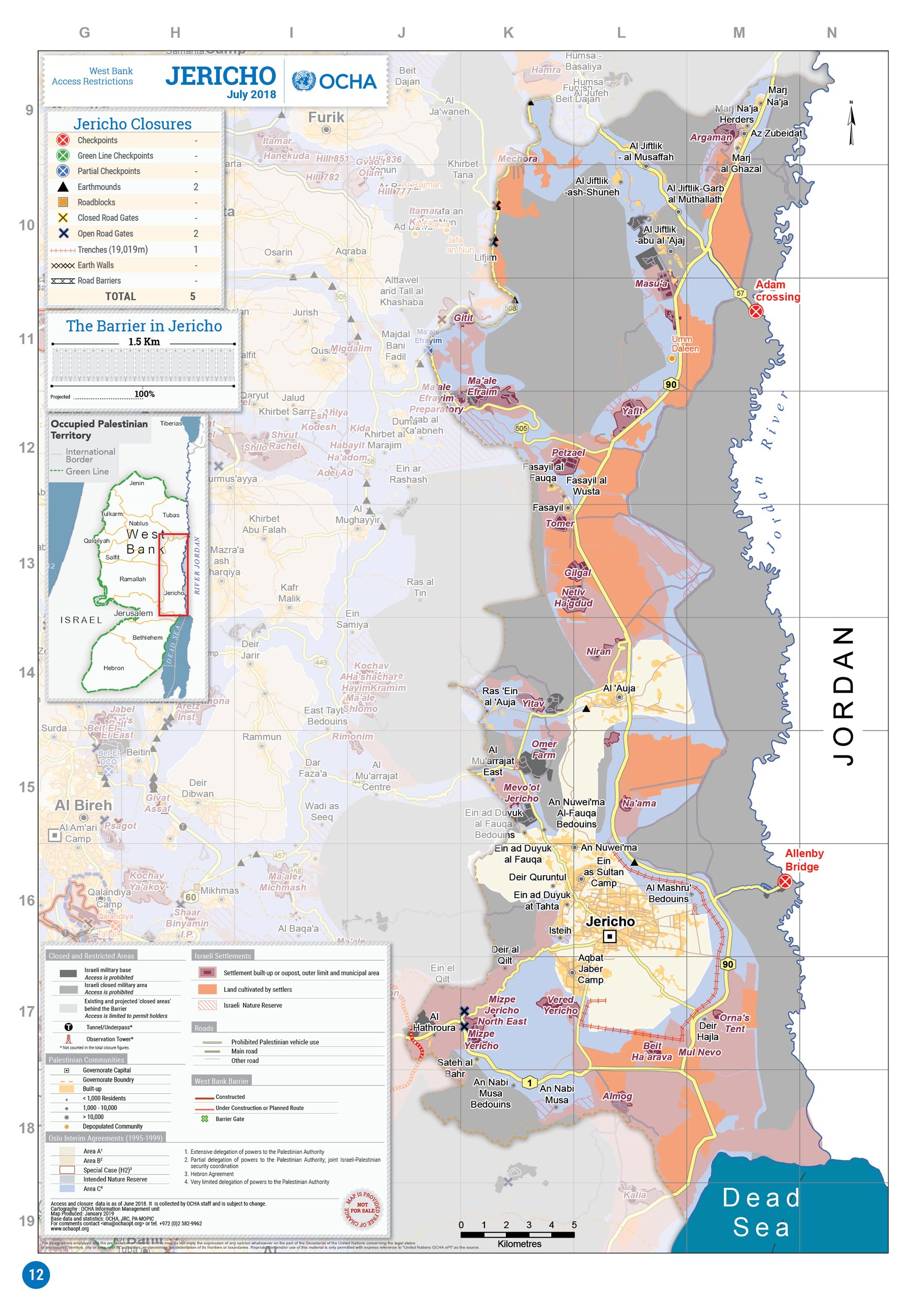
- 2018 United Nations map of the area, showing the Israeli occupation arrangements in the governorate
- Interactive map of Jericho Governorate
- Country: Palestine

Government
  - Governor: Hussein Hamayel

Area
  - Total: 608 km^{2} (235 sq mi)

Population (2017)
  - Total: 50,002
- This figure excludes the Israeli West Bank Settlements
- ISO 3166 code: PS-JRH

The Jericho Governorate (Arabic: محافظة أريحا, romanized: Muḥāfaẓat Arīḥā) is one of 16 Governorates of Palestine. Its capital is Jericho. The governorate is located along the eastern areas of the West Bank, along the northern Dead Sea and southern Jordan River valley bordering Jordan. It spans west to the mountains east of Ramallah and the eastern slopes of Jerusalem, including the northern reaches of the Judaean Desert. The population of the Jericho Governorate is estimated to be 50,002, including 13,334 Palestinian refugees in the governorate's camps.

Ein es-Sultan (also known as "Elisha's Spring") is an oasis in Jericho, one of the main tourist attractions in the area.

== Localities ==
=== Cities ===
- Jericho

=== Municipalities ===
- al-Auja
- al-Jiftlik

=== Villages ===
- Fasayil
- an-Nuway'imah
- Ein ad-Duyuk at-Tahta
- Ein ad-Duyuk al-Foqa
- az-Zubaidat
- Marj al-Ghazal

=== Refugee camps ===
- Aqabat Jaber
- Ein es-Sultan Camp
- Hisham's Palace Museum
- Ain Al-Auja Nature Reserve
