= Az-Zubaidat =

az-Zubaidat
- Municipality type D (Village council)

Arabic transcription(s)
  - Arabic: زبيدات
- Location of az-Zubaidat within Palestine
- Coordinates: 32°10′24″N 35°31′47″E
- Palestine grid: 199/175
- State: State of Palestine
- Governorate: Jericho

Government
  - Type: Village council

Population (2017)
  - Total: 1,679

az-Zubaidat (Arabic: زبيدات) is a Palestinian village in the Jericho Governorate in the eastern West Bank situated in the Jordan Valley, located 27 kilometers north of Jericho. According to the Palestinian Central Bureau of Statistics, az-Zubaidat had a population of over 1,679 inhabitants in 2017.

== Location ==
Az Zubeidat is located 35.4 kilometers (22.0 mi) (horizontally) north of Jericho. It is bordered by the Jordan River to the east, Marj Na'ja to the north, Tubas to the west, and Marj al Ghazal to the south.

== History ==
In the wake of the 1948 Arab–Israeli War, and after the 1949 Armistice Agreements, az-Zubaidat came under Jordanian rule. It was annexed by Jordan in 1950.

Since the Six-Day War in 1967, az-Zubaidat has been under Israeli occupation.

In 1970, Israel confiscated land from az-Zubaidat in order to construct the settlement of Argaman.

After the 1995 accords, 1% of the az-Zubaidat's land was classified as Area A, the remaining 99% as Area C.

In 1997, refugees constituted 96% of the population. The primary health care facilities for the village are designated by the Ministry of Health as level 2. In January 2010 Robert Fisk reported that the EU-funded installation of a wast-water system was stopped by the Israelis, as part of what he called "ethnic cleansing via bureaucracy".
