= Jad Isaac =

Director General of the Applied Research Institute–Jerusalem

- Born: 1 August 1947 (age 77); Beit Sahour, Palestine

Jad Elias Isaac (born 1 August 1947) is the Director General of the Applied Research Institute–Jerusalem since 1991.

He was educated at Cairo University (BSc, 1958), Rutgers University (MSc, 1974), and the University of East Anglia (PhD, 1979). He was previously Dean of Science at Bethlehem University.
