= Gilgal I =

- Location within the West Bank
- 32.032778°N 35.475556°E
- Type: Tell
- Periods: Neolithic (PPNA, PPNB)
- Cultures: Khiamian
- Location: West Bank
- Part of: Village

History
- Built: c. 11,400 BP
- Abandoned: c. 11,200 BP

Site notes
- Material: Charcoal, seeds
- Excavation dates: 1979-2005
- Archaeologists: Tamar Noy, Ofer Bar-Yosef, Mordechai E. Kislev, Anat Hartmann
- Public access: Yes

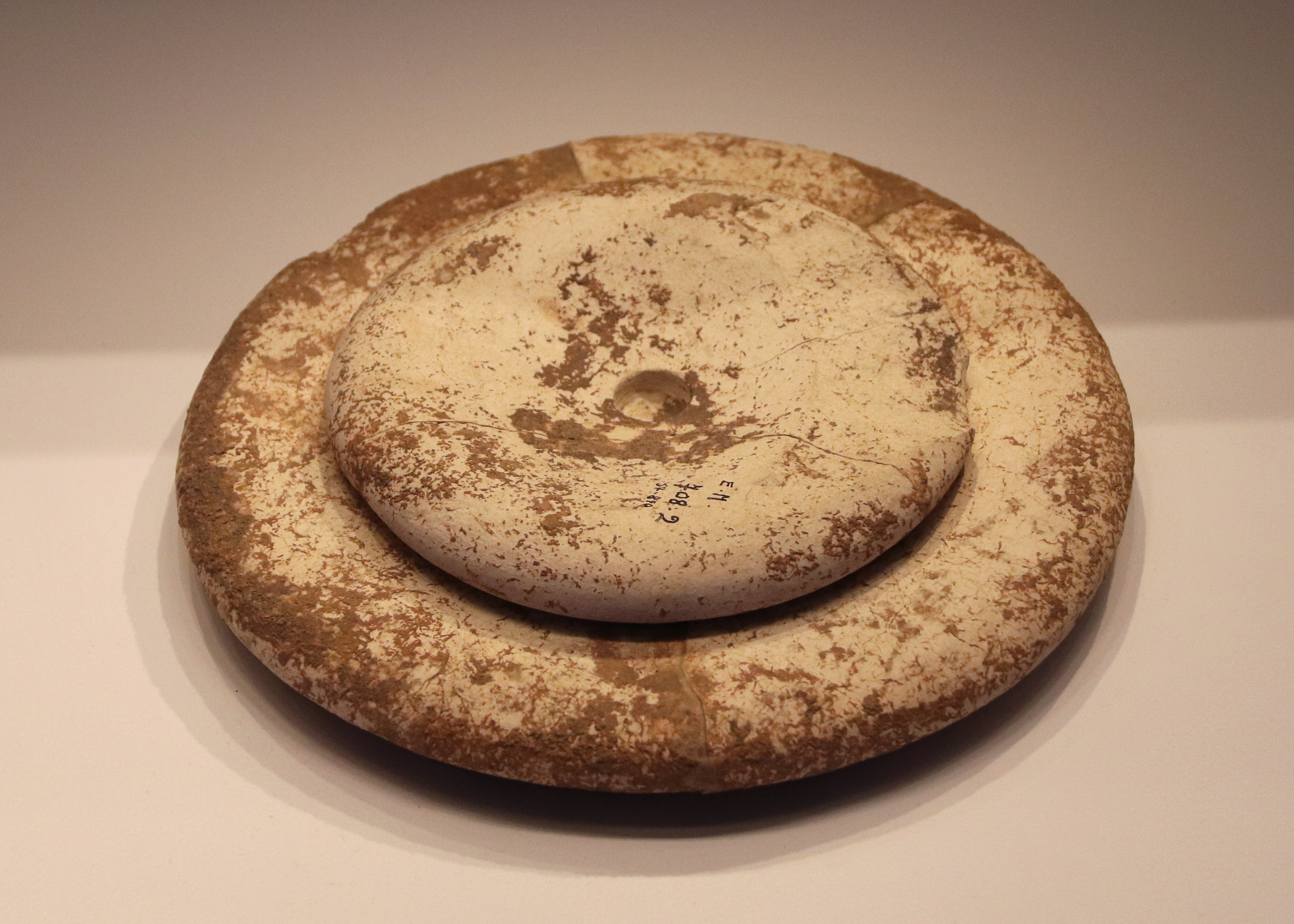
Grinding tool from Gilgal, Natufian culture, 12500-9500 BCE

Gilgal I (Hebrew: גלגל) is an archaeological site in the Jordan Valley, West Bank, dated to the early Neolithic period. The site is located 8 mi (13 km) north of ancient Jericho. The features and artifacts unearthed at Gilgal I shed important light on agriculture in the Levant. The by far oldest domesticated figs found anywhere in the world were recovered from an incinerated house at the site, and have been described as coming from cultivated, as opposed to wild, fig trees.

== Excavation history ==
Gilgal I was first excavated by Tamar Noy in 1979. Further excavations were conducted by Ofer Bar-Yosef of Harvard University, together with Mordechai E. Kislev and Anat Hartmann of Bar-Ilan University.

== Findings ==
The Early Neolithic village was inhabited for about two centuries before being abandoned some 11,200 years ago.

The archaeologists found caches of selectively propagated fig seeds, stored together with wild barley, wild oat, and acorns in quantities too large to be accounted for even by intensive gathering, at strata datable c. 11,000 years ago. The dig also unearthed the remains of thirteen round buildings made of mud and rock.

(Some of the plants tried and then abandoned during the Neolithic period in the Ancient Near East, at sites like Gilgal I, were later successfully domesticated in other parts of the world.)

=== Fig tree cultivation ===
At Gilgal, archaeologists found ancient carbonized figs stored in an 11,400-year-old house which appear to be a mutant "parthenocarpic" variety, adopted and cultivated for human consumption. The figs discovered at Gilgal lack embryonic seeds, a mutation that does not survive in nature more than a single generation. This suggests that the fig trees at Gilgal were artificially maintained by planting live branches in the ground, a horticultural technique known as vegetative propagation. Some fig remains recovered from other sites in the Middle East appear to be of the Gilgal variety.

This provides archaeobotanists with proof that agriculture may have started in the Ancient Near East with people domesticating the fig tree about one thousand years before managing to do the same with wheat, barley, and legumes. This pushes back the date of fig tree domestication by some 5,000 years earlier than thought, and makes figs the oldest domesticated crop we know of.

=== Clay objects ===
Pre-Pottery Neolithic A (PPNA) baked clay objects were discovered at Gilgal I, most of them figurines and symbolic artifacts. As some of the earliest ceramic findings in the Levant, they are of interest to archaeologists for their artistic, stylistic, symbolic and technological characteristics.

== Education center project ==
The Moreshet Foundation Israel (MHF Israel) has been working on developing the Gilgal Education Center in the Jordan Valley, a center open to the public that will highlight the importance of this archaeological site.

== See also ==
- Archaeology of Israel
- Gilgal (kibbutz)
- Levantine archaeology
