= Bik'at HaYarden Regional Council =

Israeli regional council in the West Bank

Coordinates: 32°6′N 35°30′E

Bik'at HaYarden בקעת הירדן
- Regional council (from 1979)
- Interactive map of Bik'at HaYarden
- Region: West Bank
- District: Judea and Samaria Area

Government
  - Head of Municipality: David Elhayani

Population (2024)
  - Total: 7,847
- Website: Official website

Bik'at HaYarden Regional Council (Hebrew: מועצה אזורית בקעת הירדן, Mo'atza Azorit Bik'at HaYarden, lit. Jordan Valley Regional Council), also Aravot HaYarden (lit. Jordan Plains), is a regional council covering 21 Israeli settlements in the Jordan Valley in the West Bank. The municipal territory of the council reaches from Mehola in the north, near the Beit She'an Valley, to Jericho in the south.

Most of the settlements are located on the two major north-south roads traversing the council's territory, the Allon Road on the west and Highway 90 on the east. The town of Ma'ale Efraim, a local council, is located within the regional council's borders, but constitutes an independent municipality. The regional council offices are located at the Shlomtzion regional centre.

As of 2023, David Elhayani is the head of the council.

== List of villages ==
This regional council provides various municipal services for the villages within its territory:

- Argaman (moshav)
- Beka'ot (moshav)
- Elisha (communal settlement)
- Gilgal (kibbutz)
- Gitit (moshav)
- Hamra (moshav)
- Hemdat (Nahal)
- Maskiot (communal settlement)
- Masua (moshav)
- Mehola (moshav)
- Mekhora (moshav)
- Mevo'ot Yericho (communal settlement)
- Netiv HaGdud (moshav)
- Na'ama (moshav)
- Na'aran (kibbutz)
- Petza'el (moshav)
- Ro'i (moshav)
- Rotem (communal settlement)
- Shadmot Mehola (moshav)
- Tomer (moshav)
- Yafit (moshav)
- Yitav (moshav)

== Demographics ==
Historical population
Year	Pop.	±%
1983	1,900	—
1995	2,500	+31.6%
2008	3,370	+34.8%
2022	6,831	+102.7%
2024	7,847	+14.9%

== Voting Patterns ==
In the 2022 election, 71 percent of voters in the regional council voted for the parties of the right-wing coalition led by Benjamin Netanyahu, while 29 percent voted for the parties of the center-left coalition led by Yair Lapid and 0.02 percent voted for the Arab parties.

In the 2026 election, 66 percent of voters in the regional council voted for the parties of the right-wing coalition led by Benjamin Netanyahu, while 22 percent voted for the parties of the center-left coalition led by Gadi Eisenkot and 0.1 percent voted for the Arab parties. An additional 4.5 percent voted for the Reservists, and 5.7 percent voted for Amcha Yisrael. Voter turnout increased 25 percent from the 2022 election.
