= Elisha (settlement) =

Israeli settlement near Jericho

Elisha: אלישע (Hebrew)
- Location within the Central West Bank
- Coordinates: 31°52′26″N 35°28′40″E
- Country: Israel
- District: Judea and Samaria Area
- Council: Bik'at HaYarden
- Region: West Bank
- Founded: 1982 (original); 2026 (re-establishment)

Elisha is a Israeli settlement near Jericho.

== History ==
The settlement was first established in March 1982 as a Nahal settlement, named first Perat and later Elisha. The Settlement was never transformed in to a civilian settlement, and in the beginning of the Second Intifada was made in to a military outpost, and later Abandoned.

In March 2026, The Security Cabinet of Israel approved re-establishing a settlement at the place. On October 2026 the first families moved in to the new settlement.
