= Ain Al-Auja Nature Reserve =

- Jericho Governorate
- Interactive map of Ain Al-Auja Nature Reserve
- Location: Jericho Governorate, Palestine
- Coordinates: 31°57′50″N 35°25′50″E
- Area: West Bank

Ein Al-Auja Nature Reserve (Arabic: محمية عين العوجا الطبيعية) is a nature reserve located in the Jericho Governorate in the West Bank, 11 km northeast of the city of Jericho. The name used by Israeli settlers is Yitav Reserve.

== Geography ==
It is bordered to the east by the Jordan River, to the north by the village of Fasayil, to the west by the lands of the villages of Kafr Malik and Deir Jarir, and to the south by An-Nuway'imah.

== Description ==
It extends over an area of 22,000 dunams, forming a beautiful natural oasis of trees, medicinal plants, and springs.

== Water ==
It includes the Ain al-Auja (also spelled 'Ein al-'Aujah, 'Ein el-'Aujah, Ein el-Auja etc.) spring, which springs from the eastern slopes of the Ramallah and al-Bireh Governorate, in the Ein Samiya area. It flows into long water channels that were once considered one of the largest tributaries of the Jordan River.

== See also ==
- Wadi Auja
