= Shadmot Mehola =

Israeli settlement in the West Bank

Shadmot Mehola: שַׁדְמוֹת מְחוֹלָה (Hebrew)
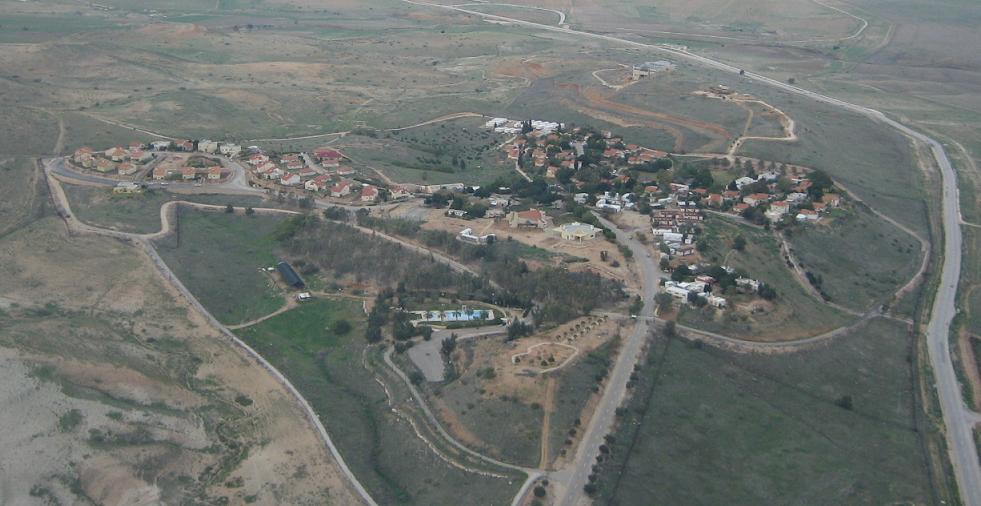

- Location within the Northern West Bank
- Coordinates: 32°20′54″N 35°32′0″E
- Country: Palestine
- District: Judea and Samaria Area
- Council: Bik'at HaYarden
- Region: West Bank
- Affiliation: Hapoel HaMizrachi
- Founded: 1979
- Founder: Nahal
- Population (2024): 771

Shadmot Mehola (Hebrew: שַׁדְמוֹת מְחוֹלָה, lit. 'Mehola Fields') is an Israeli settlement in the West Bank, organized as a national-religious moshav shitufi. Located in the Beit She'an Valley, it falls under the jurisdiction of Bik'at HaYarden Regional Council. In 2024 it had a population of 771.

The international community considers Israeli settlements in the West Bank illegal under international law, but the Israeli government disputes this.

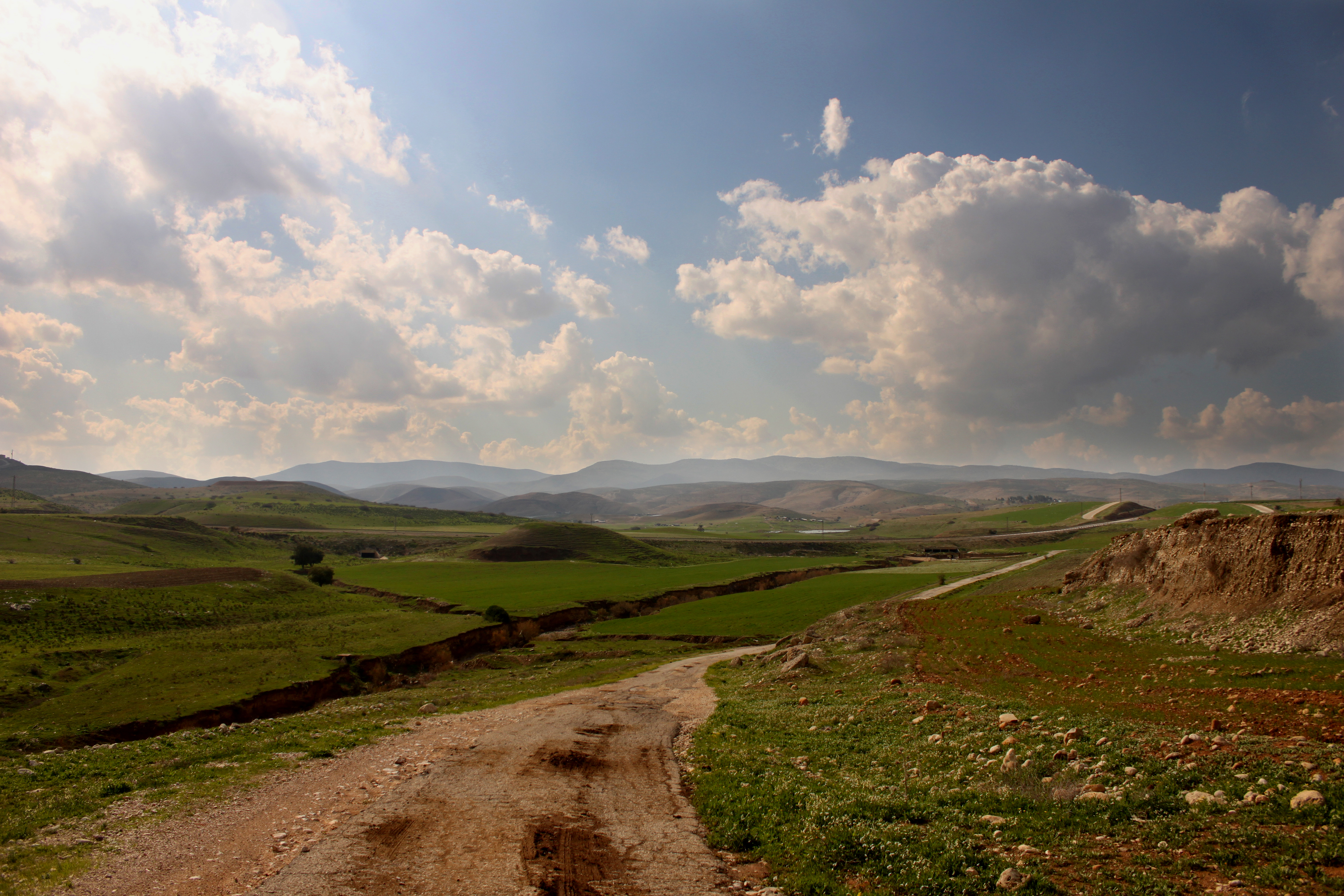
View around Shadmot Mehola

== History ==
The village was established as a Nahal settlement named Shelah in 1979, and was converted to a civilian settlement by residents of Mehola in 1984. As Mehola itself it was named after the biblical city of Abel-meholah (Judges 7:22, 1 Kings 4:12, 1 Kings 19:16), which was located in the area.
