= Mehola =

Israeli settlement in the West Bank

Mehola: מחולה (Hebrew)
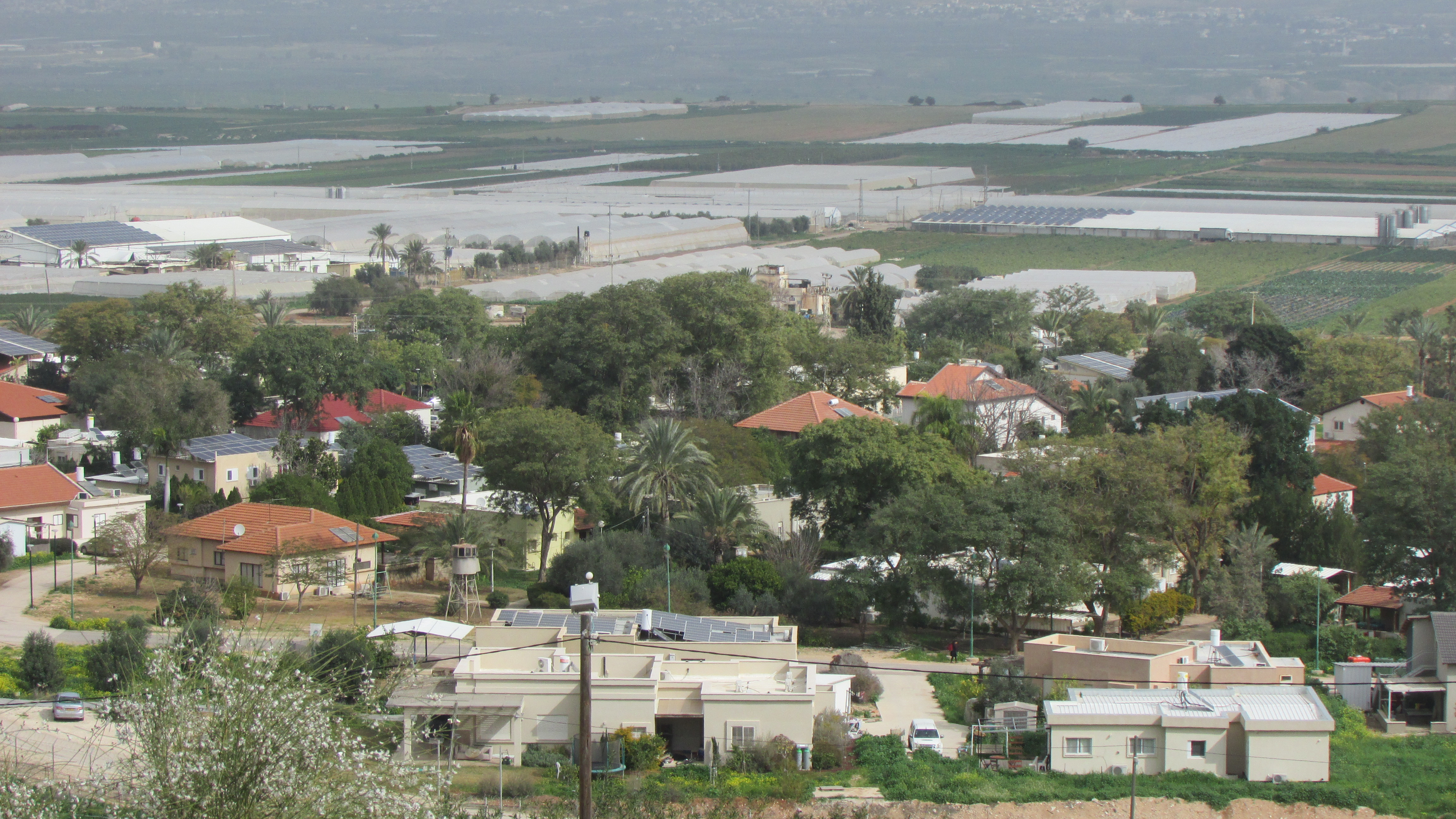

- Location within the Northern West Bank Location within the West Bank
- Coordinates: 32°21′57″N 35°30′52″E
- Country: Palestine
- District: Judea and Samaria Area
- Council: Bik'at HaYarden
- Region: West Bank
- Affiliation: Hapoel HaMizrachi
- Founded: 1967
- Founder: Bnei Akiva members
- Population (2024): 789
- Website: www.mechola.co.il

Mehola (Hebrew: מחולה) is a religious moshav and Israeli settlement in the West Bank. Located in the Jordan Valley near the Green Line and the Palestinian village of Bardala, it falls under the jurisdiction of Bik'at HaYarden Regional Council. With an area of 5,000 dunams, in 2024 it had a population of 789.

The international community considers Israeli settlements in the West Bank illegal under international law, but the Israeli government disputes this.

== History ==
The village was established in 1967 by Bnei Akiva members. It was named after the biblical city of Abel-meholah (Judges 7:22, 1 Kings 4:12, 1 Kings 19:16), which was located in the area.

The inhabitants of Mehola cultivate some of the village lands of the depopulated Palestinian village of Al-Fatur. According to some inhabitants of the nearby Palestinian village of Ein al-Beida, some of their land was fenced off shortly after the 1967 war, and afterwards used by the settlers of Mehola. In 2026 it was documented that some products from Mehola was falsely exported as being made in Israel.

In 1993, it was the site of Mehola Junction bombing.

In June 2012, the outpost Givat Sal'it (Hebrew: גבעת סלעית) in the northern Jordan Valley was retroactively legalised by redesignating it as a neighbourhood of Mehola, from which it is separated by a major inter-city highway.

== See also ==
- Shadmot Mehola
