= Archelais =

Ancient town in the Jordan Valley

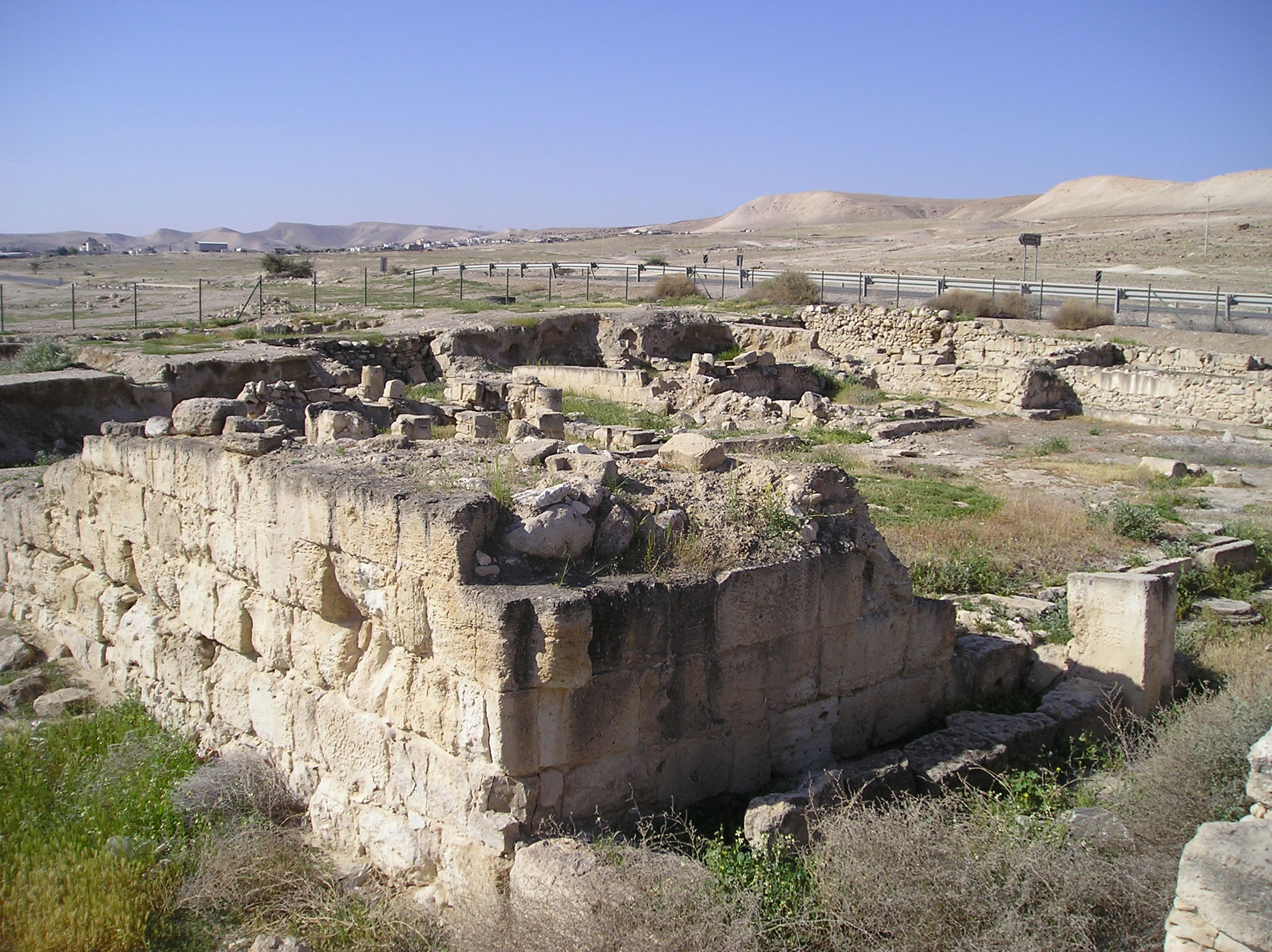
Ruins of Byzantine church in Archelais, Palestine (2006)

Archelaïs (Ancient Greek: Ἀρχελαΐς) was a town in the Roman province of Judaea/Palaestina, corresponding to modern Khirbet el-Beiyudat (also spelled Khirbat al-Bayudat). It was founded by Herod the Great's son Archelaus to house workers for his date plantation in the Jericho area. It is represented on the Madaba mosaic map with a towered entrance flanked by two other towers.

== Geography ==
Archelaïs was located about 7.5 miles north of Jericho, on the road leading to Scythopolis.

== History ==
Archelais was founded by Archelaus, son of Herod the Great and ethnarch of Judea, Samaria, and Idumea. Salome bequeathed it to Livia in her will.

Agrippa I, king of Judaea in the early 40s CE, established a road station at Archelais.

In Christian times, the town became a bishopric. The names of two of its bishops: Timotheus, who took part in two anti-Eutyches synods held in Constantinople in 448 and 449, and Antiochus, who was at the Council of Chalcedon in 451.

No longer a residential bishopric, Archelaïs is today listed by the Catholic Church as a titular see.

Inscriptions on the floor of a church discovered among the ruins of the town indicate that it was paved with Byzantine mosaics during the 560s.

== Current destruction ==
Archelaïs is identified with Khirbet el-Beiyudat, an archaeological site, standing at the northern outskirts of the Palestinian West Bank town of al-Auja (31°57′58″N 35°28′18″E). The site is gradually being covered by modern construction and devastated by treasure hunters.
