= Area C =

Oslo II division of the West Bank under full Israeli control

Area C שטח C منطقة ج
- West Bank area under the Oslo II Accord
- Interactive map of Area C
- Part of: Judea and Samaria Area
- Established: 1995
- Largest city: Modi'in Illit (89,627 as of 2024)

Area
  - Total: 3,516 km^{2} (1,358 sq mi)
- Elevation (Note: Tall Asur): 1,016 m (3,333 ft)

Population
  - 2023 estimate: 491,548 Israelis; 354,000 Palestinians
- Currency: Israeli new shekel (ILS)

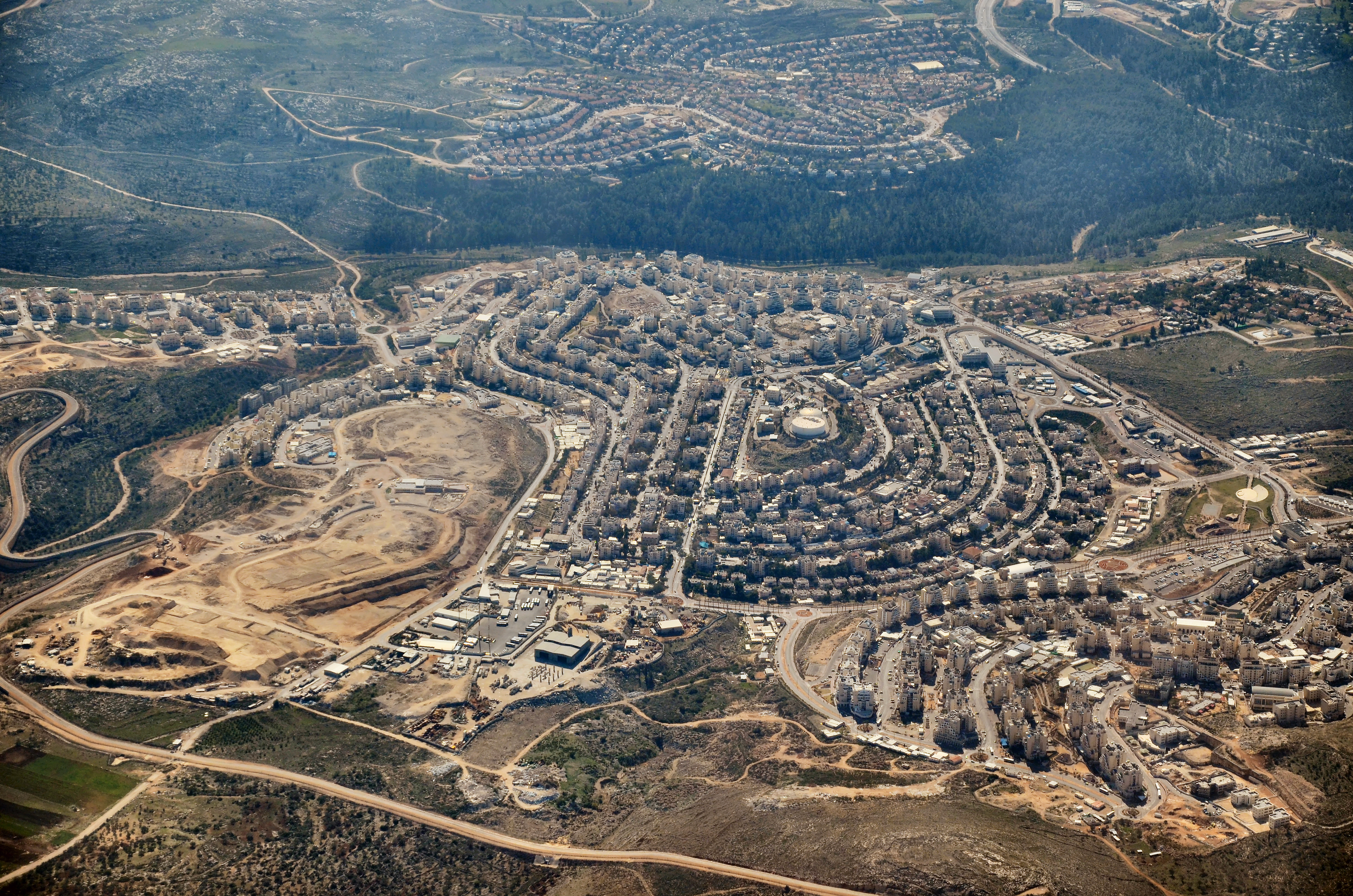
Modi'in Illit

Area C (Hebrew: שטח C, romanized: Shetakh C; Arabic: منطقة ج, romanized: minṭaqa jīm) is the fully Israeli-controlled territory in the West Bank, defined as the whole area outside the Palestinian enclaves (Areas A and B). Area C constitutes about 61 percent of the West Bank territory, containing most Israeli settlements other than those in East Jerusalem, and more than 99% of the area is off limits or heavily restricted for Palestinians. The area was committed in 1995 under the Oslo II Accord to be "gradually transferred to Palestinian jurisdiction" (with an option for land swaps under a final agreement), but such transfer did not happen. The area is richly endowed with natural resources.

Area C, along with the rest of the West Bank, has been under Israeli military control since 1967. In 2023, Area C was home to 491,548 Israeli settlers and 354,000 Palestinians. The Jewish population in Area C is administered by the Israeli Judea and Samaria Area administration, into which Israeli law is "pipelined", whereas the Palestinian population is directly administered by the Israeli Coordinator of Government Activities in the Territories (COGAT) and is under military law. The Palestinian Authority is responsible for medical and educational services to Palestinians in Area C; however, infrastructure construction and supervision is done by Israel.

The international community considers the settlements in occupied territory to be illegal, (Note: Attributed to multiple references:) and the United Nations has repeatedly upheld the view that Israel's construction of settlements constitutes a violation of the Fourth Geneva Convention. (Note: Attributed to multiple references:) Israel disputes the position of the international community and the legal arguments that were used to declare the settlements illegal. The "outposts" are in contravention of Israeli law as well, although International law does not recognize any distinction between "legal" and "illegal" settlements.

== History ==
The Israeli Civil Administration was established by the government of Israel in 1981, in order to carry out practical bureaucratic functions within the territories occupied by Israel since 1967. While formally separate, it was subordinate to the Israeli military and the Shin Bet.

The Civil Administration is a part of a larger entity known as Coordinator of Government Activities in the Territories (COGAT), which is a unit in the Defense Ministry of Israel. Its functions have largely been taken over by the Palestinian National Authority in 1994, however it still continues a limited operation to manage Palestinian population in the Area C of the West Bank and coordination with the Palestinian government.

== Oslo Accords ==
The Oslo II Accord divided the West Bank into three administrative divisions: the Areas A, B and C. The distinct areas were given a different status, according to the amount of self-government the local Palestinians would have over it through the Palestinian Authority, until a final status accord would be established.

The Areas A and B were chosen in such a way as to just contain Palestinians, by drawing lines around Palestinian population centers at the time the Agreement was signed; Area C was defined as "areas of the West Bank outside Areas A and B, which, except for the issues that will be negotiated in the permanent status negotiations, will be gradually transferred to Palestinian jurisdiction in accordance with this Agreement." Area A comprises approximately 18% of the West Bank and Area B about 22%, together home to some 2.8 million Palestinians.

Area C was initially around 72–74% (first phase, 1995) of the West Bank. Under the 1998 Wye River Memorandum, Israel would further withdraw from some additional 13% from Area C to Area B, which officially reduced Area C to circa 61% of the West Bank. Israel, however, withdrew from only 2%, and during Operation Defensive Shield, it reoccupied all territory. As of 2013, Area C formally comprised about 63% of the West Bank, including settlements, outposts and declared "state land". Including or excluding East Jerusalem, no-man's land and the Palestinian part of the Dead Sea also determines the percentage.

== Geography, resources and policy ==
Area C is richly endowed with natural resources, including most of Palestinian agricultural and grazing land. It is the only contiguous part of the West Bank, thus all large scale projects involve work in Area C. There are more than 3,500 archaeological sites in Area C.

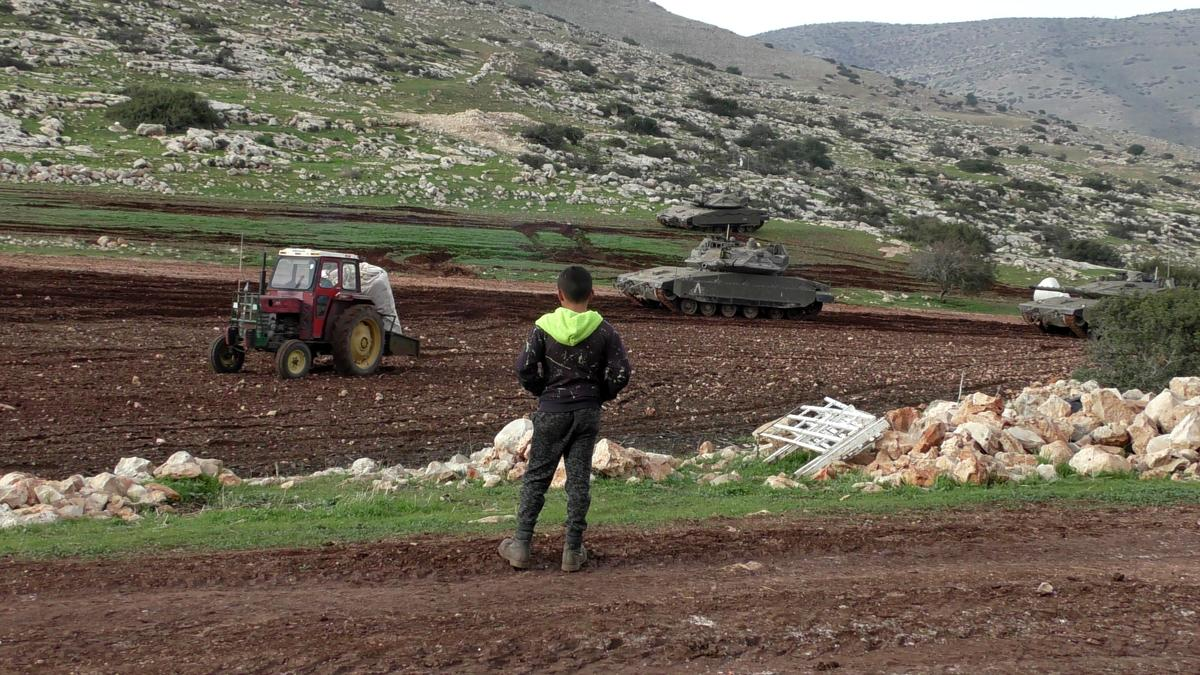
Israeli tank training in the fields of Khirbet Ibziq Palestinian village, December 2021

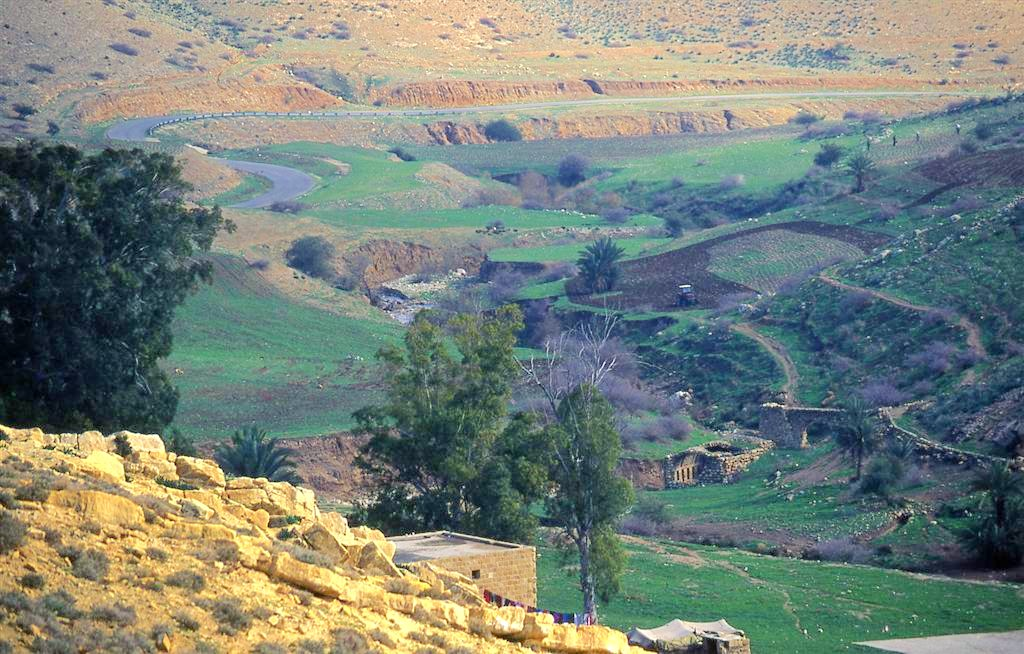
The stream of Wadi el-Maleh

== Settlements and housing policy ==
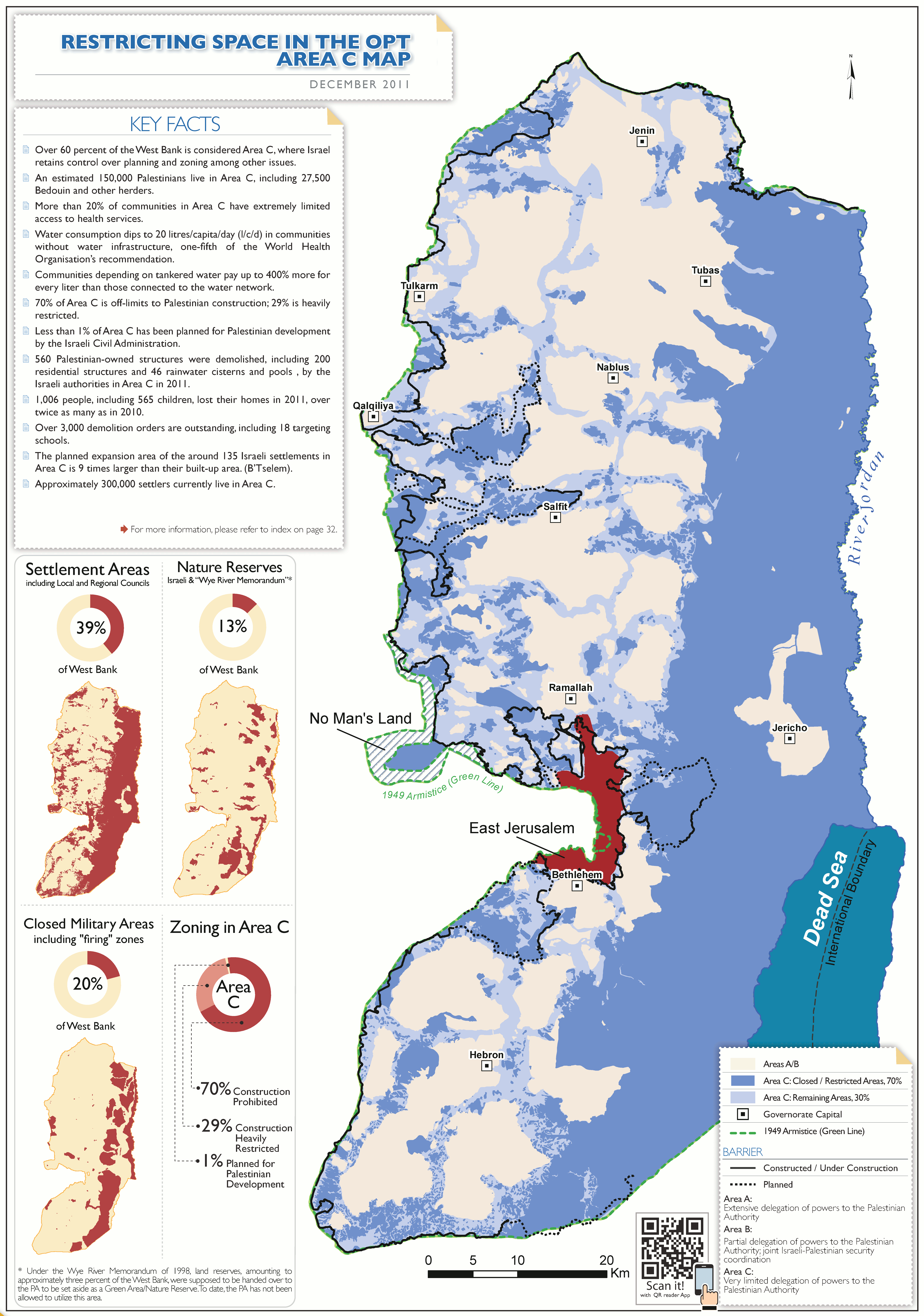
Area C in blue and light blue. East Jerusalem in red

Map of Israeli settlements, as of 2025

Area C (not including East Jerusalem) is home to 491,548 Israeli settlers and 354,000 Palestinians. According to the Norwegian Refugee Council, Israeli planning and zoning regimes in Area C all but prohibit Palestinian construction in almost 70 percent this zone, and render the obtaining of permits in the remaining 30 percent nearly impossible.

Israel strictly controls Palestinian settlement, construction and development in Area C.in the 12 years from 2000 to 2012, only 211 Palestinian submissions for Israeli permits, out of 3,750 applications (5.6%) – were approved. The figure tails off for the last 4 years, 2009 through 2012 with 37 permits given from among 1,640 applications (2.3%). By contrast, the same Civil Administration figures indicate that in approximately 75% of Israeli settlements, construction was undertaken without regard for the appropriate permits.

According to a UNOCHA report, "The planning and zoning regime applied by the Israeli authorities, including the ways in which public land is allocated, makes it virtually impossible for Palestinians to obtain building permits in most of Area C. Even basic residential and livelihood structures, such as a tent or a fence, require a building permit." According to B'tselem:

Israel strictly limits Palestinian settlement, construction and development in Area C, while ignoring the needs of the Palestinian population. This policy means Palestinian residents must subsist in very rudimentary living conditions. They are denied any legal avenue to build homes or develop their communities, so they face the constant fear that their homes might be demolished, and that they be expelled and lose their livelihood.

Israel routinely issued demolition orders on Palestinian structures built without permits. Between 1988 and 2014, Israel issued 14,087 demolition orders, of which only a minority (20%) have been executed. The remaining orders do not expire, leaving the structures in a continuous state of uncertainty.

=== Positions on demolitions ===
According to the Article 53 of the Fourth Geneva Conventions:

Any destruction by the Occupying Power of real or personal property belonging individually or collectively to private persons, or to the State, or to other public authorities, or to social or cooperative organizations, is prohibited, except where such destruction is rendered absolutely necessary by military operations.

Israeli demolitions are based on British mandate planning rules, which are evoked to justify demolitions, but at the same time Israel does not employ the Mandatory provisions for the granting of construction permits, according to B'tselem.

Israel defends its policy on three grounds. Firstly, it states that the demolitions satisfy Jordanian law, which was operative at the time Israel occupied the territories. Secondly, it states that its actions satisfy Article 43 of the Hague conventions. Thirdly, it states that under the 1995 Oslo Accords, it was agreed that planning and zoning in Area C would fall under the appropriate planning committees. Israel also defends demolitions in terms of the safety of the inhabitants of homes it demolishes because they have been built in closed military zones or firing zones. Israel has defined roughly 20% of the entire West Bank as "closed military areas" and 60% of the demolitions in 2010 took place in the latter.

Critics respond that the declaration of areas as Israeli closed military zones is a legal device adopted by the military authorities to deny Palestinians access to their land. B'tselem claims that the refusal of the military-run Civil Administration to set down development plans for Palestinian villages are based variously on arguments that such sites are either situated near archaeological areas, that communities can relocate to nearby Palestinian land reserves, and that what it defines as "collections of illegal structures", though villages, were not planned. These arguments are applied when issuing demolition orders for villages that are built on village land, and have existed for decades.

== See also ==
- Status of territories occupied by Israel in 1967
- Zionism as settler colonialism
- Israeli settler violence
