= Applied Research Institute–Jerusalem =

Palestinian non-governmental organization

Applied Research Institute Jerusalem
- Abbreviation: ARIJ
- Formation: 1990
- Location: Bethlehem, West Bank
- Official language: Arabic, English
- Director: Jad Isaac
- Staff: 60
- Website: www.arij.org

The Applied Research Institute - Jerusalem (ARIJ; Arabic: معهد الابحاث التطبيقية - القدس, romanized: Maʻhad al-Abḥāth al-Taṭbīqīyah al-Quds) is a Palestinian NGO founded in 1990 with its main office in Bethlehem in the West Bank. ARIJ is actively working on research projects in the fields of management of natural resources, water management, sustainable agriculture and political dynamics of development in the Palestinian Territories.

== Projects ==
=== POICA ===
Together with the Land Research Center (LRC), ARIJ runs a joint project named 'POICA', Eye on Palestine–Monitoring Israeli Colonizing activities in the Palestinian Territories. The project, funded by the European Union, inspects and scrutinizes Israeli colonizing activities in the West Bank and Gaza, and disseminates the related information to policy makers in the European countries and to the general public.

=== Sustainable waste treatment ===
In 2011 ARIJ, along with the TTZ Bremerhaven, the University of Extremadura, and the Institute on Membrane Technology of the Italian National Research Council (CNR-ITM) started a project with the title of "Sustainable Treatment and Valorization of Olive Mill Waste in Palestine". The project is funded by the European Union under the Seventh Framework Programme.

=== Funders ===
- Spanish Agency for International Development Cooperation
