= Ptolemy Macron =

Hellenistic Greek official (2nd ct. BCE)

Ptolemy Macron (fl. 2nd century BCE) was a Greek official in the Hellenistic era. He first served the Ptolemaic Kingdom as governor of the island Cyprus. During the Sixth Syrian War between the Seleucid Empire under King Antiochus IV Epiphanes and the Ptolemaic Kingdom under King Ptolemy VI Philometor, he surrendered Cyprus to an invading Seleucid fleet, betraying the Ptolemies and joining the Seleucid Empire. Roman intervention to end the war would require that the Seleucids hand Cyprus back to the Ptolemies, meaning Ptolemy Macron thereafter served the Seleucids in their empire in Coele-Syria and Phoenicia as governor (strategos) there. However, with the death of King Antiochus IV and his replacement by Lysias as regent, he apparently fell out of favor with the Seleucid court. His death around 162 BCE was attributed to suicide.

The books of Maccabees refer both to a "Ptolemy, who was called Macron" who acted positively toward the Jews and a commander called "Ptolemy son of Dorymenes" who led troops into battle against the rebel Jews at the Battle of Emmaus. Scholars disagree on whether these passages refer to a single person or to two separate people.

== Primary sources ==
The most important surviving sources on Ptolemy are 1 Maccabees and 2 Maccabees, both books written from a Jewish perspective. Additionally, Polybius's The Histories provides crucial background material about the Sixth Syrian War, and his background appears elsewhere in Polybius along with other epigraphical writings. An intriguing possibility from these writings is that his name may come from his grandfather: one of these inscriptions marks a "Ptolemy son of Ptolemy son of Macron", potentially the same person as Ptolemy Macron. He seems to have served as governor of the island of Cyprus for the Ptolemaic Kingdom from around 180–168 BCE. There are also some derivative, later sources: a mention in Josephus's Jewish Antiquities, albeit likely paraphrased from the mention in 1 Maccabees, as well as a brief biography in the Suda.

2 Maccabees 8 refers to a figure called "Ptolemy, the governor of Coelesyria and Phoenicia" and says this Ptolemy appointed Nicanor to fight against the early stages of the Maccabean Revolt that Judas Maccabeus had started. A more interesting section happens in Chapter 10, which describes a short biography as well as his death after Lysias takes control of the Empire as regent and Gorgias is appointed the new governor of Coele-Syria:

Ptolemy, who was called Macron, took the lead in showing justice to the Jews because of the wrong that had been done to them, and attempted to maintain peaceful relations with them. As a result he was accused before Eupator by the king's Friends. He heard himself called a traitor at every turn, because he had abandoned Cyprus, which Philometor had entrusted to him, and had gone over to Antiochus Epiphanes. Unable to command the respect due to his office, he took poison and ended his life.

— 2 Maccabees 10:12-13 (NRSV)

Some passages refer to a "Ptolemy son of Dorymenes", who some scholars suggest may be the same person. 2 Maccabees 4 recounts a story that the corrupt High Priest Menelaus paid a bribe to Ptolemy son of Dorymenes, one of the king's advisors, to avoid punishment for his misdeeds. According to 1 Maccabees 3:38-39, Lysias selected Ptolemy son of Dorymenes, Nicanor, and Gorgias as commanders of the Seleucid force that would eventually fight in the Battle of Emmaus (c. 165 BCE).

== Analysis ==
The argument that Ptolemy Macron and Ptolemy the son of Dorymenes are the same person is simple: what is the likelihood of two separate men of the same name governing consecutively in the same Seleucid province? If Ptolemy son of Dorymenes really is the same person as Ptolemy Macron, it suggests he changed his stance toward the Jews later in his life, given the positive tone 2 Maccabees adopts toward his conciliatory policies.

There are objections to this identification on both chronological and psychological grounds. Terence Mitford cites a story in 2 Maccabees. In it, Menelaus is accused of crimes and then bribes Ptolemy son of Dorymenes. The incident seems to take place around 170 BCE, which is a bit too soon for Ptolemy Macron to have defected and for Cyprus to have been conquered. The sudden switch in stances can also be taken as reason to see them as separate people. Bezalel Bar-Kochva writes that "after the defeat at Ammaus, Ptolemy son of Dorymenes was dismissed and replaced by Ptolemy Macron". After the humiliating defeat at Emmaus in 165 BCE, the name "son of Dorymenes" is not seen again, and dismissing this commander for his failure would have been a reasonable step to take. Ptolemy Macron, conversely, was a respected administrator who likely would have had many opportunities to know and meet Jews through his family in Alexandria. He may also have brought defecting troops with him to Syria; 2 Maccabees 4:29 mentions "Cypriot troops" in the region. Having a three year "cooling off" period while the Seleucids made sure he was not going to defect back to the Ptolemies would be a reasonable move to make before placing him in a high position worthy of his experience.
