= 166 BC =

166 BC in various calendars
- Gregorian calendar: 166 BC; CLXVI BC
- Ab urbe condita: 588
- Ancient Egypt era: XXXIII dynasty, 158
- Pharaoh: Ptolemy VI Philometor, 15
- Ancient Greek Olympiad (summer): 153rd Olympiad, year 3
- Assyrian calendar: 4585
- Balinese saka calendar: N/A
- Bengali calendar: −759 – −758
- Berber calendar: 785
- Buddhist calendar: 379
- Burmese calendar: −803
- Byzantine calendar: 5343–5344
- Chinese calendar: 甲戌年 (Wood Dog); 2532 or 2325 — to — 乙亥年 (Wood Pig); 2533 or 2326
- Coptic calendar: −449 – −448
- Discordian calendar: 1001
- Ethiopian calendar: −173 – −172
- Hebrew calendar: 3595–3596
- Hindu calendars
- Vikram Samvat: −109 – −108
- Shaka Samvat: N/A
- Kali Yuga: 2935–2936
- Holocene calendar: 9835
- Iranian calendar: 787 BP – 786 BP
- Islamic calendar: 811 BH – 810 BH
- Javanese calendar: N/A
- Julian calendar: N/A
- Korean calendar: 2168
- Minguo calendar: 2077 before ROC 民前2077年
- Nanakshahi calendar: −1633
- Seleucid era: 146/147 AG
- Thai solar calendar: 377–378
- Tibetan calendar: ཤིང་ཕོ་ཁྱི་ལོ་ (male Wood-Dog) −39 or −420 or −1192 — to — ཤིང་མོ་ཕག་ལོ་ (female Wood-Boar) −38 or −419 or −1191

Year 166 BC was a year of the pre-Julian Roman calendar. At the time it was known as the Year of the Consulship of Marcellus and Galus (or, less frequently, year 588 Ab urbe condita). The denomination 166 BC for this year has been used since the early medieval period, when the Anno Domini calendar era became the prevalent method in Europe for naming years.

== Events ==
=== By place ===
==== Seleucid Empire ====
- The Seleucid king Antiochus IV mounts a campaign against the Parthians who are threatening his empire in the east. He leaves his chancellor, Lysias, with responsibility for the government of southern Syria and the guardianship of his son.
- The leader of the Jewish revolt against Syria rule, Mattathias, dies and his third son, Judas, assumes leadership of the revolt in accordance with the deathbed deposition of his father.
- The Battle of Beth Horon is fought between Jewish forces led by Judas Maccabeus and a Seleucid army. Maccabeus gains the element of surprise and successfully routs the much larger Syrian army.
- The Battle of Emmaus takes place between the Jewish rebels led by Judas Maccabeus and Seleucid forces sent by Antiochus IV and led by Lysias and his general, Gorgias. In the ensuing battle, Judas Maccabeus and his men succeed in repelling Gorgias and forcing his army out of Judea and down to the coastal plain in what is an important victory in the war for Judea's independence.

==== Roman Republic ====
- The Roman playwright Terence's Andria (The Girl from Andros) is first performed.

==== China ====
- Laoshang leads 140,000 Xiongnu cavalry in a raid in Anding, and they reach as far as the royal retreat at Yong.

== Deaths ==
- Mattathias, father of Judas Maccabaeus, Jewish priest from Modi'in, near Jerusalem, who has started and briefly led a rebellion by the Jews in Judea against the Seleucid kingdom of Syria
- Perseus, the last Macedonian king of the Antigonid dynasty (b. c. 212 BC)
