= Ma'ale Levona =

Israeli settlement in the West Bank

Ma'ale Levona: מַעֲלֵה לְבוֹנָה (Hebrew)

Hebrew transcription(s)
  - Unofficial: Maaleh Levonah
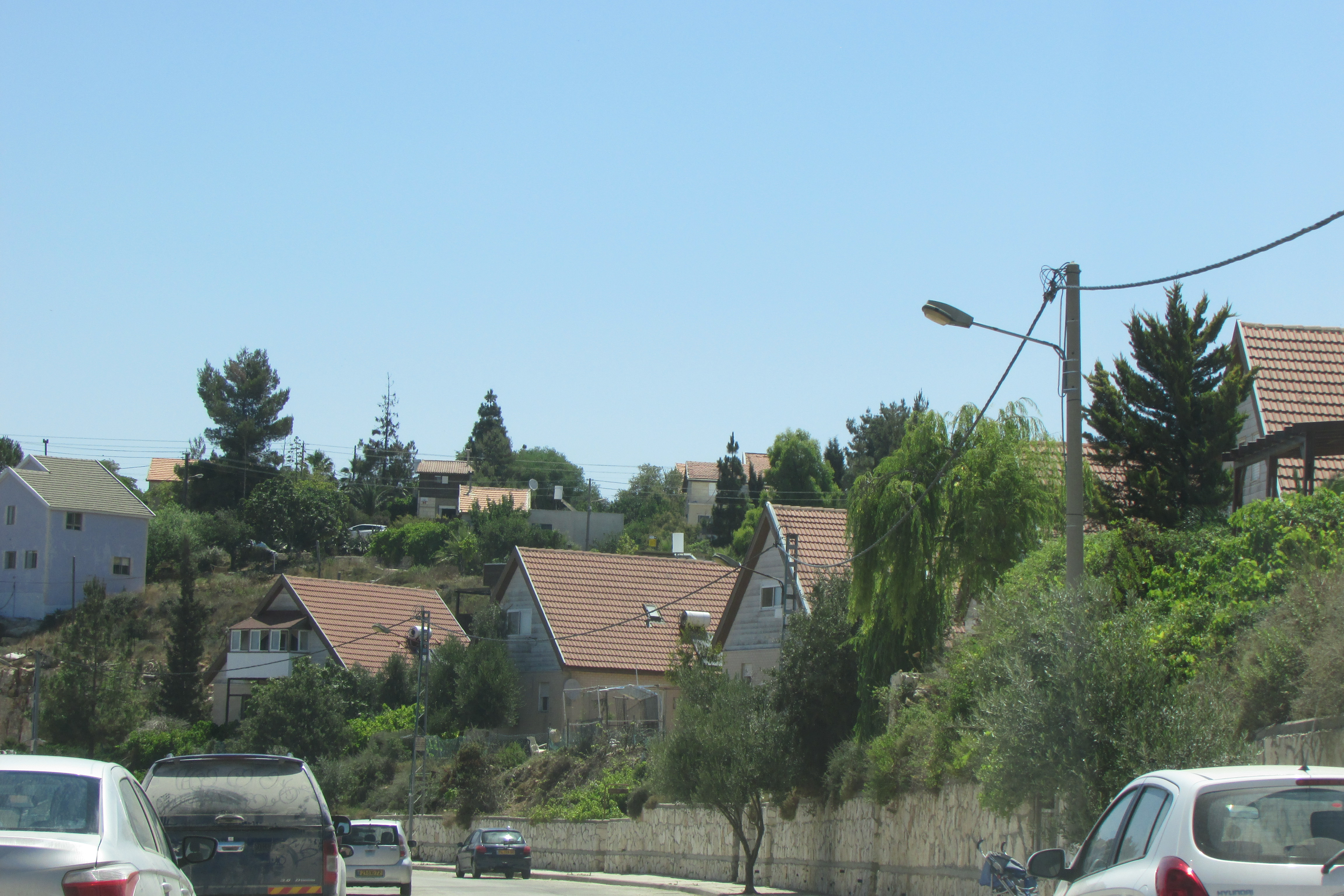

- Location within the Central West Bank
- Coordinates: 32°03′16″N 35°14′27″E
- Country: Palestine
- District: Judea and Samaria Area
- Council: Mateh Binyamin
- Region: West Bank
- Affiliation: Amana
- Founded: 1983
- Population (2024): 1,006

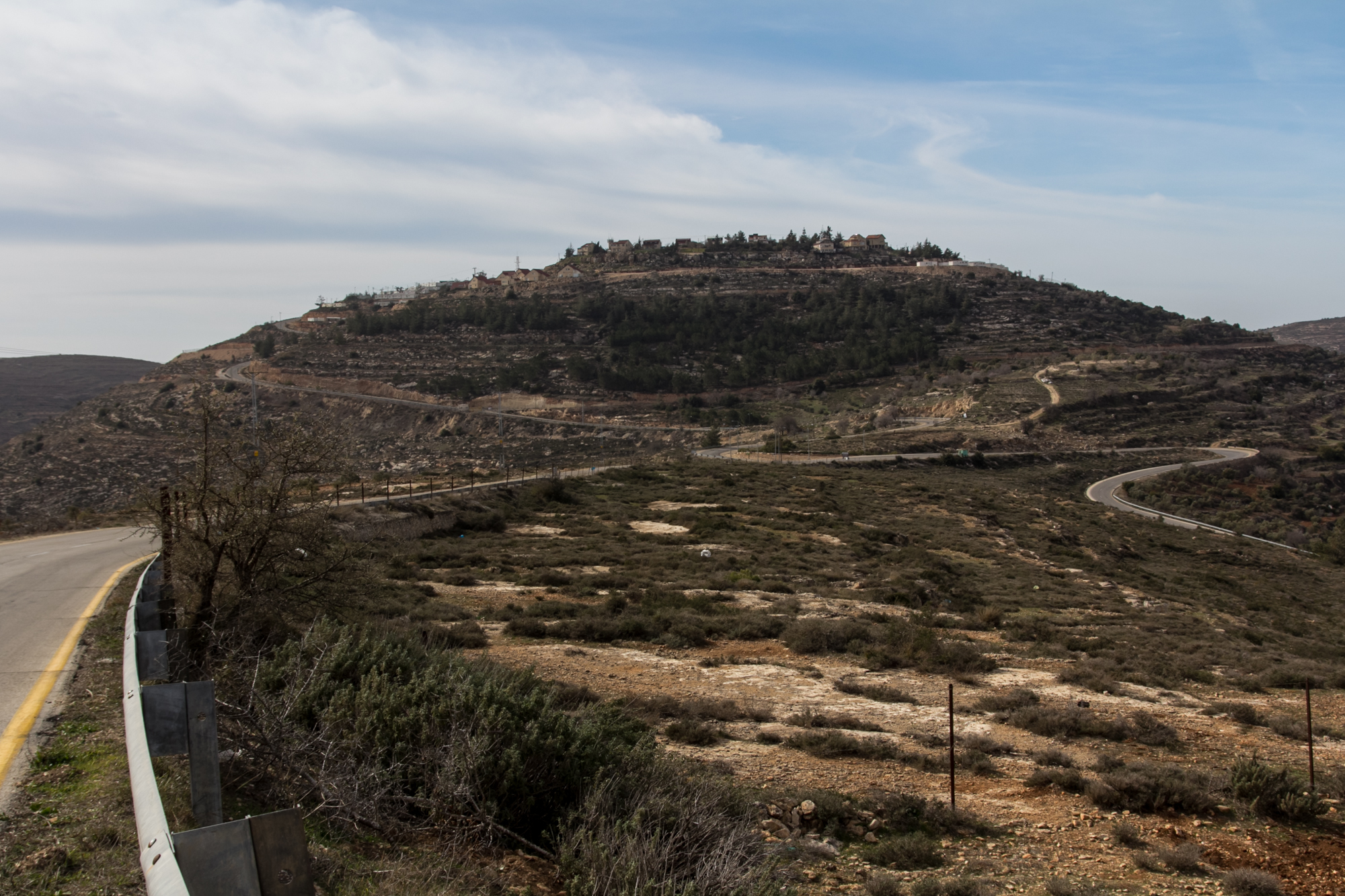

Ma'ale Levona (Hebrew: מַעֲלֵה לְבוֹנָה, lit. Ascent of Frankincense) is an Israeli settlement organized as a community settlement in the West Bank. Located to the south-east of Ariel, it falls under the jurisdiction of Mateh Binyamin Regional Council. In 2024, it had a population of 1,006.

The international community considers Ma'ale Levona and other Israeli settlements in the West Bank illegal under international law. However, the Israeli government disputes this.

== Etymology ==
The valley may be named for the frankincense grown there in Biblical days for the incense used in the Tabernacle of near-by Shiloh. There was an Israelite village on the edge of the valley that also bore the name "Levonah" (Judges 21:19). The name of that ancient site is preserved in the name of the Palestinian village Al-Lubban ash-Sharqiya (Eastern Lubban), on part of whose land Ma'ale Levona is constructed.

== History in antiquity ==
Khirbet el-Qutt, an archeological site, is situated directly north of Ma'ale Levona. Archaeologists suggest that it was a fortified Jewish village in the late Second Temple period. Three mikvehs, a hiding complex and a necropolis were found at the site. A fort or monastery was constructed on the site's eastern slopes during the Late Roman or Byzantine period.

Another archaeological site, Khirbet Ghuraba, possibly the ancient Garob, is located across the wadi to the south.

Ma'ale Levona overlooks the ancient mountain pass noteworthy as the site of the Battle of Ascent of Lebonah, the first battle of the Maccabees against the Selucids in what is known as the Maccabean Revolt (167–160 BCE).

The mountain pass, the "Ascent of Levonah" is to the east of the village, and links the Levonah valley to its north with the Shiloh valley to its south. Judah Maccabee killed the Samarian mysarch Apollonius in this battle, taking his sword for himself.

The archeologists suggested identifying the site with Lakitia, mentioned in Lamentations Rabbah as one of the three stations set up by Hadrian to catch fugitives after the Bar Kokhba revolt.

== Modern history ==
According to ARIJ, Israel confiscated land from 3 neighbouring Palestinian villages in order to construct Ma'ale Levona:

- 447 dunams from Sinjil,
- 229 dunams from Al-Lubban ash-Sharqiya,
- 72 dunams from Abwein.

Ma'ale Levona was initially established as an outpost for the Nahal program. It later became a civilian settlement under the municipal jurisdiction of the Matte Binyamin Regional Council. It is located in the northern West Bank, in the Shilo-Eli bloc near Ariel. Ma'ale Levona is home to around 120 families.
