= Battle of Beth Horon =

The Battle of Beth Horon may refer to:

- Battle of Beth Horon (166 BC), between Jewish forces led by Judas Maccabaeus and a Seleucid Empire force in the Maccabean Revolt
- Battle of Beth Horon (66), between the Roman army and Jewish rebels in the First Jewish-Roman War
