= Battle of the Ascent of Lebonah =

Battle of the Maccabean Revolt

Coordinates: 32°03′16″N 35°14′27″E

- Part of Maccabean Revolt
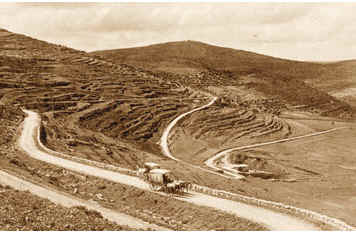
- Presumed location of the battle, 1912
Date	167 or 166 BCE
Location	Possibly near Lebonah (modern day Ma'ale Levona, West Bank); possibly near Wadi Haramiya
Result	Jewish victory

Belligerents
Judean rebels	Seleucid army

Commanders and leaders
Judas Maccabeus	Apollonius †

Strength
600 men	"A large force"

Casualties and losses
Unknown	"Many"

The Battle of the Ascent of Lebonah (Hebrew: קרב מעלה לבונה) or Battle with Apollonius (Hebrew: קרב אפולוניוס) was the first battle fought between the Maccabees and the Seleucid Empire in 167 or 166 BCE. The Jewish forces were led by Judas Maccabeus (Judah Maccabee) and the Seleucid army force was under the command of Apollonius, described by Josephus as "the strategos (general) of the Samaritan forces".

In the earliest stages of the Maccabean Revolt, Judas had a small band of guerrilla combat units in the hills of northern Judea and southern Samaria. Apollonius was sent with the local Samaritan armies to link up with Seleucid forces from Jerusalem. The exact location of the battle is not known, but presumably it was along a road between Samaria and Jerusalem. The date of the battle is not precisely known either, but occurred early in the revolt. It is the first battle discussed in the book of 1 Maccabees, hence generally being dated to 167–166 BCE.

The precise details of the battle are not known either, but 2 Maccabees writes that the rebels fought using guerrilla warfare in the early stage of the revolt, by "coming unexpectedly" on their foes and at night. It is reasonably possible that this battle was similar, with a surprise attack while the enemy was unaware. The larger Syrian Greek army was defeated, and Judas defeated Apollonius in personal combat. Another force was soon sent against Maccabees, which led to the Battle of Beth Horon.

== Primary sources ==
The battle's only contemporaneous record is in the First Book of Maccabees. According to it:

Apollonius now gathered together Gentiles and a large force from Samaria to fight against Israel. When Judas learned of it, he went out to meet him, and he defeated and killed him. Many were wounded and fell, and the rest fled. Then they seized their spoils; and Judas took the sword of Apollonius, and used it in battle for the rest of his life.

— 1 Maccabees 3:10-12 (NRSV)

2 Maccabees does not comment on the battle specifically, but describes in general terms the conduct of the early phase of the revolt: "Coming without warning, he [Judas] would set fire to towns and villages. He captured strategic positions and put to flight not a few of the enemy. He found the nights most advantageous for such attacks. And talk of his valor spread everywhere." It is possible that the original five-volume work written by Jason of Cyrene covered the battle, but was compressed into the above sentence by the epitomist who abridged 2 Maccabees.

The historian Josephus mentions the battle briefly in Jewish Antiquities Book 12, Chapter 7, but seems to largely paraphrase the 1 Maccabees version.

== Analysis ==
The book of 1 Maccabees, likely used as a source by Josephus, is very vague about the nature of the battle compared to the other battles in the revolt. The duel described may be more of a scriptural reference than a historical one. It falls back to Biblical phrases taken from the battle of David and Goliath; 1 Maccabees uses many phrases exactly as in 1 Samuel 17:50–54 to describe the duel and its results. This fits in with the agenda of the author of 1 Maccabees to present the Hasmoneans as heirs to the legacy of heroes of the Hebrew Bible and against Jews in the early Hasmonean kingdom who saw the Hasmoneans as usurpers, such as the Essenes. Historian Bezalel Bar-Kochva considers it unlikely that the author of the book was an eyewitness or was able to interview someone who was, unlike the later battles which are described in greater detail. He also warns that the claims of the Seleucid force being a "large army" should be taken with skepticism, as soldiers routinely overestimate the size of opposing armies, and claiming to have defeated more enemies would naturally make for a more impressive and inspiring story to rally the cause.

The precise date of the battle is not known. Mattathias's death is recorded as happening in the 146th year of the Seleucid era (SE) of the count used in Babylon & Judea, the equivalent to between Spring 166 BC to Spring 165 BC of the Gregorian calendar, so if the battle happened after Mattathias's death, then 166 BCE is a likely date. If Judas had taken up leadership of the rebels earlier, then a date such as 167 BCE becomes more plausible.

The location of the battle is not known, although it was presumably on the road between Samaria and Jerusalem. Michael Avi-Yonah proposed that an ascent near Lebonah (modern Al-Lubban ash-Sharqiya and Ma'ale Levona) was the most likely spot, halfway between Shechem (modern Nablus) and Jerusalem. The ascent there is steep and winding, with multiple places difficult to scout and thus useful for a raiding force to hide and prepare for an ambush from. Another proposal is somewhat further south at Wadi Haramiya, just north of Silwad; the road there is overlooked by ridges on both sides. That said, 1 Maccabees says that the army was deployed to "fight against Israel", a vague phrase that presumably only refers to their Greek allegiance. However, if this is taken as the purpose of the expedition being to actively hunt rebels in the Gophna Hills rather than head directly to Jerusalem, the battle could have taken place in many more locations, since the Seleucids would have left the road to fight the rebels on their home turf then. In this theory, there would be no point to marching to Jerusalem, already controlled by Menelaus and Hellenized Jews. Rather, Menelaus would have been calling for support to stop Judas's campaign of terrorism in the countryside of Hellenized Jews; Apollonius's campaign was to stop Judas's group at the source in the hillside, while Judas merely was seeking to survive rather than seeking a fight with the army directly.

Hostilities between Samaritans and Jews were long-standing, so Apollonius being able to recruit a presumably largely Samaritan army is not surprising. According to Josephus, the Samaritans were exempted from the anti-Jewish decree after they petitioned Antiochus IV, so the harsh measures seem to have been confined to Judea. Jews looked down on Samaritans as not true Jews, considering them corrupted by idolatry and intermarriage after the Assyrians conquered the region around 721 BCE. The Samaritans were thus more likely to be happier with the government.
