= Battle of Emmaus =

165 BC battle of the Maccabean Revolt

Coordinates: 31°50′21″N 34°59′22″E

- Part of the Maccabean Revolt
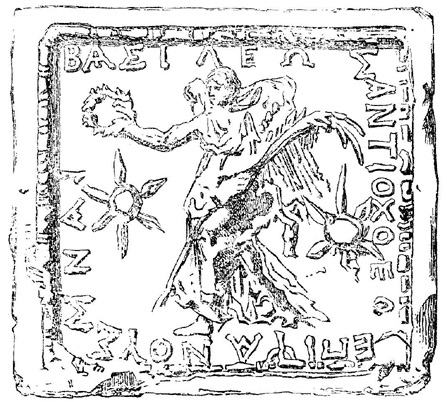
- Mina of Antiochus IV.
Date	September 165 BC
Location	Emmaus
Result	Judean rebel victory

Belligerents
Maccabees	Seleucid Empire

Commanders and leaders
Judas Maccabeus	Gorgias, Nicanor, and Ptolemy son of Dorymenes

Strength
3,000	10-15k

Casualties and losses
Unknown	unknown #Analysis)

The Battle of Emmaus took place around September 165 BC during the Maccabean Revolt between Judean rebels, led by Judas Maccabeus (Judah Maccabee), and an expedition of Seleucid Empire forces under generals Gorgias, Ptolemy the son of Dorymenes, and Nicanor near Emmaus. The battle was won by the Maccabee rebels, who marched by night and surprised the Seleucid camp while many soldiers were absent. The victorious Maccabees looted the Greek camp for valuables and likely weapons to help further their cause.

== Primary sources ==
The Battle of Emmaus is recorded in the books of 1 Maccabees (1 Maccabees 3:38–4:25), 2 Maccabees (2 Maccabees 8:8–8:36), and Josephus's Antiquities of the Jews Book 12. In general, the account in 1 Maccabees gives a more detailed description of the battle and the rebel army, and the author was possibly even a personal eyewitness to the battle. The description in 2 Maccabees gives a more accurate depiction of the Seleucid forces and commanders, but its depiction of the battle is more focused on moral lessons and emphasizing the righteousness of Judas and the Maccabee cause.

== Background ==
Toward the end of the summer of 165 BC, King Antiochus IV Epiphanes gathered forces from the Western part of his empire to leave for an expedition to the eastern satrapies in Babylonia and Persia. There, he intended to stay awhile, replace or do battle with rebellious governors, deter the growing Parthian Empire from invading, and restore a flow of taxes to the capital. He left Lysias in charge as regent in the Seleucid capital Antioch and to raise his young son, the future Antiochus V.

At the time, Jerusalem was still ruled by Seleucid-friendly Hellenist Jews and High Priest Menelaus. Perhaps at the request of Menelaus, Lysias dispatched a force, led by Ptolemy son of Dorymenes (strategos of Coele Syria and Phoenicia), in order to aid the ruling faction of Hellenist Jews and defeat the countryside rebels led by Judas. Ptolemy was accompanied by Gorgias and Nicanor as commanders. 2 Maccabees also suggests that Nicanor, one of the Seleucid generals, intended to raise money by using the army to enslave Jews, then sell them and pay off a 2,000 talent debt the Seleucids owed to the Roman Republic.

== Battle ==
Troop movements during the Battle of Emmaus. Blue arrows shows a hypothesized line of the Maccabees march from Mizpah to the west, red arrows shows proposed movement of Gorgias's raiding force; dotted red lines are the direction of the Seleucid camp's retreat.

The Seleucids established their base camp at the town of Emmaus. Emmaus is at the eastern edge of the Ayalon Valley and along the western border of Judea; it is a spot with easy access to numerous routes into the Judean hills and good water, making it an excellent base to project power from. Emmaus itself was largely flat, allowing use of cavalry and denying any rebel advantages from hilly terrain. Judas Maccabeus's camp was located in the town of Mizpah, north of Jerusalem. Gorgias planned to attack Judas's concentration of troops after receiving word of them; Judas possibly intentionally ensured that word of his location would leak by performing obvious ceremonies and rituals. Judas's scouts and spies found out that Gorgias was leading troops on a march against his camp and was planning to surprise the Jewish rebels in a night-time attack. Judas also possibly intentionally trimmed his army during a morale-raising religious ceremony at Mizpah. Using criteria from the Book of Deuteronomy, he ordered some of his troops to decamp: if they were betrothed, for example. Some scholars believe this claim is ahistorical and added to buttress the righteousness of the cause; others think the passage is historical, and suspect Judas intentionally favored the speed of a small force, and used the Biblical criteria on who to exclude as a way to build morale. 2 Maccabees writes that the Jewish force numbered 6,000 total, and 1 Maccabees indicates 3,000 soldiers actually proceeded with the attack.

Judas abandoned the camp at Mizpah and led his forces to Emmaus, to attack the expedition base camp that remained there. The timing on such a maneuver would have been strict: the Maccabees would have required excellent, speedy intelligence such as signal fires or riders and to have left just at nightfall for such a tactic to work, and to have chosen a different road than Gorgias took. Gorgias found the camp at Mizpah empty and deserted, and believing the rebel army had fled, began a search for them in the surrounding area.

The rebel troops, which had in truth advanced forward, came upon the unprepared Seleucid camp at Emmaus at dawn. Judas's troops numbered about 3,000 who had gone with him on the night march, and consisted of light infantry armed with swords and shields, perhaps fighting similar to peltasts of the era. The Seleucids had fortified their camp, possibly with a palisade, and had mounted scouts to offer at least some warning of an attack. However, many soldiers were absent with Gorgias, and others still asleep or unready. Blowing trumpets for intimidation and morale, the Jewish rebels attacked and forced the surprised camp to retreat to the southwest, toward Idumea.

Gorgias returned to Emmaus, only to find his camp destroyed. The Maccabees lit fires, possibly to disguise their number and discourage Gorgias's force from joining the fight. Gorgias did not give battle after the destruction of his base, but left for the coastal plains. The Maccabees looted the camp, taking gold and silver. While not directly recorded in the primary sources, they also presumably took abandoned Seleucid weapons: the rebels would have wanted better equipment, and the rebels are reported as indeed having better equipment in later battles of the revolt.

The outcome of the battle was quite influential. The two earlier clashes recorded against Apollonius and Seron appear to have been against small detachments. With this victory, the Maccabees proved that they could challenge larger numbers of Seleucid troops, and could make complicated plans and tactical ploys. Many rebellions existed during this time period, but most were quickly put out; the staying power of the Maccabees helped set up the eventual independence of the Hasmonean kingdom.

== Analysis ==
1 Maccabees is generally considered trustworthy in its depiction of the battle itself. Scholars have quibbled with other aspects of its portrayal of the battle, however. As in most battles of the Maccabean Revolt, the rebels and authors of 1 and 2 Maccabees are generally considered to have written exaggerated estimates of the size of the Seleucid forces. Defeating larger armies made for more impressive morale-raising stories. The book of 1 Maccabees claims that Gorgias's force that split from the camp consisted of 5,000 soldiers, 1,000 cavalrymen, and allied Hellenist Jews from the Acra as guides in his expedition to attack Judas, yet this would be unwieldy for a surprise attack that would travel through the narrow Beth Horon ascent, and the Seleucids had perhaps only 5,000 cavalry in the entire Western half of their empire. Some later manuscripts of 1 Maccabees adds that the rebel troops lacked "helmets and slings and stones and armor" as well in the battle; this is considered likely to be a gloss of an unknown scribe copying the material, and unlikely to be historical. Reported Seleucid casualty numbers are also considered implausibly high: 3,000 defeated according to 1 Maccabees, and 9,000 according to 2 Maccabees.

Judas's speeches and prayers in the book of 1 Maccabees are best seen as free compositions of the historian, not actual transcriptions, in the style of Hellenistic historians to essentially invent or rewrite such dialogue to be more literary. At the Battle of Emmaus, Judas's speech does not make sense in context: 1 Maccabees has him give the speech just before the rebels attack the base camp. Yet during a surprise attack, time is of the essence; every minute of delay after being spotted gives the defenders more time to rouse themselves, put on armor, and man the palisade. If Judas offered any speeches or special instructions, they would have happened during the ceremony held at Mizpah, a day earlier.
