= Nicanor (Seleucid general) =

Greek Seleucid general

Nicanor (/naɪˈkeɪnər/; Ancient Greek: Νικάνωρ, romanized: Nīkā́nōr; died 161 BCE) was a Syrian-Greek general (strategos) who served the Seleucid Empire during the reigns of kings Antiochus IV Epiphanes and Demetrius I Soter. He served during the Maccabean Revolt in Judea, then part of the Seleucid Empire, and served for a time as governor in Jerusalem. Relations between the government and the Jewish rebels eventually turned sufficiently hostile that he threatened the priests at the Second Temple and led an army to find and defeat Judas Maccabeus's followers, but he and his army were defeated at the Battle of Adasa. Nicanor was killed, his corpse was desecrated, his head and right hand hung for public display back in Jerusalem, and a new festival was declared to celebrate his defeat.

As Seleucid literature was ultimately not preserved, almost all of what is known of Nicanor comes from the Jewish books 1 Maccabees and 2 Maccabees. These books were preserved by becoming part of the Septuagint, a collection of Jewish writings in Greek that would serve to become the basis of the Christian Old Testament.

== During the reign of Antiochus Epiphanes ==
The book 2 Maccabees calls him "Nicanor son of Patroclus" and says he was one of the king's chief friends (philoi), at a time when the position would imply being an advisor as well as just friendship. Around 165 BCE, a military expedition was organized to defeat the rebels of the Maccabean Revolt. According to 1 Maccabees 3, the Seleucid army was led by three generals: Gorgias, Ptolemy son of Dorymenes, and Nicanor. However, the account in 1 Maccabees says nothing more specific of Nicanor's role, only describes Gorgias's actions in detail, and seems to imply Gorgias was in command. According to 2 Maccabees 8, Nicanor was appointed as leader of the expedition by the governor of Coele-Syria and Phoenicia named Ptolemy, although it is unclear if this governor was Ptolemy Macron or Ptolemy son of Dorymenes. 2 Maccabees does not describe any other commanders of the Seleucid force, although this may be more for literary reasons as the book is sketching out Nicanor's character arc for moral lessons, and thus the other commanders may have been considered off-topic. 2 Maccabees adds the detail that Nicanor plotted to raise money by using the army to enslave Jews and then sell them. This would be part of a scheme to pay off a 2,000 talent debt the Seleucids owed to the Roman Republic, presumably due to the terms of the Treaty of Apamea.

Regardless of the exact nature of the Seleucid command structure, the result of the expedition was the Battle of Emmaus around September 165 BCE, where the Maccabees won a surprising victory thanks to a daring night march and an early-morning assault on the Seleucid camp. The Seleucid army was forced to retreat, as was Nicanor.

== During the reign of Demetrius ==
Nicanor is recorded as being active during the early reign of King Demetrius. In either late 162 BCE or early 161 BCE, another Seleucid military expedition was sent to Judea, led by General Bacchides. 1 Maccabees does not record this expedition as being contested; the rebels were presumably rebuilding after their defeat at the Battle of Beth Zechariah. A new high priest, Alcimus was installed in Jerusalem. Bacchides returned to Antioch, but unrest led by Judas continued. Nicanor was sent to the province with a new military force and appointed as strategos (governor) of Judea. 2 Maccabees mentions a skirmish between forces led by Simon Thassi and Nicanor's troops at place called Dessau, but does not provide details beyond implying that the Seleucids won the battle, if inconclusively. As part of their role in Jerusalem, there appears to have been efforts to reach out and quiet the province, and bring moderate Hellenists back into loyalty with the Seleucid government. This included an attempt at negotiations with Judas Maccabeus, the leader of the revolt.

Here the accounts between 1 Maccabees and 2 Maccabees diverge somewhat. In the telling of 1 Maccabees, Nicanor is "one who hated Israel and was hostile to it" with orders to "wipe out the people", and is evil from the start. Judas was wary of the offer of negotiations and avoided some sort of trap Nicanor laid to capture him, and retreated to the countryside. Nicanor led a small group to fight a battle near Caphar-Salama, but Judas won, and the government troops retreated back to Jerusalem. In frustration, Nicanor went to the Second Temple and threatened the priests there to help him find Judas. He also made a blasphemous threat to burn the Temple down if Judas was not turned over.

In the telling of 2 Maccabees 14, Nicanor had previously been a commander of Seleucid war elephants before his governorship, perhaps loosely implying his participation at Beth Zechariah which saw war elephants used. However, relations are significantly more positive between Nicanor and Judas, with Judas being appointed some sort of government role as a deputy as part of peace negotiations, and the two becoming unlikely friends for a time. What disrupts this positive chance at peace is not the Greek Nicanor but rather a perfidious Jew in Alcimus, who complains to Demetrius that Nicanor has appointed Judas as his successor, and spreads wild accusations against Judas. Demetrius sends new orders to Nicanor to capture Judas and send him to Antioch. Judas realized that Nicanor was acting differently, and fled rather than be captured. 2 Maccabees agrees Nicanor threatened the priests at the Temple in a bid to find Judas, although adds the detail that he will erect a Temple to Dionysus after burning the Temple down.

After Nicanor takes the field, he and his Seleucid government-allied troops fight at Adasa. The result is the Battle of Adasa. It seems that Nicanor fell early in the battle, perhaps as a strategem of Judas's as Hellenistic-era commanders were often easy to identify. The rebels won the battle. Nicanor's corpse was desecrated and brought back to Jerusalem to be publicly displayed. In 1 Maccabees, it is Nicanor's head and right hand that are displayed. In 2 Maccabees, his head and arm are cut off, his tongue is cut out at the Temple as punishment for his blasphemy, and his head is hung from the walls.

== Nicanor Day ==
To celebrate the victory, a Jewish festival was declared on 13 Adar, Nicanor Day (יוֹם נִיקָנוֹר Yom Nicanor). The events of the victory are recounted in II Maccabees ch. 13-15, which prescribes that "And they all decreed by public vote never to let this day go unobserved but to have the thirteenth day of the twelfth month, which is called Adar in the Syrian language, marked, the day before Mordechai’s Day." In recent times, the commemoration of Nicanor Day has experienced an enthusiastic revival.

== Analysis ==
2 Maccabees makes Nicanor a major focus of moral lessons delivered by the author. While most of the depiction is unobjectionable, some scholars prefer 1 Maccabees where they differ, as they suspect that literary considerations may have overwhelmed historical ones. For example, 2 Maccabees only mentioning Nicanor at Emmaus probably does not mean that the other commanders were not involved such as Gorgias. The view that favors 1 Maccabees would argue that Nicanor's arc in 2 Maccabees was done for literary reasons to portray a downfall. On the other hand, others have defended the historicity of the 2 Maccabees account of friendlier relations between Judas and Nicanor; the Hasmonean-supporting author of 1 Maccabees may have not wished to have portrayed the Hasmoneans as having been "fooled" by the Seleucid authorities given the later breakdown in relations.

2 Maccabees 12:1-2 mentions a person called "Nicanor the Cypriarch" when listing some enemies of the Jews stirring up trouble. Daniel R. Schwartz suggests this is the author using different titles to distinguish different people of the same name, and that the Nicanor referred to in 12:1-2 was the commander of some Cypriot mercenaries described earlier in 2 Maccabees Chapter 5. Others have interpreted the reference to suggest that perhaps the "main" Nicanor described in the work may have served as governor of Cyprus in the past before his actions in Judea, or been otherwise associated with Cyprus, although Seleucid control of Cyprus was very brief.

The historian Josephus's work Jewish Antiquities describes Nicanor and the Battle of Adasa in Book 12, but does not add any detail on Nicanor not already in 1 Maccabees, which seems to have been Josephus's main source.

In later writings of Rabbinical Judaism, Nicanor's Day is mentioned in Megillat Taanit. Nicanor's Day is also discussed in the Ta'anit tractate of the Talmud, although its depiction of Nicanor is rather brief: it describes Nicanor making boastful oaths, being slain in battle, and his thumbs and toes being hung at the gates of Jerusalem.
