= Lebonah =

Ancient town in Samaria, mentioned in the Hebrew Bible

Lebonah was a town near Shiloh, on the north side of Bethel, mentioned in the Hebrew Bible (Judges 21:19). It has been identified with Al-Lubban ash-Sharqiya, to the south of Nablus.

The nearby Israeli community of Ma'ale Levona, located near this site, takes its name from Lebonah.

== Etymology ==
In Hebrew, lebonah means frankincense, and is used in this meaning in all other appearances in the Hebrew Bible.
