= Battle of Beth Horon (166 BC) =

Battle

- Part of Maccabean Revolt
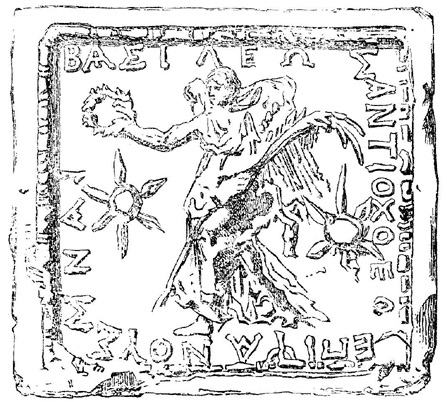
- Mina of Antiochus IV.
Date	166 BC or 165 BC
Location	Beth-horon, ascent of Beit Horon 31°52′38″N 35°7′7″E
Result	Jewish victory

Belligerents
Judean rebels	Seleucid army

Commanders and leaders
Judas Maccabeus	Seron

Strength
"A small company"	"A multitude"

Casualties and losses
Unknown	800

The Battle of Beth Horon or Battle with Seron was fought at some point between Spring 166 BC to Spring 165 BC during the Maccabean Revolt between Judean rebels led by Judas Maccabeus (Judah Maccabee) and an army of the Seleucid Empire under the command of Seron, a commander of the Syrian army. Beth-Horon, or Bethoron, was a strategic mountain pass leading from the coastal plain to the Judean hill country. Utilizing guerrilla warfare tactics, the Maccabee rebels ambushed the passing Seleucid force from the pass, pursuing the surprised and fleeing remnants into the plain.

The Jewish army had earlier won a battle at the ascent of Lebonah against the Seleucid General Apollonius. Another force was soon sent against the Maccabees, which led to the Battle of Emmaus.

== Primary sources ==
The battle's only contemporaneous record is in the First Book of Maccabees. According to it:

When Seron, the commander of the Syrian army, heard that Judas had gathered a large company, including a body of faithful soldiers who stayed with him and went out to battle, he said, 'I will make a name for myself and win honor in the kingdom. I will make war on Judas and his companions, who scorn the king's command.' Once again a strong army of godless men went up with him to help him, to take vengeance on the Israelites.

When he approached the ascent of Beth-horon, Judas went out to meet him with a small company. But when they saw the army coming to meet them, they said to Judas, 'How can we, few as we are, fight against so great and so strong a multitude? And we are faint, for we have eaten nothing today.' Judas replied, 'It is easy for many to be hemmed in by few, for in the sight of Heaven there is no difference between saving by many or by few. It is not on the size of the army that victory in battle depends, but strength comes from Heaven. They come against us in great insolence and lawlessness to destroy us and our wives and our children, and to despoil us; but we fight for our lives and our laws. He himself will crush them before us; as for you, do not be afraid of them.'

When he finished speaking, he rushed suddenly against Seron and his army, and they were crushed before him. They pursued them down the descent of Beth-horon to the plain; eight hundred of them fell, and the rest fled into the land of the Philistines. Then Judas and his brothers began to be feared, and terror fell on the Gentiles all around them. His fame reached the king, and the Gentiles talked of the battles of Judas.

— 1 Maccabees 3:13-26 (NRSV)

The historian Josephus mentions the battle briefly in Antiquities of the Jews, but seems to largely be a paraphrase of the 1 Maccabees version. Josephus's account differs in that adds is that he claims that Seron was killed outright, as well as referring to him as a general (strategos) rather than a commander. Historian Bezalel Bar-Kochva believes that Josephus misread 1 Maccabees on the matter of Seron's fate; 1 Maccabees says that Seron was "defeated" in the sense of his army losing the battle, but he speculated Josephus read it more literally as Seron being defeated as in "slain".

== Analysis ==
The Beth Horon pass in the era was exceptionally narrow; according to a baraita tale: "Two camels climbed Beth Horon Ascent and met each other. If both were going up together both would fall; if one after the other, they would both go up." Nevertheless, it was still part of the main road from Jerusalem to the west during the era, as other routes involved even greater difficulties. This makes it plausible as a spot for a small force to inflict major damage, as coordination among a surprised procession would be difficult, and superior numbers would count for little.

Judas's speeches and prayers in the book of 1 Maccabees are best seen as free compositions of the historian, not actual transcriptions, in the style of Hellenistic historians to essentially invent or rewrite such dialogue to be more literary. The speech described before this battle does not particularly fit the situation of preparing for an ambush. In the narrow terrain of the mountain ascent, the ambush would work better with only a small force anyway, with less risk of being spotted; it would be part of the plan rather than an ominous sign that indicated divine favor was needed to win the battle.

The book of 1 Maccabees occasionally uses archaic phrasings to present the deeds of the Hasmoneans as similar or equivalent to those of earlier heroes of Jewish Scripture. The defeated Seleucid force retreats to the "land of the Philistines", but the Philistines were no longer a polity in the Hellenistic era. Rather, it is a poetic reference to eparchy of Paralia on Judea's coastal plain to the west of Beth Horon, which in this era only had a Jewish minority and was friendly to the Greeks.

The precise date of the battle is not known, but is likely between 166–165 BC. Mattathias's death is recorded as happening in the 146th year of the Ancient Macedonian calendar of the count used in Babylon & Judea, the equivalent to between Spring 166 BC to Spring 165 BC of the Gregorian calendar, and the structure of the narrative implies that Mattathias was already dead by the time the battle with Seron was fought.

Bar-Kochva suspects that the author of 1 Maccabees was not an eyewitness to this battle, although was able to interview someone who was. He thinks that the description is basically accurate, although the author inflated the number of enemy soldiers as well as Seron's rank in the army to make the victory seem more impressive. For this early stage of the revolt, it is more plausible that the Maccabees ambushed a smaller detachment of soldiers rather than attacking a huge army. The claim that "terror" befell the Gentiles in their vicinity as a result of the victory against Seron seems somewhat overblown; later events in the text would show that they were not so afraid as to avoid antagonizing the Maccabees. The non-Jewish Idumeans, Samaritans, and Greek residents of coastal towns would go on to cause quite a bit of trouble for the Maccabees as the Maccabean Revolt proceeded, forcing Judas and his army to protect Jews in the outlying areas and escort them to Judea as refugees during the campaigns of 163 BC.

Nothing is known of Seron other than his name and that he commanded the army. The name "Seron" might possibly be of Thracian origin, but the presumed translation of 1 Maccabees from Hebrew to Greek may have distorted the word. The identity of the "godless" (Note: Koine Greek: ἀσεβῶν. The original Hebrew might have been "sinners" or "criminals" as other possibilities.) allies of Seron is not entirely clear either; possibilities include outlying Samaritans or Ammonites hostile to the Jews, Thracian mercenaries similar to Seron himself (if he really was Thracian), and Hellenized Jews who had been recruited as soldiers by the Seleucid government.
