= Gorgias (general) =

Gorgias (/ˈɡɔːrdʒiəs/ GOR-jee-əs) was a Syrian-Seleucid General of the 2nd century BC, in the service of Antiochus Epiphanes (1 Macc 3:38; 2 Macc 8:9).

== Life ==
After Judas Maccabeus's forces defeated the Seleucid army at the Battle of Beth Horon, they were determined to send a stronger force against him. According to 1 Maccabees iii. 38, which Josephus follows ("The Antiquities of the Jews" xii. 7, § 3), it was the governor Lysias, who had been left as regent during the absence of Antiochus in Persia, who commissioned the generals Nicanor and Gorgias, sending them with a large army to Judea.

== The Battle of Emmaus ==
The Syrians were so sure of victory that they took with them a number of merchants, to whom they intended to sell the Jewish prisoners as slaves. The Syrians camped at Emmaus; and Gorgias was sent thence with 5,000 infantry and 1,000 Cavalry to attack Judas by night (1 Macc 4:1-24), his guides being treacherous Jews. Judas had been informed of the expedition, and attacked the main Syrian army at Emmaus, completely routing it. Gorgias, not finding the enemy in camp, concluded they had retired into the mountains, and went in pursuit of them. Judas sagaciously kept his men from touching the booty, preparing them for the impending battle with Gorgias. When the latter returned to the main camp, he found it in flames, and the Jews ready for battle. The Syrians, seized with panic, fled into the Philistine territory, and only then did the Jews seize the rich spoils (166 BC). The victory was all the more striking as the force of Judas was considerably smaller in number and had "not armor nor swords to their minds" (1 Macc 4:6).

Gorgias did not again dare to enter Judea. Once when Judas and Simon Maccabeus were carrying the war outside of that country, two subordinate generals, Joseph and Azariah, in violation of orders undertook an expedition against Jamnia, but were severely beaten by Gorgias (1 Maccabees v. 18, 19, 55–62), who is designated in "Ant." xii. 8, § 6, "general of the forces of Jamnia." 1 Maccabees does not mention this expedition, but refers to another, and calls Gorgias "governor of Idumaea" (xii. 32), which seems to be more correct than "of Jamnia." He set out with 3,000 infantry and 400 cavalry, and killed a number of Jews; whereupon a certain Dositheus of Tobiene (so the correct reading of the Syrian translation), one of those whom Judas had protected against the pagans, threw himself upon Gorgias and seized his mantle, intending to take him prisoner; but a Thracian horseman cut off Dositheus' arm and so saved Gorgias. The last-named then retired to Marissa (ib. verse 35; comp. "Ant." xii. 8, § 6), after which he is lost to view. Willrich assumes ("Judaica," p. 33) from the description of the booty in 1 Maccabees iv. 23 that Holofernes in the Book of Judith represents Gorgias.

Later on 164 BC he held a garrison in Jamnia, and gained a victory over the forces of Joseph and Azarias who, envying the glory of Judas and Jonathan, in direct disobedience of the orders of Judas, attacked Gorgias and were defeated. Jamnia as given in Josephus, Ant, XII, viii, 6, is probably the correct reading for Idumaea in 2 Macc 12:32. The actions of Gorgias in 2 Macc are recorded with some confusion. He was regarded with special hostility by the Jews. In 2 Macc 12:35 he is described as "the accursed man."

== Sources ==
- Hutchinson, J. (1915). "Gorgias". In Orr, James, M.A., D.D. (ed.). International Standard Bible Encyclopedia. Wm. B. Eerdmans.
- Heinrich Graetz, Geschichte ii. 343, 357;
- Emil Schürer, Geschichte 3d ed., i. 205, 212;
- Benediktus Niese, in Hermes, xxxv. 466.G. S. Kr.
- Bechtel, Florentine Stanislaus (1910). "The Machabees" . In Herbermann, Charles (ed.). Catholic Encyclopedia. Vol. 9. New York: Robert Appleton Company.
- Singer, Isidore; et al., eds. (1901–1906). "Gorgias". The Jewish Encyclopedia. New York: Funk & Wagnalls.
