= Judas Maccabeus =

Jewish priest who led the Maccabean Revolt

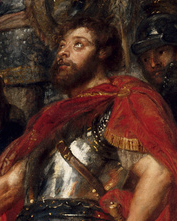
- Detail from The Triumph of Judas Maccabeus by Peter Paul Rubens, 1634–36

Leader of the Maccabees
- Tenure: 166–160 BCE
- Predecessor: Mattathias
- Successor: Jonathan Apphus
- Died: April 160 BCE; Elasa, Seleucid Empire
- Burial: Modi'in
- Dynasty: Hasmonean
- Father: Mattathias

Judas Maccabaeus (/ˌmækəˈbiːəs/), also known as Judah Maccabee (Hebrew: יהודה המכבי, romanized: Yehudah HaMakabi), (Note: The modern Hebrew spelling for the name follows a reconstruction based on the Ancient Greek name Makkabaîos (Μακκαβαῖος), the double kk being rendered as the Hebrew character kaph (כ), while overlooking the more ancient spelling of this name found in the Aramaic Scroll of Antiochus, and where the name is rendered as מַקבֵּי, with a qoph (ק).) was a Jewish priest (kohen) and a son of the priest Mattathias. He was an early leader in the Maccabean Revolt against the Seleucid Empire, taking over from his father around 166 BCE, and leading the revolt until his death in 160 BCE.

The Jewish holiday of Hanukkah ('Dedication') commemorates the restoration of Jewish worship at the Second Temple in Jerusalem in 164 BCE after Judah Maccabee removed all of the statues depicting Greek gods and goddesses and purified it.

== Life ==
=== Early life ===
Judah was the third son of Mattathias, the Hasmonean, a Jewish priest from the village of Modi'in. In 167 BCE, Mattathias, together with his sons Judah, Eleazar, Simon, John, and Jonathan, started a revolt against the Seleucid ruler Antiochus IV Epiphanes, who since 169/8 BC had issued decrees that forbade Jewish religious practices. After Mattathias died in 166 BC, Judah assumed leadership of the revolt per the deathbed disposition of his father. The First Book of Maccabees praises Judah's valor and military talent, suggesting that those qualities made Judah a natural choice for the new commander.

=== Origin of the name "The Hammer" ===
In the early days of the rebellion, Judah received the surname Maccabee. It is not known whether this name should be understood in Greek, Hebrew, or Aramaic. Several explanations have been put forward for this name. One suggestion is that the name derives from the Aramaic maqqaba ("makebet" in modern Hebrew), "hammer" or "sledgehammer" (cf. the cognomen of Charles Martel, the 8th century Frankish leader), in recognition of his ferocity in battle.

According to Jewish folklore, the name Maccabee is an acronym of the verse Mi kamokha ba'elim Adonai (YHWH), "Who is like you, O God, among the gods that are worshiped?", the Maccabean battle-cry to motivate troops (Exodus 15:11) as well as a part of daily Jewish prayers (see Mi Chamocha). Some scholars maintain that the name is a shortened form of the Hebrew maqqab-Yahu (from naqab, "to mark, to designate"), meaning "the one designated by God." Although contextualized as a modern-day "surname" (Jews didn't start having surnames until the Middle Ages) exclusive to Judah, Maccabee came to signify all the Hasmoneans who fought during the Maccabean revolt.

=== Early victories ===
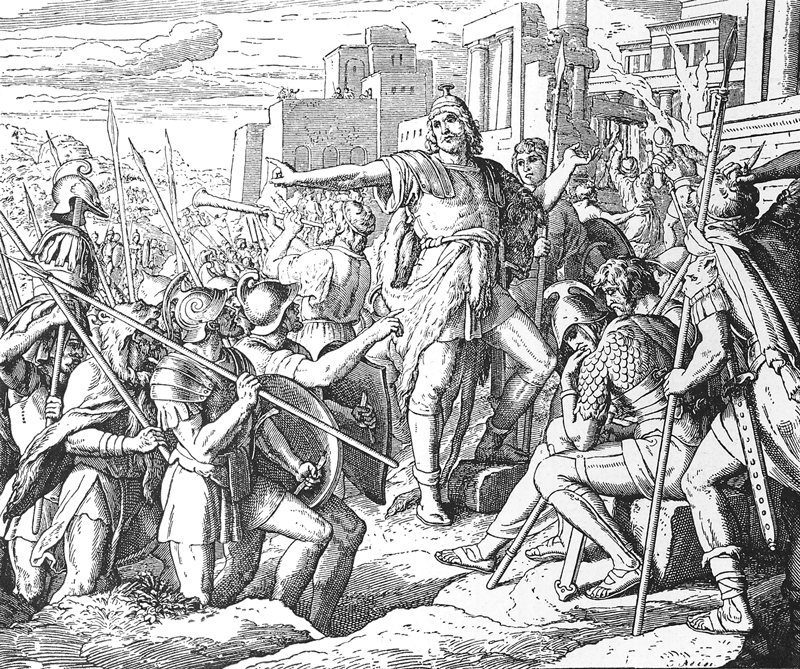
Judah from Die Bibel in Bildern

Mindful of the superiority of Seleucid forces during the first two years of the revolt, Judah's strategy was to avoid any engagement with their regular army and resort to guerrilla warfare to give them a feeling of insecurity. The strategy enabled Judah to win a string of victories. At the battle of Nahal el-Haramiah (wadi haramia), he defeated a small Seleucid force under the command of Apollonius, governor of Samaria, who was killed. Judah took possession of Apollonius's sword and used it until his death as a symbol of vengeance. After Nahal el-Haramiah, recruits flocked to the Jewish cause.

Shortly after that, Judah routed a larger Seleucid army under the command of Seron near Beth-Horon, largely thanks to a good choice of battlefield. Then, in the Battle of Emmaus, Judah proceeded to defeat the Seleucid forces led by generals Nicanor and Gorgias. This force was dispatched by Lysias, whom Antiochus left as viceroy after departing on a campaign against the Parthians. By a forced night march, Judah succeeded in eluding Gorgias, who had intended to attack and destroy the Jewish forces in their camp with his cavalry. While Gorgias was searching for him in the mountains, Judah attacked the Seleucid camp, taking the Seleucids by surprise, and defeated them at the Battle of Emmaus. The Seleucid commander had no alternative but to withdraw to the coast.

The defeat at Emmaus convinced Lysias that he must prepare for a serious and prolonged war. He accordingly assembled a new and larger army and marched with it on Judea from the south via Idumea. After several years of conflict, Judah drove out his foes from Jerusalem, except for the garrison in the citadel of Acra. He purified the defiled Temple of Jerusalem and, on the 25th of Kislev (December 14, 164 BCE), restored the service in the Temple. The reconsecration of the Temple became a permanent Jewish holiday, Hanukkah, which continued even after the Temple was destroyed in 70 CE. Hanukkah is still celebrated annually. The liberation of Jerusalem was the first step on the road to ultimate independence.

=== After Jerusalem ===
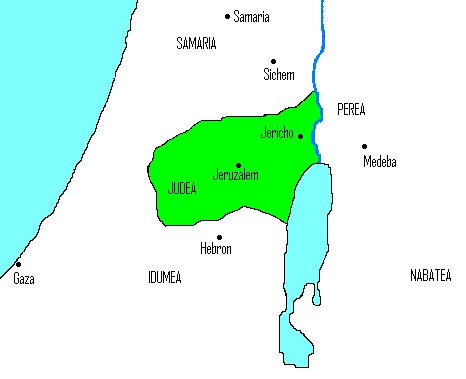
Judea under Judah Maccabee

Upon hearing the news that the Jewish communities in Gilead, Transjordan, and Galilee were under attack by neighboring Greek cities, Judah immediately went to their aid. Judah sent his brother, Simeon, to Galilee at the head of 3,000 men; Simeon was successful, achieving numerous victories. He transplanted a substantial portion of the Jewish settlements, including women and children, to Judea. Judah led the campaign in Transjordan, taking his brother Jonathan with him. After fierce fighting, he defeated the Transjordanian tribes and rescued the Jews concentrated in fortified towns in Gilead. The Jewish population of the areas taken by the Maccabees was evacuated to Judea. After the fighting in Transjordan, Judah turned against the Edomites in the south, captured and destroyed Hebron and Maresha. He then marched on the coast of the Mediterranean, destroyed the altars and statues of the pagan gods in Azotus, and returned to Judea with many spoils.

Judah then laid siege to the Seleucid garrison at the Acra, the Seleucid citadel of Jerusalem. The besieged, who included not only Syrian-Greek troops but also Hellenistic Jews, appealed for help to Lysias, who effectively became the regent of the young king Antiochus V Eupator after the death of Antiochus Epiphanes at the end of 164 BC during the Parthian campaign. Lysias and Eupator set out for a new campaign in Judea. Lysias skirted Judea as he had done in his first campaign, entering it from the south and besieging Beth-Zur. Judah raised the siege of the Acra and went to meet Lysias. In the Battle of Beth-zechariah, south of Bethlehem, the Seleucids achieved their first major victory over the Maccabees, and Judah was forced to withdraw to Jerusalem. Beth-Zur was compelled to surrender, and Lysias reached Jerusalem and laid siege on the city. The defenders found themselves in a precarious situation because their provisions were exhausted; it was a sabbatical year during which the fields were left uncultivated. However, just as capitulation seemed imminent, Lysias and Eupator had to withdraw when Antiochus Epiphanes's commander-in-chief Philip, whom the late ruler appointed regent before his death, rebelled against Lysias and was about to enter Antioch and seize power. Lysias proposed a peaceful settlement, which was concluded at the end of 163 BC. The peace terms were based on the restoration of religious freedom, the permission for the Jews to live per their own laws, and the official return of the Temple to the Jews. Lysias defeated Philip, only to be overthrown by Demetrius, son of the late Seleucus IV Philopator, who returned from years as a hostage in Rome. Demetrius appointed Alcimus (Jakim), a Hellenistic Jew, as high priest, a choice the Hasidim (Pietists) might have accepted since he was of priestly descent.

=== Internal conflict ===
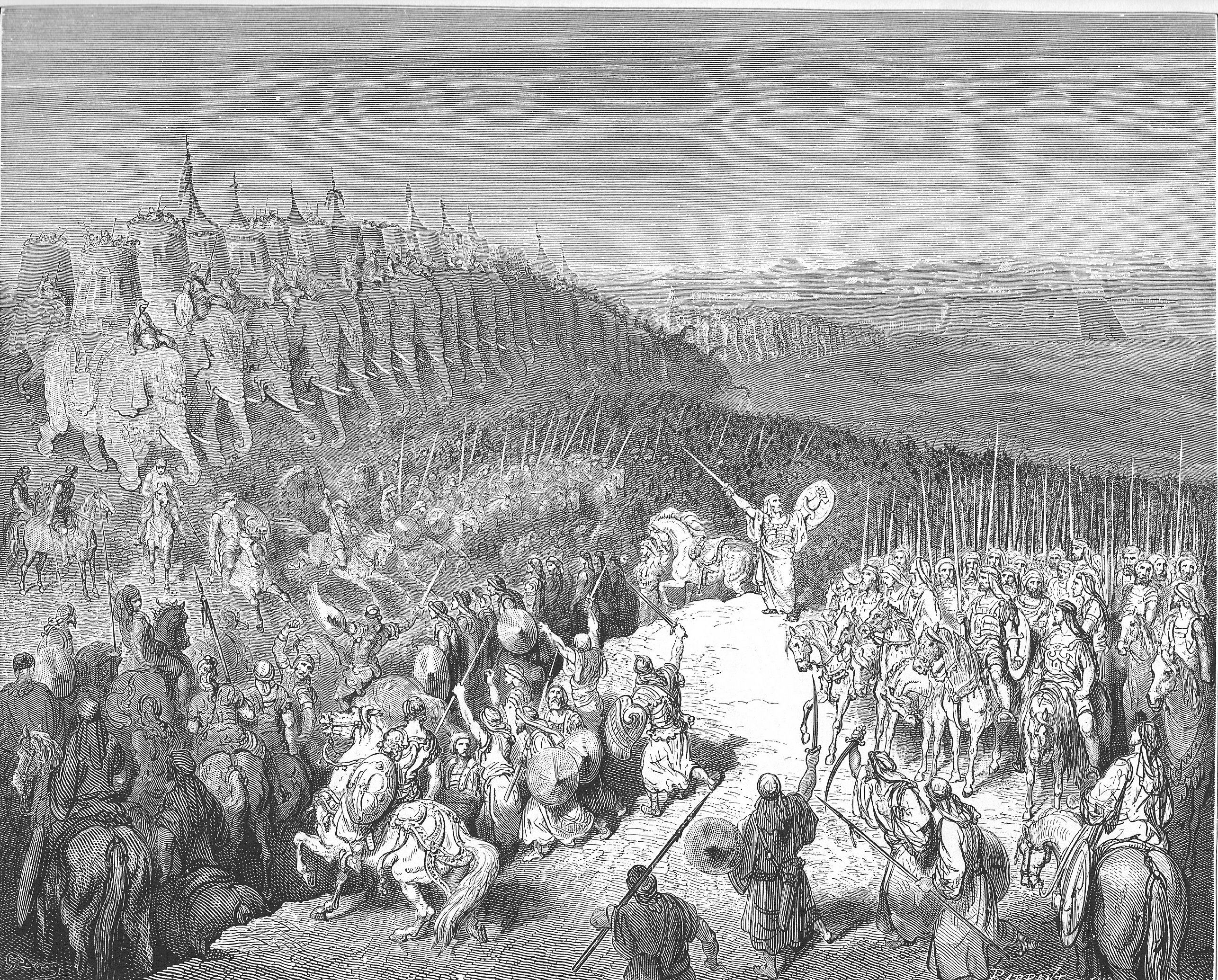
Judas Maccabeus before the army of Nicanor, by Gustave Doré

When war against the external enemy ended, an internal struggle broke out between the party led by Judah and the Hellenist party. The influence of the Hellenizers all but collapsed in the wake of the Seleucid defeat. The Hellenizing High Priest Menelaus was removed from office and executed. His successor was another Hellenizer Alcimus. When Alcimus executed sixty priests who were opposed to him, he found himself in open conflict with the Maccabees. Alcimus fled from Jerusalem and went to the Seleucid king, asking for help.

Meanwhile, Demetrius I Soter, son of Seleucus IV Philopator and nephew of the late Antiochus IV Epiphanes, fled from Rome in defiance of the Roman Senate and arrived in Syria. Declaring himself the rightful king, he captured and killed Lysias and Antiochus Eupator, taking the throne. It was thus Demetrius to whom the delegation, led by Alcimus, complained of the persecution of the Hellenist party in Judea. Demetrius granted Alcimus's request to be appointed High Priest under the protection of the king's army and sent to Judea an army led by Bacchides. The weaker Jewish army could not oppose the enemy and withdrew from Jerusalem, so Judah returned to wage guerrilla warfare. Soon after, the Seleucid Army needed to return to Antioch because of the turbulent political situation. Judah's forces returned to Jerusalem, and the Seleucids dispatched another army led by Nicanor. In a battle near Adasa, on the 13th Adar 161 BC, the Seleucid army was destroyed, and Nicanor was killed. The annual "Day of Nicanor" was instituted to commemorate this victory.

=== Agreement with Rome and death ===
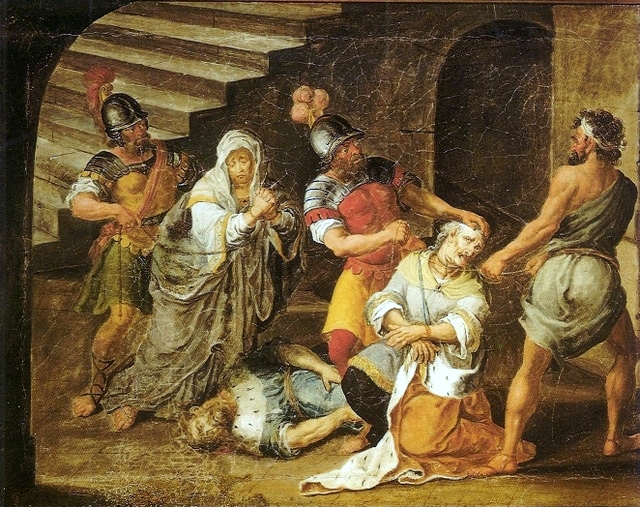
Death of Judas Maccabeus by José Teófilo de Jesus

The Roman–Jewish Treaty was an agreement made between Judah Maccabee and the Roman Republic in 161 BC according to 1 Maccabees 8:17–20 and Josephus. It was the first recorded contract between the Jewish people and the Romans.

The agreement with Rome failed to affect Demetrius' policy. On receiving the news of Nicanor's defeat, he dispatched a new army, again commanded by Bacchides. This time, the Seleucid forces of 20,000 men were numerically so superior that most of Judah's men left the battlefield and advised their leader to do likewise and await a more favorable opportunity. However, Judah decided to stand his ground.

In the Battle of Elasa, Judah and those who remained faithful to him were killed. His body was taken by his brothers from the battlefield and buried in the family sepulcher at Modiin. The death of Judah Maccabee (d. 160 BCE) stirred the Jews to renewed resistance. After several additional years of war under the leadership of two of Mattathias' other sons, Jonathan and Simon, the Jews finally achieved independence and the liberty to worship freely.

== In the arts ==
=== Pre-19th century ===
As a warrior hero and national liberator, Judah Maccabee has inspired many writers, and several artists and composers. In the Divine Comedy, Dante sees his spirit in the Heaven of Mars with the other "heroes of the true faith". In Shakespeare's Love's Labour's Lost, he is enacted along with the other Nine Worthies, but heckled for sharing a name with Judas Iscariot. Most significant works dedicated solely to him date from the 17th century onwards. William Houghton's Judas Maccabaeus, performed in about 1601 but now lost, is thought to have been the first drama on the theme; however, Judas Macabeo, an early comedia by crucial Spanish playwright Pedro Calderón de la Barca, is extant. Fernando Rodríguez-Gallego details its history in his critical edition: the play was performed in the 1620s in different versions and finally published as part of an anthology by Vera Tassis in 1637. Following on its heels is El Macabeo (Naples, 1638), a Castilian epic by the Portuguese Marrano Miguel de Silveyra. Two other 17th-century works are La chevalerie de Judas Macabé, by French poet Pierre Du Ries, and the anonymous Neo-Latin work Judas Machabaeus (Rome, 1695). Handel wrote his Judas Maccabaeus oratorio (1746) on the subject.

=== 19th century ===
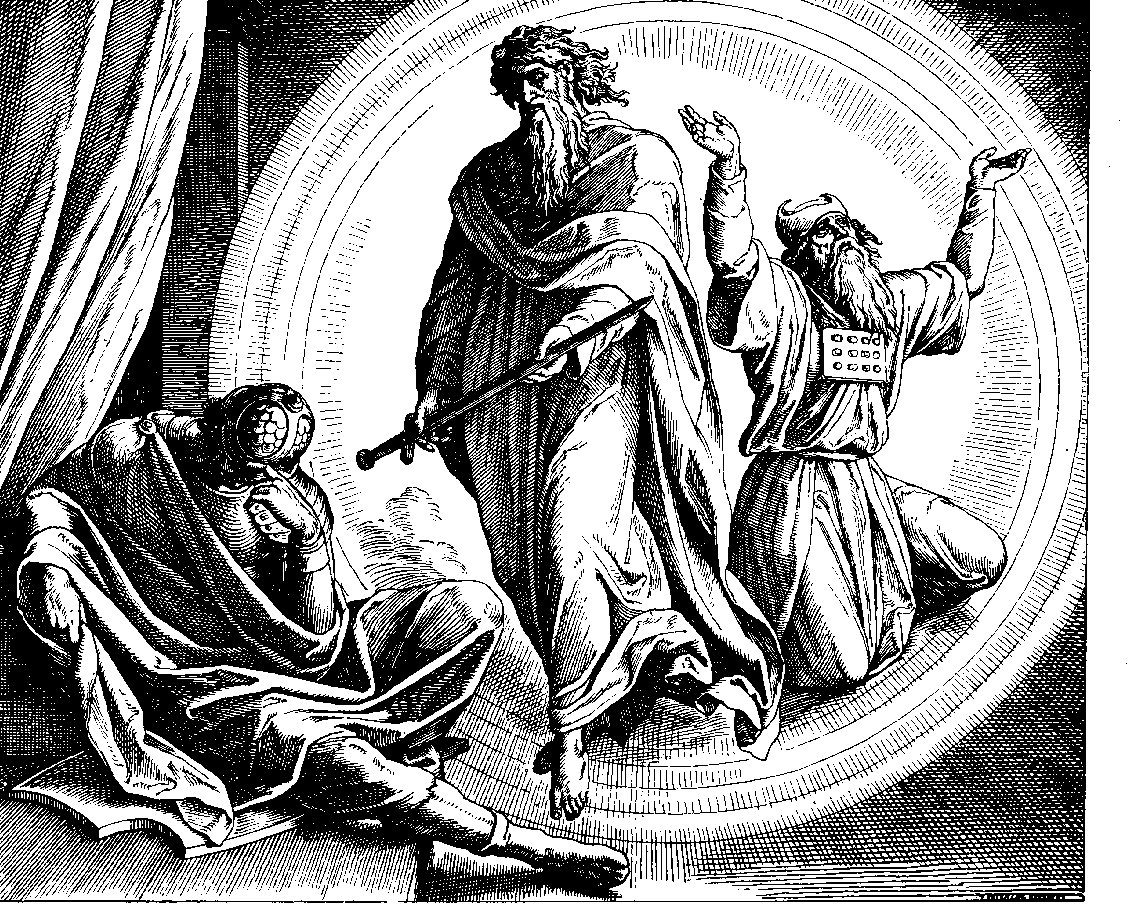
Vision of Judas Maccabee, 1860 woodcut by Julius Schnorr von Karolsfeld

There has been interest in Judah in every century. Giuda Macabeo, ossia la morte di Nicanore... (1839) is an Italian "azione sacra" based on which Vallicella composed an oratorio. One of the best-known literary works on the theme is Judas Maccabaeus (1872), a five-act verse tragedy by Henry Wadsworth Longfellow. A Hebrew version of Longfellow's play was published in 1900. Two later 19th-century interpretations of the story are Judas Makkabaeus, a novella by the German writer Josef Eduard Konrad Bischoff, which appeared in Der Gefangene von Kuestrin (1885), and The Hammer (1890), a book by Alfred J. Church and Richmond Seeley.

=== 20th century ===
Several 20th-century Jewish authors have also written works devoted to Judah Maccabee and the Maccabean Revolt. Jacob Benjamin Katznelson (1855–1930) wrote the poem, "Alilot Gibbor ha-Yehudim Yehudah ha-Makkabi le-Veit ha-Hashmona'im" (1922); the Yiddish writer Moses Schulstein wrote the dramatic poem, "Yehudah ha-Makkabi" (in A Layter tsu der Zun, 1954); Jacob Fichman's "Yehudah ha-Makkabi" is one of the heroic tales included in Sippurim le-Mofet (1954). Amit Arad's historical novel "Lions of Judea – The miraculous story of the Maccabees" (2014). Many children's plays have also been written on the theme by various Jewish authors.

In addition, the American writer Howard Fast penned the historical novel My Glorious Brothers, published in 1948 during the 1947–1949 Palestine war.

During World War II the Swiss-German writer Karl Boxler published his novel Judas Makkabaeus; ein Kleinvolk kaempft um Glaube und Heimat (1943), the subtitle of which suggests that Swiss democrats then drew a parallel between their own national hero, William Tell, and the leader of the Maccabean revolt against foreign tyranny.

The modern play Playing Dreidel with Judah Maccabee by Edward Einhorn is about a contemporary boy who meets the historical figure.

=== Visual arts ===
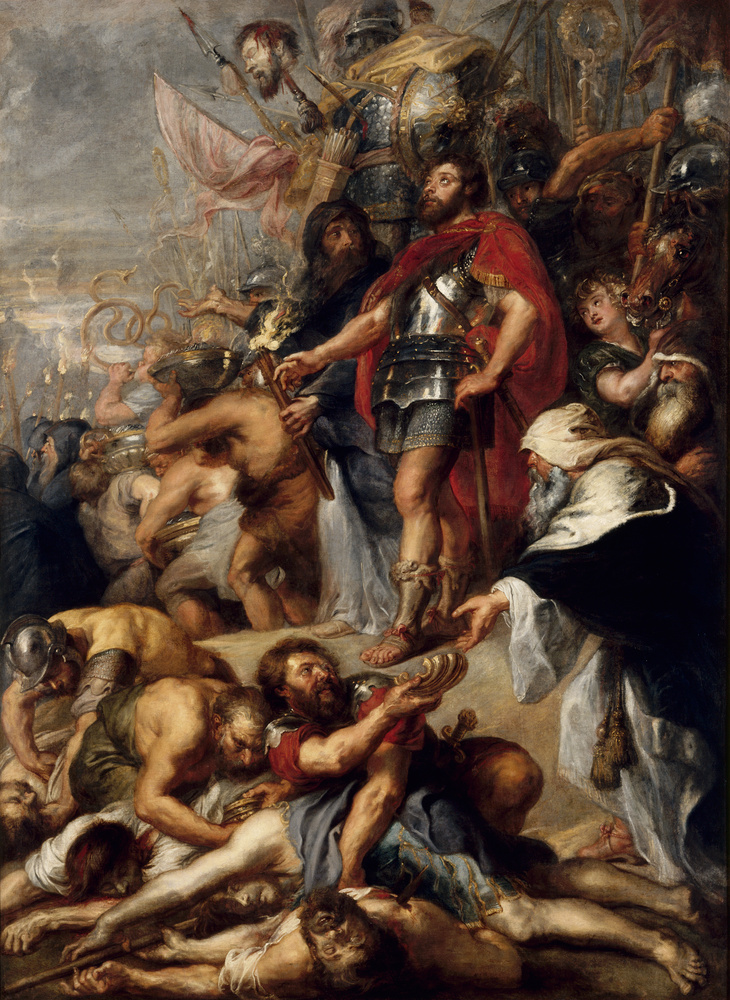
The Triumph of Judas Maccabeus, Rubens

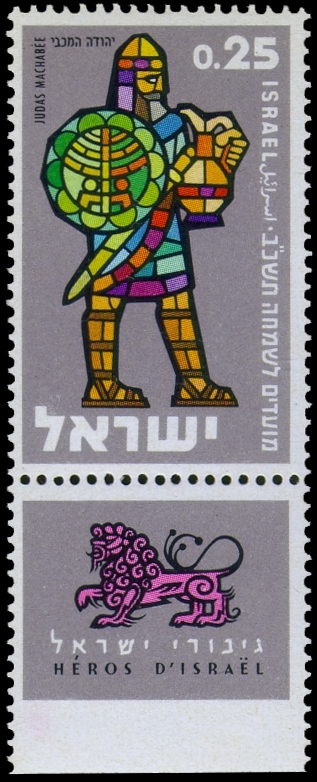
Stamp of Israel dedicated to Judas Maccabeus, 1961

In the medieval Christian art, Judah Maccabee was regarded as one of the heroes of the Old Testament. He figures in a tenth-century illustrated manuscript Libri Maccabaeorum. The late medieval French artist Jean Fouquet painted an illustration of Judah triumphing over his enemies for his famous manuscript of Josephus. Rubens painted Judah Maccabee praying for the dead; the painting illustrates an episode from 2 Maccabees 12:39–48 in which Judah's troops find stolen idolatrous charms on the corpses of Jewish warriors slain on the battlefield. He therefore offers prayers and an expiatory sacrifice for these warriors who have died in a state of sin. During the Counter-Reformation the passage was used by Catholics against Protestants in order to justify the doctrine of purgatory. Accordingly, Rubens painted the scene for the Chapel of the Dead in Tournai cathedral. In the 19th century, Paul Gustave Doré executed an engraving of Judah Maccabee victoriously pursuing the shattered troops of the Syrian enemy.

=== Music ===
In music, almost all the compositions inspired by the Hasmonean rebellion revolve around Judah. In 1746, the composer George Frideric Handel composed his oratorio Judas Maccabeus, putting the biblical story in the context of the Jacobite rising of 1745. This work, with libretto by Thomas Morell, had been written for the celebrations following the Duke of Cumberland's victory over the Scottish Jacobite rebels at the Battle of Culloden in 1746. The oratorio's most famous chorus is "See, the conqu'ring hero comes". The tune of this chorus was later adopted as a Christian Easter hymn tune Thine Be The Glory, Risen Conquering Son. A Hebrew translation of Handel's Judas Maccabee was prepared for the 1932 Maccabiah Games and is now popular in Israel with the motif of "conqu'ring hero" becoming a Hanukkah song. Beethoven composed a set of theme and variations 12 Variations on 'See the conqu'ring hero comes' for Cello and Piano, WoO 45.

Tom Lehrer refers to Judas Maccabeus in his song "Hanukkah in Santa Monica".

Mirah refers to Judah Maccabee in her song "Jerusalem".

In "The Goldbergs Mixtape", a parody song is named "Judah Macabee".

== See also ==
- Jewish leadership
- List of Hasmonean and Herodian rulers
- Nine Worthies

== Notes ==
Judas Maccabeus House of Asamoneus Born: 190 BCE Died: 160 BCE
Jewish titles
Preceded by Mattathias	Leader of the Maccabees; 166 BCE – 160 BCE	Succeeded by Jonathan Apphus
