= Bezalel Bar-Kochva =

Israeli historian

- בצלאל בר-כוכבא
- Born: January 1, 1941 (age 85); Tel Aviv, Mandatory Palestine
- Occupations: Historian, Professor Emeritus
- Awards: Humboldt Research Award Programme (2013)

Academic background
- Education: Hebrew University of Jerusalem, Tel Aviv University, University of Cambridge

Academic work
- Discipline: Jewish History, Classics
- Institutions: Tel Aviv University
- Notable works: "The Organization and Social Structure of the Seleucid Army"

Bezalel Bar-Kochva (Hebrew: בצלאל בר-כוכבא; born January 1, 1941) is a professor emeritus in the Department of Jewish History at Tel Aviv University. He is a historian of the Hellenistic period, the three centuries after the conquests of Alexander the Great, and the Second Temple period of Judaism. Bar-Kochva's research focuses on Judea, the Land of Israel, diaspora Jews, and the Seleucid Empire in that era. Notably, he has written extensively on the military history of the Maccabean Revolt as well as Greek views on Judaism and Jewish adaptation to Greek culture during the Hellenistic era. He is the recipient of the 2013 Humboldt Research Award Programme.

== Biography ==
Bezalel Bar-Kochva was born in Tel Aviv (then part of Mandatory Palestine) in 1941. His family was part of the Revisionist movement within Zionism, a precursor to later right-wing Zionist movements. He received religious schooling as a child in yeshivas, including extensive study of the Talmud. Like most Israelis, he served a mandatory tour of duty in the IDF. He completed a bachelor's degree at the Hebrew University of Jerusalem in the department of Jewish History and the Bible. He studied for a master's degree, first in the Classics department at Hebrew University and then in the Department of Jewish History at Tel Aviv University, and graduated with honors. He received a doctorate in classics at the University of Cambridge in England, where he studied from 1969–1972. His doctoral dissertation was "The Organization and Social Structure of the Seleucid Army". His advisor was Guy Thompson Griffith.

In 1973, Bar-Kochva was appointed a lecturer at Tel Aviv University. In 1980, he was appointed a full professor. Bar-Kochva retired from teaching in 2011.

Bar-Kochva is married and has two daughters.

== Works ==
Bar-Kochva has written five books and about eighty academic journal articles, generally focusing on Second Temple period Judaism, the Hellenistic World, and how they intersected.

- Bar-Kochva, Bezalel (1976). The Seleucid Army. Cambridge University Press. ISBN 9780521206679.
  - An adaptation of Bar-Kochva's 1972 doctoral thesis.
- Bar-Kochva, Bezalel (1979). התקופה הסלווקית בארץ־ישראל : מחקרים ועיונים בגזירות הדת ומרד החשמונאים [The Seleucid period in Eretz Israel]. הקיבוץ המאוחד והמדור לידיעת הארץ בתנועה הקיבוצית.
- Bar-Kochva, Bezalel (1989). Judas Maccabaeus: The Jewish Struggle Against the Seleucids. Cambridge University Press. ISBN 0521323525.
  - Originally published in Hebrew in 1980 as מלחמות החשמונאים ("The Battles of the Hasmoneans, the Era of Judah Maccabee") before the 1989 revision and official translation.
- Bar-Kochva, Bezalel (1996). Pseudo Hecataeus, "On the Jews": Legitimizing the Jewish Diaspora. University of California Press. ISBN 9780520268845.
- Bar-Kochva, Bezalel (2010). The Image of the Jews in Greek Literature: The Hellenistic Period. University of California Press. ISBN 9780520943636.

The book The Image of the Jews in Greek Literature was cited in several lists of the best academic books of 2010.

Bar-Kochva won the Humboldt Prize in 2013/2014 in recognition of his scholarship, after receiving a Humboldt Fellowship from 1980–1983.
