= Tobiads =

Jewish faction in Ammon (2nd-century BCE)

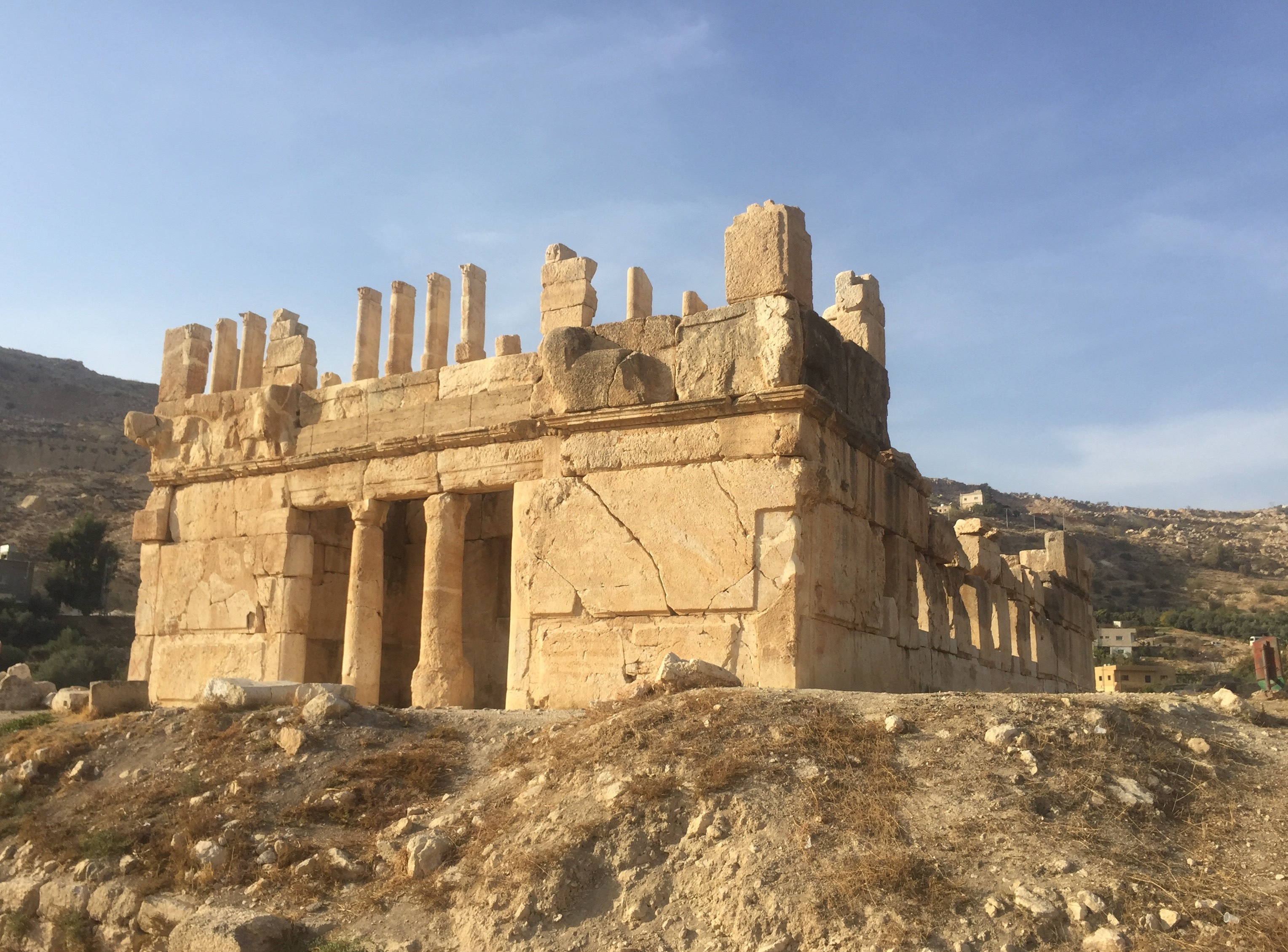
View of Qasr al-Abd ("Castle of the Servant"), an important structure of the Tobiad estate in today's Iraq al-Amir ("Caverns of the Prince").

The Tobiads were a Jewish dynasty in Ammon with origins possibly rooted in the First Temple Period, both literary and archaeological evidence point to their prominence during the rule of the Ptolemaic dynasty and at the beginning of the Hasmonean period. They were philhellene, supporters of Hellenistic Judaism, in the early years of the 2nd century BCE.

What is known about the Tobiads is a combination of references in the Zenon Papyri, accounts of Josephus (Antiquities of the Jews xii. 160-236) and the Books of Maccabees. These are supplemented by biblical references, the letters from Nimrud, the Lachish letters, and archaeological remains of the Tobiad estate in Iraq al-Amir.

== History ==
The Tobiad family, most probably named after their ancestor bearing the name Tuvia (Tobias) ("God is my good" or "Good is my God"), a name which remained in the family by papponymy and patronymy for several hundred years, received its noble status possibly during the First Temple Period and retained it until the death of their last scion, Hyrcanus. Though no complete history of the Tobiad family has survived, a partial narrative may be reconstructed, based on the many diverse literary and historical sources and archaeological remains upon which they left their mark. The written sources include the Lachish letters, the letters from Nimrud, the books of Isaiah, Nehemiah and Zachariah, the Zenon papyri, the books of Maccabees and the writings of Josephus. Archaeological remains include Qasr al-Abd and other remains from Iraq al-Amir in today's Jordan.

=== First Temple Period ===
As Benjamin Mazar established, there were influential families in the Kingdom of Judah who held estates in the Transjordan who did not necessarily lose their lands even when the Neo-Assyrian Empire destroyed the Kingdom of Israel. Mazar suggested that the Tobiads were prominent landowners in the Transjordan who were exiled from their lands by Tiglath-Pileser III. Based on the account in the book of Chronicles, he concluded that the Tobiad's rise to prominence and their ownership of land in Ammon occurred during the reign of King Uzziah of Judah and his son Jotham, who were said to have been victorious over the Ammonites. This would explain their residence in the area from shortly thereafter.

A probable mention of an ancestor to the Tobiads from the 8th century BCE is in the Book of Isaiah, within the context of the kings of Aram and Israel trying to depose the Kings of Judah and replace him with a figure by the name of Tobel:

And it came to pass in the days of Ahaz the son of Jotham, the son of Uzziah, king of Judah, that Rezin the king of Syria, and Pekah the son of Remaliah, king of Israel, went up toward Jerusalem to war against it, but could not prevail against it... Because Syria, Ephraim, and the son of Remaliah, have taken evil counsel against thee, saying, Let us go up against Judah, and vex it, and let us make a breach therein for us, and set a king in the midst of it, even the son of Tobel"

According to Naftali Herz Tur-Sinai, King Josiah's reform of the 7th century BCE effected changes in personal names, and the theophoric suffix -el was converted to the suffix -iahu. It follows that the name Tobel would be changed to Tobiah(u). Additionally, the prefix "son of" (ben) was common among high officials in Ugarit and in the biblical lists of King Solomon's officials, and as was posited by Alt, most probably denoted an office passed on from father to son, making the son of Tobel an individual of prominence and a link in a dynasty of sorts, something which would have made his replacement of the king more acceptable. Considering that some of the later kings of Israel, and even Pekah himself, had demonstrated strong ties with estate holders in trans-Jordan, it is plausible that this Tobel was one of them.

Further support for the presence of a ruler in Ammon by the name of Tobel can be found in one of the letters of Nimrud, dated from between the reigns of Tiglath-Pileser III to Sargon II, namely between 740–705 BCE, mentioning a messenger from the land of Tabel and providing an account of a skirmish between the inhabitants of Gader and the people of Moab, the latter famously bordering with Ammon. Another individual of high status named Tobiah was mentioned in two Ostraca from Lachish, dated 588 BCE, bearing the titles "Servant of the King" and "Arm of the King" (referring to King Zedekiah), possibly serving as another testimony to the political status of the Tobiads and their relationship with the Monarchy in Jerusalem, towards the end of the First Temple Period.

=== Second Temple Period ===
==== Achaemenid Empire ====
Another source about a figure with the name Tobiah, placing him at about 519 BCE, can be seen in the Book of Zechariah, where he is mentioned among other notable figures as part of "the branch" that shall rule in the future alongside the High Priest of Israel and shall rebuild the Temple in Jerusalem. Mazar proposed this individual to be the grandfather of Tobiah the Ammonite mentioned in the Book of Nehemiah.

Indeed, Tobiah the Ammonite is recognized by various scholars to be an ancestor of the clan, and he is mentioned often and in some detail in the book of Nehemiah. "Tobiah The Servant, The Ammonite", is said to have conspired in 445 BCE with other land-owners, Sanballat of Samaria and Geshem the Arabian, to oppose Nehemiah on the rebuilding of the walls of Jerusalem, possibly due to the reform on land owning that Nehemiah forced through. It is mentioned that the "sons of Tobiah" were among those who could not prove their lineage; it appears that this is referring to all the residents of the land of Tobiah, and it is possible that their lack of record is due to their residence outside of Judah or to the possibility that they neglected to take their records with them into exile. They eventually were accepted into the community, and that the aforementioned Tobiah was a Jew, was related by marriage to the High-Priest Eliashiv, was on good terms with him to the point of having an office in the Temple court, and was listed among the "Nobles of Judah" along with some of his relatives. Though it is quite obvious that he was at odds with Nehemiah, seeing as the latter expelled him from the Temple and insisted that the place be ritually cleansed thereafter, it is possible that this was due to Tobiah's attempt of insinuating himself into the Temple and even the priesthood. According to Mazar, his title "Ammonite servant" refers to an official of high standing, and despite it being used scornfully, what is meant is "Ammonite servant of the king," i.e. servant to the Achaemenid emperor, residing in Ammon. This title is generally seen to denote a rank providing ministerial services to the Persians in Ammon, and there is reason to assume that Tobiah was the governor there.

==== Hellenistic Period ====
Among the business documents of Zenon, secretary of Apollonius, chief finance minister to Ptolemy II Philadelphus, are two letters from a figure named Toubias, dated May 12 259 BCE, one addressed to Apollonius and the other to King Ptolemy. In these letters Toubias responds to a request by the king via Apollonius for him to send animals, due to the king's affinity to unusual beasts, and specifies the animals he sent, all of them domesticated. As a testimony of his high rank, Toubias addressed the king using the customary formula of subservience, though not in an exaggerated fashion, while he addressed Apollonius as an equal. Toubias is mentioned further, albeit not directly, in another papyrus dated April–May 259 BCE and written up in the fortress (Birta) of Ammon (Ammonitis), reporting the purchase of a slave-girl by Zenon from Nicanor of Cnidos, with Nicanor and two of the witnesses, one cavalryman and one Persian Jewish soldier, being "in the service of Toubias". Other papyri tell of Toubias providing Zenon and his company with pack animals ("beasts of burden") and flour on their journey through the region. Rosenberg concludes that "Toubias was head of a mixed-nationality cleruchy or military community and indulged in breeding animals and slaves and supplying them to the Ptolemaic Court. Tobias must have been an important local landowner, as he was on friendly terms not only with Appolonios but even with the ruler Ptolemy II Philadelphos".

Josephus wrote extensively about Joseph, the nephew of the High Priest Onias and the son of Tobias. Although the known individuals mentioned in the account all belonged to patronymic and papponymic dynasties, their precise identities are still disputed among modern scholars, as are the precise dates of the events. According to this narrative, Joseph was granted the rights to farm taxes from Syria, Phoenicia and Samaria instead of his uncle Onias, by King Ptolemy, due to the former's refusal to pay tribute to the latter, and did so for twenty-two years. It is further stated that Hyrcanus, the youngest of Joseph's seven sons, was sent to represent his family in Ptolemy's celebration in honor of the birth of his son. It was at this celebration that Hyrcanus reportedly supplanted his father as a tax farmer, an act which his father and brothers resented deeply. The population split into two camps, though the majority and the high priest supported the older brothers. After killing two of his brothers in battle and being refused entry into Jerusalem, Hyrcanus fled across the Jordan. They set up the family estate where he lived in conflict with his Arab neighbors for seven years. The story of Hyrcanus concludes with his suicide after Antiochus IV Epiphanes rose to power in 175 BCE and the destruction of the estate.

Despite the many questions the complete narrative raises, the historicity of its central core brought above is not to be doubted, and it can be viewed in light of the political upheavals in the region, which was a battleground for the Syrian wars between the Ptolemies and the Seleucids during the 3rd–2nd centuries BCE. It has been suggested that Onias was unwilling to pay tribute to Ptolemy due to the rise of the Seleucids and the fear of supporting their enemy, while Joseph was pro-Ptolemy. Eventually, only Hyrcanus remained loyal to the Ptolemies. At the same time, the rest of Joseph's sons supported the Seleucids. When the Seleucids emerged victorious, Hyrcanus was forced to retreat to his Trans-Jordanian estate, where he would meet his demise. However, it is doubtful that this happened in 175 BCE. As has been pointed out by Rosenberg, the Seleucids were too occupied with Jerusalem and Egypt at this point and Hyrcanus probably survived, at least till 169–168 BCE, when Antiochus IV returned and took revenge on the Jews for believing he was dead, and possibly eradicated the remaining pockets of Ptolemaic resistance at the same opportunity. It seems the estate of the Tobiads "in the Ammonite country" served as a place of refuge for the Hellenizing high priest Jason when he fled from the usurper Menelaus in 171 BCE, and was finally destroyed when Timotheus, the Seleucid general, overran the fortress and Massacred about a thousand of the "Jews in the region of Tubias" in 163 BCE.

== The Tobiad Estate ==
Within his account of the Hyrcanus chapter of the Tobiad Saga, Josephus provides a detailed description of the Tobiad estate, attributing it to Hyrcanus:

"He also erected a strong castle, and built it entirely of white stone to the very roof, and had animals of a prodigious magnitude engraven upon it. He also drew round it a great and deep canal of water. He also made caves of many furlongs in length, by hollowing a rock that was over against him; and then he made large rooms in it, some for feasting, and some for sleeping and living in. He introduced also a vast quantity of waters which ran along it, and which were very delightful and ornamental in the court. But still he made the entrances at the mouth of the caves so narrow, that no more than one person could enter by them at once. And the reason why he built them after that manner was a good one; it was for his own preservation, lest he should be besieged by his brethren, and run the hazard of being caught by them. Moreover, he built courts of greater magnitude than ordinary, which he adorned with vastly large gardens. And when he had brought the place to this state, he named it Tyre. This place is between Arabia and Judea, beyond Jordan, not far from the country of Heshbon."

Since its discovery in the nineteenth century the archaeological finds in Iraq al-Amir have been firmly tied to the description of the Tobiad estate given by Josephus.

=== Site Description ===
The most prominent building, known today as Qasr el-Abed, is a monumental, rectangular, two-story columned structure, built of massive stones weighing 15–25 tons each. The building consisted of a unit of four rooms surrounded by a wide corridor on the ground floor, above it was a second story of the same height, the interior of which collapsed. Between the two stories is a decorated frieze with a relief of lions on a string course, and above the upper story a relief of eagles and Corinthian capitals on a similar string course has been restored, topped by an entablature of triglyphs and metopes. On the ground level there were two fountains carved as felines.

Evidence of an additional smaller monumental building, bearing architectural similarities to the main structure, was unearthed at a distance of about 240 meters. Surrounding the Qasr was an artificial lake with a moat and a dam, and a monumental gateway which led to a path circumnavigating the lake.

Approximately 900 meters to the north-northeast of the Qasr are fifteen caves, six in an upper tier and nine in a lower tier. Some of these caves were used for residence while others were used for storage, one contained mangers, troughs and rings for hitching animals, one possibly served as a dovecote, one as a cistern and another possibly as a lookout post. Two of the caves, numbered 11 and 13, bear inscriptions of the name "Tobiah" in Aramaic script near their entrances. This has led scholars to offer dates for their inscription, opinions range from the 5th–3rd century BCE. In some of the caves mentioned above pottery from the 7th century BCE has been unearthed, and based on a survey of the region some have suggested dating the caves as early as the late Iron II age period.

Following the path out of Iraq al-Amir is an aqueduct which was only a part of a larger water system from the time of Hyrcanus, portions of which are still used today for the irrigation of the fields in the area. In addition to the aqueduct, a doric columned structure containing a stepped tank and two channels was discovered to the north of the cave complex, it too has been dated to the time of Hyrcanus and may have been used as a ritual bath or a settling basin.

According to Rosenberg, the site gradually deteriorated due to a combination of human intervention, such as the attack of the Seleucid general Timotheus in 163 BCE, and natural causes, such as water damage in 170 BCE and a succession of earthquakes in 30–31 BCE, 363 CE and 551 CE.

=== Site design and ornamentation ===
In certain ways the Qasr was built according to the standard of oriental sanctuaries and royal palaces. Both the main building and the monumental gateway were decorated with lions and eagles, animals which were represented in sanctuaries and belong to the royal bestiary, and which symbolize the strength of the divine or human royal power. The Tobiad estate is similar to the Iranian paradeisos, a Greek term used by Josephus when describing the estate, which combines luxurious buildings and natural surroundings, and is possibly modeled after the residence of the Satrap in Sidon.

The architecture and ornamentation of the Qasr was predominantly Hellenistic, and in many ways Alexandrian, in style. This is demonstrated by the structure of the main building which included a large entrance hall with a two columned portal, rooms on either side and a large opening flanked by two smaller ones between the entrance and the main hall. It is further demonstrated by the pilasters as well as the Doric triglyph frieze with the Corinthian epistyle, cornice and capitals with a plant motif, consisting of a stem surrounded by a small ring of dividing leaves topped with two opposing flower and leaf patterns surmounted by tendrils, as opposed to the Graeco-Roman capital which had central volutes. In addition, the lions and eagles on the wide frieze were fashioned in a freer style than that of the stiff Persian decorations, further implying Hellenistic influence. The mixture of both eastern and western styles in the Tobiad estate is thus seen as an example of the considerable influence the Ptolemaic rule had on the development of Jewish art.

== Narrative in Josephus ==
During the reign of the Egyptian king Ptolemy and his wife Cleopatra, the high priest Onias refused to pay the Jewish tribute of twenty talents which his father, Simon the Just, had always given from his own means. In his anger the king sent Athenion as a special envoy to Jerusalem, threatening to seize the land of the Jews and to hold it by force of arms if the money was not forthcoming. Although the high priest disregarded this threat, the people were greatly excited, whereupon Onias' nephew Joseph, a son of Tobias and a man greatly beloved and respected for his wisdom and piety, reproached his uncle for bringing disaster upon the people, declaring, moreover, that Onias ruled the Jews and held the high priestly office solely for the sake of gain. He told him, furthermore, that he ought at all events to go to the king and petition him to remit the tribute-money, or at least a part of it. Onias, on the other hand, replied that he did not wish to rule, and expressed himself as willing to resign the high-priesthood, although he refused to petition the king. He permitted Joseph, however, to go to Ptolemy, and also to speak to the people. Joseph quieted the Jews, and received the envoy hospitably in his own house, besides giving him costly presents, so that, when Athenion returned to Alexandria, he informed the king of the coming of Joseph, whom he styled the ruler (προστάτης) [prostatis] of the people. Shortly afterward Joseph started on his journey, having first raised a loan of about 20,000 drachmae in Samaria, although he was obliged to submit to the jeers of prominent men of Syria and Phoenicia, who were visiting Alexandria in order to farm the taxes, and who derided him on account of his insignificant appearance.

Not finding Ptolemy at Alexandria, Joseph went to meet him at Memphis, where the king graciously granted him a seat in his own chariot, together with the queen and Athenion. His cleverness won for him the monarch's friendship; and by his offer of 16,000 talents against the 8,000 bid by his opponents he secured the contract for farming the taxes, the king and queen becoming his sureties, since he did not have sufficient ready money. He left Alexandria with 500 talents and 2,000 soldiers, and by punishing all who opposed him in Ashkelon and Scythopolis and confiscating their estates, he made himself feared through all the cities of Syria and Phoenicia, while the great fortune which his extortions won was held secure by his continual presents to the king, queen, and courtiers, so that he retained his office of tax-farmer until his death, twenty-two years later. By his first wife Joseph had seven sons. At Alexandria he became infatuated with a dancer, for whom his brother Solymius, who lived in the city, substituted his own daughter, the child of this union being Hyrcanus, who was his father's favorite son and consequently the object of his brothers' enmity.

Josephus describes Joseph as "a good man, and of great magnanimity" who "brought the Jews out of a state of poverty and meanness to one that was more splendid. He retained the farming of the taxes of Syria, and Phenicia, and Samaria twenty-two years."

On the birth of a prince, Joseph feeling too old to visit Alexandria and his other sons likewise declining to go, sent Hyrcanus to bear his congratulations to the court. Arion, Joseph's representative in Alexandria, however, refused to allow Hyrcanus money, and the latter accordingly put him in chains, not only escaping punishment from the king, but even winning both his favor and that of the courtiers, whose aid his brothers had secretly invoked against him. The king sent letters recommending him warmly to his father. When Hyrcanus returned to Judaea, his older brothers met him with armed resistance. Hyrcanus won the battle and killed two of his half-brothers but as the city of Jerusalem refused to admit him, he settled beyond the Jordan.

Shortly afterwards, Seleucus IV Philopator (187–175 BC) became king of the Seleucid kingdom. Hyrcanus's father Joseph and his uncle, Onias II, also died. The high-priesthood passed to Simon II (219–199 BC). Hyrcanus continued his warfare against the Arabs beyond the Jordan and, in the vicinity of Heshbon, built the castle of Tyre, and ruling the district east of the Jordan for seven years during the reign of Seuleucus IV. Ptolemy V Epiphanes (205–182) also died, leaving two young sons. When Antiochus Epiphanes became king of Syria (175–164 BC), Hyrcanus realized that he would be unable to vindicate himself for his murderous attacks upon the Arabs, he committed suicide, and his property was seized by Antiochus.

== Comparison of accounts ==
The most serious difficulty, however, is the chronology. An old interpolator of Josephus advanced the opinion that the king mentioned in the story was Ptolemy III Euergetes (246–222 BC). However, this monarch was not the consort of a Cleopatra, nor was his immediate successor Seleucus IV. The only ruler to whom the narrative can properly refer is Ptolemy V Epiphanes (205–182), who in 193 BCE married Cleopatra, the daughter of Antiochus III. In that case, however, Joseph could not have farmed the Egyptian taxes, since Cœle-Syria was then under Syrian, and not under Egyptian, suzerainty, while the assertion that the two powers had divided the revenues of the country is merely an attempt on the part of Josephus to evade the difficulty. Nor was the period between Ptolemy V's marriage (193) and his death (182) sufficiently long to agree with the statement concerning the length of time during which Joseph farmed the taxes (twenty-two years), and still less could Hyrcanus have reached manhood in so short a space.

Büchler, therefore, finds himself compelled to place Joseph's term of office between 219 and 199, although this stultifies the statement of Josephus regarding a division of the taxes.

== Critical views ==
Adolf Büchler's research established the probable historicity of the account of the Tobiads. 1 Maccabees makes no mention of these events. The quarrels were factional ones, the issue being whether the old and popular government of the Ptolemies should continue, or whether the Jews should deliver themselves over to the Syrian kings and their Hellenization.

When Jason and Menelaus struggled for the dominant power in Jerusalem, which was, according to Büchler, political office (the προστασία [prostasia] mentioned in the account of the Tobiads), and no longer the high priesthood, the sons of Tobias (Τωβίου παῖδες) [Tobiou paides] took sides with Menelaus

Wellhausen denied both the historicity and the value of the narrative, although he thinks that the portion dealing with the period of Seleucus IV and Antiochus IV may be trustworthy, and he regards the suicide of Hyrcanus as probable, since the latter supported the Ptolemies against the new régime of the Syrians, and might consequently fear the revenge of Antiochus IV. II Macc. iii. 11 mentions money deposited by Hyrcanus, the son of Tobias, "a man of great dignity", taking it for granted that a friendship existed between Onias II and Hyrcanus, a supposition which is very reasonable, since only the other Tobiads, the brothers of Hyrcanus, were involved in quarrels with the legitimate high priest. That Hyrcanus is called the son of Tobias, and not of Joseph, is due, Wellhausen holds, to mere abbreviation, and does not imply any divergency in the two accounts.

Willreich distinguishes a threefold tradition concerning the Tobiads, the first being that of the Pseudo-Hecataeus (according to Willreich's interpretation), which represents Onias as a worthy man, and attributes to the Tobiads all the misfortunes which befell the Jews. The account of Josephus, on the other hand, which represents Onias as a weakling and the Tobiads as the promoters of Israel's welfare, is drawn from Samaritan sources. With this theory Büchler also agrees, thus explaining why Joseph sought aid in Samaria, and why the account fails to express disapproval of the non-Jewish conduct of Joseph, who ate at the court of an Egyptian king and had dealings with Gentiles. Willreich likewise brings the Tobiads into association both with Tobiah, the servant mentioned by Nehemiah as an Ammonite (ii. 19), who consequently came from the east-Jordanic district, and with the Tubieni, who were the enemies of the Jews. Although Willreich does not absolutely deny the historicity of the narrative, since the castle of Hyrcanus has been discovered in modern times, he regards Joseph and Hyrcanus as mere names, representing in part Jason and Menelaus. The third form of the tradition is that of Jason of Cyrene, on which the second Book of the Maccabees is based; and Schlatter is even of the opinion that Josephus himself drew his account of the Tobiads from this same source.

Büchler regards the struggle between the Tobiads and the Oniads as a contest between Ptolemean and Seleucid supremacy in Jerusalem. According to the same scholar, moreover, Menelaus and Jason themselves were Tobiads, although this is denied by Schürer.

Many points of the Tobiad problem still await solution.
