= Maccabee campaigns of 163 BC =

Battles in the Maccabean Revolt

Maccabee Campaigns of 163 BCE
- Part of the Maccabean Revolt
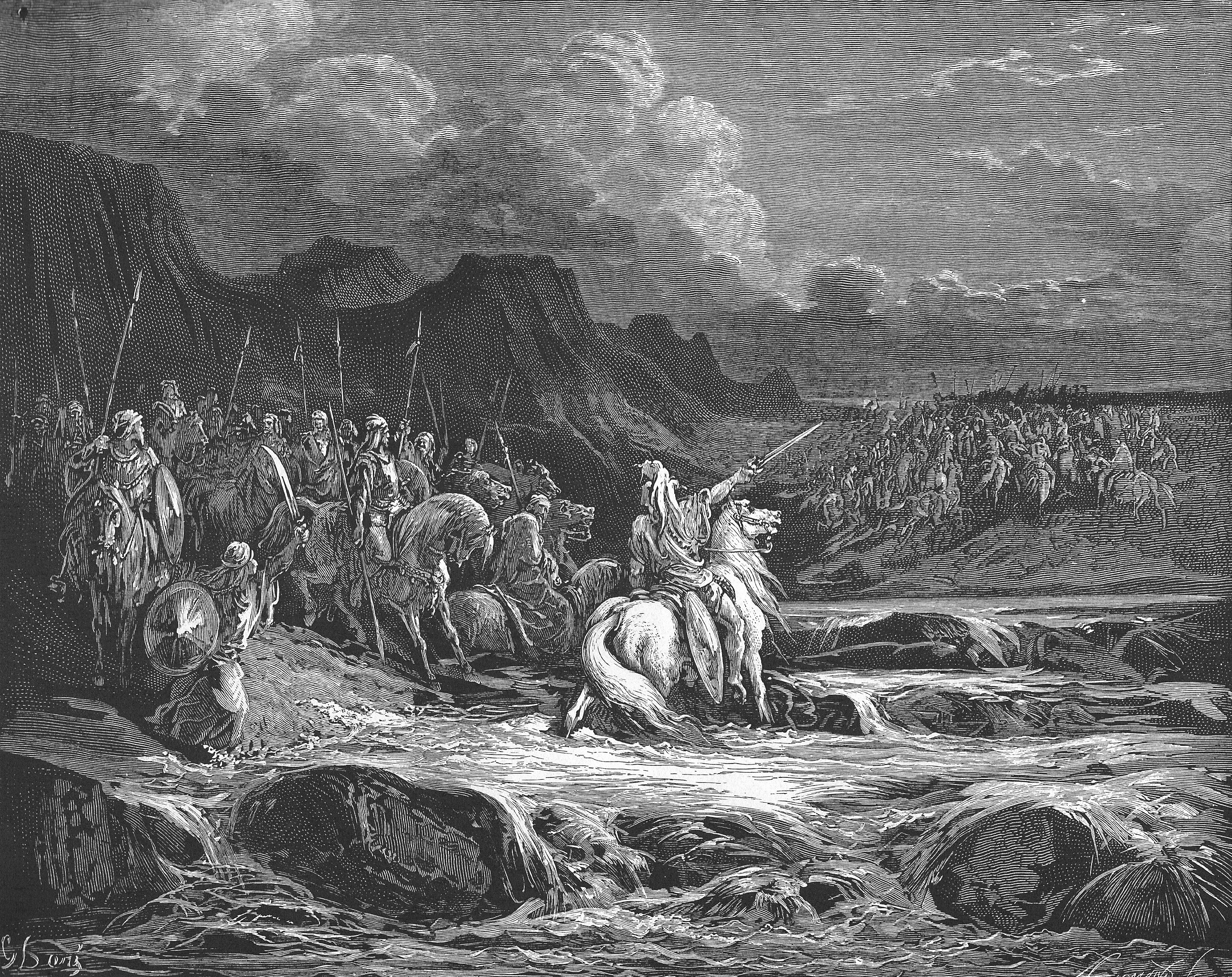
- Judas Maccabeus pursuing Timotheus by Gustave Doré
Date	163 BCE
Location	Ammon, Gilead, Galilee, Idumea and Judea's coast
Result	Inconclusive

Belligerents
Maccabean rebels	Seleucid Empire

Commanders and leaders
Judas Maccabeus; Simon Thassi; Jonathan Apphus	Timothy of Ammon Gorgias

Strength
Unknown	Unknown

Casualties and losses
Unknown	Unknown

During the Maccabean Revolt against the Seleucid Empire, there were a series of campaigns in 163 BC in regions outlying Judea - Ammon, Gilead, Galilee, Idumea, and Judea's coastal plain, a wider region usually referred to as either Palestine or Eretz Israel. The Maccabee rebels fought multiple enemies: Seleucid garrisons and hired mercenaries under a commander named Timothy of Ammon, non-Jewish inhabitants hostile to the Maccabees and their Jewish neighbors, and possibly the Tobiad Jews, a clan that generally favored the ruling Seleucid government. During 163 BC, the main Seleucid armies composed of Greeks were elsewhere, so the Maccabees were free to expand their influence against their neighbors.

The Maccabees did not in general hold the territory they fought in during this period, but rather engaged in raids on opposing power centers and retributive attacks on anti-Jewish populations. The book 1 Maccabees describes a vicious campaign of extermination on both sides: the Gentiles were out to slaughter the Jews, and the Maccabees massacred Gentiles they believed involved, burning down their towns as intimidation and revenge. The Maccabees invited Jews living in hostile territory back to Judea as refugees and escorted them back under the safety of their army.

== Primary sources ==
The campaigns against Timothy (Greek: Timotheus) and the local Gentiles (non-Jews) are recorded in the books of 1 Maccabees (1 Maccabees 5), 2 Maccabees (2 Maccabees 10:14–38, 2 Maccabees 12:10–37), and Josephus's Antiquities of the Jews Book 12, Chapter 8. 2 Maccabees also mentions Timothy and his armies briefly in passing in while discussing the Battle of Emmaus (2 Maccabees 8:30–8:33); this is generally assumed to be a "flash-forward" in time to discuss Timothy's defeat rather than actually happening during the Emmaus campaign of 164 BC by most historians, however.

== Background ==
In 164 BC, the Seleucids sent a major expedition to restore order to the Judean countryside led personally by Regent Lysias, who administered the western half of the Seleucid Empire while King Antiochus IV was on campaign in the eastern provinces. However, the Seleucid force was forced to withdraw by a combination of the Battle of Beth Zur as well as the death of Antiochus IV. Lysias returned to the capital Antioch to stave off any succession challenges to the young boy king Antiochus V Eupator and thus defend his own authority as Regent of the entire Empire. The Maccabees took Jerusalem and were now able to extend their authority while the main Seleucid army was distracted; only local garrisons and hostile local militias were left to stop them during the next year of 163 BC. In this time period, only Judea truly had a strong majority of Jews; many outlying regions, while having substantial Jewish populations, had many non-Jews. Relations apparently collapsed between Jews and Gentiles during the radicalization spurred by the revolt, so the Maccabees went on campaign to protect the outlying Jews and attack hostile Gentiles.

== Campaigns ==
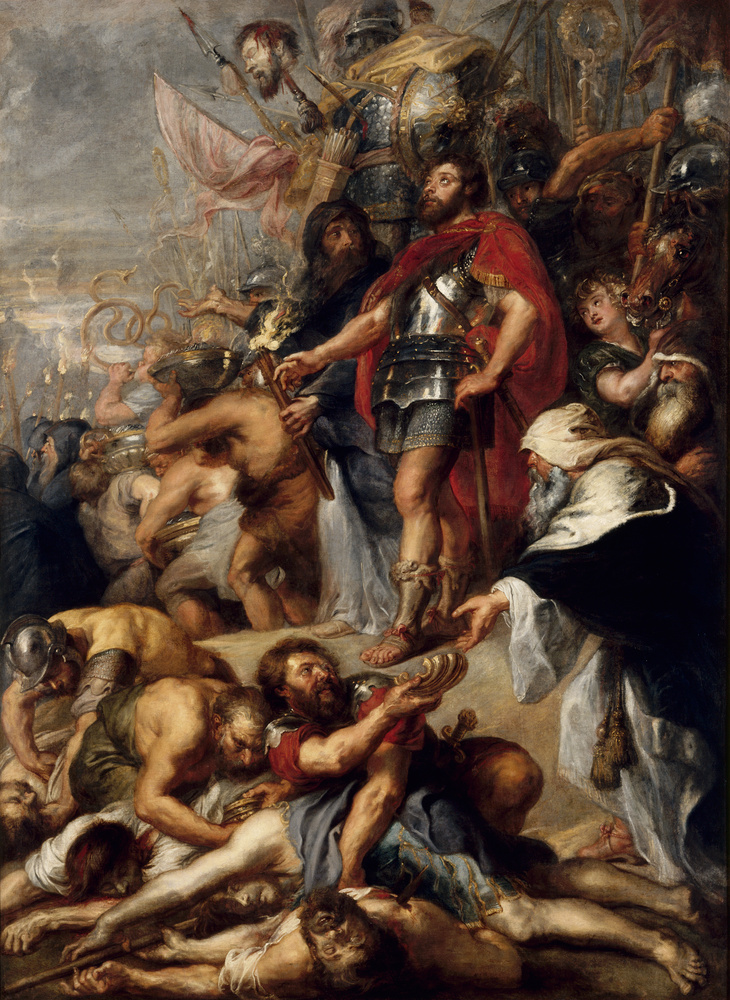
The Triumph of Judas Maccabeus, a 1630s work by Peter Paul Rubens. The scene depicted is from 2 Maccabees: After a campaign in Idumea, some Jews fell against Gorgias's forces. According to the epitomist, these Jews died because they had idols on them; Judas makes a sin offering in recompense.

=== Idumea ===
The Maccabees under Judas Maccabeus (Judah Maccabee) attacked south of Judea to Idumea, occupied by the Edomites and referred to archaically as the "descendants of Esau" in an attempt to make the text more befitting of the deeds of the heroes of Hebrew Bible scripture. Judas's forces would later return toward the end of 163 BC. Like many of the conflicts in that year, these battles appear to have been closer to a raid than an invasion; 1 Maccabees describes the second attack as "He [Judas] struck Hebron and its villages and tore down its strongholds and burned its towers on all sides." 2 Maccabees also mentions a campaign against the Idumeans; according to it, anti-Maccabee Judeans who had fled after the Maccabee capture of Jerusalem had found sanctuary among the Idumeans. These exiles had endeavored to keep up the war against the Hasmoneans, which is why Judas led the campaign against Idumea. A siege of two towers took longer than expected and some of the enemy escaped; according to 2 Maccabees, this was due to the malfeasance of the commanders who accepted bribes, but also fits with the trend of the authors for any setbacks to be attributed to commanders other than Judas, who is consistently portrayed as both pious and a masterful general.

=== Ammon and Gilead ===
In Ammon Judas and the Maccabees clashed with both the Baneites, a hostile clan, and Seleucid forces under Timothy of Ammon. While the regular army was not present, Timothy would have still had garrisons composed of locals, as well as likely some mercenaries under his command. They attacked Jazer successfully, but returned to Judea afterward. Farther north, in the Gilead, local Jews fortified themselves in a stronghold called Dathema after fighting with local Gentiles and Timothy's forces, and requested the Maccabees return and offer aid. Judas and his brother Jonathan Apphus returned with 8,000 soldiers. They met peaceably with the Nabateans and aided fortified Jews in the Gilead and the Land of Tob. At Bozrah, the Maccabees "killed every male by the edge of the sword, (..) seized all its spoils, and burned it with fire". Timothy's army had besieged Dathema with siege weaponry, but Judas relieved the fortress and drove off Timothy's force. The Maccabees then took the towns of Maapha, Chaspho, Maked, Bosor, and other towns of Gilead, plundering and massacring as they went. Timothy and his forces, supplanted by mercenaries, camped across the river at Raphon; the two sides fought again, and Timothy was again forced back. The Maccabees burned the town of Carnaim afterward. While escorting Jewish refugees back to Judea, the Maccabees ran into resistance at the town of Ephron. The Maccabees attacked it, plundered and razed the town, and killed the male inhabitants. The refugees returned to Judea safely and successfully. According to 2 Maccabees, the refugees arrived just in time to celebrate the Feast of Weeks.

According to the book of 2 Maccabees, the Maccabees passed through land of the Tobiad Jews in the southern reaches of Ammon, who had a temple at Iraq al-Amir near Jazer that the Maccabees had visited earlier. The Tobiads generally favored the Seleucids, but it is unclear if any fighting happened between them and the Maccabee forces. The depiction of Judas offering terms to the town of Ephron, but then burning it down and killing the male inhabitants after negotiations failed, fits with the author of 1 Maccabees showing Judas as the perfect Biblical warrior; this is a treatment that Deuteronomy 20:10–20 from Hebrew Scripture mandates for proper military behavior.

=== Galilee ===
Simon Thassi led 3,000 soldiers to Galilee to fight there. He pursued the local Gentiles "to the gate of Ptolemais" although did not besiege the city; he too escorted back a large group of Jewish refugees to Judea with him.

=== Coastal Greek towns ===
The coast of the Eastern Mediterranean was in this era dominated by Greek-friendly cities who participated in the broader Greek world trading network; the Seleucids referred to the region as Paralia. While Jews existed in these cities, they were a minority, and the cities were generally hostile to the Maccabee cause. Commanders named Joseph and Azariah attacked to the west of Judea at the town of Jamnia (Yavneh), but were repulsed: according to 1 Maccabees by Seleucid general Gorgias himself, who served in other battles of the Revolt such as the Battle of Emmaus. The Maccabees suffered 2,000 dead in their defeat and retreat. Judas would later return personally to the area, but apparently lost some troops near Marisa; he continued on to Azotus and successfully plundered the town before returning to Judea.

2 Maccabees describes a raid against Joppa and Jamnia after the residents there murdered some of the local Jews. In it Judas penetrates the cities and burns the ships in their harbors. He kills the murderers in Joppa, but declines to conquer either city. The historicity on such successful raids is considered chancy as 1 Maccabees clearly describes Jamnia as not falling to the Maccabees, and Joppa was a fortified port in the era, unlikely to be easily raided.

The book of 1 Maccabees archaically refers to the area as the "land of the Philistines" for the same reason as calling the Edomites the "sons of Esau"; the Philistines were long relegated to ancient history, but it made for a Biblical allusion to describe the territory and frame the Maccabee expedition in the language of ancient Jewish heroes. The author of 1 Maccabees also blames the priests killed near Marisa for disobeying orders out of a desire to do a brave deed. While possible, the author is sufficiently biased in favor of Judas Maccabeus that it is also possible that the author interpreted any setbacks as due to defiance of his orders rather than other factors.

== Scholarly analysis ==
1 Maccabees contains brief letters requesting help from the Maccabees against Timothy from the Jews of Gilead at Dathema, as well as another letter from the Jews of Galilee requesting aid there. John Grainger, a historian skeptical of the reliability of the books of Maccabees, argues these letters were potentially postfactum inventions made to provide additional justification for the expeditions. While granting that the situation between Jews and Gentiles was likely tense, Grainger believes that the expeditions were more likely driven by a combination of pre-emptive defensive moves to weaken nearby sources of Seleucid power, an attempt to gather needed manpower for Judas's armies by going on a recruiting drive, and a looting expedition. He also argues that these raids probably did not stretch as far as claimed. The book 1 Maccabees was likely written under the reign of John Hyrcanus, an era where the Hasmonean state had expanded its borders beyond Judea. To Grainger, the book may be trying to justify the conquests in the time of the author (~130–100 BC) by prefiguring them in Judas's time and giving them a moral arc of rescue of fellow Jews and punishment to enemies of the Jews.
