= Dathema =

Fortress in Gilead

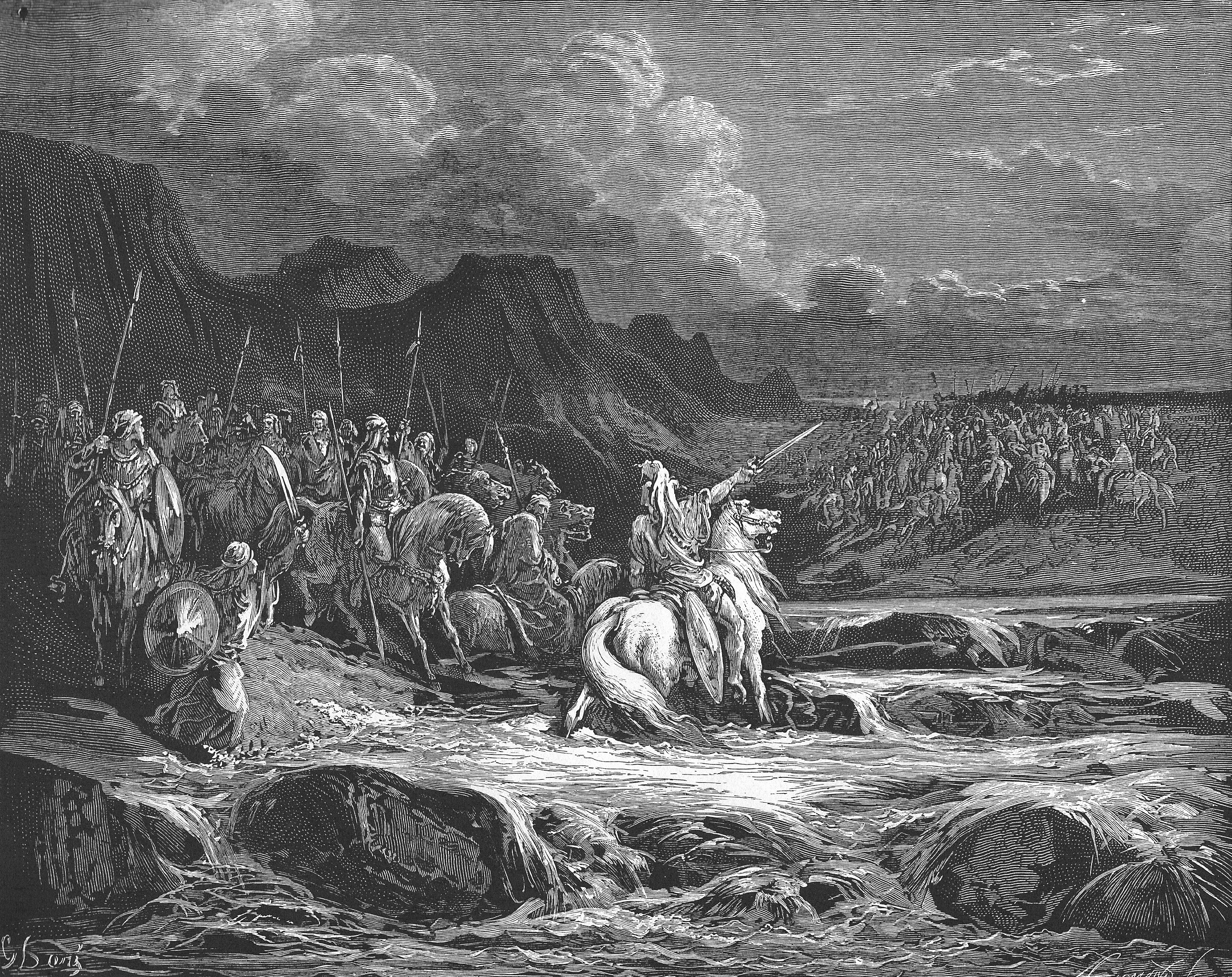
Judas Maccabeus pursuing Timotheus, by Gustave Doré

Dathema or Diathema was the name of a fortress in Gilead to which the local Jews fled when hard pressed by Timothy of Ammon during the Maccabee campaigns of 163 BC in the Maccabean Revolt. There they shut themselves in, prepared for a siege, and sent to Judas Maccabeus (Judah Maccabee) for aid. Dathema was one of many places in a similar plight, and seems, from the description of it, to have been strongly enough fortified to necessitate "an innumerable people bearing ladders and other engines of war" to take it. Judas attacked in three divisions, drove off Timotheus, killed eight thousand of the enemy, and saved the city. The Peshitta reads "Rametha," from which George Adam Smith infers that it was perhaps Ramath Gilead. Conder suggests the modern Dameh on the southern border of the Lejah district. It can not, however, be positively identified.
