= Apollonius (dioiketes) =

Public official in 3rd century BC Ptolemaic Egypt

Apollonius Ἀπολλώνιος
- Chief finance minister
- Dynasty: Ptolemaic dynasty
- Pharaoh: Ptolemy II Philadelphus, Ptolemy III Euergetes
- Born: Kaunos, Asia Minor

Apollonius (or Apollonios, Greek: Ἀπολλώνιος; 3rd century BC) was the dioiketes or chief finance minister of Egypt during the reign of Ptolemy II Philadelphus (r. 283–246 B.C.). Little is known about his personal life; in ancient documents, he is called simply "Apollonius the dioiketes" without recording his home city or his father's name. But a great amount of information has survived about his public role, in the archive of papyri kept by his assistant Zenon.

Apollonius was dioiketes from about 262 to 245 B.C. As well as his official role, he was an important merchant and land-owner. He owned estates both abroad in Galilee and in Philadelphia in Egypt. In 252 B.C. he accompanied Berenice, the daughter of Ptolemy, as far as Sidon before her marriage to the Seleucid king Antiochus II. Although the extent of his influence over the king's policies has been disputed, it was during his term of office that the economic and administrative system of the Ptolemaic Kingdom was fully developed, which made the kingdom by far the most prosperous of the Hellenistic states.

As dioiketes he was succeeded by Sosibius.

== The Zenon Papyri ==
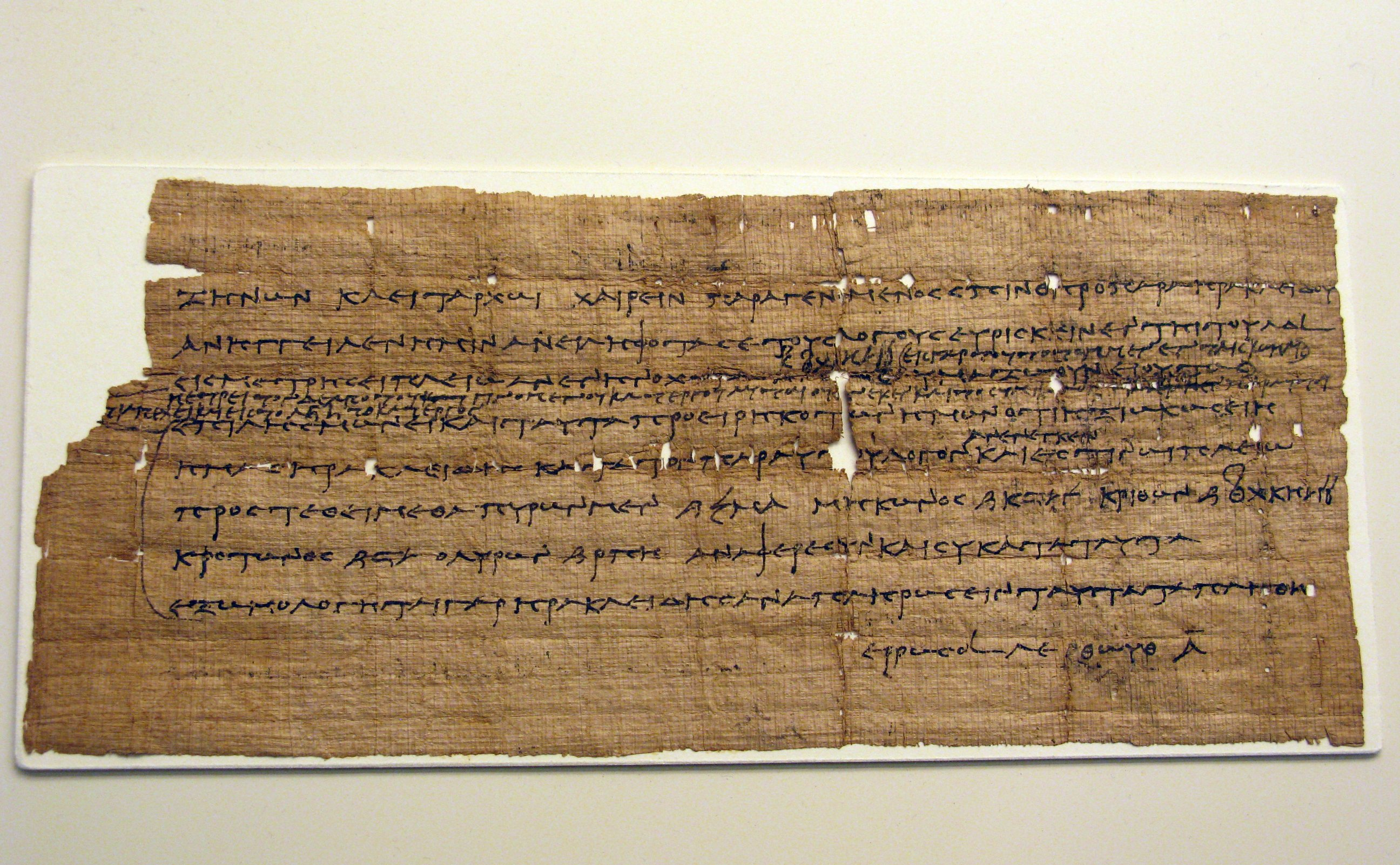
Fragment of a papyrus letter discussing tax issues from the Zenon Archive (National Archaeological Museum, Athens)

Apollonius's work for Ptolemy II Philadelphus was recorded in considerable detail by his private secretary, Zeno (or Zenon, Greek: Ζήνων). In the course of his duties, Zeno made copious written records of various legal and financial transactions between citizens, as well as detailed descriptions of the construction of theatres, gymnasiums, palaces and baths of the new town of Philadelphia on the edge of Faiyum. The documents were stored in an archive and lay forgotten for over 2100 years.

During the winter of 1914-1915, a cache of over 2,000 papyrus documents was uncovered by Egyptian agricultural labourers who were digging for sebakh near Kôm el-Kharaba el-Kebir. Upon examination by Egyptology scholars, these documents were found to be records written by Zeno in Greek and Demotic. These papyri, now referred to as the Zenon Archive or the Zenon Papyri, have provided historians with a detailed record of Apollonius's role and of 3rd-century BC Philadelphia society and economy. The papyri, now referred to as the Zenon Archive or the Zenon Papyri, were translated into English by the British papyrologists Campbell Cowan Edgar and Arthur Surridge Hunt.
