= Wadi Al-Seer =

Coordinates: 31.9500°N 35.8167°E

Wadi Al-Seer وادي السير
- Area
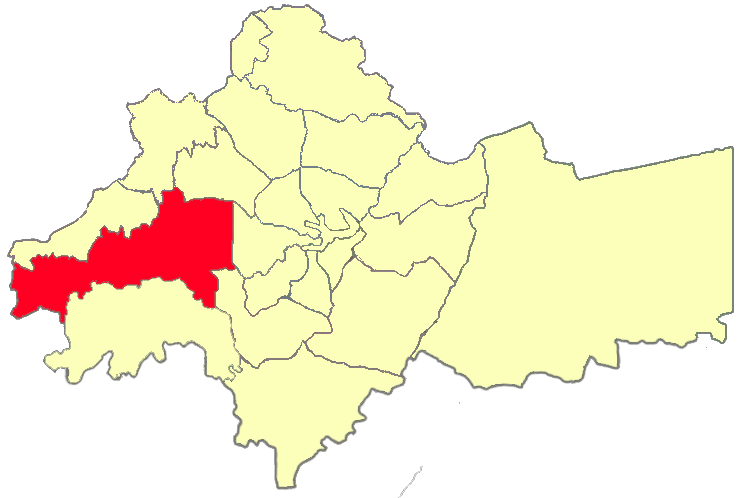
- Wadi Al-Seer location in Amman Governorate

- Flag
- Interactive map of Wadi Al-Seer
- Country: Jordan
- Governorate: Amman Governorate

Area
  - Area: 80 km^{2} (31 sq mi)
- Elevation: 900–1,000 m (3,000–3,300 ft)

Population
  - Urban: 241,830

Wadi Al-Seer or Wadi as-Seer (Arabic: وادي السير, meaning "Valley of the Orchards") is a valley (wadi) west of Amman, which gave its name to one of the twenty-two districts of the Greater Amman Municipality in Jordan. It is said to have taken its name from a prehistoric queen that ruled the area, Queen Seer. The district consists of ten neighborhoods, some of which are residential, others commercial or mixed.

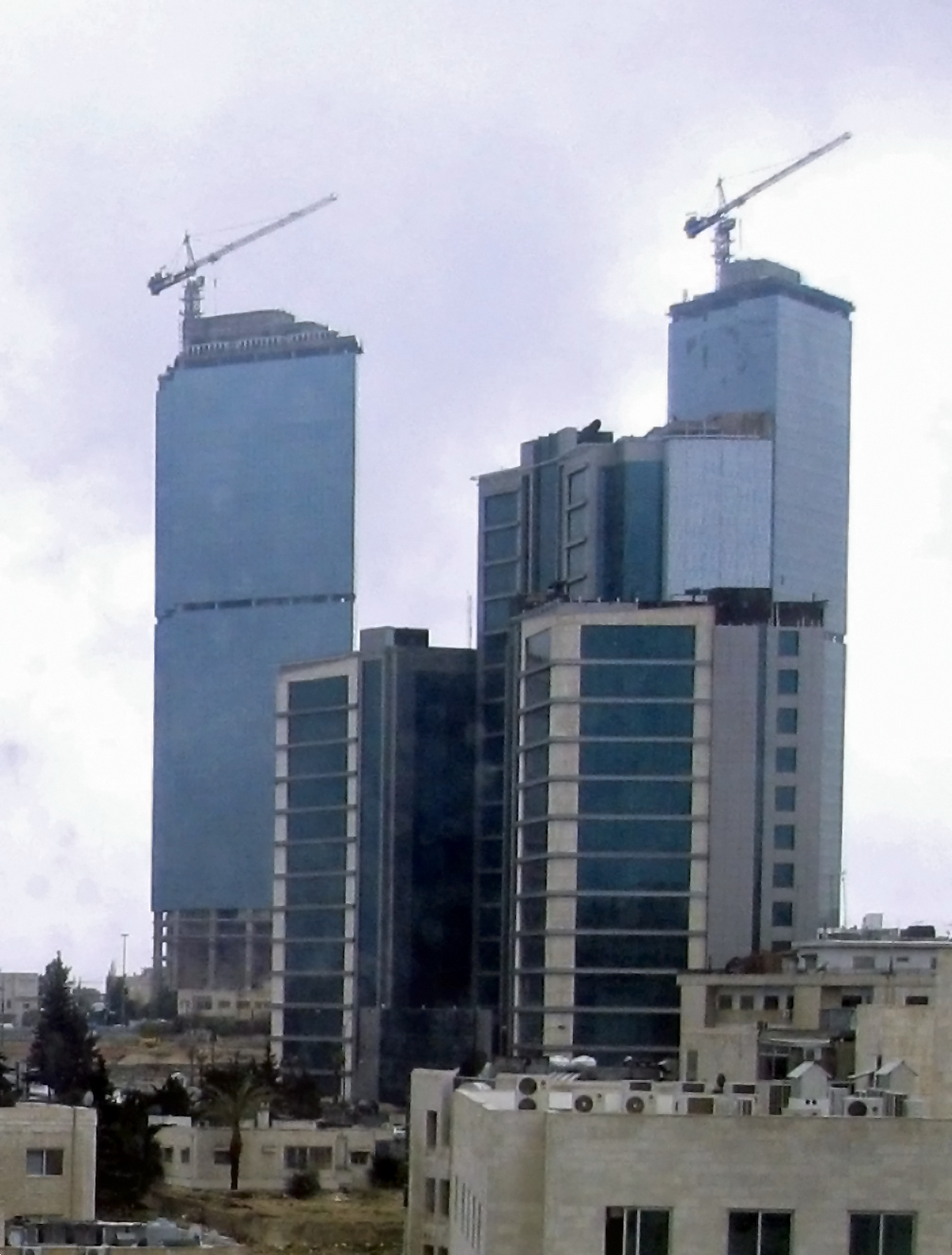
Jordan Gate Towers

== The valley: location and history ==
Wadi as-Sir (approximate phonetic transcription Wâdī es-Sîr) is a valley descending along the eastern slopes of the Jordan Rift Valley westwards towards the Jordan River.

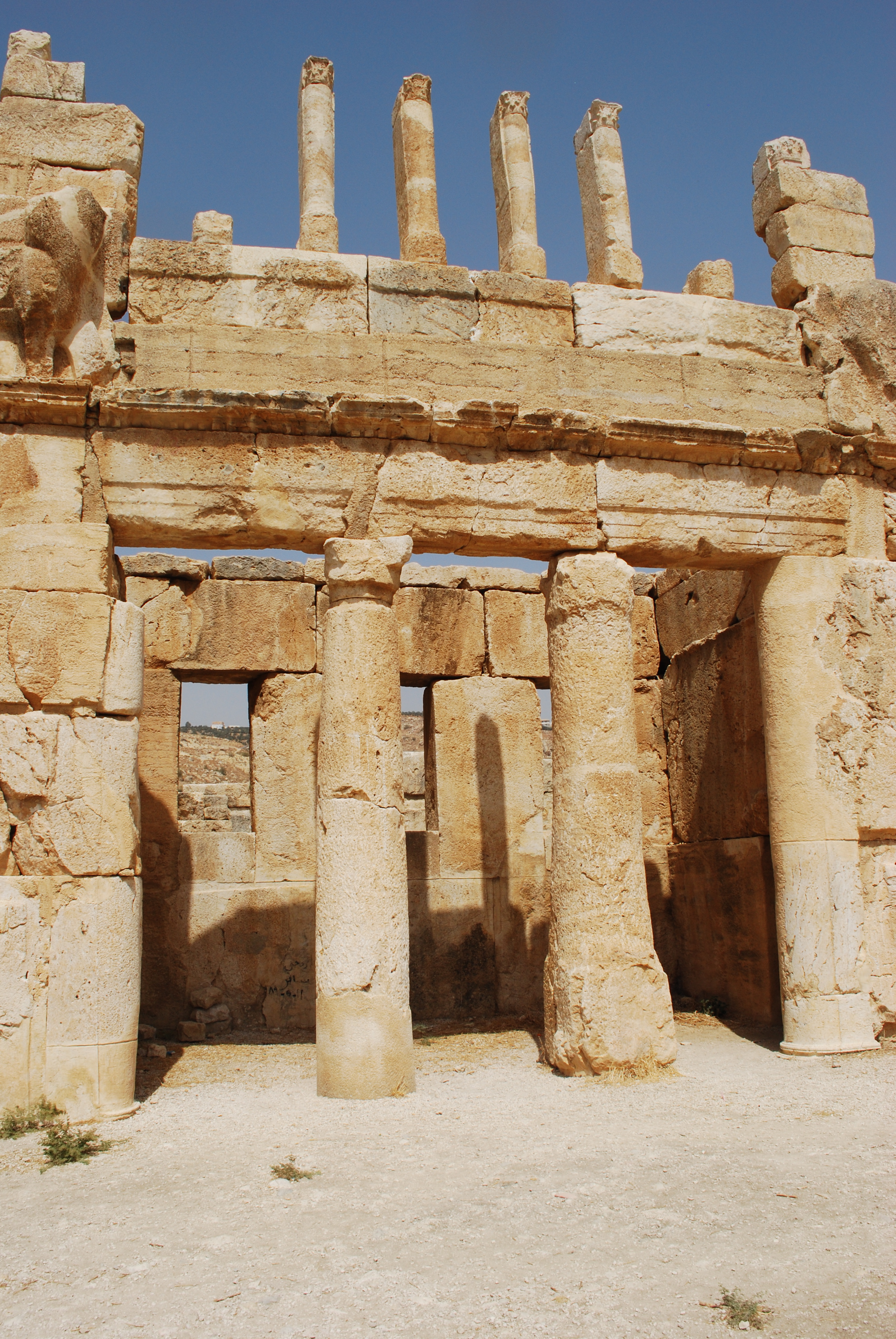
Qasr al-Abd, a Hellenistic palace at Iraq el-Amir

The valley offers access to the impressive Hellenistic-period ruins of Iraq el-Amir.

In 1880, Circassians resettled by the Ottomans established a village in the valley, generally known as Wadi Sir or Wadi es-Sir, but known to the British during the First World War's Sinai and Palestine campaign as Ain es Sir. The valley and the village became important landmarks during three British attacks, the first and second in spring, and the third in autumn of 1918. Maps and war memoirs are using various spellings (Wadi, Wady, es Sir, Es Sir, Seer etc.). Meanwhile the old village has grown and become part of Greater Amman as Bayader Wadi Al-Seer (see section below).

== Neighborhoods (Amman) ==
Wadi Al-Seer district contains ten neighbourhoods; Al-Rawabi, Swefieh, Jandaweel, Al-Rawnaq, Al-Sahl, Al-Diyar, Bayader, Al-Sina'a, Al-Kursi and west Umm Uthaina.

=== Bayader Wadi Al-Seer ===
Bayader Wadi as-Seer neighbourhood is a small low-income town on the outskirts of the Greater Amman Municipality. It contains some Ottoman-era buildings and mosques from the early 20th century. Some 10 kilometres outside Wadi as-Seer are the ruins of the Qasr al-Abd castle and the related caves of Iraq al-Amir. Wadi as-Seer city contains a well known historical courthouse, an old fort, an entire Ottoman-style neighbourhood standing on extremely steep hills that are enveloped by European narrow streets.

The area is on the extreme outskirts of the city{ and overlooks some of the mountains that the city is built on.

The name of the neighbourhood is an archaic Levantine compound noun, it roughly translates to "the Threshing Floor of the Valley of the Orchards".

=== Sweifieh ===
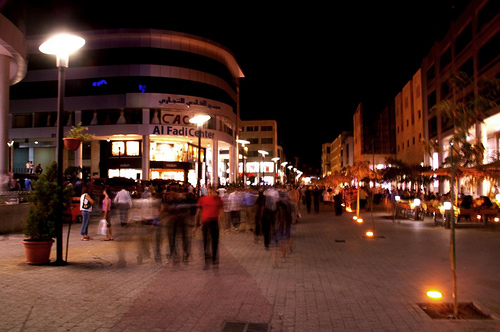
Sweifieh, the pedestrian zone around 3 a.m.

Sweifieh, a well known and culturally significant neighborhood, is located in the Wadi as-Seer district. The country's best-known place for entertainment, clubbing and shopping, Sweifieh is home to several high-end clubs, bars, hotels, restaurants and malls and is inhabited mostly by upper middle-income residents. The malls of Sweifieh are usually filled by families during daytime, and by a younger crowd during nighttime. Albaraka Mall stands out with its glass architecture and popular cinema complex.

== Culture ==
Wadi as-Seer has a quite distinctive culture which shapes that of the rest of the city. The municipality has a large number of North Caucasian and North American residents. The Sweifieh district is also home to the fashion industry of the municipality and the rest of the city. Wadi as-Seer city has historic architecture, such as the old courthouse, the old fort and Ottoman styled neighbourhood which stands on the extremely steep western hills.

However, Wadi as-Seer's outer neighborhoods do not affect the culture of the area, due to the fact that a high percentage of the population is low-income, unlike the rich and wealthy inhabitants of Abdoun and Sweifieh. In general, the culture of Sweifieh and Abdoun is based upon media, fashion, finance and shopping; which is a very important aspect of the everyday lives of that areas' residents. The film and music studios in the city are located in these areas, and most of the city's artists and celebrities prefer to reside here. Some of the disadvantages of residing in the area are the congested population and non-stop traffic.

=== Education ===
Wadi as-Seer district has many renowned schools, such as the English School, the British International Community School, the Modern American School, the Greek Orthodox Experimental Patriarchal "Patriarch Diodoros I" School, and the Franciscan Sisters School.

== Climate ==
The climate in Wadi as-Seer is quite similar to the rest of the city, with variations of 5 degrees Celsius between some of its districts. Due to the quite high elevation of the valley, it sees warm and pleasant summers and cold rainy winters with the occasional snow. The Abdoun Valley sees warmer temperatures than the rest of the district due to its elevation but receives approximately the same amount of precipitation during the winter. The valley isn't usually windy during the winter, but the summers enjoy beautiful breezes day and night long. On an average Summer the temperature would range from 15 °C (59 °F) to 30 °C (86 °F), and typical Winter temperatures range from −4 °C (25 °F) to 6 °C (43 °F), not counting intense heatwaves or strong cold fronts. The entire city generally and Wadi as-Seer specifically suffer from strong fog episodes during the winter, and somewhat intense haze or smog during the summer.
