= Qasr al-Abd =

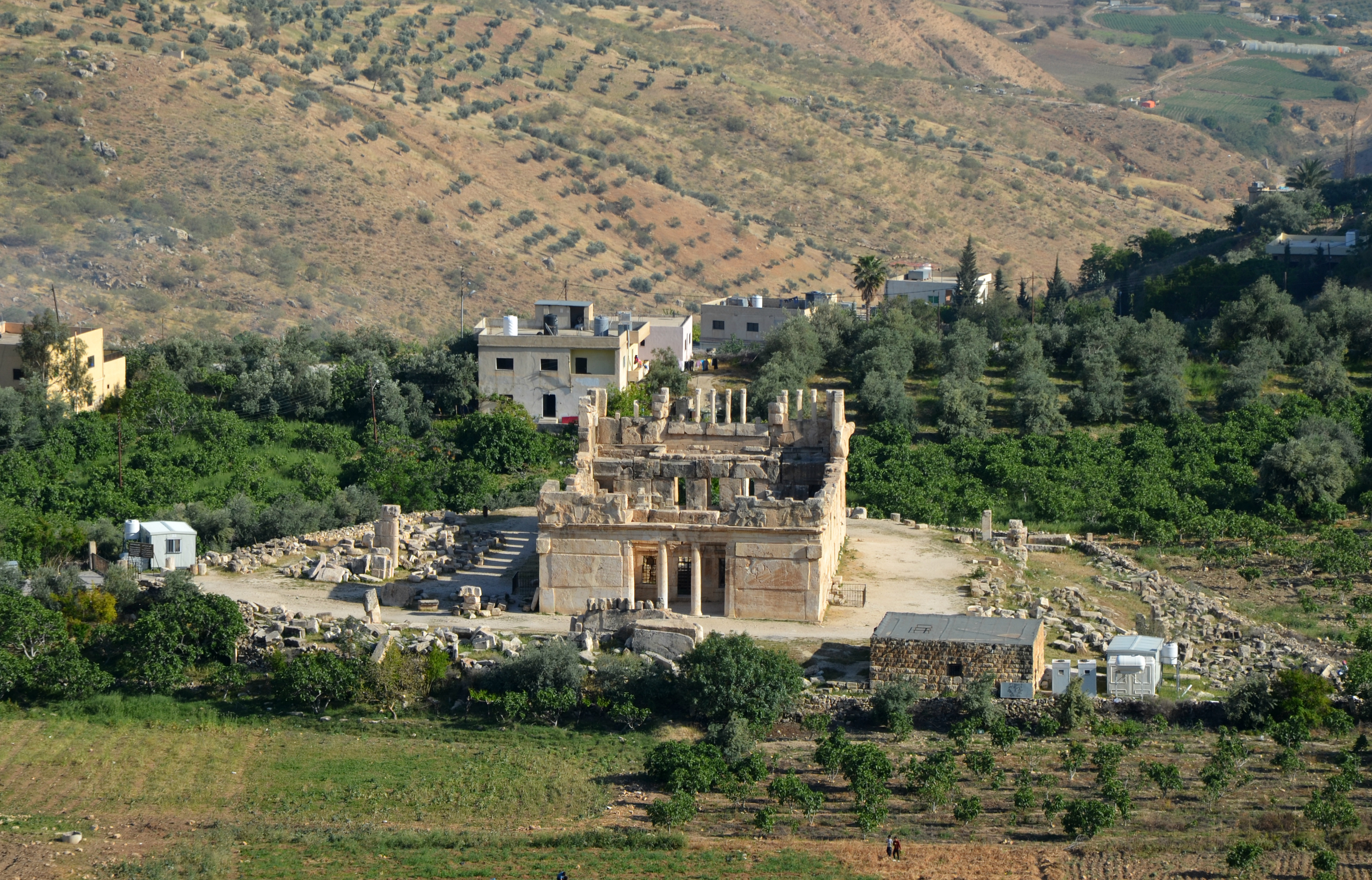
- View of Qasr al-Abd

- Location within Jordan

General information
- Architectural style: Hellenistic
- Location: Iraq al-Amir, Jordan
- Coordinates: 31.9128°N 35.7518°E
- Completed: first quarter of the second century BCE (200-175 BCE)

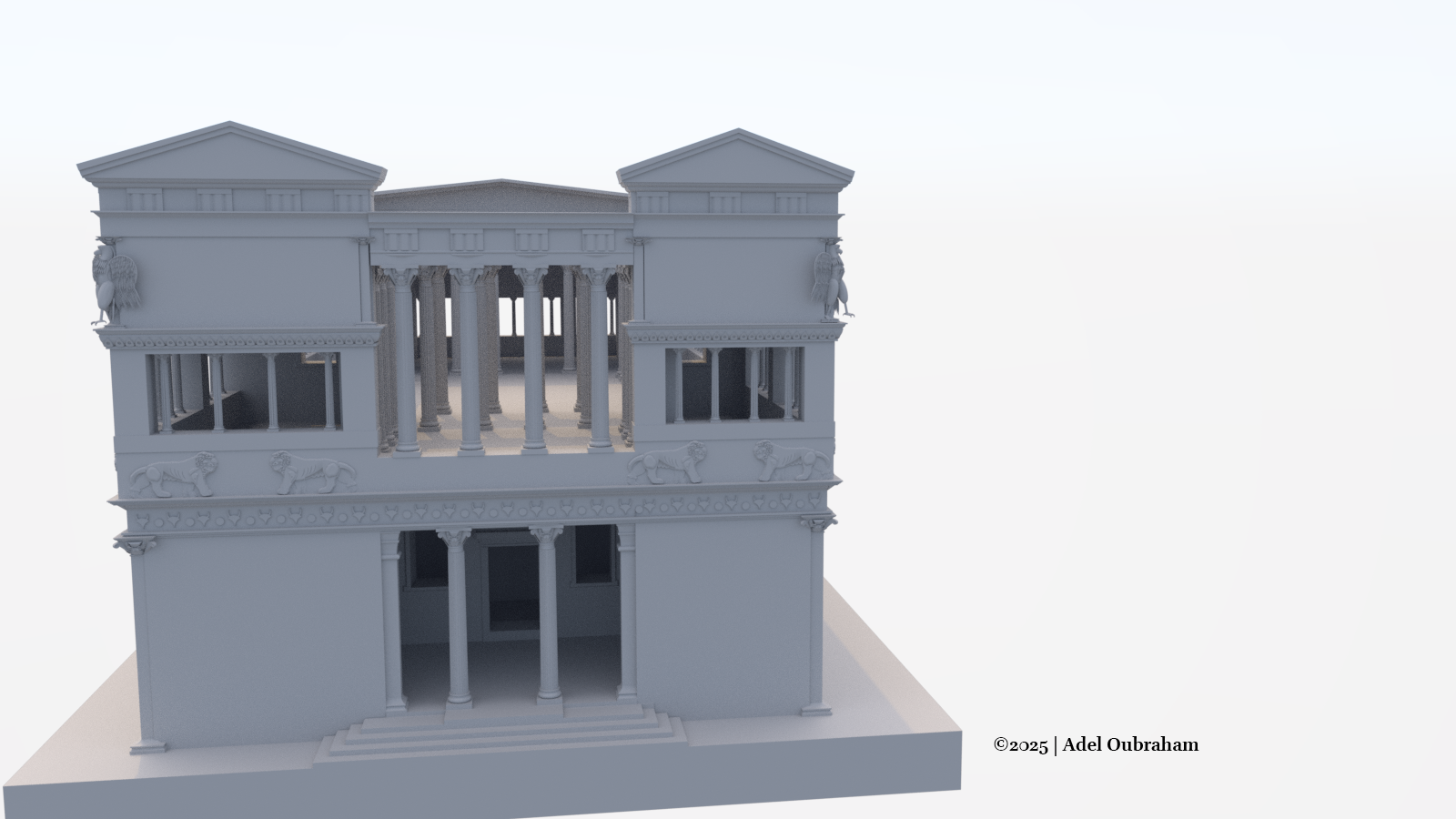
Qasr Al Abd 3D Model (south view)

Qasr al-Abd (Arabic: قصر العبد, lit. 'Castle of the servant') is a large Hellenistic palace from the first quarter of the second century BCE. Most scholars agree it was built by the Tobiads, a notable Jewish family of the Second Temple period, although the descriptions doesn't mention that. Its ruins stand in modern-day Jordan in the valley of Wadi Seer, close to the village of Iraq al-Amir, approximately 17 kilometers west of Amman.

== History ==
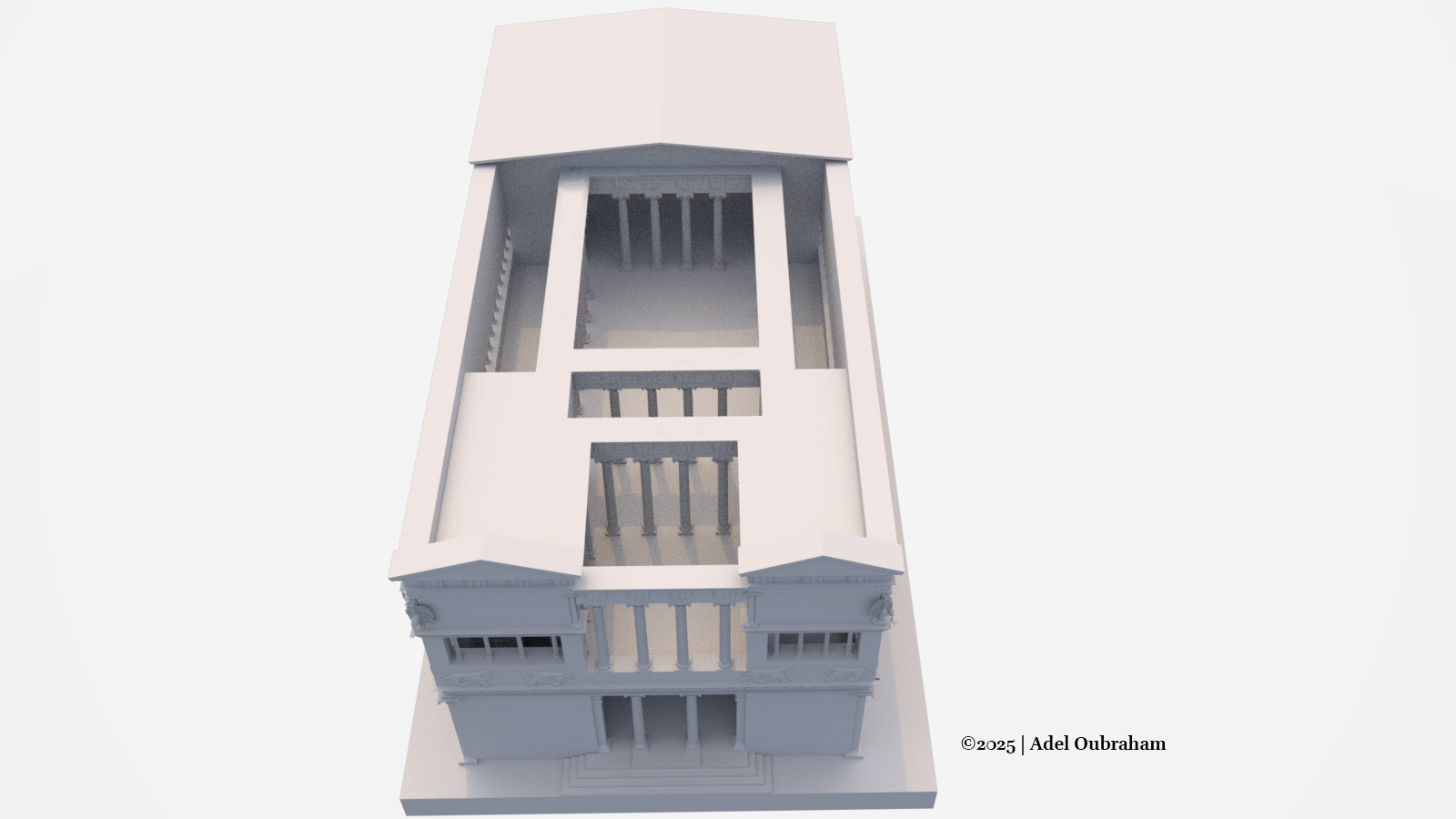
Qasr Al Abd 3D Model (upper view)

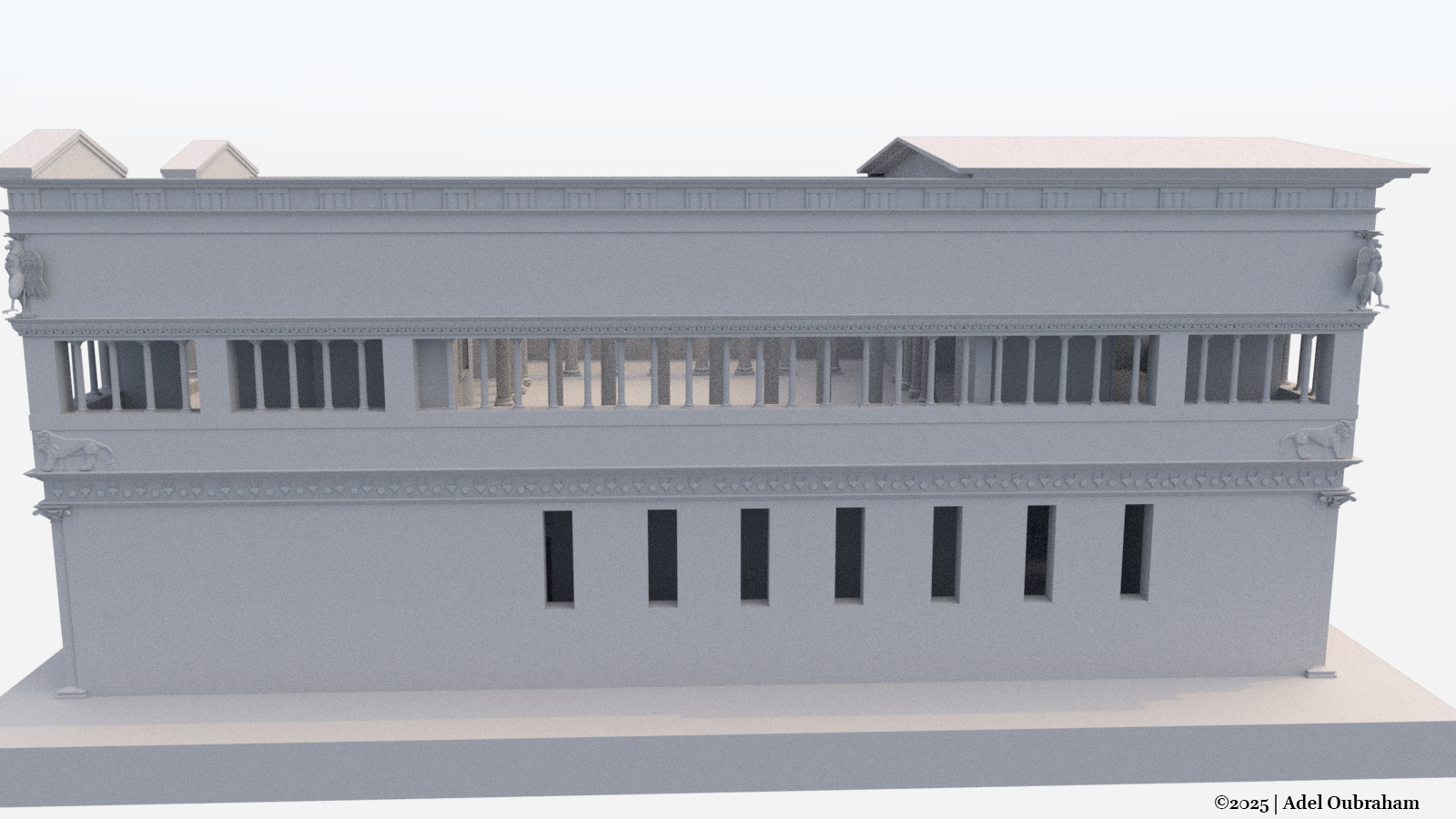
Qasr Al Abd 3D Model (east view)

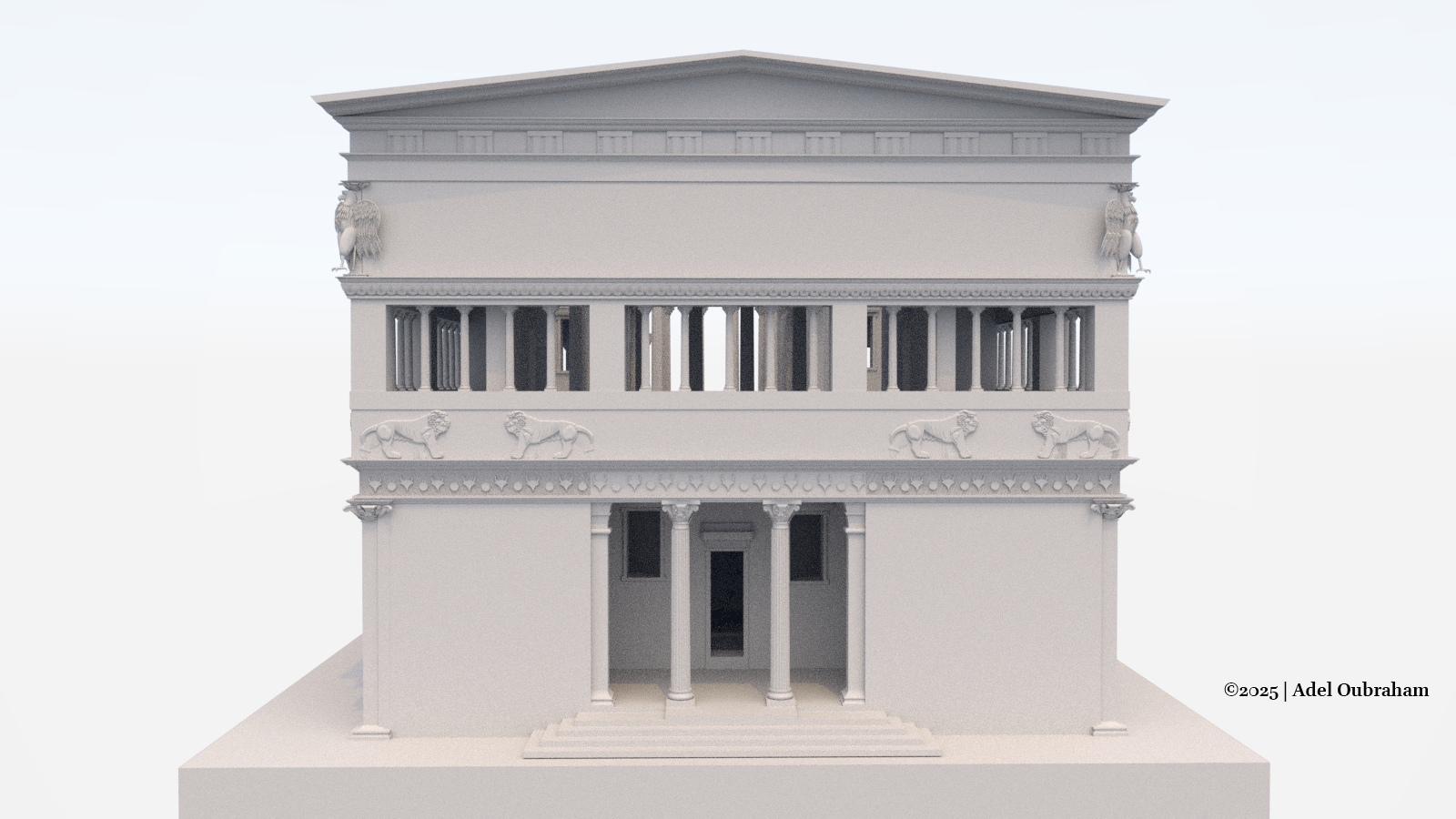
Qasr Al Abd 3D Model (north view)

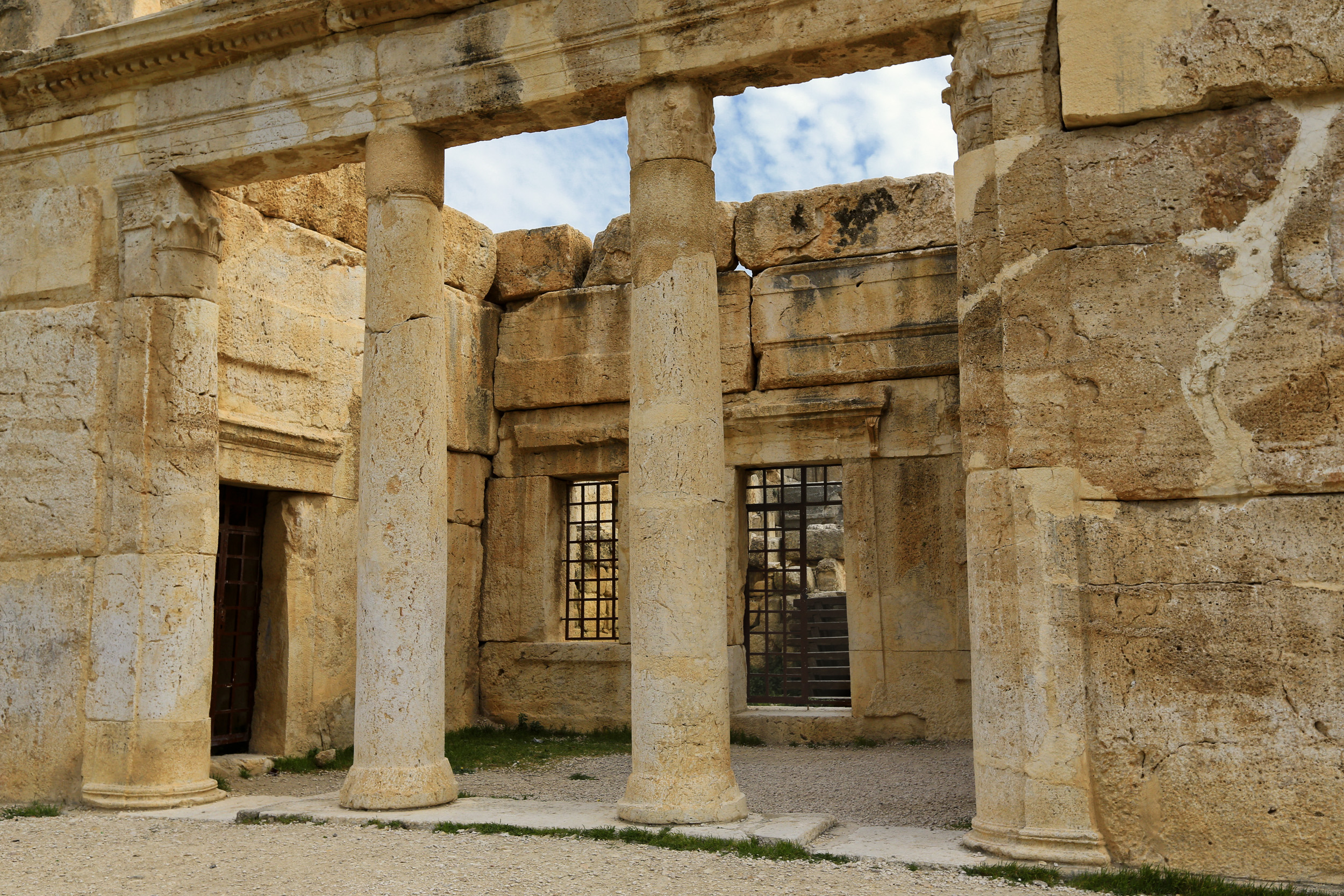
Front entrance

Qasr al-Abd is believed to be Tyros, the palace of a Tobiad notable, Hyrcanus of Jerusalem, head of the powerful Tobiad family and governor of Ammon in the 2nd century BCE. The first known written description of the castle comes down to us from Josephus, a first-century Jewish-Roman historian:

He also erected a strong castle, and built it entirely of white stone to the very roof, and had animals of a prodigious magnitude engraved upon it. He also drew round it a great and deep canal of water. He also made caves of many furlongs in length, by hollowing a rock that was over against him; and then he made large rooms in it, some for feasting, and some for sleeping and living in. He introduced also a vast quantity of waters which ran along it, and which were very delightful and ornamental in the court. But still he made the entrances at the mouth of the caves so narrow, that no more than one person could enter by them at once. And the reason why he built them after that manner was a good one; it was for his own preservation, lest he should be besieged by his brethren, and run the hazard of being caught by them. Moreover, he built courts of greater magnitude than ordinary, which he adorned with vastly large gardens. And when he had brought the place to this state, he named it Tyre. This place is between Arabia and Judea, beyond Jordan, not far from the country of Heshbon.

— Flavius Josephus, Antiquities of the Jews, translated by William Whiston, Book XII, Chapter IV, 11.

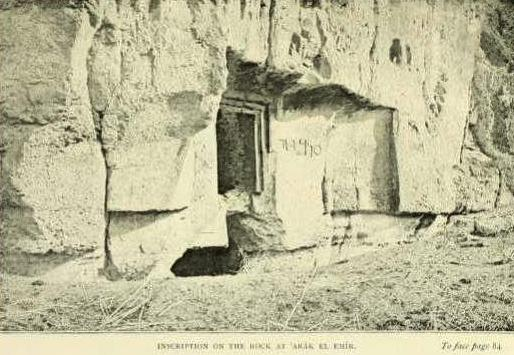
A photo of the "Tobiah" cave (#13) with the Hebrew inscription, taken by the British explorer Claude Conder

The association of the site with the Tobiads is based on a cave inscription found nearby. The Hebrew name 'Tuvya' or 'Toviyya' (Tobias) is engraved (טוביה, but in a more Aramaic script above the adjacent burial caves of Iraq al-Amir, which share their name with the nearby village. In another of these caves there is a carving of a lioness sheltering a cub at the palace. There are two inscriptions in Aramaic script reading "Tobiah", carved into the facades of two rock-cut halls north of the palace and dated to the 4th century BCE or earlier.

According to Josephus, Hyrcanus left Jerusalem after losing a power struggle, and established his residence east of the Jordan, apparently on the ancestral lands of the Tobiad dynasty. The area was then a border zone between Judea and Arabia and Josephus mentions that Hyrcanus was in constant skirmishes with Arabians, killing and capturing many. Hyrcanus took his own life in 175 BCE, following the ascent to power in Syria of the strongly anti-Jewish Seleucid king Antiochus Epiphanes, fearing the latter's revenge for his support for the Egypt-based Ptolemaics against the Syrian Seleucids. The building was unfinished at the time of his death (as indicated by several incomplete carvings and columns on site), and was seized by Antiochus Epiphanes.

The name Qasr al-Abd can be translated as "Castle of the Slave" or "Castle of the Servant", a title which may refer to Hyrcanus himself, who, as governor, was a "servant of the king". The biblical Book of Nehemiah mentions "Toviyya, the Servant, the Ammonite" (Neh. 2:10); the Hebrew word used, "ebed" or "eved", is translated here as "official", but more generally means "slave" or "servant"). According to a local Arab legend, Tobias was a commoner who fell in love with the daughter of a nobleman. When he asked for her hand in marriage, the nobleman said that Tobias could only have her hand if he built the so-called "Castle of the Slave." After completing the castle, the nobleman had Tobias killed as he did not want his daughter marrying a commoner.

The palace was badly damaged by the 363 Galilee earthquake. It preserved its original two stories due to the fact that was reused as a church during the Byzantine period.

== Architecture ==
The heavily decorated two-storey stone structure (measuring about 40 metres by 20 metres, and 13 metres high) is a rare example of Hellenistic architecture in Jordan.

The structure was originally surrounded by a large excavated reflecting pool, leading Josephus to assume that this was a moat and the building a fortress. However, more recent evidence for the building's original function being as a country pleasure palace has been presented by the Israeli archaeologist Ehud Netzer. It has also been suggested that the site was in fact intended to serve as a mausoleum of the Tobiads. In any case, it was never completed.

Josephus mentions the "beasts of gigantic size carved on it" (Antiquities of the Jews, Book XII, 230), and carved tigers or lions are still perfectly preserved on the remains visible today.

The castle is built from some of the largest single blocks of any building in the Middle East, with the largest block measuring seven by three metres. However, these blocks were at most only 40 centimetres wide, making the building relatively vulnerable to the earthquake which eventually destroyed it.

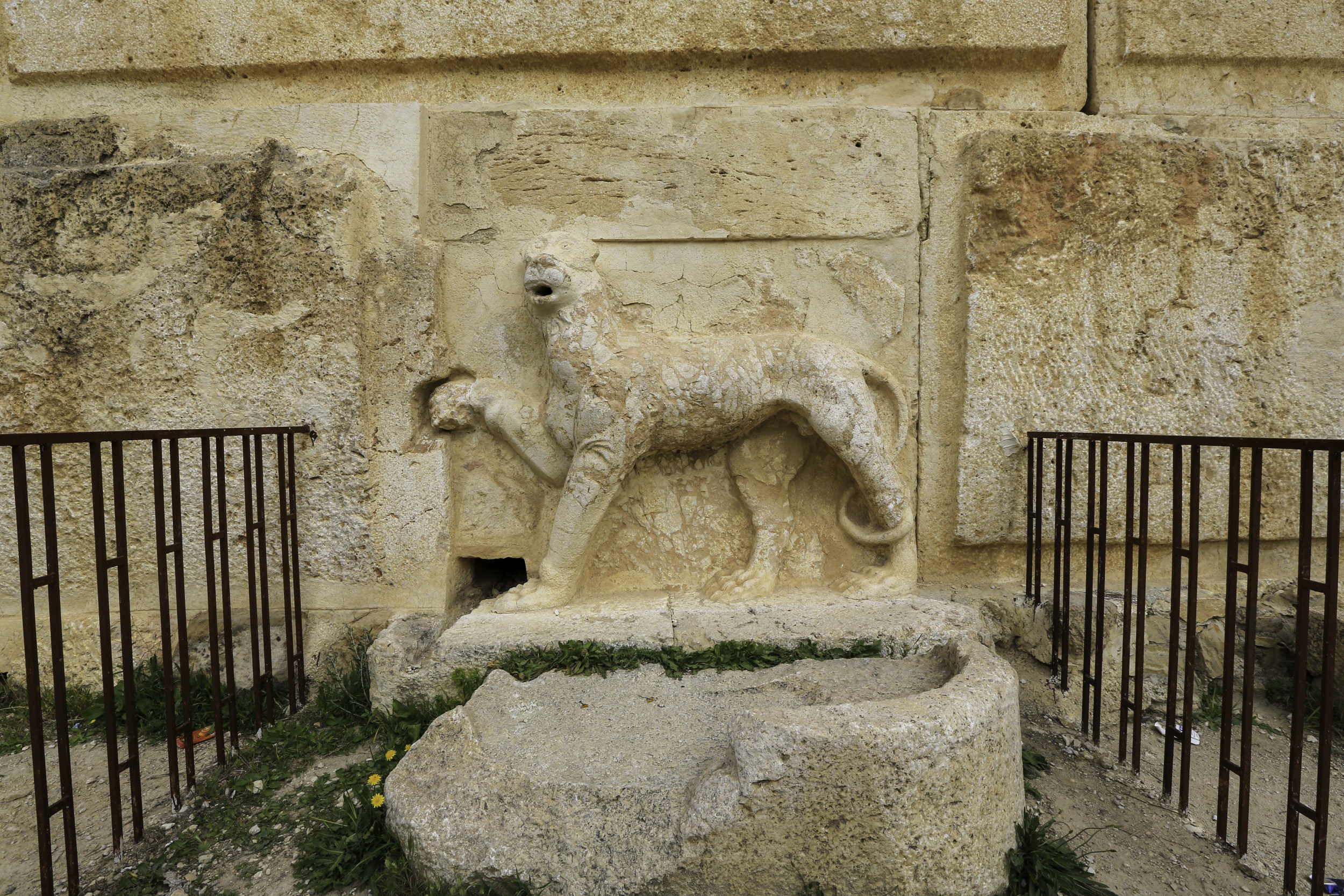
Carved lion

Archaeologists have established that Qasr al-Abd once stood in a much larger estate, which was originally surrounded by a wall and included a park with trees and shrubs. A large stone olive press has been found on the site, suggesting the estate was partially self-sufficient in agricultural produce. Much of the estate now stands beneath the village of Iraq al-Amir.

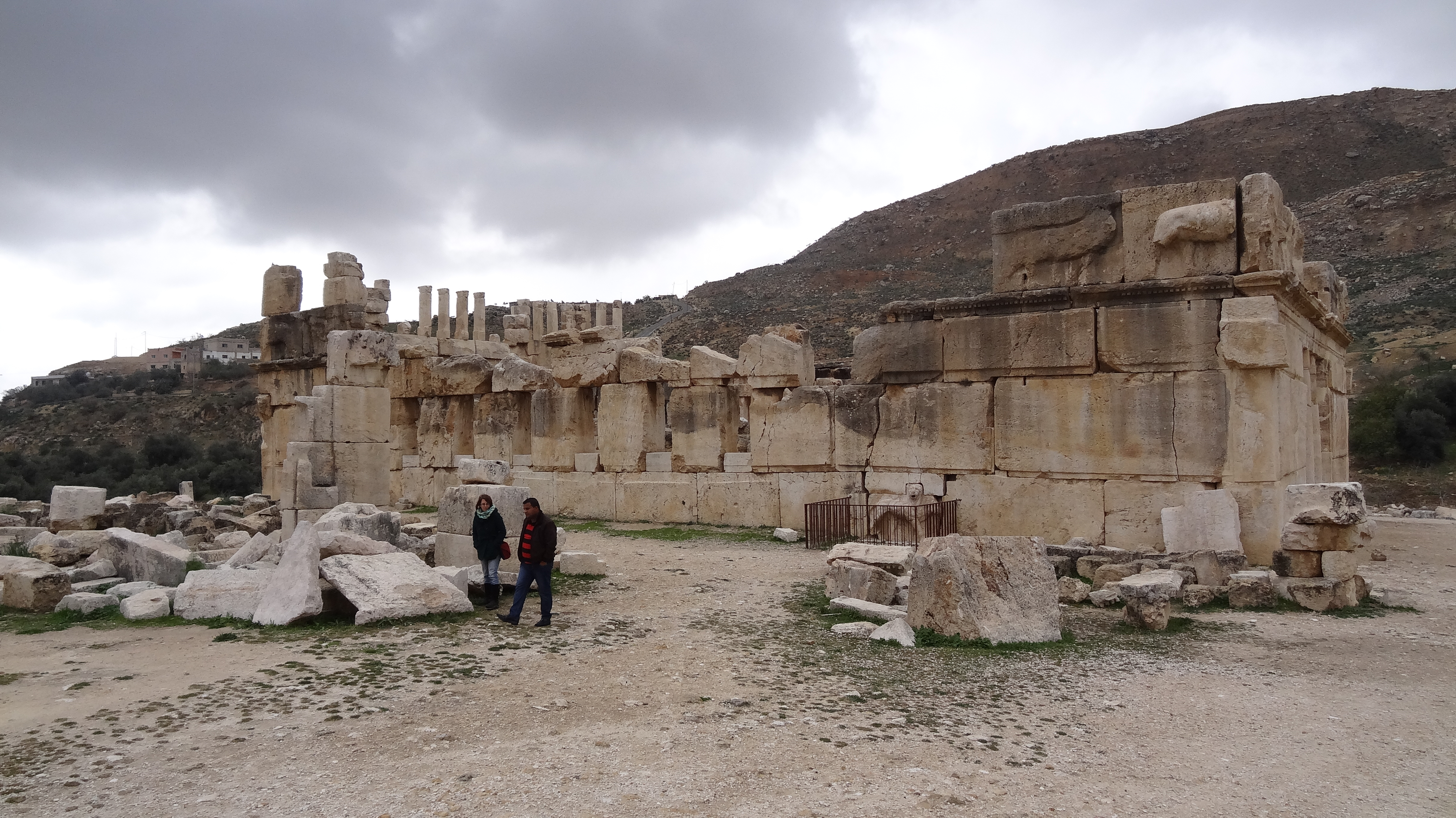
Side view

== Restoration ==
The ruins of Qasr al-Abd have been partially restored, due to the efforts of a French team directed by Ernest Will and the architect François Larché in collaboration with Fawzi Zayadine of the Jordanian Department of Antiquities. The team spent the years 1979 to 1985 making detailed drawings of the fallen stones and on the subsequent reconstruction.

In 2018, the site was renovated with pathways and signs to make it more "tourist friendly".
