= Zenon of Kaunos =

Ancient Greek public official and scribe

Zenon of Kaunos Ζήνων
- Financial private secretary and scribe
- Dynasty: Ptolemaic dynasty
- Born: Kaunos, Asia Minor (modern-day Dalyan, Muğla, Turkey)
- Father: Agreophon

Zenon or Zeno (Greek: Ζήνων; 3rd century BCE), son of Agreophon, was a public official in Ptolemaic Egypt around the 250s–230s BCE. He is known from a cache of his papyrus documents which was discovered by archaeologists in the Nile Valley in 1914.

== Biography ==
Zeno was a native of the Greek town of Kaunos in Caria in southwestern Asia Minor. He moved to the town of Philadelphia in Egypt, a busy market town that had been founded on the edge of the Faiyum by Ptolemy II Philadelphus in honour of his sister Arsinoe II. From the 3rd century BCE until the 5th century CE, Philadelphia was a thriving settlement that relied on agriculture for its economic success. At Philadelphia, Zeno became a private secretary to Apollonius, the finance minister to Ptolemy II Philadelphus and Ptolemy III Euergetes.

Drimylus and Dionysius, two Greek employees under Zeno, were reported to him for selling women as sex-slaves.

== The Zenon Papyri ==
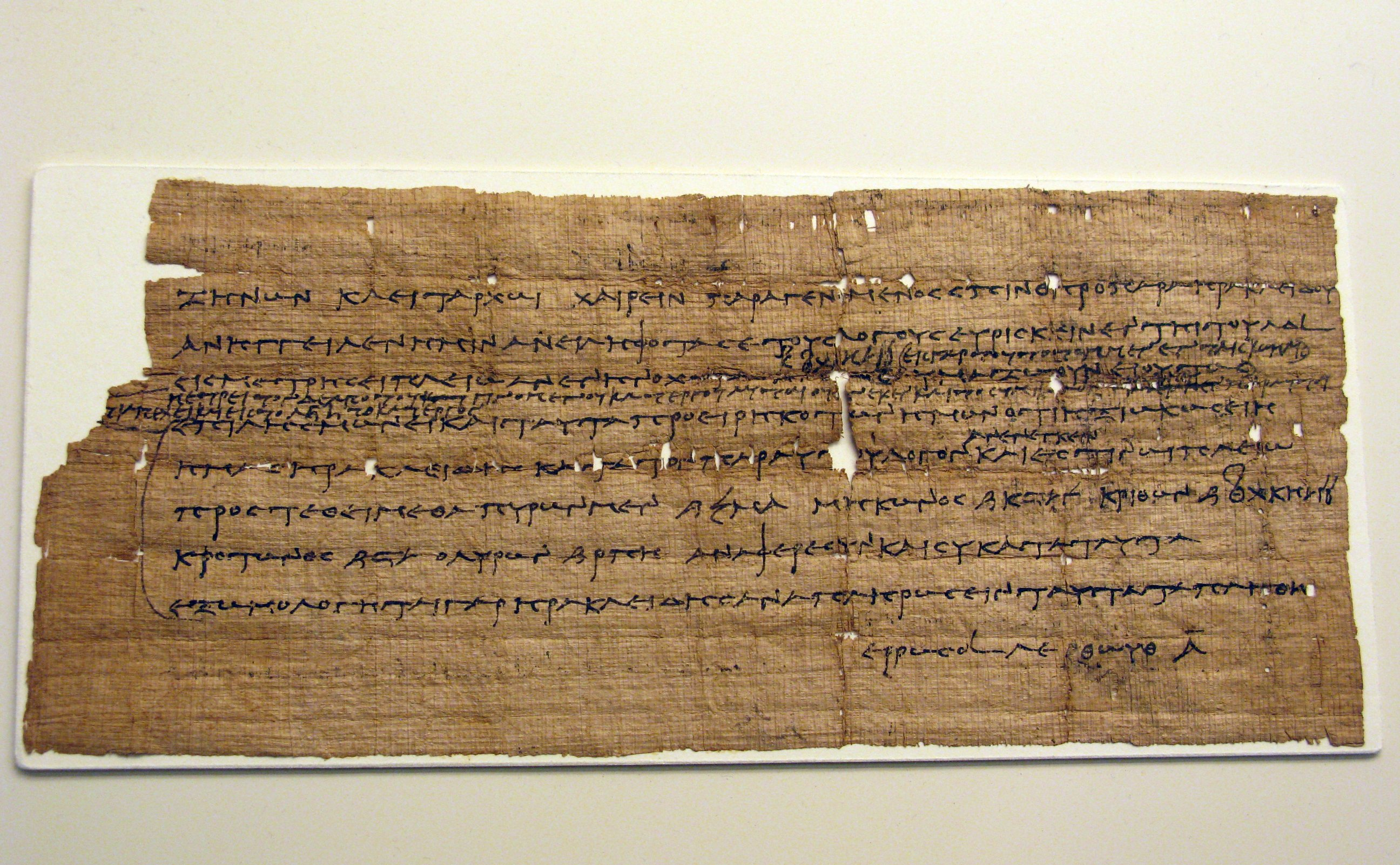
Part of a letter discussing tax issues from the Zenon Archive, written in Greek on papyrus (3rd century BRPB, National Archaeological Museum, Athens)

During the winter of 1914–1915, Egyptian peasants were digging near the modern settlement of Kom el-Kharaba for sebakh (decayed mudbricks that were often plundered from ancient sites as they could be used as fertiliser). There they uncovered a cache of over 2,000 papyrus documents. Upon examination by Egyptologists, they were found to be records written by Zeno in Greek and Demotic, and the site (whose precise location is now unknown) was identified as the location of the ancient town of Philadelphia. Most of the papyri, now referred to as the Zenon Archive or the Zenon Papyri, were edited and published by the British papyrologists Campbell Cowan Edgar and Arthur Surridge Hunt.

The Zenon Archive has since been divided among several museum collections and academic institutions around the world, and papyri are now held in the collections of the University of Michigan, Columbia University, the Società Italiana per la Ricerca dei Papiri Greci e Latini in Egitto, the British Museum in London and the Egyptian Museum in Cairo. A substantial part of the Zenon Papyri are now online and grammatically tagged at the Perseus Project hosted at Tufts University.

Between 258–259 BCE, Zeno stayed in Palestine together with other officials, and the papyri provide information about economic activity in Egypt and Palestine during this period. Among the places mentioned in the letters were the cities of Gaza, Afek, Acre, Kadesh, and Tyre.

According to the papyri, Zeno traveled throughout the administrative unit called "Syria and Phoenicia". He began his journey at Straton's Tower (Caesarea), where his ship docked. He then traveled to Jerusalem via Pegae near the Rosh Ha'ayin springs, and from there to Jericho, where large irrigation works were being built at that time. He then crossed over to the Jordan and visited "Abel," which was an area of vineyards, and continued to the Land of Tuvia, then ascended north and reached "Laxa," which was located south of Damascus. He continued his journey south to "Neveh" and "Ita," which was located on the banks of the Yarmuk, from where he continued to "Beit Anat," where Apollonius had a large estate. Zeno then reached Kedesh, which is located southeast of Beit Anat. His last stop was Acre, which was then called Ptolemais, where he boarded a ship back to Egypt.

Apollonius to Zenon, greeting.

You did right to send the chickpeas to Memphis. Farewell.

Year 30, Loius 14, Mesore 14.

The papyri also contain a list of goods exported from the Land of Palestine, including grain, oil, asphalt from the Dead Sea region, and persimmons. One letter details a shipment of slaves, eunuchs, and rare animals he sent to Egypt. The slaves were young boys and girls who were purchased and intended to serve in the homes of wealthy Egyptians. Five letters written by Zeno in February–March 258 BCE, after his return from the Levant to Egypt, deal with the capture and return of boys who had been bought as slaves in Idumea and had escaped. A letter from Philotas, one of Apollonius' agents, reports to Zeno about the escape of slaves from the port of Gaza. In several papyri, Zeno recounts the conduct of local rulers who dared to oppose the king's officials. Another letter is a report on two officials in his service, Dremilus and Dionysius, who turned to a sideline business of trafficking in women and selling them into prostitution.

The papyri also include mention of the Nabataeans who are in this time described as being present in the areas of southern Syria (Hauran) and the Transjordan (Auranitis).
