= Campbell Cowan Edgar =

British Egyptologist (1870–1938)

- Born: 26 December 1870; Tongland, Kirkcudbrightshire, Scotland
- Died: 10 May 1936 (aged 65); Berkhamsted, Hertfordshire, England
- Resting place: Rectory Lane Cemetery, Berkhamsted; 51.75686°N 0.56199°W
- Education: Glasgow University, Oriel College, Oxford the British School at Athens
- Known for: Translation of the Zenon Papyri
- Spouse: Jessie Florence Robertson Edgar
- Scientific career
- Fields: Archaeology, Egyptology and papyrology
- Workplaces: The Egyptian Museum, Cairo

Campbell Cowan Edgar (26 December 1870–10 May 1938) was a Scottish Egyptologist, classical archaeologist and papyrologist. He is especially noted for his work with A. S. Hunt on translating the Zenon Papyri. Between 1925 and 1927 he served as the Keeper of the Egyptian Museum at Cairo.

== Early life ==
Edgar was in Tongland, Kirkcudbrightshire, in south-west Scotland. His parents were Mary Sybilla Edgar (née Cowan, 1845–1928) and Rev Andrew Edgar (1830–1890), a Church of Scotland minister. They had nine children, among them Charles Samuel Edgar (1874–1945), Campbell's younger brother, who later became Professor of Greek at Stellenbosch University in South Africa. The family later moved to Mauchline in Ayrshire, where Campbell's father served as minister of Mauchline Parish Church.

== Education ==
The young Campbell was educated at Ayr Academy, before going on to study at Glasgow University 1887–91 under noted classical scholars Richard Claverhouse Jebb and Gilbert Murray. After graduating from Glasgow, Edgar studied classical archaeology at Oriel College, Oxford 1891–95. As a gifted student, he was awarded the Craven Fellowship in 1896 and went to continue his education in Greece at the British School at Athens, where he studied under Cecil Harcourt Smith.

== Career ==
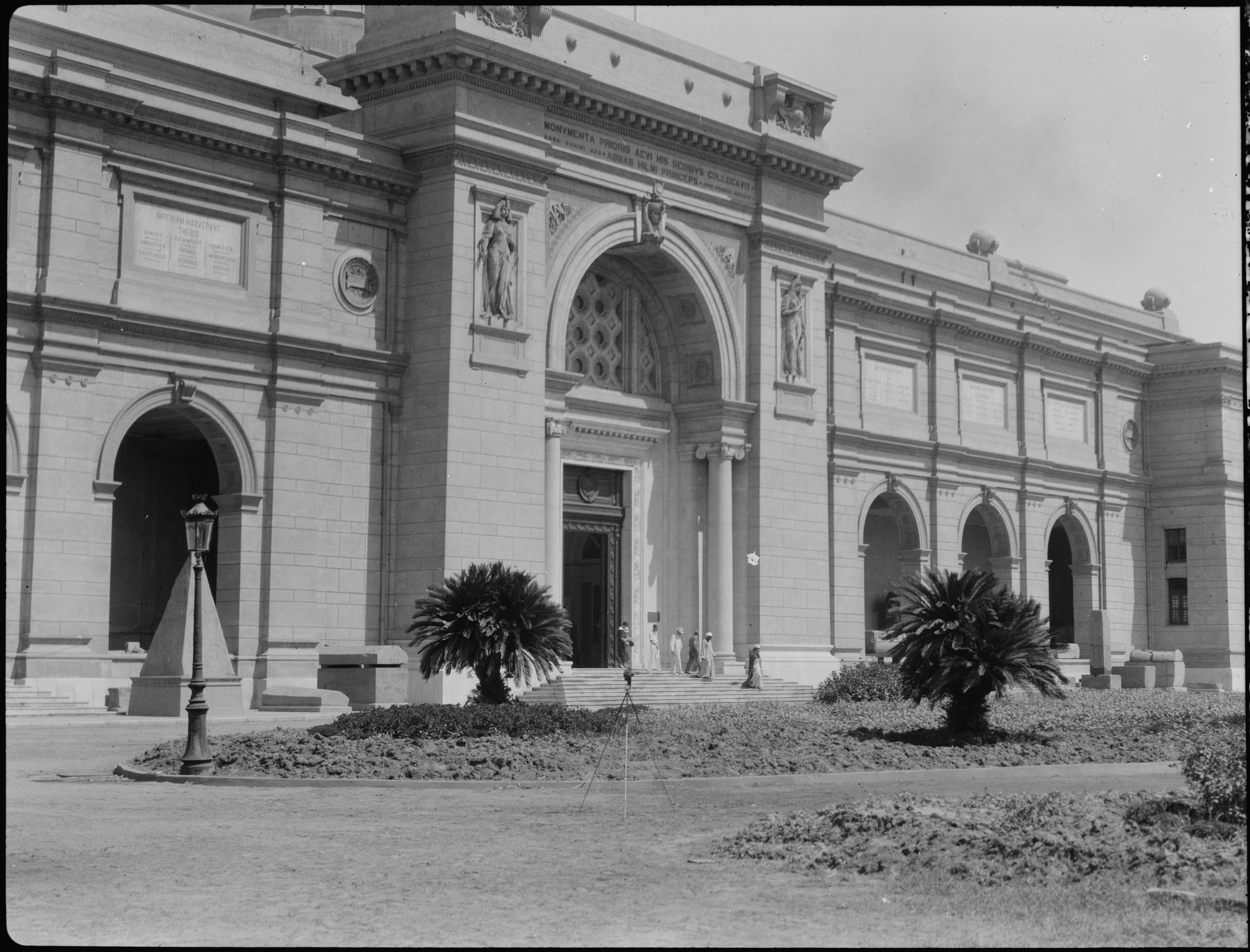
C.C. Edgar was put in charge of the Egyptian Museum at Cairo

Among C.C. Edgar's early archaeological expeditions was an investigation of the temple at Kynosarges near Athens in 1896–1897, and excavations of the prehistoric Cycladic burials at Pelos on the island of Milos in the Cyclades.

Already a scholar of Classical Greece, C.C. Edgar began to specialise in the study of Hellenistic Egypt. In 1900 the Egyptian Government appointed him to work on the Catalogue général des antiquités égyptiennes du Musée du Caire of the Cairo Museum, and Edgar learned to read Egyptian hieroglyphics. Edgar's career in Egypt advanced, and in 1905 was appointed chief inspector of antiquities in the Nile Delta. Edgar took part in some important archaeological digs, including assisting David George Hogarth at the ancient city of Naukratis in 1903, and excavating the Tomb of Khesuwer at Kom el-Hisn in 1910.

In 1914, a hoard of ancient papyrus documents known as the Zenon Papyri was discovered in the Nile Valley, a cache of financial and legal records from the lost ancient city of Philadelphia. Together with fellow papyrologist Arthur Surridge Hunt, Edgar translated the documents from the original Greek and Demotic.

In 1925, C.C. Edgar was appointed keeper and secretary-general of the Cairo Museum. He retired in 1927 and returned to Britain.

== Death and legacy ==
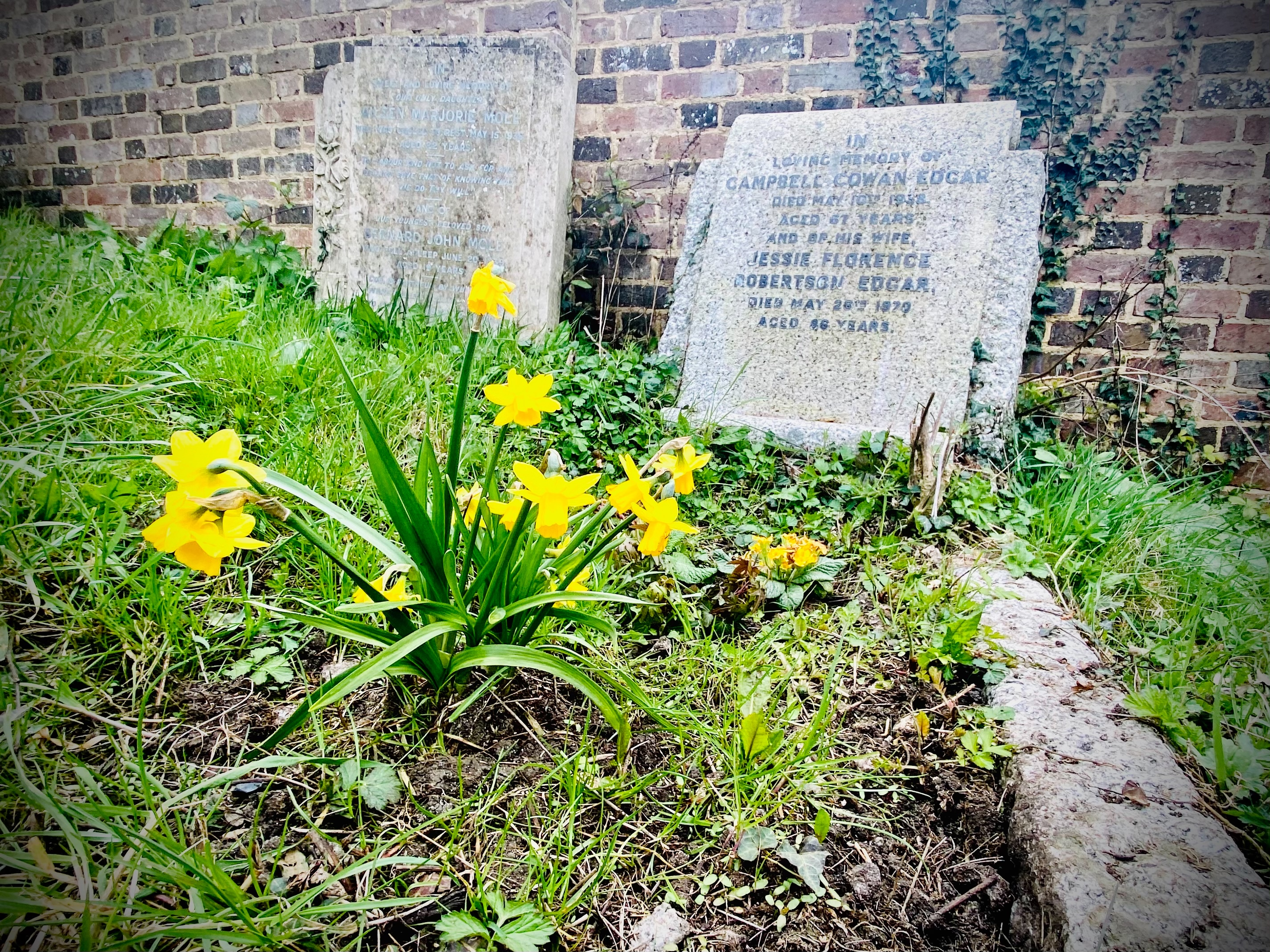
The grave of C. C. Edgar in Berkhamsted

Campbell Cowan Edgar died in Berkhamsted in Hertfordshire, England. He was buried in Rectory Lane Cemetery, the burial ground of the Church of St Peter, Great Berkhamsted and his grave is marked with a headstone carved in the shape of a papyrus scroll. His wife, Jessie Robertson Smith, outlived him by 32 years and was buried with him when she died in 1970.

C.C. Edgar is still cited today by Egyptology scholars. Edgar donated a number of his archaeological finds to the collection of the British Museum in London, including Cycladic and Minoan artefacts, and items from Naukratis.
