= Timothy (Seleucid commander) =

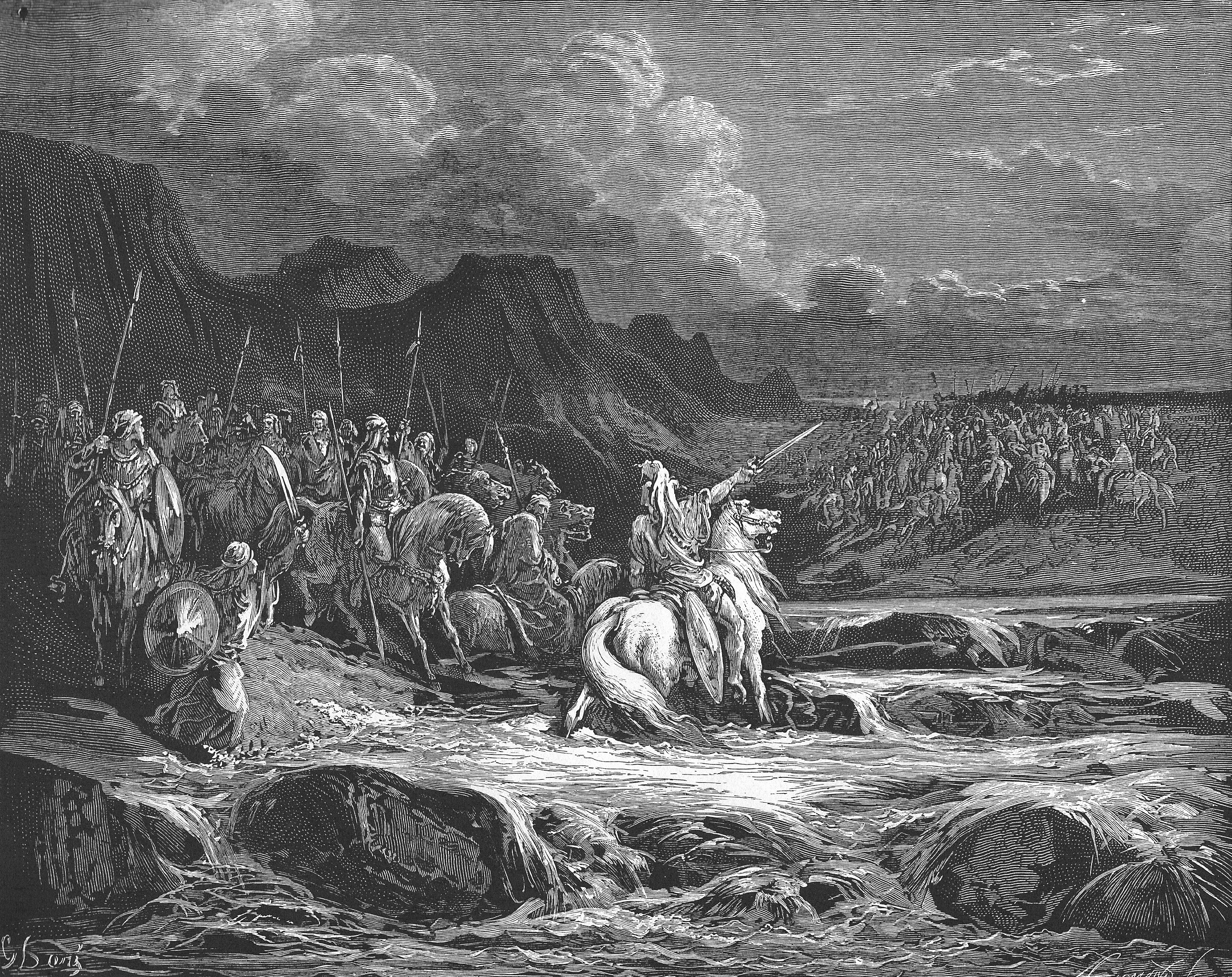
Judas Maccabeus Pursues Timotheus (1 Macc 5:28-44)

Timothy (Greek: Τιμόθεος Timótheos) was a military commander of the Seleucid Empire, active during the mid 2nd century BCE and probably a governor in the land of Ammon and Gilead. He fought during the Maccabee campaigns of 163 BC against the local Jews, and later the Maccabee rebel army directly. He was eventually defeated by Judas Maccabeus (Judah Maccabee) at Dathema in Gilead.

== Primary sources ==
No Greek records of Timothy remain, so all that is known of him are hostile accounts from the Jewish books of 1 Maccabees and 2 Maccabees. He appears briefly in Josephus's book Jewish Antiquities, but the work does not add any details on him not already in 1 Maccabees. According to these sources, Timothy hired mercenaries, both Arabian and Asian horsemen, and used those forces in a local struggle with the Jews of Ammon and Gilead. Judas Maccabeus's intervention drove him off and saved the besieged Jews, and according to 2 Maccabees, Timothy died, although the timing of when and how is somewhat unclear due to 2 Maccabees seemingly describing the events out-of-order. As an additional complication, a Seleucid commander named Timothy is described in 2 Maccabees 8, 2 Maccabees 10 (which describes Timothy's death), and 2 Maccabees 12, but it is disputed whether it is the same Timothy being referred to, or else separate people named Timothy, which would allow the account in Chapter 12 to come chronologically after the death of Timothy in Chapter 10.

== Analysis ==
Most scholars accept that 1 Maccabees Chapter 5 and 2 Maccabees Chapter 12 are describing the same rough struggle; they both mention a struggle at Carnaim and include many similar locations. Bezalel Bar-Kochva additionally argues that both 2 Maccabees Chapter 8 and 10 are also referring to the same campaign. In Chapter 8, the inclusion of the incident appears to be "associative writing" as both the Battle of Emmaus described earlier in the chapter, and the clash with Timothy, stress the noble behavior of the Jewish army: they stop plundering and divide the spoils equally between widows, orphans, and the wounded, hence being relevant to insert into the narrative. Chapter 8 also mentions the mention of a death of a phylarch (literally "tribal commander"), which Bar-Kochva argues was likely an Arab sheikh of a tribe allied with Timothy as described in 1 Maccabees 5. While a direct reading of 2 Maccabees 10 suggests it is referring to a separate invasion of Judea, it is often argued that "Gezer" (in western Judea) was a distorted memory or translation of "Jazer" (in Ammon), and someone who did not recognize Jazer accidentally moved the incident to Gezer in the 2 Maccabees version. Bar-Kochva notes that the Egyptian epitomist of 2 Maccabees does not appear very familiar with the geography of Coele-Syria, rendering such a mistake plausible. He further argues that there was just one Timothy, and that Jason of Cyrene's lost history probably described the fates of enemy commanders in some detail, hence a list of Timothy's brothers being included; that would mean that the account of Timothy's death in Chapter 10 likely was reliable and originated from Jason's history, even if the moralistic slant where it was explained as a belated punishment for blasphemy might have been the epitomist's addition.

John D. Grainger is suspicious of the veracity of the accounts in the surviving sources, believing they probably exaggerated the Hasmonean's success. He argues that it seems more likely the Maccabee attacks were not particularly successful, Timothy successfully blocked the attack and defended Ammon (given the later retreat), and the Maccabees fell back with little more results than a looting expedition.
