= Iraq al-Amir =

Archaeological site in Jordan

`Iraq al Amir
- Location in Jordan
- Coordinates: 31°55′N 35°45′E
- Country: Jordan
- Governorate: Amman Governorate
- Time zone: UTC + 2

'Iraq al-Amir or Araq el-Amir (Arabic:عراق الأمير - literally, "Caves of the Prince") is the name shared by a town and nearby caves, within the municipality of Amman in the Jordan Valley. Located about 15 km southwest of the town of Wadi as-Seer, it has a population of about 6000 people, mostly members of the Abbadi tribe. It is located on hills with high and medium altitude, in an area with many springs and famous for its olive trees and other forest trees.

There are many caves in the hills which were inhabited during the Copper Age. There are also remarkable Roman-Byzantine architectural remains. It is a large cave church – closed because of on-going excavations –, and a second church built outside right in front of it. The entrance of the cave can be identified by a façade decorated with a pediment with crosses. The site is called Mugharat al-Kaniseh (Cave of the Church) by the local community.

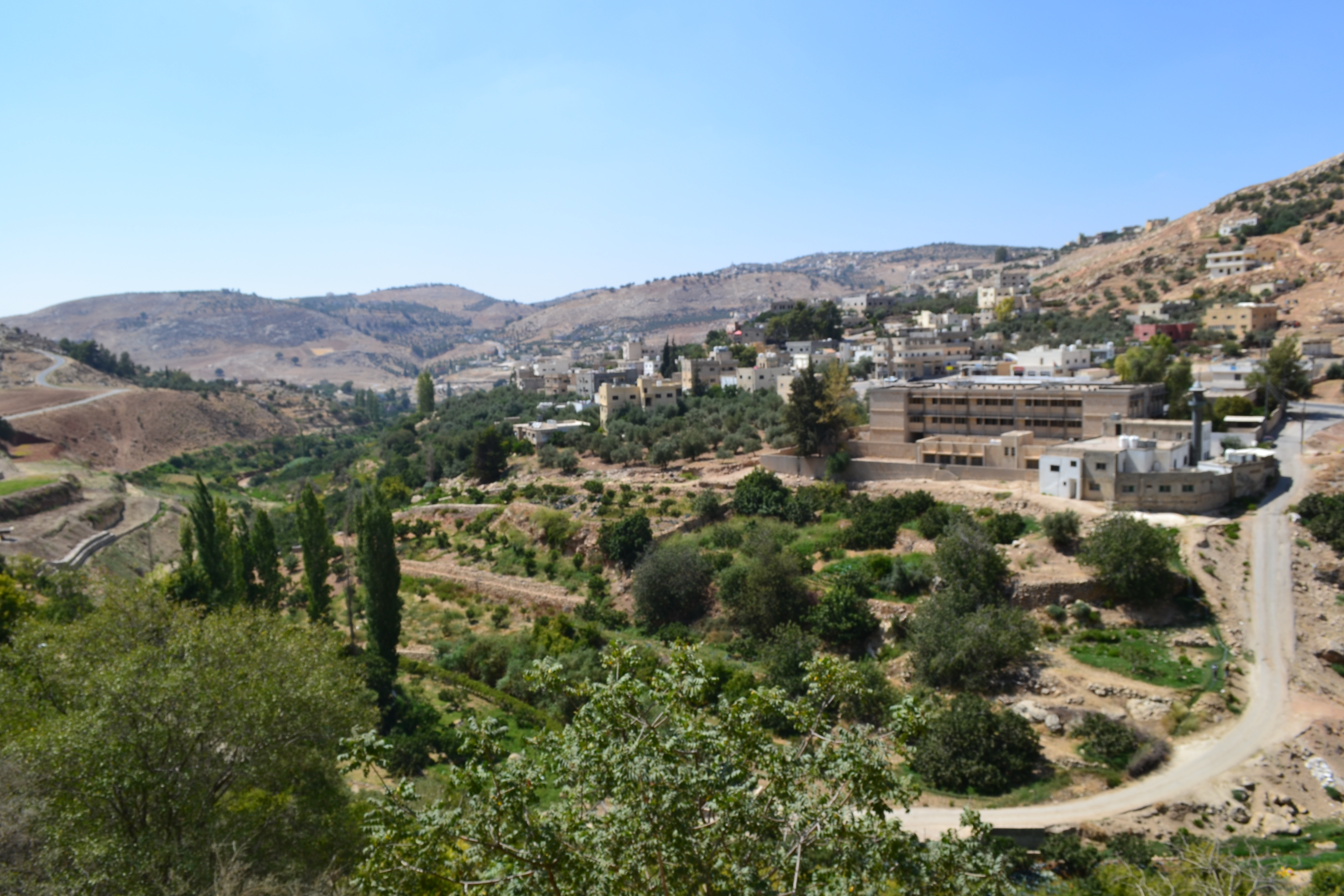
A view of the town

About 500 metres south of the town stands an archaeological site known as Al-Iraq, dominated by a partially restored Hellenistic period palace known as Qasr al-Abd, which is dated to the late 2nd century BCE. Most scholars agree that Qasr al-Abd was built by the Tobiads, a notable Jewish family of the Second Temple period. This identification is based on a Hebrew inscription found in a nearby burial cave that mentions the name "Tobiah".

Iraq Al-Amir is a stop on the Jordan Trail. It is a side trip of Region 3, Salt to Wadi Zarqa (84.4 km). It is 22.3 km from Salt or 15.2 km from Fuheis. From Iraq Al-Amir, the trail makes its way to Husban (19.5 km away).

== History of settlement ==
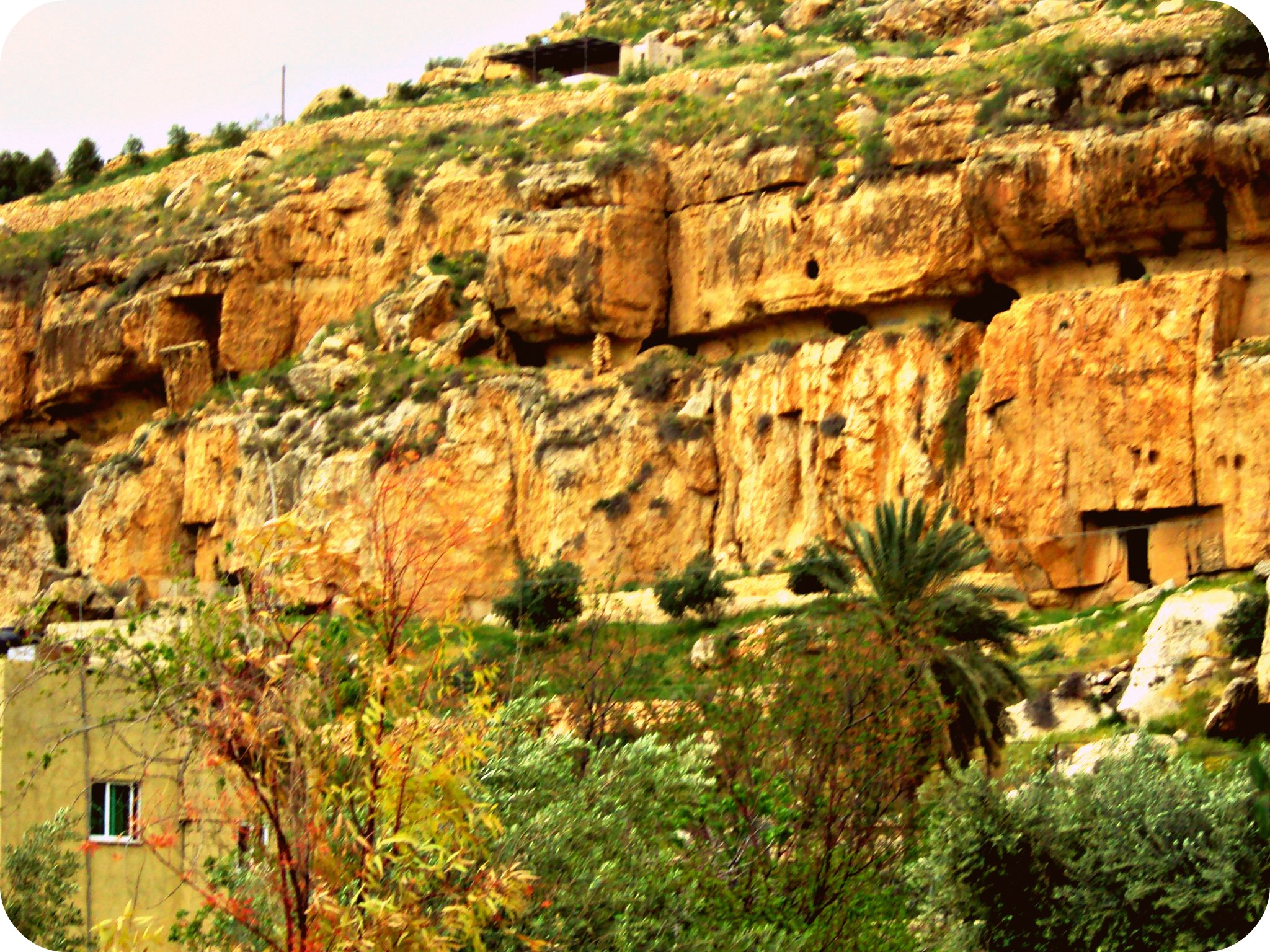
Ancient cave sites in Iraq al-Amir

The area was first settled in the Middle Stone Age (c. 20,000–10,000 PB). The caves dwellings continued to be used throughout the Bronze Age, as well as the first and second parts of the Iron Age.

Human presence continued in the site throughout the 5th and 4th centuries BCE, and reached its peak during the Hellenistic period, after Alexander the Great conquered the region in 332 BCE. The Seleucid king Ptolemy II Philadelphus built a town in that location, transferring population from Tyre, Phoenicia, so that during Hellenistic rule, Iraq al-Amir was known under the Greek name Tyros. The Tobiad palace of Qasr al-Abd was built in the same era.

The city particularly prospered in the Byzantine period. It was built around the 3rd century BCE, and reused under Byzantine rule before being destroyed by an earthquake. Pieces of Islamic pottery were also discovered at the site, specifically from the Umayyad and Mamluk times.

== Qasr al-Abd ==
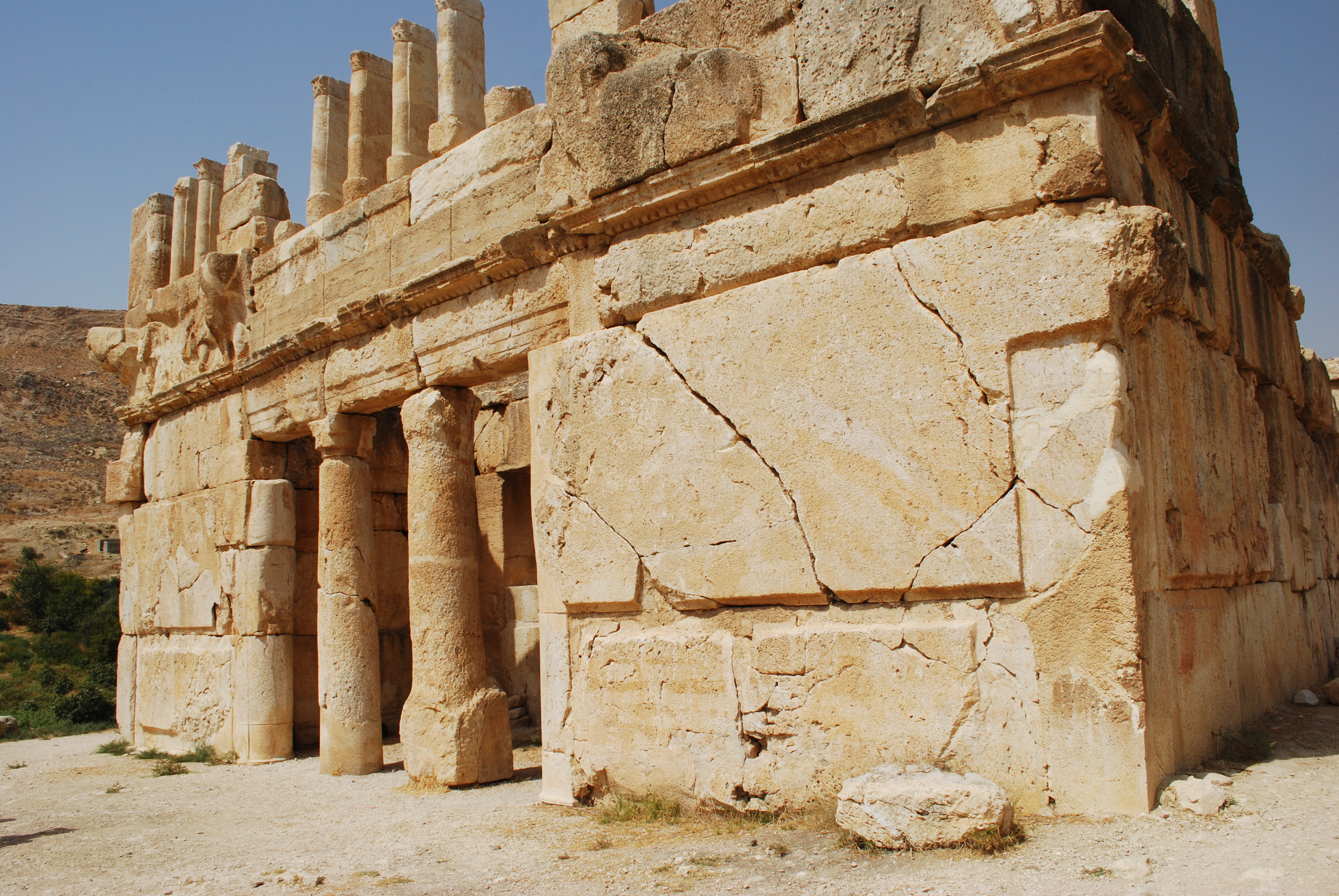
Ruins of Qasr al-Abd

One of the striking sights at Iraq al-Amir is the Qasr al-Abd palace (Arabic: قصر العبد, lit. 'Castle of the Slave'), considered as one of the most important Hellenistic remains in Jordan. The first known written description of the palace and its creation comes down to us from Flavius Josephus, a Jewish-Roman historian from the first century CE. The castle was used during the Hellenistic and Roman periods. The rectangular building was constructed from white limestone from the surrounding area and measures 18x37.5 metres, rising to about 14 metres. The walls are between 90 centimetres to 3.90 metres thick. Josephus maintained that it was surrounded by a moat and a protective wall.

The ground floor of the castle has a north and a south gate, as well as a north and south corridor. On the west side of both gates, there are four rooms. On the east side

there are steps leading to the second floor. On the north side there are water tanks and two lobbies. On the east side are seven windows for lighting and ventilation.

The upper floor has bedrooms and reception rooms. This part of the castle was unfinished, and was partly destroyed by an earthquake in the fourth century CE.

In the summer of 2018, Qasr al-Abd was renovated by the Jordanian Ministry of Tourism and Antiques. Several paved pathways were created around the structure and a building now houses a small theatre that plays an animation, narrated in Arabic and subtitled in French. The animation illustrates what is thought to be the original vision for the dwelling, a summer lodge, surrounded by water, to give the illusion of a boat floating in a sea.

== Women's Cooperative ==
Iraq Al-Amir is home to the Iraq Al-Amir Women's Cooperative. The Iraq Al-Amir Knowledge Station is located a short distance opposite the parking for the cave parking. It is next to the mosque. The cooperative involves women and girls from nearby Wadi Al Seer villages and produces hand-made paper, ceramics and clay pottery, as well as hand-woven fabrics. The fabric is crafted in a traditional manner, using a hand-weaving mill and three looms.

== See also ==
- Jordan Trail

== Bibliography ==
- Will, E. and Larché, F., 'Iraq al Amir, le Château du Tobiade Hyrcan. 2 vols (Paris: P. Geuthner, 1991) (BAH 132).
- Larché, F., 'Iraq al-Amir, le Château du Tobiade Hyrcan. Vol. II: Restitution et Reconstruction. 2 vols (Beirut: IFPO, 2005) (BAH 172).
- Rosenberg, Stephen Gabriel, Airaq al-Amir, The Architecture of the Tobiads (Oxford: Hadrian Books, 2006) (BAR International Series 1544).
- Rosenberg, Stephen, "Felicien de Saulcy and the Rediscovery of Tyros in Jordan", Palestine Exploration Quarterly, 138,1 (2006), 35-41.
- 'Iraq al-Amir, guide historique et archéologique du domaine des Tobiades. Beyrouth, Guides archéologiques de l'Ifpo, 2010.
