= Nimrud Letters =

The Nimrud Letters are an archive of 244 Neo-Assyrian and Neo-Babylonian cuneiform letters found at Nimrud in 1952 during the excavations led by Max Mallowan of the British School of Archaeology. The letters were published by H. W. F. Saggs.

The majority of the tablets were found in Room ZT 4, where ZT stands for Z[iggurat]T[errace].

105 tablets (99 Neo-Assyrian and 6 Neo-Babylonian) were first published between 1955 and 1974 in the journal Iraq (vols. 17–36), and the remaining 139 were published in 2001 in Saggs' book The Nimrud Letters, 1952.

== Bibliography ==
- Saggs, H. W. F. (1955). "The Nimrud Letters, 1952: Part I". Iraq. 17 (1): 21–56. doi:10.2307/4241715. JSTOR 4241715.
- Saggs, H. W. F. (1955). "The Nimrud Letters, 1952: Part II". Iraq. 17 (2): 126–160. doi:10.2307/4241723. JSTOR 4241723.
- Saggs, H. W. F. (1956). "The Nimrud Letters, 1952: Part III". Iraq. 18 (1): 40–56. doi:10.2307/4199596. JSTOR 4199596.
- Saggs, H. W. F. (1963). "The Nimrud Letters, 1952: Part VI". Iraq. 25 (1): 70–80. doi:10.2307/4199732. JSTOR 4199732.
- Saggs, H. W. F. (1959). "The Nimrud Letters, 1952: Part V". Iraq. 21 (2): 158–179. doi:10.2307/4199658. JSTOR 4199658.
- Saggs, H. W. F. (1958). "The Nimrud Letters, 1952: Part IV". Iraq. 20 (2): 182–212. doi:10.2307/4199640. JSTOR 4199640.
- Saggs, H. W. F. (1965). "The Nimrud Letters, 1952: Part VII". Iraq. 27 (1): 17–32. doi:10.2307/4199777. JSTOR 4199777.
- Saggs, H. W. F. (1966). "The Nimrud Letters, 1952: Part VIII". Iraq. 28 (2): 177–191. doi:10.2307/4199811. JSTOR 4199811.
- Saggs, H. W. F. (1974). "The Nimrud Letters, 1952: Part IX". Iraq. 36 (1/2): 199–221. doi:10.2307/4199989. JSTOR 4199989.
- Iraq, British School of Archaeology in (2001). The Nimrud Letters, 1952. British School of Archaeology in Iraq. ISBN 978-0-903472-20-3.
