= Suicide of Razis =

Suicide described in 2 Maccabees

Johann Christoph Weigel illustration of Razis hurling himself towards a crowd of soldiers

The suicide of Razis (Note: Also transliterated as Raxis, Radias, Razias, Raxius and Rhazis. See meaning of Razis's name.) is described in 2 Maccabees, as part of its narrative of the Maccabean Revolt. According to the book, the Seleucid governor Nicanor was after Judas Maccabeus, who led the revolt. Nicanor sent 500 troops to arrest Razis, a Jerusalem elder known as "the father of the Jews," to make an example out of him and strike a blow to the Jewish community. Faced by the crowd of soldiers who set fire to his tower, preferring a noble death over capture, Razis first tried to fall upon his sword, and when that failed, hurled himself off the wall into the enemy ranks below. Surviving the fall despite severe injuries, Razis charged through the crowd, tore out his own entrails, and threw them at the soldiers while praying for his resurrection with his dying breath.

Scholars interpret Razis's suicide not merely as an act of desperation, but as a deliberate and performative ritual response to Seleucid persecution and internal betrayal. By throwing his own entrails at the surrounding enemy troops, they say Razis sought to ritually defile and spiritually neutralize his Gentile adversaries. Scholars say that the story of Razis's self-disembowelment and the hurling of his organs toward the crowd is without peer in Jewish tradition or in any other tradition.

Rather than viewing suicide negatively as in the Hebrew Bible, 2 Maccabees presents Razis's self-inflicted violence as a sacrificial act of divine wrath on behalf of the community. Furthermore, scholars have analyzed Razis as a model citizen of the Jerusalem polis whose honorific title, "father of the Jews," mirrors Graeco-Roman civic honors like pater patriae. By choosing to die nobly to avoid humiliating outrages at the hands of sinners, Razis stands as a loyal counterpart to Judas Maccabeus and a direct antithesis to high priest Alcimus, who had voluntarily defiled himself during crisis.

The origin of Razis's name is also debated, with scholars proposing Hebrew, biblical, or Persian origins. Although the the epitomist (the abridger of the book) approved of the suicide, later Christians diverged from this view. The story's historicity has been questioned, with some scholars proposing alternatives to parts of the narrative.

== Meaning of Razis's name ==
The name Razis is not documented for any other Jew, and has several variations. While in the original Greek copies of the 2 Maccabees Razis's name is spelled Ραζὶς, variations of the name exist, and some scholars have suggested that the spelling Pαξις should be accepted instead, "due to frequent confusion of ζ and ξ".

Some scholars relate the name to the Hebrew word razi (רָזִי) in Isa 24:16, the meaning of which is unclear, with Jonathan Goldstein further tying the name to the repeated רָזִי-לִי רָזִי-לִי (translated by him as "I pine away, I pine away") in the same verse, proposing that Isa 24:16–18 prophesies Razis's death. Wilibald Grimm also says the name is "a nickname based on his fate", saying that the name stems from the Hebrew רזי (translated by him as "leannes, wasting, destruction"). Carl Friedrich Keil proposed a link to ratsa (רצה), meaning "favour". van Henten stated parallels can be drawn between "Razis" and the Hebrew root רצ"ה, used in Rabbinical literature to mean "appease" or "effect atonement".

Some scholars, such as Martin Schwartz, argue that the name has Iranian origins. Martin Schwarz compared "Razis" with the Avestan Frārāzi-, Bagorazos and Phandarazos. (Note: With Bag- meaning "god" and Phand- meaning "path") Rāzan and rāzah mean "arrangement," "setting in order" or "preparation." Martin Schwarz says Razis's name could be a shortened version of one of the aforementioned Avestan names. Aya Barsky-Elishav also suggests Iranian origins, linking the name with the Persian raz, meaning "secret".

== Background ==
In 2 Maccabees, Razis's death takes place amid Seleucid oppression of the Jewish people. Measures were introduced to abolish Jewish law and practices, making Greek customs obligatory. These measures profaned the temple, banned Jewish festivals and Sabbath observance, and may have even forbidden openly confessing to being a Jew. Jews were compelled to consume defiling foods and renounce Judaism, or be tortured to death.

2 Maccabees 14 describes the events leading up to the suicide of Razis. Following the rise of the new Seleucid king Demetrius I Soter in 162 BCE, Alcimus applied and regained the high priesthood. It tells that after regaining his status, Alcimus convinced the king that peace in Judea required eliminating Judas Maccabaeus. Nicanor was appointed governor of Judea to defeat Judas. While adopting a peaceful approach at first, a second visit by Alcimus to the king forced Nicanor to act against Judas; Judas subsequently went into hiding. When the temple priests refused to surrender Judas, Nicanor swore that he would raze the sanctuary to the ground, tear down the altar, and erect a temple to Dionysus in its place. The priests prayed to God to defend the temple.

The attempted arrest of Razis and his suicide are then described. Razis's story gave Judas and his men time to move to Samaria and gave Nicanor time to hear of that. A battle between Judas Maccabeus's men and Nicanor then ensued, the Battle of Adasa. According to van Henten, Razis's story was the impetus for the final victory.

== Events ==
The text tells that prior to the incident, Razis, a Jerusalem elder, "had brought in a decision for Judaism" (κρίσιν εἰσενηνεγμένος Ἰουδαϊσμος). It is unclear what this passage means. Several scholars have proposed that this may indicate that Razis had been tried under previous Seleucid administrations, but this interpretation leaves open the question of why Razis didn't end up like those who had been tried in chapters 6 and 7. Razis was a revered figure among the Jews and was called "the father of the Jews" due to how much he loved his people.

According to the book, Nicanor ordered over 500 soldiers to arrest him in order to set an example (Note: This is in contrast to the other martyrs of the book, who were explicitly arrested for not abiding by the decrees and for continuing to practice Judaism) and strike a blow against the Jewish community. The soldiers surrounded and besieged the multi-story tower (pyrgos) where Razis was located, setting fire to the doors to trap him inside. Preferring to die nobly rather than be captured and subjected to outrages by his enemies, Razis fell upon his own sword. Due to the haste and distress of the moment, the sword did not hit any vital organs and failed to kill him.

2 Maccabees then tells that Razis climbed up to the wall of the structure and hurled himself down into the mass of enemy soldiers below. The soldiers quickly pulled back to avoid his falling body, clearing a space where Razis then hit the ground. Despite severe injuries from both the sword wound and the fall, Razis rose in a fury, and ran through the ranks of the enemy crowd as his blood spilled on them. Reaching a steep rock, Razis used both hands to tear out his own entrails and hurled them into the crowd of soldiers. With his final breath, he called upon the "Lord of life and spirit" to restore his body parts to him after his death.

== Analysis ==
The overall account is rather abrupt without much setup, possibly due to the epitomist (Note: The person who abridged Jason of Cyrene's 5-volume work on the history on the Maccabean revolt into the epitome of 2 Maccabees) omitting text as part of the abridgment; it does not explain if Nicanor had a more specific reason than distaste for the Jews to order the arrest of Razis, and if Razis knew of Judas's location, why 500 men were necessary, or how Razis ended up in a fortified tower. Menahem Stern proposes that he was targeted since he was "one of the most prominent opposers of Nicanor's policies". The story's ending, "he left life in this way", mirrors the telling of Eleazar's death in 6:31.

=== Theological reception ===
Theologically, the compiler of the text approves of Razis's suicide. This stance was not uncommon in Judaism, which allowed suicide in certain dire situations. According to Robert Barry, the suicide "was seen as a death virtually commanded by Yahweh, as was Samson's". Barsky-Elishav says that had the author not expressed their appreciation to the suicide, it may have been minimized or not recorded at all. Stern adds that the author "did not even feel the need" to explain or justify the suicide beyond Razis not wanting to fall captive and potentially suffer outrages by his enemies.

Goldstein writes that Josephus's (a Roman–Jewish historian and military leader) opposition to suicide following the fall of the town he was in charge of defending, despite his men pushing for it, may explain why he did not discuss Razis in his history books. The 10th-century chronicle Josippon wrote on Razis without disapproving his suicide.

==== Among Christians ====
In Thamugadi, a major Donatist city, 419 CE, Roman troops sent to seize a Donatist basilica in order to hand it over to Catholics, were met with Donatists led by bishop Gaudentius, barricading themselves and threatening to burn themselves alive had the Romans used force. Razis was used by Gaudentius as "a model for this behavior". The epitomist's endorsement of Razis's action was awkward in the Catholic Church, which both considered the 2 Maccabees divinely inspired but also sharply disapproved of direct suicide. In a letter to governor Dulcitius, Catholic theologian Augustine of Hippo "had to admit" that despite having "already refuted" the claim that the Donatists' self-inflicted deaths could amount to martyrdom, he hadn't responded and addressed Razis's example. Ultimately, Augustine attempted to neutralize the theological impact of Razis's example by arguing that his actions were strictly bound to the historical epoch of the Jews and held no moral authority for the new Christian era.

Martin Luther, in the introduction to his 1545 translation of 2 Maccabees, complained about Razis's story. This, among other factors, led Luther to conclude that while a valid case can be made for including 1 Maccabees in the biblical canon, the exclusion of 2 Maccabees was ultimately warranted, despite the positive elements he believed it to hold.

=== Ritual and Jewish perspective ===
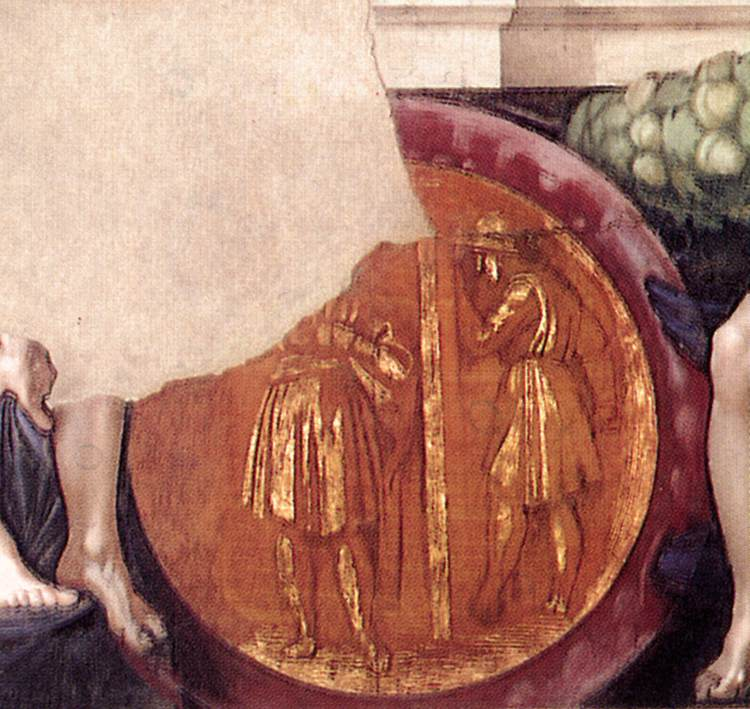
Michaelangelo painting identified as 'Suicide of Razis' or 'Joab sneaking up on Abner to murder him'

The narrative of Razis's suicide in 2 Maccabees 14:37–46 can be understood as both an instrumental and performative exit ritual (Note: Death or removal of a person (often a scapegoat or martyr) to remove a harmful presence from a community and thereby restore or preserve its well‑being) responding to external Seleucid threats and internal (Alcimus's) betrayal. Faced with imminent capture by Seleucid forces under Nicanor, Razis chooses death over enslavement and desecration, echoing the biblical precedent of Saul by first attempting to fall upon his sword to preserve his status as a free man. When this initial stroke fails, he leaps from the stronghold walls and runs through the enemy ranks, spilling his own blood that, from a Jewish ritual perspective, serves to defile and spiritually neutralize his Gentile adversaries.

In his final act, Razis hurls his disemboweled entrails (τὰ ἔντερα) at the surrounding crowd, using his inner organs to inflict impurity upon as many enemies as possible. This ritual and the defilement of the enemy soldiers imply that they have been defeated. Viewing this from a Jewish perspective, τὰ ἔντερα may be related to the Hebrew word קרב, which can refer to a person's insides in the literal sense but also in a figurative sense, as the location of a person's life, soul or spirit. Scholars say that the story of Razis's self-disembowelment and the hurling of his organs toward the crowd is without a peer in any tradition.

Razis, acknowledging that the all-knowing and all-powerful god is watching his sacrifice for the Jewish cause, then asks for his body back after death in 2 Maccabees 14:46. The term πνεῦµα καὶ ζωή in verse 46 is a hendiadys referring to the breath of life. This presentation, van Henten says, "builds on the presentation of the creation of humankind in Genesis 2:7, where God breathes life into Adam". From this point of view, he writes, the verse "may point to God's act of breathing life into the bodies of the martyrs and Razis for a second time, analogously to the breath of life narrated in Genesis 2:7". He also added that this final act suggests that Razis did not care at all about his current body, and that God's mercy was bestowed upon Razis only after his death. Lester L. Grabbe cited Razis's hope of resurrection as an example of how 2 Maccabees "shows that faithfulness to the covenant retains all its validity for the individual even when he/she is involved in the punishment of God against an unfaithful generation".

According to Barsky-Elishav, Razis sanctified God during his life, and first and foremost did not want to die. But, she says, he was willing to do it for the sake of his group, the Jewish people. His first choice was to live, but when he couldn't live a normal Jewish life, he chose to sanctify God in his death.

== Hellenistic influence ==
Roger Tomes writes that Razis's suicide is "regarded as a noble act" due to how it "called for courage" and how he escaped "outrages unworthy of his noble birth" by the Seleucids. Tomes identified this with the aristocratic Greek concepts of a noble birth as an important virtue. He further writes that Razis's motivation for his suicide, to escape these outrages, differs from that of the seven Maccabean brothers and is similar to that of the Greek general Alcetas, who "laid hands on himself first in order not to come into the power of his enemies while still living". Barsky-Elishav says that Razis is similar to Eleazar in that he "did not want his old age to bring shame upon his youth". Razis differs from the martyr Eleazar, who handed himself over to the enemy. Daniel R. Schwartz writes that in Razis's case, being killed by others was seen as defiling, forcing Razis to kill himself. Unlike the other martyrs, Razis brought his death by his own hands, mirroring other Greek heroes like Agraulos.

The account of Razis's death in 2 Maccabees 14:37–46 portrays an act of violence directed against the self that functions as an atoning sacrifice for the Jewish people, distinct from the negative portrayals of suicide in the Hebrew Bible. This interpretation arises from the convergence of an evolving Jewish theology of martyrdom, where self-sacrifice for the sanctification of the Divine is vindicated by the expectation of bodily resurrection, and Hellenistic conceptions of a noble death (eugenôs) aimed at restoring honor and collective balance.

Rather than turning his violence outward against the five hundred enemy soldiers surrounding him, Razis inflicts violence entirely upon his own body through a succession of deliberate injuries. Unlike the military-driven liberation seen in 1 Maccabees through armed combat, Willibaldo Ruppenthal Neto writes that 2 Maccabees grounds divine deliverance in the shed blood of its martyrs, drawing inspiration from the Greek pharmakos tradition, where individual physical suffering preserves the wider social body. (Note: This is similar to Day of Atonement's scapegoat ritual where a goat, rather than a person, serves as the object upon which god's wrath falls. Neto says that the leap from the positive view of sacrificing goats to sacrificing humans was influenced by the Greek pharmakos tradition.) Ultimately, by tearing himself apart just as priests did with sacrificed animals, Neto says Razis offers his own body as a sacrifice to God, turning his death through violence against himself into an act of courage and nobility that absorbs God's wrath on behalf of his people. Robert Doran rejects that Razis's actions were a self-sacrifice to save Jerusalem.

Furstenberg and van Henten say a Greek formula was applied in 2 Maccabees to emphasize the importance of martyrdom. According to them, Razis and the other martyrs had an effect of repairing the covenantal relationship between the Jews and God.

=== Similarity to the story of Menoeceus ===
Razis's extended death scene was possibly influenced by the death of Menoeceus in Euripides's play The Phoenician Women (c. 410 BC), who is described as having a similar fate of a self-inflicted sword stroke followed by throwing himself into the enemy.

The story of Menoeceus was later elaborated upon in Thebaid by Statius in the 1st century. The extent to which Menoeceus's story as told there is similar to Razis's suicide is debated. While van Henten maintains that the similarity is even "more striking" than the similarity to the story in The Phoenician Women, Doran wrote that there are major differences between the stories, as follows:

- Thebaid tells that Menoeceus was responding to an oracle prediction that Thebes can only be saved through his death. He demonstrated his willingness to be a victim for the city's sake and only needed one strike to kill himself. In contrast, Razis was being clumsy and missed his first blow.
- While Menoeceus jumped down to fight the enemy, Razis jumped from his tower as a suicide attempt.
- While Menoeceos's purposefully spilled blood served to purify the walls of Thebes, Razis threw his entrails at enemy soldiers.

==== Devotio in Razis's suicide ====
According to van Henten, Stratius's story was likely influenced by the Roman devotio tradition. van Henten sees a devotio formula in how Menoeceus "incites the gods of the arms (armorum supen) and in particular Apollo to grant Thebes his promised goodwill which Menoeceus has bought with his blood." Similarly to Roman generals practicing devotio, Menocieus also dies "in the heart of the enemy". Using these depictions as precedents, van Henten says that the epitomist probably saw Razis's suicide as a form of devotio.

According to van Henten, when Razis jumped toward the soldiers, he was attempting to hit them with his body and die "in their midst"; the soldiers' retreat possibly indicates that they knew that Razis was attempting devotio and tried to avoid it. He adds that the loss of blood and organs indicate the dedication required for devotio. Basing himself on the analogy with Menoeceus and the Roman devotio, van Henten says it's reasonable to assume that Razis's actions kicked off Nicanor's defeat. According to him, "because of [Razis's] self-sacrifice, Nicanor's soldiers cannot avoid their defeat against Judas Maccabaeus."

While Doran agrees that Razis's actions initiated Nicanor's defeat, he disagrees that a devotio was performed. Doran points out that unlike the seventh brother in 7:37-38, Razis's last prayer was to be resurrected, not to save the Jewish nation and bring God's mercy through his death. Hurling his entrails at the soldiers symbolizes that they do not control any part of him, rather than the purification of the people. Razis's bravery is the main point of the story, not that his sacrifice aimed to save the community. Thus, Doran says, Razis's suicide matches Plato's reasons for suicide.

=== As a model citizen of the Jewish State ===
In 2 Maccabees, the narrative of liberation portrays the Jewish state along the lines of a Greek city-state (polis) centered on Jerusalem, within which prominent figures like the martyrs and the elder Razis function as model citizens. Razis is introduced in 2 Maccabees 14:37 in highly honourable terms as one of the elders of Jerusalem and a great patriot. His designation as an elder suggests that he was a member of the council of elders (gerousia), which served as the aristocratic governing body of the polis of Jerusalem. (Note: Though Goldstein says that we can't rule for certain whether gerousia he was member of the or just an old man)

On account of his goodwill (eunoia) toward his compatriots, he held the honorary title "father of the Jews." This designation functions analogously to Hellenistic and Roman civic honorifics like parens or pater patriae ("father of the fatherland"), which were awarded for saving individuals or the entire body politic. van Henten say that this civic goodwill connects Razis directly with Judas the Maccabee, who is similarly celebrated in patriotic terms as "the man who maintained his youthful goodwill (eunoia) toward his compatriots (homoethneis)". The two are the youngest martyrs in 2 Maccabees.

Razis was denounced to Nicanor because he had actively and zealously risked life and body for "Judaism", an identity marker denoting the Jewish cause. In earlier times of discord (ameixia), Razis had "stood firm" with "exemplary loyalty" to the Jewish cause and was condemned for it, providing an antithesis to the renegade former high priest Alcimus, who had voluntarily defiled himself during the Seleucid crisis. (Note: While it was originally written that Alcimus defiled himself during times of war, Goldstein suggests that it makes more sense that it was originally written "times of peace". He says that such text would further highlight the difference between Alcimus and Razis, since Razis risked himself at a time of war.) van Henten wrote that when Nicanor sent an enormous contingent of more than five hundred soldiers to arrest him, the sheer size of the force highlighted both Razis's vital significance to the Jewish people and Nicanor’s eagerness to capture him.

Faced with capture, Razis chose suicide to ensure that he would die in a noble way (eugenōs apothanein) worthy of his noble birth (eugeneia) rather than fall into the hands of sinners and suffer humiliating outrages. van Henten linked his refusal to fall into the hands of gentile sinners to the resolve of Judas’ warriors who could not allow the Jewish people to fall into the hands of blasphemous gentiles. By successfully taking his own life before he could be captured, Razis turned Nicanor’s troops from a "brute snatch squad" into a helpless "crowd of spectators". Razis, so van Henten say, thus emerged in the text as a symbolic representation of Jewish nobility, independence, and resilience.

== Historicity ==
Jonathan A. Goldstein questions the plausibility of the traditional narrative in 2 Maccabees, noting that displaying open hostility toward the Jewish population would have undermined Nicanor's efforts to pacify Judea, and questions the theatrical nature of Razis's suicide. To explain the account, Goldstein suggests that Nicanor realized threatening the Second Temple directly would unify divided Jewish factions against him, much as they had united against Antiochus IV. Instead, Nicanor may have sought to arrest the popular elder Razis on legitimate charges to use him as a substitute hostage, threatening him with torture or execution unless Judas Maccabeus was surrendered. According to this reconstruction, ancient writers who wanted to emphasize Nicanor's threat against the Temple preserved the story of Razis's suicide but omitted the detail that he was intended to replace the Temple as a hostage.

Regarding Razis's motives, Goldstein suggests that if Razis knew Judas's whereabouts, he may have killed himself to avoid revealing the location under torture; if he did not know, his suicide would have prevented Nicanor from using him as leverage to force other Jews to betray Judas and give his location up. Alternatively, Goldstein says that the original chronicler, Jason of Cyrene, whose work was the source of 2 Maccabees, clearly admired the act and may have believed Razis killed himself to escape an anticipated restoration of the forced cult by Nicanor.

Among Hellenistic histography, 2 Maccabees is considered a prime example of "pathetic" historiography, meaning it employs vivid, dramatic descriptions to evoke an emotional response and draw the reader into the experiences of the subjects. Daniel R. Schwartz identifies the graphic portrayal of Razis's blood "flowing like a fountain" in verse 45 as an "excellent example" of this style.

=== As a Christian addition ===
Some scholars, Folker Siegert among them, argue that Razis's suicide and the stories of the other martyrs of 2 Maccabees originate as later Christian additions to the book. Siegert claims that martyrdom, defined as a self-sacrifice that's violent in nature for the sake of the collective with posthumous vindication, originated within Christianity in response to Roman persecution. He points out that the term µάρτυς ("witness"), from which the Latin term "martyr" is derived, does not appear in the book. While acknowledging that the Jewish ideas of the time are consistent with the concept of self-sacrifice in the name of Jewish law, he says that this concept of martyrdom is not.

Siegert further says that themes such as bodily resurrection and atoning through a beneficial death as distinctly Christian concepts. In particular, Siegert observes that the term ζωή ("life") occur exclusively in the martyrdom narrative of chapter 7 and Razis's suicide.

van Henten dismisses the claim that the lack of the early Greek martyr terminology (µάρτυς, "witness") precludes the presence of martyrdom in 2 Maccabees as a fallacy, noting that it's "widely acknowledged" that specialized vocabulary generally develops after a practice has already come to prominence. van Henten further claims that analysis shows that the vocabulary in the martyrdom sections of 2 Maccabees is consistent with the rest of the book. Dismissing Siegert's claim that the concept of martyrdom originated in response to Roman persecution (and thus could not be a Jewish concept prior to it) as essentialistic, van Henten says that it is not supported by textual evidence and "can easily result in circular reasoning".
