= Chapters of 2 Maccabees =

15 chapters of the book

The book 2 Maccabees contains 15 chapters. It is a deuterocanonical book originally written in Koine Greek that is part of the Catholic, Eastern Orthodox, and Oriental Orthodox Christian biblical canons. It is still considered an important source on the Maccabean Revolt by Jews, Protestants, and secular historians of the period who do not necessarily hold the book as part of a scriptural canon. The chapters chronicle events in Judea from around 178–161 BCE during the Second Temple Period. Judea was at the time ruled by the Seleucid Empire, one of the Greek successor states that resulted from the conquests of Alexander the Great. 2 Maccabees was written by an unknown Egyptian Jew. The account is distinct from the book 1 Maccabees, which was written by someone in the Hasmonean kingdom that was formed after the success of the revolt. In general, 2 Maccabees has a more directly religious perspective than 1 Maccabees, frequently directly crediting prayers, miraculous interventions, and divine will for events.

The most influential chapters of the book are likely Chapter 6 and Chapter 7 which deal with the martyrdom of the woman with seven sons and Eleazar the scribe during the persecution of Judaism under King Antiochus IV Epiphanes. Chapter 7 and Chapter 12 both discuss a coming bodily resurrection of the righteous; 2 Maccabees is one of the earliest pieces of literature to advocate for this belief. Chapter 15 is also one of the earliest references to the Jewish festival of Purim. While 2 Maccabees was originally written for an audience of Hellenistic Jews, verses in its chapters have been used in some branches of Christianity as scriptural backing for indulgences, prayers for the dead, and the intercession of saints. These became controversial during the Protestant Reformation, and was one of the factors that led to Protestant denominations considering the book as non-canonical.

Like other books of the Bible, the division of the text into chapters and verses was not in its original form, and was instead added later.

== Chapters 1 and 2 ==
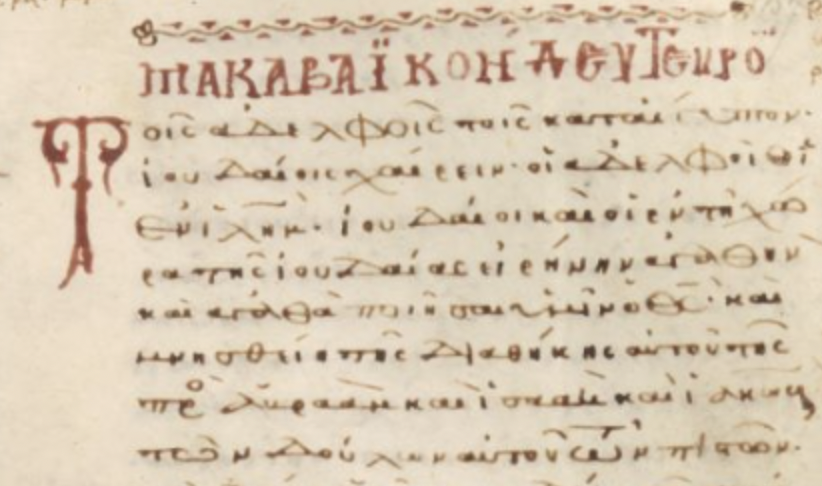
The opening verses of 2 Maccabees in Koine Greek from a 13th–15th century manuscript of the Septuagint

The first two chapters are an introduction and not part of the main narrative, which begins in Chapter 3. They consist of two letters to the Jews of Ptolemaic Egypt, followed by the epitomist's preface. Some earlier scholars such as Benedikt Niese interpreted it as one long letter, although this position finds little support since the work of Elias Bickerman in the 1930s in favor of seeing the text as two letters.

Many scholars question whether these letters were truly authentic, especially the second one which appears to have, if based on an authentic letter at some point, been affected by manuscript interpolations over time. There are also questions of whether the epitomist who wrote the main narrative was who attached these letters to the beginning of the narrative, or if some other compiler did so. Arguments against the epitomist being the one who prepended the letters include that the epitomist's preface appears to be written as if it was an introduction already, with the two letters detracting from this literarily; that the account of King Antiochus's death in 1:13-16 differs from the account in Chapter 9; and that the epitomist's narrative builds toward Nicanor's Day as the finale and most important lesson, while the letters instead focus on Hanukkah and the cleansing of the Temple.

=== First letter ===
The Jews in Jerusalem and those in the land of Judea,
To their Jewish kindred in Egypt,
Greetings and true peace.

— 2 Maccabees 1:1

The first letter, from 1:1-1:10a, is an invitation to celebrate the rededication of the Temple in Jerusalem: the festival of Hanukkah. It opens with a salutation and stylized expressions of good will. It then segues into a brief summary of how the troubles began with High Priest Jason (described in Chapter 4), a reminder of how the Jews of Judea called out for aid from the Jews of Egypt in the past, and closes with the encouragement of Hanukkah celebration for diaspora Jews (1:9-1:10a): "And now see that you keep the festival of booths in the month of Chislev, in the one hundred and eighty-eighth year." The year 188 of the Seleucid era (SE) is equivalent to 124–123 BCE. If interpreted as a reference to the letter originally being sent then, it would suggest that the form of 2 Maccabees we have today was arranged in that year or later. (Note: Daniel R. Schwartz translates 1.9-1.10a somewhat differently: "And now (we have written you) so that you shall celebrate the days of (the festival of) Tabernacles in the month of Kislev [of the year 148 / in the year 188]." Most scholars (e.g. Goldstein, Bickerman, Doran) argue for reading it as the year 188 of the Seleucid era. Schwartz contests this reading of 10a and advocates for reading the year as 148; he believes the "188" reading is a scribal error as the two can look similar in Greek (ΡΠΔ for 188, ΡΜΔ for 148). The Seleucid calendar's year 148 corresponds to the spring of 164 BCE to the spring of 163 BCE in the Babylonian count used in Judea, with Kislev roughly coinciding with December 164 BCE, so if interpreted that way, the year is merely dating the cleansing of the Temple by Judas Maccabeus.)

Another date of interest is found in verse 7, that "In the reign of Demetrius, in the one hundred and sixty-ninth year, we Jews wrote to you," suggesting that the letter is referencing an earlier letter. 169 SE would correspond to 143 BCE, which was indeed during the reign of a Demetrius: King Demetrius II Nicator. According to 1 Maccabees 13:31–42, the nascent Hasmonean state was dealing with the hostile Diodotus Tryphon at the time, and allied with Demetrius II against him. The letter suggests that perhaps the Jews of Judea had also reached out to the Jews of Egypt for support against Tryphon.

=== Second letter ===
The people of Jerusalem and of Judea and the Council of Elders and Judas,
To Aristobulus, who is of the family of the anointed priests, teacher of King Ptolemy, and to the Jews in Egypt,
Greetings and good health.

— 2 Maccabees 1:10

The second letter, from 1:10b to 2:18, is purportedly a letter from the gerusia (Council of Elders) of Jerusalem and Judas Maccabeus upon receiving news of the death of King Antiochus IV Epiphanes but before the celebration of the first feast of the Dedication of the Temple (Hanukkah), and thus an earlier letter than the first one. It seems to be addressed to Aristobulus of Alexandria, a figure mentioned by Clement of Alexandria and Eusebius. The letter describes the death of Antiochus while attacking a temple dedicated to the goddess Nanaya in Persia and how God saved Jerusalem by expelling "those who drew themselves up to war".

The letter then continues an extended analogy going backward in time tying Judas's Temple to figures in the Jewish past. The priest Nehemiah (5th century BCE) is said to have found a special liquid used to kindle the altar's holy fire called nephthar or nephthai (perhaps related to naphtha or petroleum). The liquid was then poured into rocks. The story continues with how the prophet Jeremiah (6th–7th century BCE) hid both the liquid and various other Temple appurtenances for Nehemiah to find later. It also includes a brief story that King Solomon (10th century BCE) prayed for fire from heaven in a manner similar to Moses, which consumed a sacrifice. He then proceeded to celebrate for eight days. The letter writes that Nehemiah also established a library of writings and books, and that Judas has followed his example and done likewise, compiling a library of Jewish histories. The story of Nehemiah pouring the mysterious liquid into the rocks is possibly related to 10:3 which states that after purifying the Temple, Judas "ignited rocks and extracted fire from them". This would establish a direct link between the altar of Nehemiah and Judas's temple. The theological intent is to tie Judas's cleansed temple to the original First Temple and establish it as equally legitimate. The altar fire came from heaven to Solomon; Jeremiah hid the Temple items and the fire as a way of ensuring the survival of the Temple for the future in a way beyond the reach of foreign rule during the Babylonian exile; Nehemiah rediscovered it; and now Judas had reignited this same fire reaching all the way back to heaven.

Similar to the first letter, it concludes with an invitation for the Jews of Egypt to join the Jews in Judea in simultaneously celebrating Hanukkah, an eight-day celebration of purification and fire, akin to Solomon's claimed celebration. Presumably, Egyptian Jews needed convincing, as the feast of Hanukkah was a new invention not described in the Hebrew Bible.

While some sort of letter from Judas to Egypt existing cannot be ruled out, scholars generally consider large parts of the letter forged or interpolated at a much later date than when Judas was alive. Jonathan A. Goldstein finds signs that the letter's claimed chronology is questionable, and that the letter makes more sense as a later writing than the first epistle. Many of the stories in the letter appear in no other piece of earlier literature—Nehemiah and the sacred fire, the quotes attributed to Moses, and so on. Robert Doran suggests that the concerns in the letter suggest a more settled state of affairs for when it was authored, perhaps during the reign of later Hasmonean kings such as John Hyrcanus or Alexander Jannaeus.

One aspect of note is the location of the temple of Nanaya. The letter indicates that it was in Persia, but Elymais is where the wealthy temple was according to 1 Maccabees, Josephus, and Appian. It is unclear whether the author considered Elymais part of Persia or simply made a geographical error.

In later Jewish theology, Abraham Geiger, the founder of Reform Judaism, believed that verse 2:17 ("It is God who has saved all his people, and has returned the inheritance to all, and the kingship and the priesthood and the consecration") indicated the author had a belief in a universal priesthood shared by all Jews, and that the author of the letter had an anti-Sadducee bent.

=== Epitomist's preface ===
.. all this, which has been set forth by Jason of Cyrene in five volumes, we shall attempt to condense into a single book.

— 2 Maccabees 2:23

In 2:19-32, the anonymous writer, referred to variously as the epitomist, the epitomator, the author, and the abridger, introduces himself and his work to the readers. He discusses his effort in making an abridgment, or epitome, of Jason of Cyrene's five-volume history and compares himself to a decorator who adds beauty to an existing structure. He is clearly someone possessed of a strong education in both Greek literature and Judaism.

One minor point of curiosity is that 2:19 refers to the exploits of "Judas Maccabeus and his brothers", yet the main history pays little attention to Judas's brothers, focusing on Judas personally instead. This is in contrast to 1 Maccabees, which often discussed and referred to the rest of the Hasmonean family. Whether the epitomist wanted to discuss and highlight the brothers but Jason's work simply discussed them little, or he played down the brothers in the main history but felt obligated to mention them in the preface due to their fame, is unclear.

Another aspect that comes across as odd to modern readers are the complaints of "sweat and sleepless nights" in composing the epitome in 2:26. While reading strangely today, such a statement of the author proclaiming how hard they worked was common in ancient prefaces of the era. A similar passage is also seen in 2 Corinthians 11:27.

== Chapter 3 ==
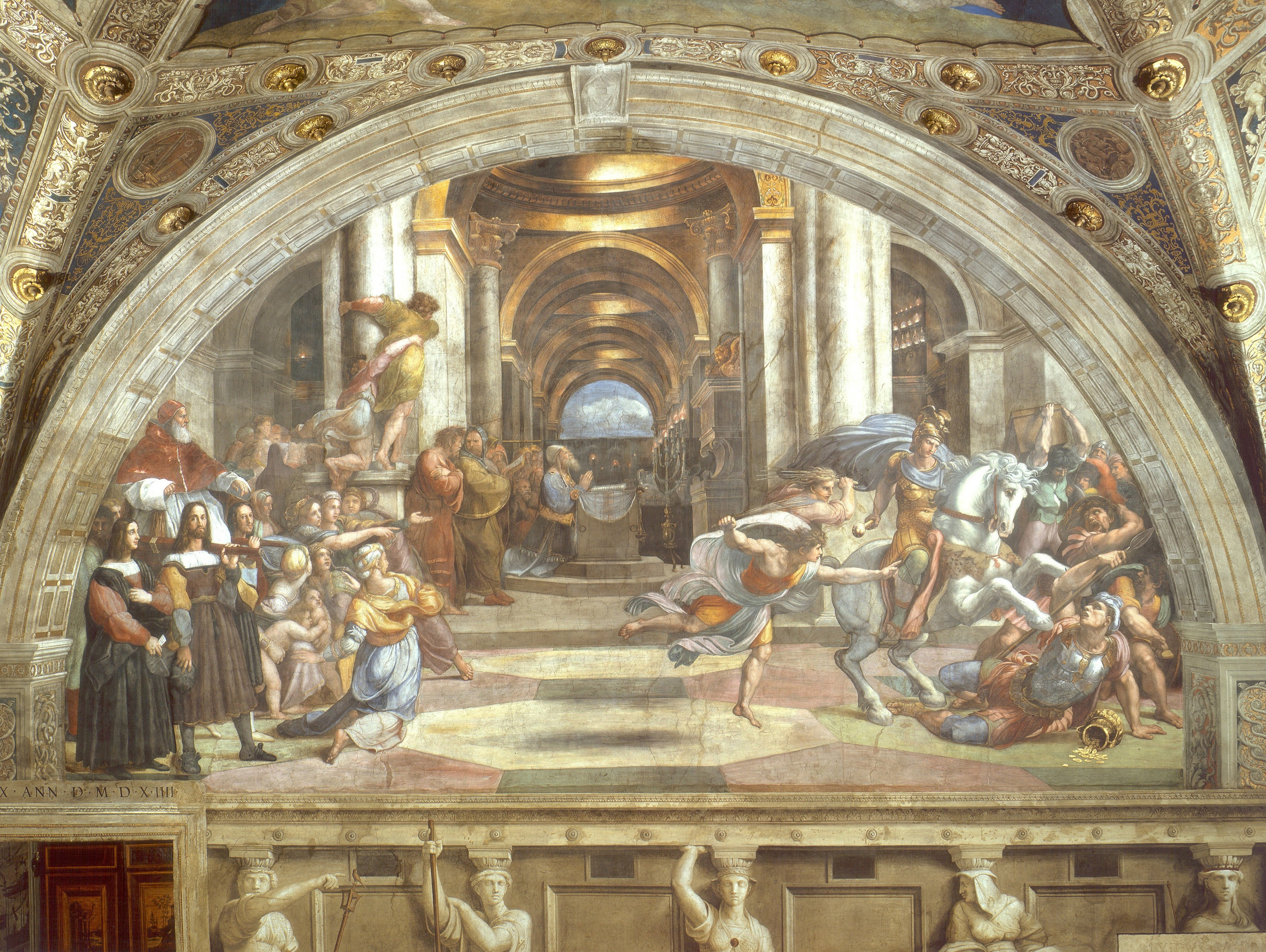
Raphael's "The Expulsion of Heliodorus from the Temple", a 1511 work

.. this man [Heliodorus] who had just entered the aforesaid treasury with a great retinue and all his bodyguard but was now unable to help himself. They recognized clearly the sovereign power of God.

— 2 Maccabees 3:28

The third chapter recounts the story of Heliodorus's attempt to tax the Temple. It is a self-contained story and a prelude to the main history of the revolt, but establishes that God protects the Second Temple when his people and their leaders are faithful. During the term of Onias III as High Priest and Seleucus IV Philopator as king (reigned from 187–175 BCE), a Jewish supervisor named Simon has a falling out with Onias. He tells the governor (ethnarch) that the Temple had a gigantic stockpile of illegal treasure that could be lawfully taken, as revenge on Onias. The king sends Heliodorus to investigate. Upon Heliodorus's arrival in Jerusalem, Onias denies Simon's claim; Heliodorus says that the money the Temple did have must nevertheless be impounded. All Jerusalem prays for deliverance by God. On the day that Heliodorus and his entourage visit the temple's treasury, a fearful apparition of a horseman wearing golden armor appears. Two mysterious handsome and strong youths also appear, wearing splendid raiment, and standing on either side of Heliodorus, deliver a barrage of blows and floggings to him. Heliodorus, near death, is carried off in a litter; his entourage begs Onias III for help. Not wishing for trouble with the king, Onias III performs a sacrifice for Heliodorus's salvation and healing. The youths, presumably angels, tell Heliodorus that he should be grateful to Onias, and that his new mission is to proclaim the greatness and power of God to all. After he returns to Antioch, Heliodorus testifies to the power of God, and wryly suggests that Seleucus IV send some enemy of his to Jerusalem next, as he'll have him back flogged, if alive at all.

The basic historicity of such a tax dispute is uncontested. The Book of Daniel seems to allude to the incident in Daniel 11:20. The Heliodorus stele documents an order from Seleucus IV to Heliodorus in 178 BCE to attend to the temples of Coele-Syria and Phoenicia, and the appointment of a person named Olympiodorus to supervise the province's temples. While this perhaps suggests that it is more likely Olympiodorus was who visited Jerusalem's temple rather than Heliodorus personally, the basic memory of an attempt to interfere with the temple that was rebuffed is probably accurate, even if the more miraculous elements such as the heavenly horseman and handsome men are legendary.

Onias III reports that the temple contained deposits belonging to widows and orphans, as well as the treasure of Hyrcanus son of Tobias totaling 400 silver talents and 200 gold talents. In the era, gold talents were worth about 10 times silver talents, so this would be equivalent to 2400 talents—a large sum for the era, but not quite the incalculable treasure described by Simon. For comparison, the Seleucids owed an annual tribute of 1,000 silver talents to Rome under the terms of the Treaty of Apamea. Hyrcanus has usually been considered the same person as a Hyrcanus described in Josephus's work, a patriarch of the Tobiads. One of his best-known traits was that he was wealthy, having grown rich during Ptolemaic rule of the region, although much of what is known of him is colored by folklore-style exaggerations. Jonathan A. Goldstein argues the reference to him was added later by a follower of Onias IV; Robert Doran suggests it might be original, and the author was attempting to emphasize the unity of all Jews despite the known animosity against the Tobiads.

Theologically, the author emphasizes that the inviolability and holiness of the Temple stems from the people and their leaders, a theme also seen in earlier Jewish writing. The prelude thus serves as a positive counterpart to the troubles later. The author also writes as a diaspora Jew living under Greek rule in Ptolemaic Egypt. Thus, the return to the status quo ante of Jews living under tolerant Greek rule is not portrayed as problematic, but rather God's will and a suitably happy ending. This contrasts with the more absolutist stance of the author of 1 Maccabees, who considers the only honorable peace one with Jewish autonomy and preferably independence.

== Chapter 4 ==
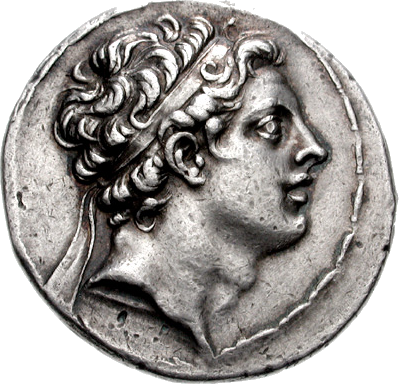
Face side of a coin of the Seleucid Empire minted with Antiochus IV's portrait.

After receiving the king's orders he [Menelaus] returned, possessing no qualification for the high-priesthood, but having the hot temper of a cruel tyrant and the rage of a savage wild beast.

— 2 Maccabees 4:25

Chapter 4 is where the main history begins. It depicts the turbulent temple politics of 175–168 BCE that saw the succession of Onias III, Jason, and Menelaus as High Priest. Simon, from Chapter 3, continues his dispute with Onias III; Onias complains to the king about him. After Seleucus IV's death, Antiochus IV Epiphanes comes to the throne (~175 BCE). Jason, a brother of Onias III, offers a larger tribute to Antiochus than what Onias was paying, and is appointed the new High Priest. He additionally acquires permission to reform parts of the city along Greek lines and to found a gymnasium for the education of the young in the Greek style. The author accuses High Priest Jason of treating lightly the ancestral rights and guarantees of autonomy to the Jews with his innovations, and being impious and unpriestly. Three years into Jason's rule, Menelaus, the brother of Simon who had disputed with Onias III earlier, was sent to the king to bring the temple's tribute. Menelaus betrayed Jason, however, and offered Antiochus IV an even higher tribute if he was given the office of High Priest instead. His gambit successful, Menelaus returned to Jerusalem with the king's orders to make him the new High Priest. Jason was forced into exile to live among the Ammonites. While Jason was an impious "Hellenizer", the author depicts Menelaus as both a Hellenizer and an outright criminal. Menelaus embezzles golden artifacts from the Temple to sell.

Back in Antioch, the king is away with the army to stabilize the discontent cities of Tarsus and Mallus in Cilicia, in the Anatolian peninsula. He appoints a regent named Andronicus to be in charge during his absence. Menelaus bribes Andronicus with such stolen treasure as well. Onias III accuses Menelaus of the crime, then seeks sanctuary at a Greek shrine in Daphne. Menelaus and Andronicus plot to get rid of Onias III, and Andronicus lures him outside the shrine and murders him. Jews and righteous Greeks alike petition the king for justice for Andronicus's murder of Onias; Antiochus IV agrees and executes Andronicus on the same spot on which Onias was killed. Back in Jerusalem, Menelaus is deeply unpopular for his continuing sale of golden vessels from the Temple. He appoints a man named Lysimachus, one of his temple-robbers, to form a private police force to defend his rule. Protesters and Lysimachus's force fight it out; the protesters prevail, and Lysimachus is defeated poetically near the treasury he had stolen from. The Jews send a delegation to Tyre where the king is traveling to accuse Menelaus of his crimes. Menelaus, however, sends a bribe to Ptolemy, son of Dorymenes, a Seleucid official who advocates on his behalf to Antiochus IV. Menelaus is acquitted of the accusations, and the accusers themselves are executed. As the chapter concludes, Menelaus continues in office thanks to Ptolemy's greed.

The depiction in Chapter 4 of the internal temple politics is found nowhere else in ancient sources; while 1 Maccabees and Josephus vaguely allude to disputes over the High Priesthood, they are bare-bones mentions. 2 Maccabees thus is generally allowed to stand on its own, undisputed, by most scholars. The one area where sources differ is on the death of Onias III. 2 Maccabees says he was murdered by Andronicus at Menelaus's behest, and Andronicus was subsequently executed for the crime. However, Josephus seems to indicate Onias III was still active in Egypt at a later date in his The Jewish War; and Diodorus Siculus gives a different reason for Andronicus's execution: that he had murdered a young son of Seleucus IV. Most scholars consider both these accounts to be less reliable than 2 Maccabees: they are written much later; Josephus appears to contradict and correct his own history of the high priests in his Jewish Antiquities; and Diodorus's account is not strictly contradictory to the version in 2 Maccabees, if Andronicus was executed for multiple accumulated crimes over time and the author of 2 Maccabees chose to emphasize the one he cared about. Another part considered questionable by some scholars is the story of Menelaus bribing one of the king's courtiers in Tyre rather than the king directly. This is largely because it is exceptionally common in ancient literature to blame problems on a king's bad advisors rather than the king directly, as a less radical statement more likely to evade censorship, and the king is not portrayed as unhinged yet in this chapter. However, the narrative directly blames Antiochus IV for evil acts later, so it is difficult to know for sure. Another aspect seen as an exaggeration is the author depicting the street mob of protesters as armed with trash, yet defeating 3,000 armed men. Some sort of civil disorder is plausible, but this is presumably an "improvement" on the actual incident to emphasize Lysimachus's just punishment by God.

The death of Onias III can be loosely dated to 170 BCE based on archaeological evidence, such as a cuneiform Babylonian kings list that seem to mention the death of the young son of Seleucus IV that Diodorus referenced as the reason of Andronicus's execution in 170 BCE.

2 Maccabees puts the blame for events spirally downward squarely on impious Jews such as Jason and Menelaus in its theology. Similar to Chapter 3, it directly calls out the potential support from righteous Gentiles in its story of how Andronicus was considered a murderer even by the Seleucids, and how the inhabitants of Tyre fund a proper funeral for the Jews who accused Menelaus. This is again in contrast to 1 Maccabees, which has little interest in portraying the possibility of peaceful coexistence or non-hostile Gentiles. Verses 18-22 also discusses a story of Jews who participate in the Hellenistic world while still safeguarding their faith, another message that would resonate with diaspora Jews.

== Chapter 5 ==
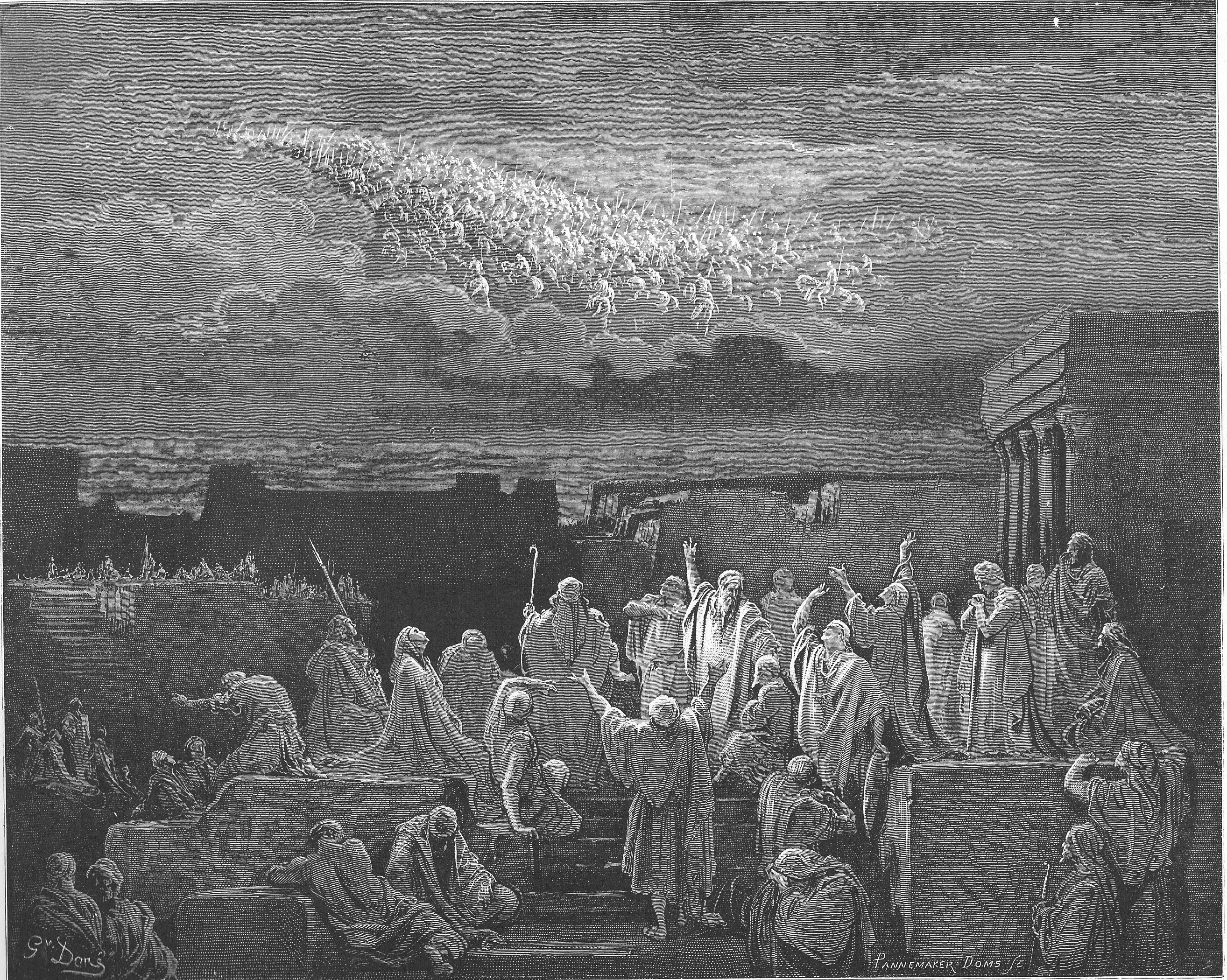
The citizens of Jerusalem observe an apparition of a golden-clad army in the sky while the Seleucid government invades Ptolemaic Egypt during the Sixth Syrian War.

Then there was massacre of young and old, destruction of boys, women, and children, and slaughter of young girls and infants. Within the total of three days eighty thousand were destroyed, forty thousand in hand-to-hand fighting, and as many were sold into slavery as were killed.

— 2 Maccabees 5:13-14

With Menelaus firmly entrenched in his position as High Priest, the fifth chapter discusses more matters of international politics. Jason returns to stir up more trouble. After hearing a rumor that Antiochus IV had perished in his second expedition to Egypt (part of the Sixth Syrian War), he attempts to overthrow Menelaus and retake his position as High Priest. The text leaves unclear the degree of his success in this manner, although Menelaus is apparently forced to retreat. However, Antiochus was not dead, and he attacks Jerusalem upon his return from Egypt, incorrectly inferring that a full-scale revolt against his rule had taken the town. While this does cause Jason's downfall, it also leads to mass misery as Jews are robbed, enslaved, and killed in the resulting sack of the city. Menelaus is restored to his position as High Priest, and he helps Antiochus rob the temple of 1800 talents and other offerings. New officials are appointed to oversee the city, including an epistates named Philip. Another occupying army of Mysians, led by a commander named Apollonius, instigates a slaughter of Jews on the Sabbath when they are abstaining from labor (and presumably combat) via trickery. The chapter ends with a single sentence establishing that Judas Maccabeus and his initial band headed into the wilderness to avoid defilement and where Jewish law could be kept.

The author is intent on showing that God is in control of history in his theology. The attack on Jerusalem is explained as punishment for the Jerusalemites' own sins in 5:17-20, with Antiochus merely acting as an instrument for God's will.

The history found here largely matches what is described in 1 Maccabees, with two notable departures. 2 Maccabees offers a somewhat different motive to Antiochus, saying he was responding to Jason's coup; 1 Maccabees merely portrays him as an evil ruler who hated Jews. Also, 1 Maccabees places the attack on Jerusalem slightly earlier, after Antiochus's first expedition to Egypt in 170/169 BCE rather than after the second expedition in 168 BCE. By comparison, the historian Josephus implies he visited the city after both excursions, raiding the city in the first visit and the Temple in the second one. Scholars differ on which version is the most reliable between 2 Maccabees, 1 Maccabees, and Josephus. The detail that Antiochus personally entered the Jewish temple is corroborated in the non-Jewish history of Diodorus Siculus, suggesting that his profaning of the Temple was notable even to pagan audiences.

One historical possibility extracted from the text—against the intent of the author if so—is the hypothesis that another rebellion against Antiochus occurred, led not by Jason but rather by Jewish traditionalists. The scholar Victor Tcherikover is generally credited with raising this idea, on the basis that a mere dispute over which official held the position of High Priest would be unlikely to lead to the havoc described. Jason's conspiracy is described as "coming to a shameful end", but that end is not directly attributed to either Menelaus's allies or to Antiochus's invading army. While it is possible that this statement was merely out of chronological order as describing what would happen when Antiochus arrived to expel Jason, Tcherikover believes this third force was who defeated Jason. If they existed at all, directly acknowledging these earlier, unsuccessful rebels would be unpalatable for the authors of both books of Maccabees, hence explaining the lack of direct reference to scholars who favor the theory.

== Chapter 6 ==
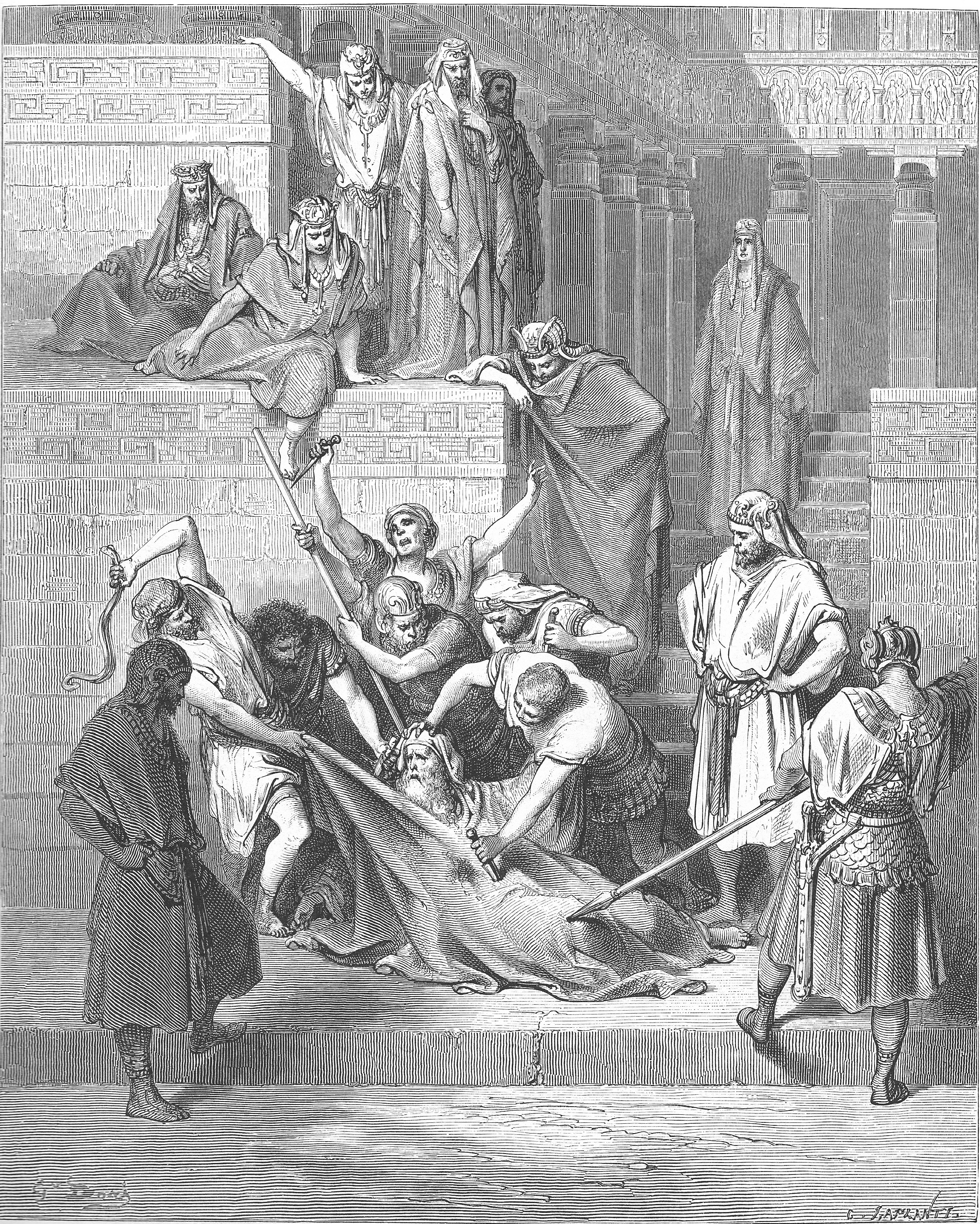
The martyrdom of Eleazar. 1866 illustration by Gustave Doré.

Now I urge those who read this book not to be depressed by such calamities, but to recognize that these punishments were designed not to destroy but to discipline our people. In fact, it is a sign of great kindness not to let the impious alone for long, but to punish them immediately.

— 2 Maccabees 6:12-13

The situation continues to deteriorate in Chapter 6. The king issues decrees forbidding the practice of traditional Judaism. He dispatches Geron the Athenian to enforce this. Geron adds the worship of Zeus to the Temple in Jerusalem in his role as Zeus Olympios (Zeus as King of the Gods), and to the Temple in Argarizin (that is, the Samaritan temple on Mount Gerizim) worship of Zeus Xenios (Zeus as patron of strangers and travelers). The altar of the temple was defiled, and Jews were forced to celebrate the festival of Dionysus. Horrific punishments are imposed on those who refuse. Women who circumcise their sons are flung from the city walls, and two men caught observing the Sabbath are burnt to death.

The narrative goes into some detail about the martyr Eleazar, described as a prominent scribe of advanced age. It seems a rule had been imposed for public performances of pork-eating, at least for prominent community members such as Eleazar. The Jews enforcing this edict arrange for validly prepared kosher meat to be available for him to eat instead, so that he might appear to comply and avoid punishment, while actually maintaining Jewish law. Eleazar declines the offer, however, saying he did not wish for the young to get the wrong impression and think he had abandoned the law. He is tortured to death and dies, but as an exemplar of virtue.

"Geron the Athenian" is only mentioned in the book of 2 Maccabees, and the phrasing is somewhat unclear; it could also be read as "the elderly Athenaeus". While Athens was not part of the Seleucid Empire, Antiochus IV had spent part of his life in exile there, where he presumably made friends and allies. As part of mainland Greece, it would have had legitimacy and prestige in the eyes of the ethnically Greek aristocrats of the Seleucid Empire, so sending an Athenian to oversee religious reforms is plausible.

In general, the historicity of the persecutions described in 2 Maccabees is uncontested. Various other sources agree a persecution happened (e.g. 1 Maccabees, Daniel, the Testament of Moses, Josephus, Tacitus, Diodorus), and 2 Maccabees is considered a valuable source of details. Antiochus banning circumcision and Sabbath observance makes sense, as these were the most well-known Jewish practices in pagan sources, and thus would have drawn his attention. One claim on the nature of the persecution that is contested is in verse 7, which says that Jews were forced to worship Dionysus as well as celebrate the king's birthday monthly. 1 Maccabees does write that monthly sacrifices were required, but the suspicion is that the Egyptian epitomist is attempting to explain these sacrifices using customs in Ptolemaic Egypt that they were familiar with. Monthly celebrations of the king's birthday were indeed a Ptolemaic custom, but are less well-attested in the wider Hellenistic world outside the mention here in 2 Maccabees; it is disputed whether this is merely due to evidence being lost or the epitomist erring. Similarly, while the cult of Dionysus was popular in Ptolemaic Egypt and among its rulers, the Seleucids considered Zeus their patron divinity. Records of Seleucid worship of Dionysus are rare and minor. To the extent Antiochus IV worshiped gods other than Zeus, Apollo seems to have been his favorite. While it is possible that Geron the Athenian brought worship of Dionysus from Athens, where Dionysus was also popular, the simpler explanation is that the compiler was unfamiliar that Dionysus was substantially more popular locally in Egypt than in the Seleucid Empire.

Martyrs are clearly revered by the author of 2 Maccabees, as befitting diaspora Judaism and later early Christianity where martyrdom was the highest display of devotion and loyalty possible. This differs from 1 Maccabees, which is substantially more dismissive of martyrs, considering them part of the problem. For 2 Maccabees, martyrs are a way of showing God that Jews are still loyal, and are ready to be reconciled with God. Eleazar can be compared in role to Mattathias in 1 Maccabees: an elderly man who makes a public stand against the Seleucids, whether by dying to uphold God's law as in this book, or via killing those who stand against him as Mattathias does in 1 Maccabees.

The scene has been compared to the death of Socrates as both being exemplars of Hellenistic ideals of a noble and proper death. Eleazar makes a final statement of his principles, as if he is a defendant at a trial and calling on God as a witness.

== Chapter 7 ==
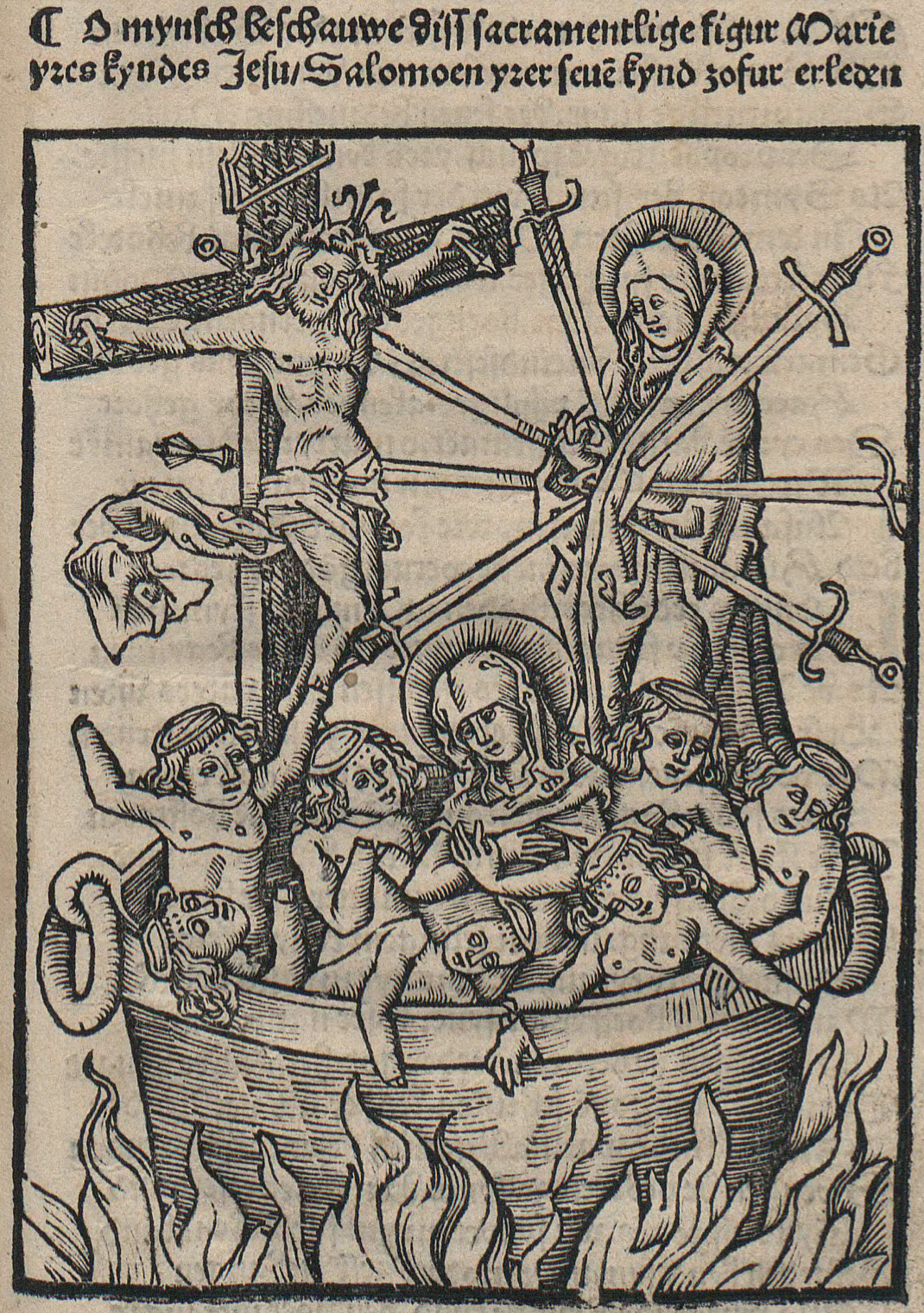
Christians considered the martyrs as prefiguring the death of Jesus. This 1517 German depiction shows the crucified Jesus present as the mother and her seven sons are roasted in the boiling cauldron.

We are ready to die rather than transgress the laws of our ancestors.

— 2 Maccabees 7:2

Antiochus IV personally oversees the torture of the woman and her seven sons, who had been arrested. The group are whipped and told to violate Jewish law by eating pork, which they refuse to do. A red-hot cauldron is prepared, and the first brother has his hands and feet cut off, before the rest of his body is thrown into the cauldron to be burned to death. The second, third, fourth, fifth, and sixth brother are similarly tortured; they are scalped and their limbs cut off before being thrown into the cauldron to burn to death, although not before they declare their devotion to God, declare that Antiochus and his descendants will suffer similarly, and say that God will resurrect them some day. The mother encourages her sons to continue to defy Antiochus during this. The youngest is saved for last; Antiochus encourages the mother to convince him at least to comply, but the pair continue in their defiance. Enraged, Antiochus treats the youngest worse than all the others, and the final son and the mother die.

Chapter 7, and the martyrdom of Eleazar that immediately precedes it, is easily the most famous section of 2 Maccabees, featuring in much later devotion, literature, art, and theology. It provided an archetype for both Jewish and Christian martyrs for centuries later who would stand by their beliefs even at the cost of their lives. Secondary versions have appeared in works such as 4 Maccabees or independent renditions in the Jewish midrashim. Eleazar said that he would not want to provide a poor example to the youth by appearing to comply with the decrees; this chapter is an immediate "answer" to this statement, showing the youth remaining firm in their Judaism despite the threat of awful torture. The inclusion of the mother shows that martyrdom was available not merely to the young and old, but also both sexes. It functions as a fulcrum of the dramatic structure of the book: while before God was punishing the Jews, after the resoluteness of the martyrs, the Jews are now reconciled with God, and God will switch to aiding the Jews in reclaiming their religion, as he had before in the story of Heliodorus and the Temple in Chapter 3.

Similar to the epitomist's comment in Chapter 6 that God is showing mercy to Jews by punishing them briefly and sharply for straying, the youngest son says as much directly: that "if our living Lord is angry for a little while, to rebuke and discipline us, he will again be reconciled with his own servants." It again emphasizes the view of the epitomist that God controls the world and even the sufferings of Jews are his will, with Antiochus only serving as God's instrument. The attitude of the epitomist toward Antiochus, while obviously hostile, is complex. The epitomist describes Antiochus more as enraged and in thrall to his emotions, rather than being cold-blooded in his evil. While the brothers threaten Antiochus with future tortures imposed by God as punishment for his impious actions, the youngest brother also expresses a wish that Antiochus will some day, after suffering his own afflictions imposed as divine punishment, confess that the Jewish god alone is God.

The chapter is one of the earliest pieces of Jewish literature to directly suggest a future resurrection of righteous individuals. The Book of Isaiah discussed the resurrection of the "suffering servant" before and was an influential precursor, although this was often taken as a reference to the resurrection of the nation of Israel as an entity at the time. 2 Maccabees as well as the Book of Daniel reframe resurrection on a more personal level: the righteous, even if they suffer during the persecution, will be brought back by God, and their unjust deaths reversed. This was likely a way to update the Deuteronomist view of history, which suggested the righteous would be rewarded and the wicked punished; a future resurrection would ensure that the righteous would eventually be properly justified, even if delayed.

A less important and possibly unintended theological issue is that the mother tells her remaining son that God did not make the heavens and the earth "out of things that existed". In context, the intent is to show that all life comes from and returns to God; some later Christian theologians cited the passage as backing for the doctrine of creatio ex nihilo, the stance that God created the entire universe.

While the basic historicity of martyrs being killed during the persecution is uncontested, the details of the story are not considered likely to be particularly accurate. Antiochus probably did not personally oversee tortures nor engage in conversation with those about to be tortured, and even if he had, then the dialogue recorded was surely improved to be more eloquent, as was common with histories of the era that would routinely invent appropriate dialogue for a scene. Having the king feature directly rather than some lackey executing the king's will is typical of such stories as well, to better emphasize his culpability. The details may be a callback to Jeremiah 15:9, which mentions the death of a woman who bore seven children.

== Chapter 8 ==
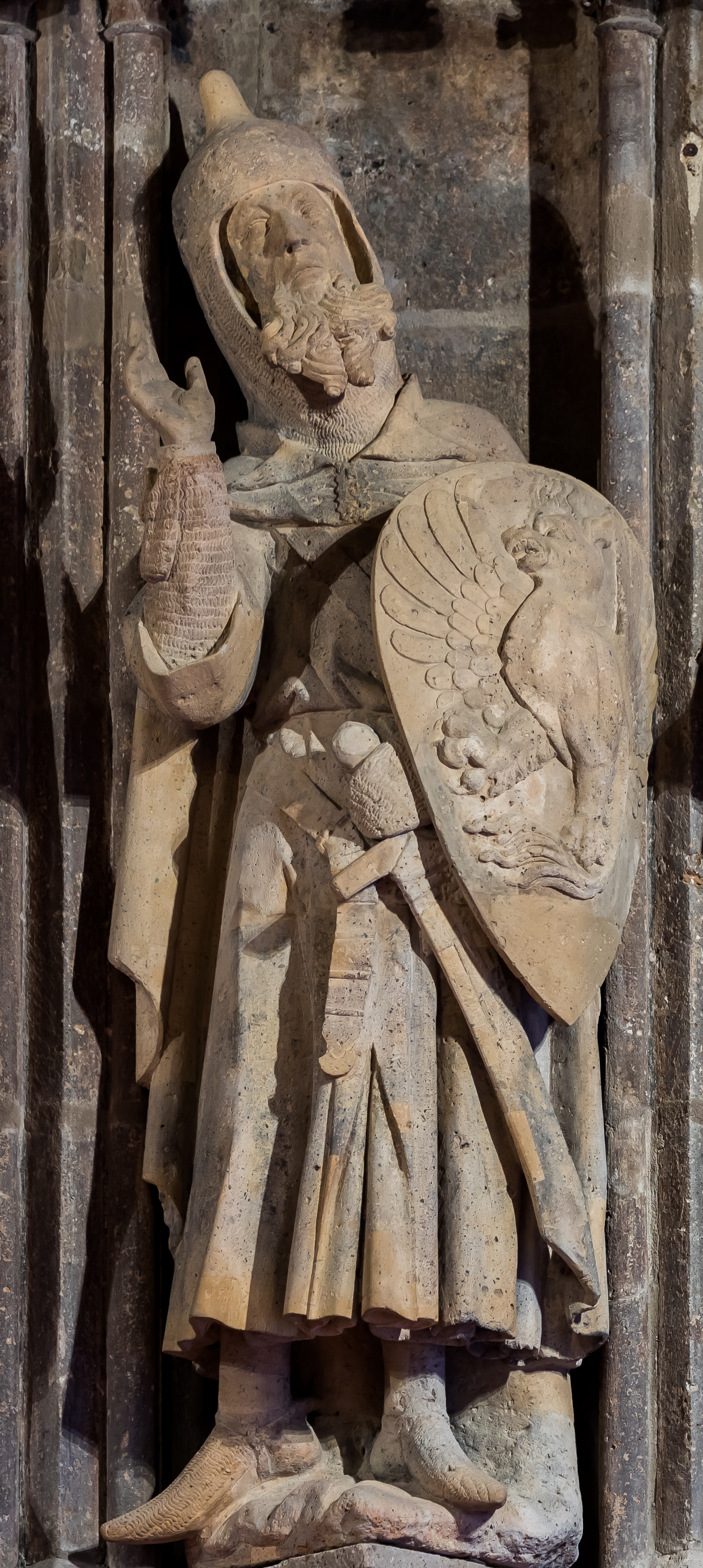
A medieval statue of Judas Maccabeus as one of the Nine Worthies in Cologne, Germany.

As soon as Maccabeus got his army organized, the Gentiles could not withstand him, for the wrath of the Lord had turned to mercy. Coming without warning, he would set fire to towns and villages. He captured strategic positions and put to flight not a few of the enemy. He found the nights most advantageous for such attacks. And talk of his valor spread everywhere.

— 2 Maccabees 8:5-7

This is the first chapter in the book that describes the military struggle against the Seleucids led by Judas Maccabeus. Judas forms an army out of hatred of evil, backed by the will of God. Philip, the Seleucid governor of Jerusalem, asks for reinforcements to defeat Judas's army. Seleucid generals Nicanor and Gorgias respond and lead an expedition to attack Judea. They also seek to enslave Jews, sell them, and use the funds to pay off the debt owed to the Romans (presumably a reference to the tribute required by the Treaty of Apamea). Before the battle with Nicanor, Judas gives a speech where he cites other cases of God enabling smaller forces to triumph over larger ones. He cites a battle in the era of Sennacherib where 185,000 soldiers fell, along with a story of a battle in Babylonia against Galatians where 6,000 soldiers defeated 120,000 Galatians, each soldier killing 20 people. Judas and his brothers form into four divisions and cut down 9,000 Seleucid soldiers during the battle (presumably a reference to the Battle of Emmaus in 165 BCE). The only reason the rout is not more complete is that it is the day before the Sabbath, and the Jews do not wish to continue their pursuit into the day of rest. They ironically take treasure from those who had come to enslave Jews for money, and distribute the first portion as charity to the mistreated, widows, and orphans before splitting the rest among themselves. Nicanor retreats to Antioch, humiliated.

The focus of the book differs from the same events related in 1 Maccabees; it relegates the details of the fighting to a few short verses, and instead fills out the text with more religious matters, such as a speech citing biblical precedent, a reading of the Torah prior to battle, and the distribution of charity after the battle. It also notably includes no mention of Mattathias, the father of Judas. 1 Maccabees was interested in building up the Hasmonean dynasty, which makes Mattathias important as its patriarch; 2 Maccabees has little interest in dynastic politics and does not mention him at all. The author smooths over the fact that Judas was probably fighting fellow Jews early in the revolt by not being clear on who exactly he was attacking or what towns he was setting fire to. 1 Maccabees calls the foes Judas fought early "sinners", "lawless", and "impious", suggesting he was fighting hostile Jews considered insufficiently traditionalist to the Maccabees. Also, 2 Maccabees places the focus on Nicanor at the Battle of Emmaus; Nicanor plays a major role as an antagonist throughout 2 Maccabees. 1 Maccabees discusses the role of Gorgias more for this battle. The claim of 9,000 soldiers being defeated is presumed to be an exaggeration, a technique that the author repeatedly uses throughout the military history portion of the story, which routinely feature much larger enemy casualty counts than 1 Maccabees. Ancient authors of all nationalities routinely exaggerated the size of enemy armies in their work for rhetorical effect.

The author directly shows God answering the prayer of the mother and her seven sons in 7:38, writing that as they had hoped, God's anger at the Jews has turned to mercy (8:5). With God's aid, Judas will defeat all in his path no matter the odds.

A person named Ptolemy is mentioned in verse 8 as the governor of Coele-Syria and Phoenicia, probably the same person as Ptolemy Macron mentioned in 10:12-13. There was also a "Ptolemy son of Dorymenes" mentioned in 4:45 and 1 Maccabees 3:38; it is disputed whether those are different names for the same person or two separate people.

Judas mentions earlier battles in his speech; the allusion to Sennacherib is a reference to the Assyrian siege of Jerusalem, mentioned in both 2 Kings 19 and Isaiah 37. It is unknown what battle is being referred to in Judas's speech about an earlier fight against Galatians in Babylonia, if there is any historical precedent for it at all. Galatians were concentrated in Asia Minor (modern Anatolia), so it is not obvious what they would have been doing in Babylonia—serving as mercenaries? Part of a past Seleucid civil war? Galatians had a reputation as hardy fighters in the era, so defeating them (by some Jewish army that had also ended up in Babylonia? By noble Gentiles?) would have been an impressive feat, even if the claim of precisely 20 enemies killed by each soldier seems more numerological than historical.

Verses 30-33 are a story of how soldiers under Timothy and Bacchides were killed, along with Timothy's phylarch (literally "tribal leader", although perhaps meaning more a subcommander here). (Note: A variant reading of the text is that the author meant that Timothy himself died, and Timothy was also a phylarch. Other possible readings exist as well, if it is assumed a confused scribe made a transcription error at some point.) Timothy is forced into a humiliating retreat similar to Nicanor's retreat. This is before Timothy has been introduced into the narrative; it seems to have been placed here because of the similar division of spoils and weapons as to the story of Emmaus, or because the author saw Timothy's fate as similar to Nicanor and a useful way to emphasize the point. It is probably a "flash-forward" to the events described in Chapter 12 and should not be taken as happening directly after Emmaus, despite the mention in Chapter 9. It is contested by scholars whether there is one Timothy or two. Bezalel Bar-Kochva argues there is just a single Timothy; Jonathan Goldstein argues that the Timothy in Chapter 8 and 12 is one person, while the one slain at Gazara in Chapter 10 is separate; Robert Doran argues there are two Timothys in the text of 2 Maccabees but does not opine on which one is referred to by Chapter 8.

A person named Bacchides is mentioned as working with Timothy. This was a reasonably common name in the era, so it is unclear if this Bacchides is the same Bacchides mentioned in 1 Maccabees.

== Chapter 9 ==
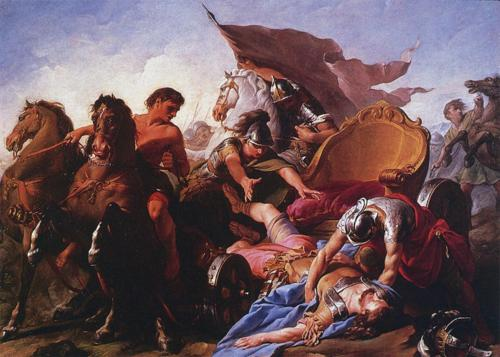
Antiochus Falling from His Chariot, an 18th-century work by Noël Hallé.

So the murderer and blasphemer, having endured the more intense suffering, such as he had inflicted on others, came to the end of his life by a most pitiable fate, among the mountains in a strange land.

— 2 Maccabees 9:28

The ninth chapter discusses the death of Antiochus IV Epiphanes, gleefully detailing his defeats, illness, and suffering as a form of divine punishment. He is defeated by a Persian mob while attempting to rob another temple in Persepolis and forced into a shameful retreat. While in Ecbatana, Antiochus hears the bad news of Nicanor's defeat at Emmaus, and resolves to punish the Jews. He is struck by divine disease of the entrails after blaspheming a threat to turn Jerusalem into a vast Jewish cemetery. Further calamities befall him: he falls out of a chariot and suffers massive injuries; worms crawl out of his eyes; and his flesh disintegrates while he is still alive, creating an awful stench. Antiochus repents and vows to set Jerusalem free, raise the Jews to the status of Greeks, restore the plundered treasures of the Temple, and to become a Jew himself. He writes a letter to the Jews guaranteeing their rights and privileges. He then dies, in a foreign land amid the mountains. His assistant Philip takes the body back to Syria, but then flees to Ptolemaic Egypt.

The basic historicity of what is described is plausible enough: that Antiochus went on a campaign in the east, was involved in the plunder of a temple, became sick, and died. Non-Jewish sources confirm these elements. Additionally, historians generally agree with the timing implied in 2 Maccabees of Antiochus's death occurring before the cleansing of the temple, which archaeological evidence seems to support, against the chronology given in 1 Maccabees of this happening afterward. The specific details and quotes are generally assumed to be literary rather than historical, however. The section where Antiochus writes a deathbed epistle granting rights to the Jews is considered very unlikely to be historical, as it is exactly what Jews of the era would most want to fabricate—a document declaring that their rights and privileges were protected by royal decree. The reference to Persepolis may also be muddled or in error, as Greek sources do not connect Persepolis with the expedition. Persepolis had been looted and mostly destroyed by Alexander the Great centuries earlier, leading to the question of if there was anything still worth taking in the ruins. Additionally, Persepolis is hundreds of kilometers away from Elymais, where Antiochus is usually thought to have done his looting. It may have been the author choosing a famous Persian city if he knew Antiochus was in Persia without further details, or a scribal error where "Persis" was misread as a city rather than a region. Ecbatana, the capital of Media, is closer to Elymais, though, and thus considered more likely to be historical.

The genre of detailing the sorrows and demises of villains who thought they could defy God would continue in later works, with Chapter 9 one of the earliest (or even first) examples. De mortibus persecutorum is a famous Christian example of the genre from the 4th century. Having worms afflict an evil ruler became a common motif in the genre among writers of all religions: Sulla (by a pagan source, Plutarch), Queen Pheretima of Cyrene (by a pagan source, Herodotus, but perhaps known to Jason of Cyrene), Herod the Great (by a Jewish source, Josephus), Herod Agrippa (by a Christian source, the Book of Acts), and others are all described as suffering from worms on their way to a miserable end. Among precedents in Hebrew scripture, Isaiah 14 mentions that the villainous King of Babylon will be infested by worms, albeit after he is already dead. The reference to a disease of the entrails may be a reference to King Jehoram of Judah, another evil tyrant struck by divine disease, although it may also be a roundabout reference to the martyrs in Chapter 7—that forcing Jews to eat pork would corrupt their entrails, so it is fair for Antiochus's own entrails to be corrupted.

Jonathan Goldstein argues that the epitomist adjusted the account to attempt to support the Book of Daniel's prophecy where he could. The Book of Daniel describes the King of the North's end in 11:44-45: "...he shall go out with great fury to bring ruin and complete destruction to many. He shall pitch his palatial tents between the sea and the beautiful holy mountain. Yet he shall come to his end, with no one to help him." The epitomist depicts Antiochus as a person in thrall to his emotions, with a similar "great fury" in 9:4, and that the stench of his decaying flesh had repelled even his retainers, leaving him alone. Additionally, Antiochus's acknowledgment of the power of God mirrors Daniel's depictions of various kings, even antagonistic ones, being ultimately forced to admit God's superior sovereignty.

Antiochus's death fulfills the prediction made by the youngest brother of the martyrs in 7:35-37, that Antiochus would suffer just punishment for his arrogance, and that trials and plagues would make him confess the power of the Jewish God.

== Chapter 10 ==
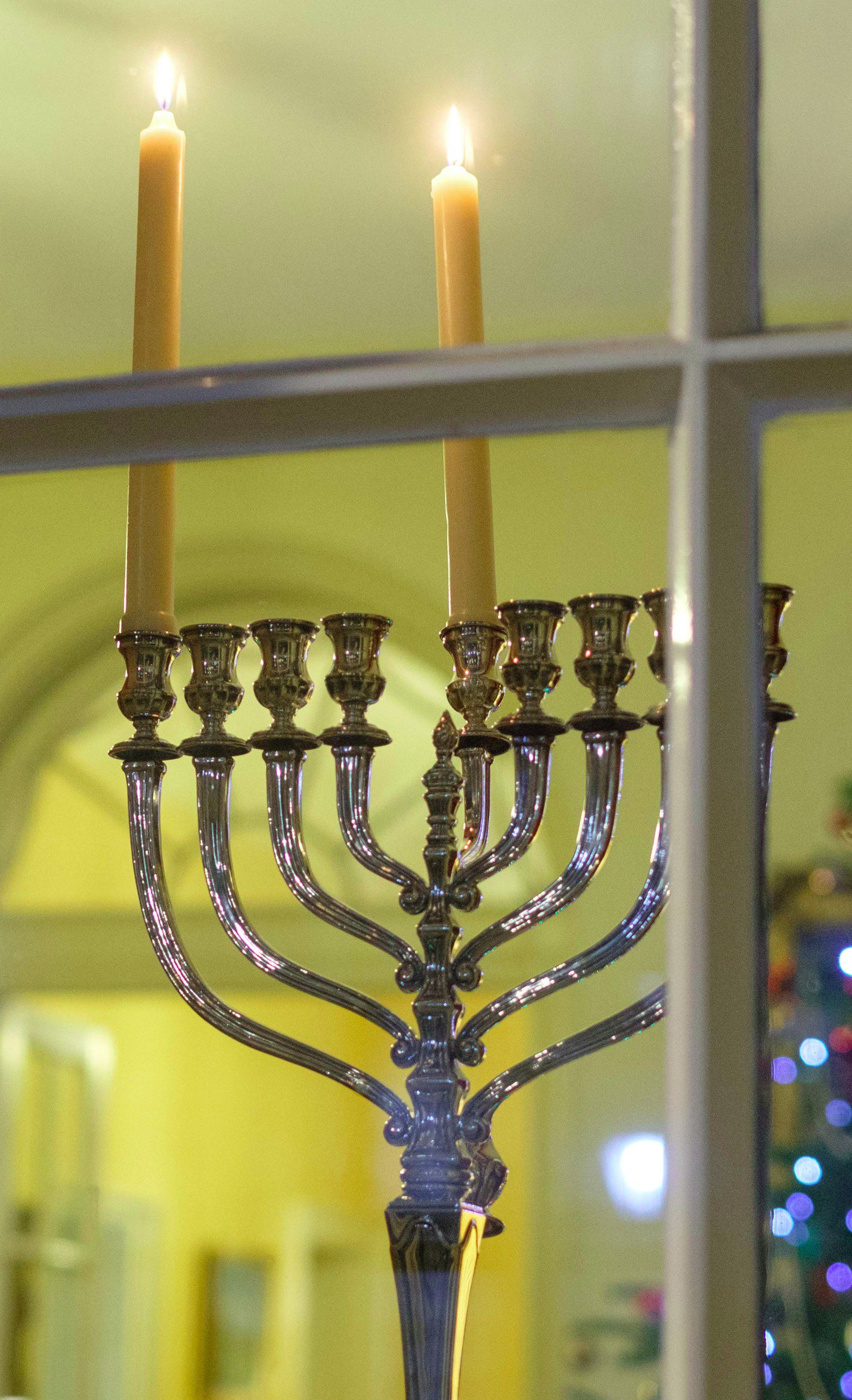
A lit menorah or Hanukiah. The cleansing of the temple would be commemorated later as the festival of Hanukkah.

...the purification of the sanctuary took place, that is, on the twenty-fifth day of the same month, which was Chislev. They celebrated it for eight days with rejoicing, in the manner of the festival of booths… They decreed by public edict, ratified by vote, that the whole nation of the Jews should observe these days every year.

— 2 Maccabees 10:5-6; 8

Chapter 10 opens with the purification of the Temple by Judas Maccabeus after he takes control of Jerusalem. This would be the origin of what is now called the festival of Hanukkah, an eight-day celebration of the reclamation of the Temple. Returning to Seleucid politics, Antiochus's young son Antiochus V Eupator is now king, and Lysias is appointed regent. Governor Ptolemy Macron (a former Ptolemaic official who defected and handed over Cyprus to the Seleucids in the Sixth Syrian War) tries to mend relationships with the Jews, but he is accused and undermined by the king's philoi ("friends"), and forced to commit suicide. He is replaced by Gorgias, who is hostile to the Jews, and hires mercenaries to attack them. The Jews also struggle with the Idumaeans to the south. Judas leads an expedition to attack them and defeats them, killing over 20,000 Idumeans. The struggle is interrupted by some Jewish commanders who take payments to allow some Idumeans to escape; when Judas discovers this, he orders the Jews executed as traitors, then conquers two towers held by the Idumeans and kills another 20,000 of them. Judas then fights a commander named Timothy (possibly Timothy of Ammon?) who invades Judea, backed by foreign mercenaries. Judas's force defeats him in battle, aided by five heavenly cavalrymen with golden horse bridles. 20,500 enemy soldiers and 600 cavalrymen are slain. Timothy retreats to the stronghold of Gazara (Gezer?). Judas's army besieges Gazara. After five days, some Jewish youths distract the defenders with a direct assault, which allows other soldiers to climb the walls, set fire to the towers, and open the gate for a Jewish assault. Timothy is found hiding and is slain, as well as two commanders named Chaereas and Apollophanes. The Jews sing hymns of gratitude to God for granting them the victory.

The chapter is vague in its chronology and does not directly specify dates for the events it describes. Antiochus IV Epiphanes died in late 164 BCE. When exactly the battles described afterward occurred is unclear, although they seem likely to be part of the Maccabee campaigns of 163 BCE. Another chronology issue is that verses 2-3 seem to indicate that sacrifices had stopped at the temple for a period of two years before Judas reinstated them. If that is what is meant, it goes against 1 Maccabees and Josephus, which seem to indicate that sacrifices were paused for a period of three or three and a half years.

The somewhat vague account of the re-lighting of the temple fire is likely due to Jewish belief and expectation that the altar fire would be somehow blessed, and should ideally come directly from God himself. Leviticus 10 describes Nadab and Abihu being incinerated by God for improperly lighting fire for a sacrifice as an example of how serious this was. The passage is somewhat unclear, with a literal reading being of "igniting rocks", but seems to hint at sparks flying from stones to re-light the fire to add the expected miraculous element. The second letter to the Jews of Egypt in Chapter 2 expands on the theology of this re-lighting.

The chapter includes an unusual amount of military history for the book, discussing battles and troop movements. However, as per the habit of the epitomist, these accounts are bracketed with prayers, and there is a divine intervention. As throughout the volume, the casualty counts are considered wildly exaggerated. It is unclear what exact role Gorgias played in the struggle; 1 Maccabees places him in the coastal Greek towns of the time, rather than Idumea. The mention of the hated Gorgias could be part of the diasporan author's tendency to explain Jewish struggles with Gentiles as the result of malicious leaders. The Timothy here is described as leading an invasion of Judea, and Gezer is indeed in western Judea near the coastal plain. Such an invasion is not described in any other source, notably not appearing in 1 Maccabees which is eager to celebrate Judas's victories. 1 Maccabees does chronicle a campaign against a commander named Timothy in Ammon, including a battle at a fortress named Jazer (albeit not one where Timothy is described as dying). Several scholars believe that this story is in fact a distorted retelling of the campaign in Ammon: either the diasporan author did not recognize Jazer and replaced it with Gezer, a translation error in moving from Hebrew to Greek caused similar confusion, or that he intentionally moved the Maccabee invasion of Ammon into a more defensive and dramatic defense of Judea against an invasion. It is also possible that both accounts are correct, and the issue is more of 2 Maccabees describing events out-of-order. A similar issue is raised with the fact that Timothy is described as dying, despite appearing in Chapter 12; whether this is out-of-order sequencing of events, two separate Timothys, or an outright error is not easily resolved.

Among scholars who argue that the book of 2 Maccabees was written as a response to 1 Maccabees or by a Pharisee enemy of the Hasmonean dynasty, the story in Idumea, where Simon Thassi's men take an astronomical bribe (70,000 drachmas was gigantic in the era), Judas returns, executes the leaders that took the bribe, then conquers the towers himself, is cited as evidence. Other scholars disagree that this was meant as an implicit criticism of Simon (and by extension, his descendants that ruled the Hasmonean kingdom) and just see the passage as glorifying Judas. Regardless of whether the account was intended to smear Simon or not, it is consistent with the epitomist's overall view of Judas as an unstoppable commander. His setbacks are always due to malfeasance from others.

== Chapter 11 ==
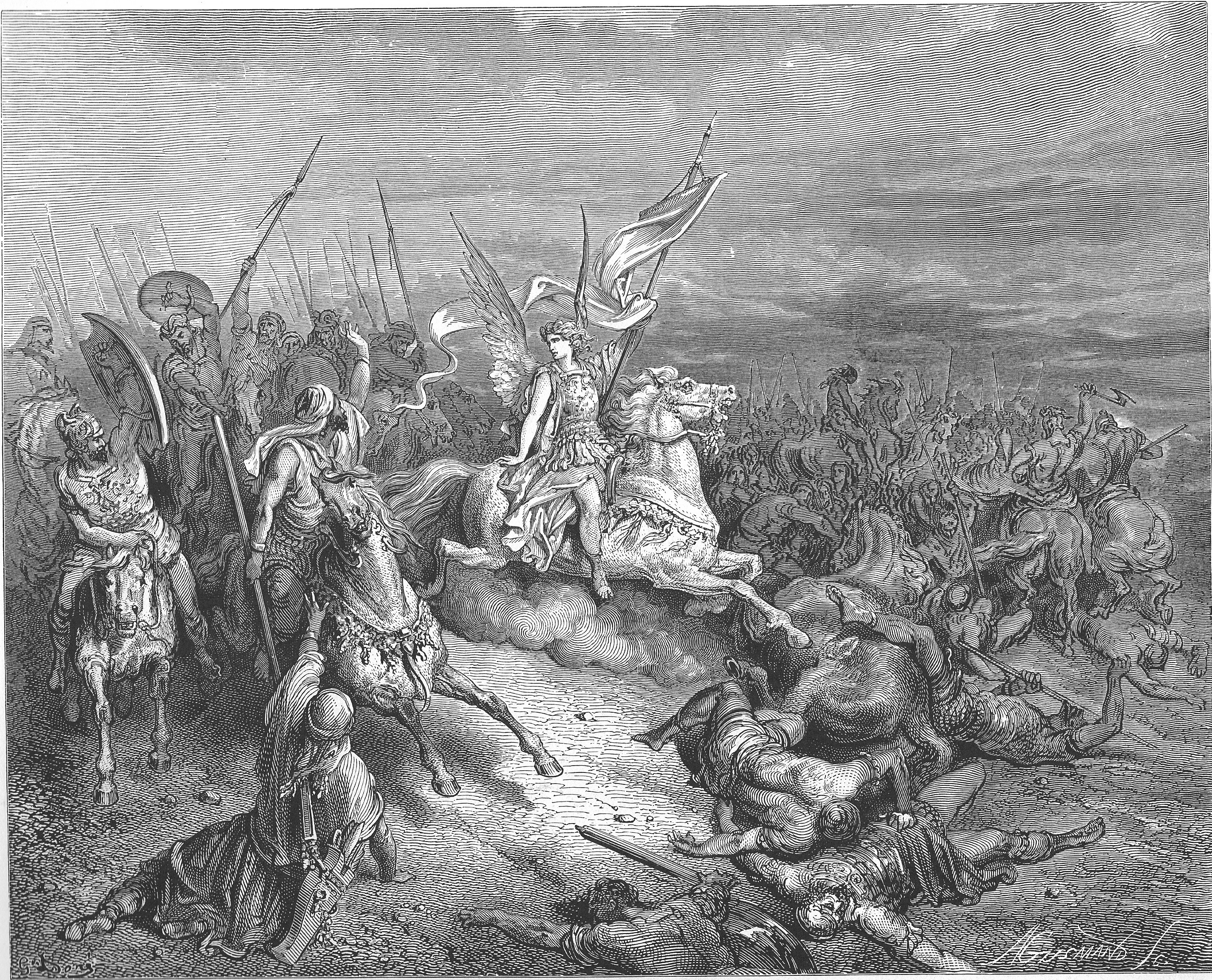
An angel aids the Maccabees at the Battle of Beth-Zur. Illustration by Gustave Doré in 1866.

Maccabeus, having regard for the common good, agreed to all that Lysias urged. For the king granted every request in behalf of the Jews which Maccabeus delivered to Lysias in writing.

— 2 Maccabees 11:15

Chapter 11 describes an expedition to Judea led by the regent Lysias, the guardian of young king Antiochus V. Lysias leads an army of 80,000 men, all of his cavalry, and 80 war elephants to restore Seleucid control of Jerusalem. Judas and the Jews pray to God for deliverance and for him to send an angel to defend Israel. A mysterious horseman in white garments and golden weapons appears near Jerusalem to aid Judas's army. The Battle of Beth-Zur results; the Maccabees and their heavenly ally win a resounding victory, killing 11,000 soldiers and 1,600 cavalrymen. Lysias and his expedition are forced to shamefully retreat. Lysias realizes that the Judeans are invincible, and negotiates to end hostilities. Several documents are then provided of negotiations conducted by the Jews in this period after Lysias's defeat. They show promises to end Antiochus IV's decrees forbidding traditional Jewish practices and the offer of a conditional amnesty. The final document is of negotiations with the Roman Republic for a possible alliance.

The expedition by Lysias to Judea after the cleansing of the Temple in this chapter is possibly the same expedition that is described in Chapter 13. In contrast, 1 Maccabees includes two separate expeditions by Lysias that both stop by Beth-Zur, but one before the cleansing of the Temple in 164 BCE, and the other is after the cleansing of the Temple in 162 BCE. It is disputed whether the epitomist is claiming there was only one expedition; that he thought that there were two expeditions but that both took place after the cleansing of the Temple; that there is out-of-order sequencing going on where this passage describes the pre-cleansing campaign despite being placed later; or that the epitomist simply made mistakes and conflated separate events across both campaigns into one narrative. The mention of 80 war elephants matches what Josephus said of Lysias's second expedition, suggesting that this account is perhaps mostly based on the second expedition. However, several of the later documents make more sense for happening after the first expedition.

As usual, the depiction of the battle at Beth-Zur is not given much credence, and the troop numbers are wildly exaggerated—feeding such a gigantic group would have been impossible. Daniel R. Schwartz suggests that Chapters 10 and 11 might have come from some secondary source other than Jason of Cyrene's history, explaining why they seemingly duplicate material seen elsewhere.

The letters are considered to be genuine and among the most useful parts of 2 Maccabees to historians. They match the style of what such negotiations would be, including phrases seen by other Hellenistic kings in their correspondences. They also include several "admissions against interest" that suggest the epitomist included even aspects that might be seen as embarrassing to his message. For example, the third document credits Menelaus with also appealing for a conditional amnesty. As the epitomist clearly thinks of Menelaus as an evil villain, the most likely reason to include a passage of even Menelaus pleading for the Jews would presumably be out of respect for accuracy. The fourth document is also one of the earliest pieces of evidence for Roman intervention in Seleucid affairs. The historian Polybius describes in his Histories how the Roman Senate sought to make the Seleucid government weak and compliant, and Rome encouraging splinter groups with promises fits what is known of Roman foreign policy in the period.

The four documents in this chapter do not appear to be in chronological order. The first, third, and fourth documents are dated to 148 SE, equivalent to Fall 165 BCE–Fall 164 BCE. The months, however, have been contested as possibly confusion between the Attic calendar months and the Ancient Macedonian calendar months. Notably, the first document references an otherwise unknown month of "Dios Corinthos" (a renamed month of Dios?), and the third and fourth document have identical dates, suggesting the possibility of an early scribal error by a copyist of the document incorrectly writing the same date twice. The second document is undated but is on Antiochus V's behalf, suggesting a date of 163–161 BCE. Various reconstructions of the dates have been made. (Note: Suggested orders of the documents include: Bezalel Bar-Kochva and Victor Tcherikover: 1, 4, 3, 2; Christian Habicht and Lester L. Grabbe: 3, 1, 4, 2; Klaus Bringmann: 1, 3, 4, 2.)

== Chapter 12 ==
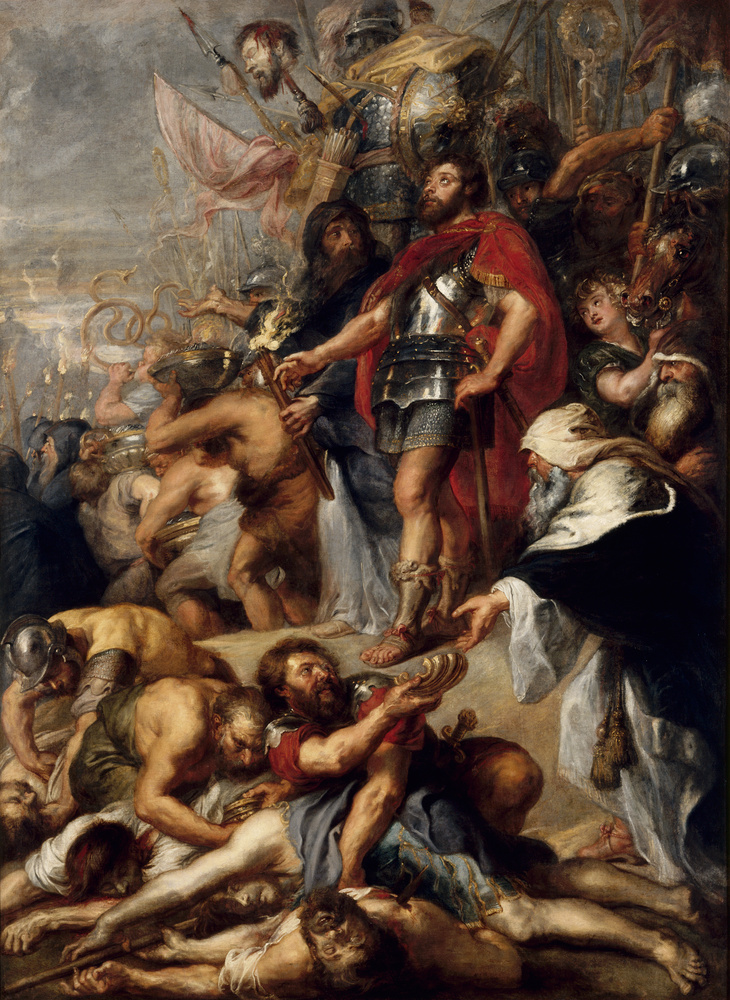
A mid-1630s work by Peter Paul Rubens. After a campaign in Idumea, some Jews fell against Gorgias's forces; these Jews died because they had idols on them. Judas makes a sin offering in recompense. This offering would become cited in the 1400s and 1500s as a defense of Catholic doctrine on purgatory and indulgences.

Therefore he made atonement for the dead, so that they might be delivered from their sin.

— 2 Maccabees 12:45

Chapter 12 discusses struggles between the Jews and their neighbors in the greater Palestine region. The coastal city of Joppa lures local Jews onto boats, then sink them, killing 200 people. Judas infiltrates the city at night, sets fire to the port and its boats, and kills some locals to take revenge for the atrocity. He then burns the boats at Jamnia too as a reprisal for a similar anti-Jewish incident. Judas fights a commander named Timothy who has an army of Arabs (Nabateans). After defeating them, Judas makes an informal treaty with the Arabs for them to provide cattle. Judas next attacks the city of Caspin (modern Haspin?). With God's aid, he takes the city and slaughters the inhabitants. Judas next sets out for lands controlled by the Tobiad Jews in Ammon. Timothy's local fortresses are conquered by Judas's men. Timothy himself encamps at the city Karnion with a gigantic army of 120,000 infantry and 2,500 cavalry; however, God's power makes them flee and stumble into each other, wounding themselves with their own swords. Judas's forces kill 30,000 fleeing soldiers of Timothy, and Timothy is himself captured. However, he is paroled in exchange for promises to release Jewish hostages. After capturing Karnion, Judas's forces cut down 25,000 corpses at the Temple of Atergatis (a Syrian version of the goddess Astarte, and a loose analogue to Artemis in Hellenistic culture), presumably a reference to fleeing civilians killed while seeking refuge in the temple. Judas then attacks the city of Ephron, takes it, and kills 25,000 inhabitants. He next moves to Scythopolis, but the Jews there testify that they are well-treated by the inhabitants. Judas's men thank them and peaceably proceed back to Jerusalem in time for the Festival of Weeks, also known as Pentecost in Greek.

After the festival is finished, the Maccabees fight Gorgias in Idumea, who has an army of 3,000 soldiers and 400 cavalry. While the Maccabees eventually win thanks to Judas's prayer and intervention, some of their soldiers die in the fight. The Maccabees first ritually purify themselves after coming into contact with dead bodies. Upon investigation, it is found that all of the dead soldiers had forbidden idols looted from Jamnia in their tunics (rather than destroying them as they should have), and this was the reason God had allowed them to fall. Judas takes up a sin offering for the fallen from his men of around 2,000 silver drachmas, which is donated in Jerusalem. The chapter closes by stating that prayers for the dead are still useful due to the coming resurrection.

The narrative mostly mirrors the version of these events told in 1 Maccabees 5. There are a few differences, however. The raids on Joppa and Jamnia are unique to this version, and not considered particularly historically plausible as they were fortified towns. Some sort of Jewish pogrom is plausible, but a raid that somehow penetrated the port without also conquering the town is considered unlikely. They do, however, fit the epitomist's diasporan Jewish perspective of how the Jews only wanted peace, and only engaged outside their territory out of necessity to punish evil and perfidy. This reciprocity is emphasized by the differing treatment Judas gives to the cities of Caspin and Ephron (which are destroyed) against the city of Scythopolis and the Arabs (which are allowed to continue on in peace). Another notable difference was the explanation for why some Jewish soldiers died in the fighting in Idumea. For the epitomist, it was because of theological impropriety and idols; for the author of 1 Maccabees, it was that they were not led by Hasmoneans. This book also has Judas involved in the fight against Gorgias from the start, while in 1 Maccabees it was managed by others at first. This account also omits the story of Simon's campaign in western Galilee.

One minor shift in the narrative suggested by Daniel Schwartz and others is that the story in verses 17-19 of visiting the land of the Tobiads in Ammon would make more sense to chronologically come in between verses 1-9 (fighting in coastal cities) and verses 10-12 (a brief battle and then peace with some Arabs), which makes the geography of the travels line up better. Robert Doran suggests that the epitomist might have rearranged the stories to better provide moral parallels; Bezalel Bar-Kochva, more skeptically, proposes that the epitomist was simply in error and unreliable due to their unfamiliarity with the geography of the region.

A commander named Timothy appears again in this chapter; per the earlier chapters, scholars disagree on whether this Timothy should be identified as the same as all, some, or none of the other references to a Seleucid official named Timothy.

The insistence on the importance of the resurrection suggests that the matter may have been a relevant theological dispute in the era. According to both Josephus and Acts 23, Sadducees denied resurrection, while Pharisees supported it. The passages discussing the resurrection here, as well as in the martyrs, has caused some scholars to see 2 Maccabees as a Pharisaic work, or at least influenced by them; other scholars doubt this, however, and suggest that Jewish belief in the resurrection was wider than just the Pharisees.

The Catholic practice of prayers for the dead cites the story as scriptural backing. It seems that a theological difference in the era was whether the fates of the dead were entirely sealed or could be modified after their death; 2 Maccabees, as well as 1 Corinthians 15 and The Passion of Saints Perpetua and Felicity, believe they can be, while the Book of Enoch and the Gospel of Luke suggest that they cannot be. More controversially, Judas's sin offering would be cited as an example of the efficacy of monetary indulgences paid to the Catholic Church in the 15th and 16th centuries. The practice of selling indulgences, among other factors, provoked Martin Luther and other reformers into the Protestant Reformation. Luther decried the practice and sought to banish 2 Maccabees, and other deuterocanonical works, into non-canonical Apocrypha.

== Chapter 13 ==
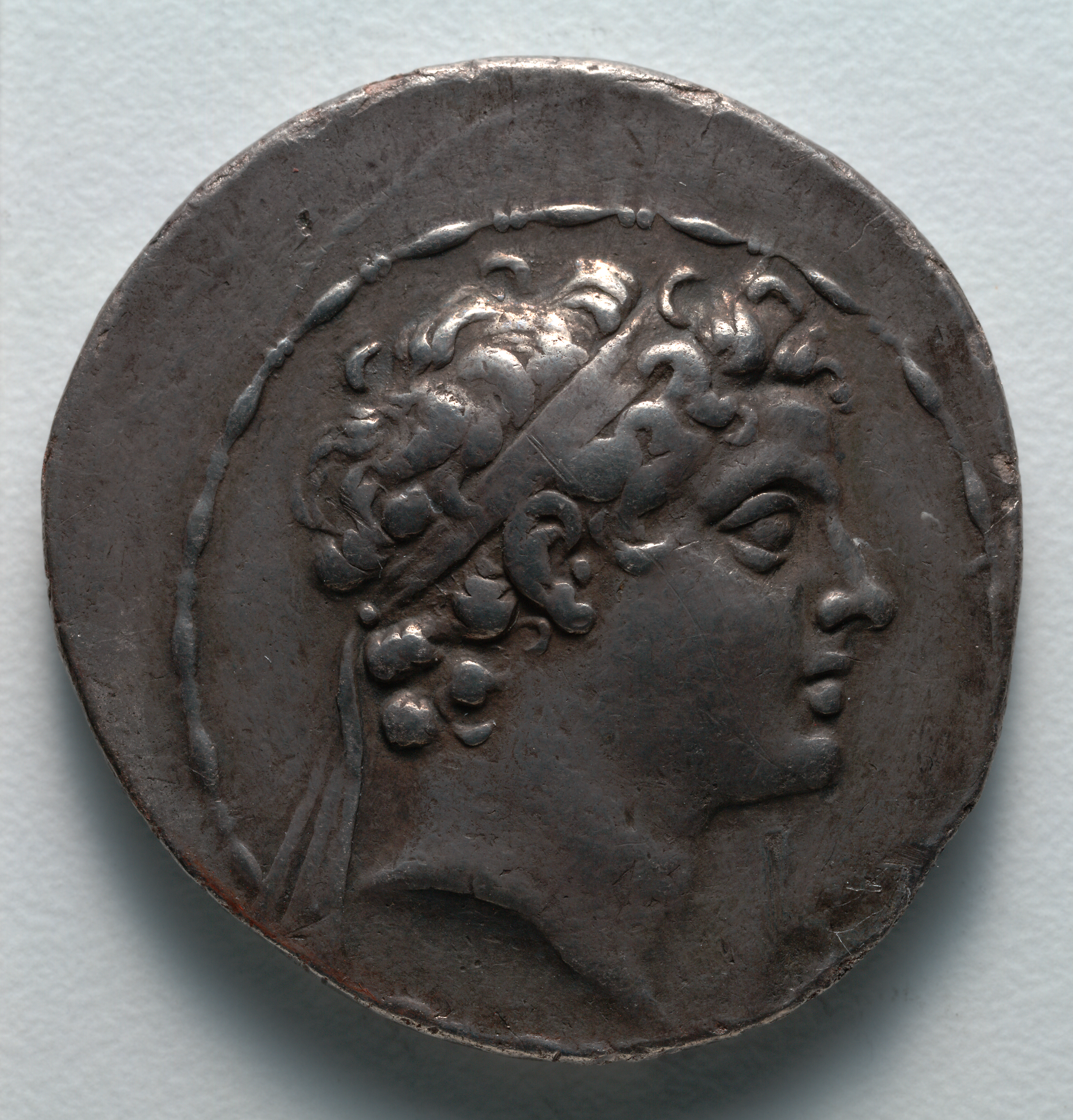
Face side of a coin of Antiochus V, the child-king of the Seleucid Empire from 164–162 BCE.

[Lysias] got word that Philip, who had been left in charge of the government, had revolted in Antioch; he was dismayed, called in the Jews, yielded and swore to observe all their rights, settled with them and offered sacrifice, honored the sanctuary, and showed generosity to the holy place.

— 2 Maccabees 13:23

High Priest Menelaus has worn out Lysias's patience and earned the condemnation of God. Lysias and Eupator arrange for his execution at Beroea (modern Aleppo) by tipping him into a tower filled with ashes, such that his body will not find rest in the earth. Lysias launches an expedition in Judea on behalf of the young King Antiochus V Eupator, backed by a gigantic force of 110,000 infantry, 5,300 cavalry, 22 war elephants, and 300 scythed chariots. Camping near Modein, Judas leads a "picked force" on a daring early morning raid, attacking and killing 2,000 men of the Seleucid force, as well as an elephant and rider, before retreating. Lysias attacks more carefully, this time near Beth-Zur, and is forced to retreat after several inconclusive battles. A Jewish traitor named Rhodocus is exposed as a spy and imprisoned. Lysias receives word that Philip, a political rival back in the capital Antioch, has disavowed Lysias's authority and revolted. He hurriedly moves to make peace with the Jews so that he can return and address the problem, and gives the temple its proper honor. A new governor is appointed over the region; the citizens of Ptolemais are deeply unhappy with the treaty, but Lysias convinces them the treaty is for the best before returning to Antioch.

The story of Menelaus's execution is possibly influenced by the Book of Esther, where Haman prepares a gallows 50 cubits high, the same height as the tower of ashes. Verse 4 calls God the "King of Kings", a term rare in Hellenistic Judaism, but common in Persian-era stories ("Shahanshah") such as Esther. Additionally, Esther describes three days of fasting, as does verse 12. The style of execution described is known to be used by Persian kings as well. Menelaus being killed without a burial place in the ground would have been considered a terrible fate to both Jewish and Hellenistic audiences of the era. It was a punishment inflicted on those who committed temple robbery and treason.

The introduction to the chapter suggests that Antiochus V Eupator would personally be leading the expedition and that "each" of Lysias and Eupator had a Greek force. As Eupator was only nine years old, it is generally considered that this passage was somehow garbled, whether via a scribal error, miswriting, or the epitomist exaggerating for impact. Later passages do not mention Eupator being personally present.

Lysias's expedition to Beth-Zur is once again mentioned, dated to 149 SE (Fall 164–Fall 163 BCE). The narrative does not make clear whether it is describing the same expedition as in Chapter 11 that also went to Beth-Zur, which is curious, as the book features good cross-referencing to earlier events in other places. Nevertheless, the epitomist does not write "again" or "despite his previous failure" or the like. This causes most scholars to believe that Chapter 11 and Chapter 13 are two separate accounts of what the epitomist considered the same campaign. The general assessment is to treat the account here as of events from the second expedition of Lysias described in 1 Maccabees Chapter 6. However, there are major differences between these accounts. No motive is given for the campaign here; according to 1 Maccabees, the Seleucids were trying to relieve a Maccabee siege of the Acra in Jerusalem. The Battle of Beth Zechariah, a Jewish defeat, is not mentioned by the epitomist; he does mention an incident involving killing a war elephant in a raid, possibly a distorted reference to Judas's brother Eleazar attacking an elephant at Beth Zechariah. Another disparity is that 1 Maccabees dates the second campaign to 150 SE, or 163/162 BCE. The epitomist describes the return of the Seleucid forces from Judea as due to political concerns with Philip rather than a military defeat, suggesting he knew about the Seleucid success but did not wish to bring it up; in 1 Maccabees, the Seleucids do retake Jerusalem and tear down the Temple wall, while this account implies the Seleucids never got that far. The mention of Modein is also considered unreliable; it is a famous location as where the Hasmoneans were living at the start of the revolt, but it is on the northwestern side of Jerusalem, while the rest of the account as well as 1 Maccabees suggests that the Seleucids approached from the southern route. One theory about the staccato nature of this chapter's version of the campaign is that if the epitomist or later editor acquired some separate source which became Chapter 10 and 11, he chopped out parts he considered duplicative from Jason of Cyrene's work, hence the story of the campaign in Chapter 13 seeming incomplete.

Just as in Chapter 11, an implausibly large Seleucid army is reported, with the 80,000 there growing to 110,000 infantry here (or even 220,000 if "each" is interpreted as there being two such armies!). Scholars of Hellenistic armies such as Israel Shatzman consider deploying, managing, and feeding such a vast army "impossible". The number of war elephants has shrunk to a more reasonable amount, with 22 compared to the 32 in 1 Maccabees 6 or the 80 mentioned in Chapter 11 and Josephus. Polybius reports that the Seleucids had 40 war elephants in a military parade at Daphne in 165 BCE. Bezalel Bar-Kochva speculates this was all they had, and that further around half were sent east to Babylonia and Persia, which would indeed leave around 20 war elephants for the Western half of the Empire. The mention of scythed chariots is also considered unreliable; if the Seleucids even still maintained any and had brought them, they would probably not have been taken into Judea's hilly interior, as they were a weapon that only functioned on flat lowlands such as the coast where they could get to a high enough speed.

The story of Rhodocus the traitor and the battles around Beth-Zur is extremely abbreviated and murky. Given its placement immediately after a statement that Judas sent "whatever was necessary" (supplies?) to Beth-Zur, perhaps Rhodocus was passing information on supply routes into Beth-Zur to the Seleucids. However, the narrative describes the Seleucids in short succession making a deal, attacking, being ultimately repulsed from Beth-Zur, then making a new deal with Judas, leaving unclear the impact of Rhodocus's treachery—allowing the Seleucids to cut supply lines, perhaps? 1 Maccabees seems to indicate that in the second campaign, the Seleucids did indeed successfully occupy Beth-Zur, rather than the account here. The series of battles around Beth-Zur, the attack on Judas's forces, and a new treaty between the king and the Jews are compressed into a mere 6 verses. Whether the epitomist was simply very uninterested in questions of provisions and cut the account down to a stub, or the epitomist was intentionally clouding what was an overall Jewish defeat by only including positive aspects, is disputed.

The story of Philip's rebellion is considered a useful secondary account, but has some issues and contradictions with other sources. Chapter 9 reported that he had already gone into exile in Egypt, but that is more likely to be a case of out-of-order sequencing. According to 1 Maccabees, Philip had claimed that Antiochus IV Epiphanes had appointed him regent and successor while on his campaign in the East. If the 1 Maccabees account is trusted, it is unlikely that Philip would have been actually appointed to a position by Lysias before his rebellion; rather, it is describing Philip returning to Syria and attempting to rally support for his claim over Lysias's.

The account of Hegemonides being appointed new governor of Coele-Syria has some backing archaeological evidence of such a person indeed being active at the time. An inscription found in Dyme in Greece records a Hegemonides, son of Zephyros making a dedication to Antiochus Epiphanes; an inscription in Laodicea in Syria honors a Hegemonides of Dyne. The city of Ptolemais, which apparently resisted the more Jewish-friendly policy of Hegemonides, is described in 1 Maccabees 5 as being known for their hostility to Jews.

== Chapter 14 ==
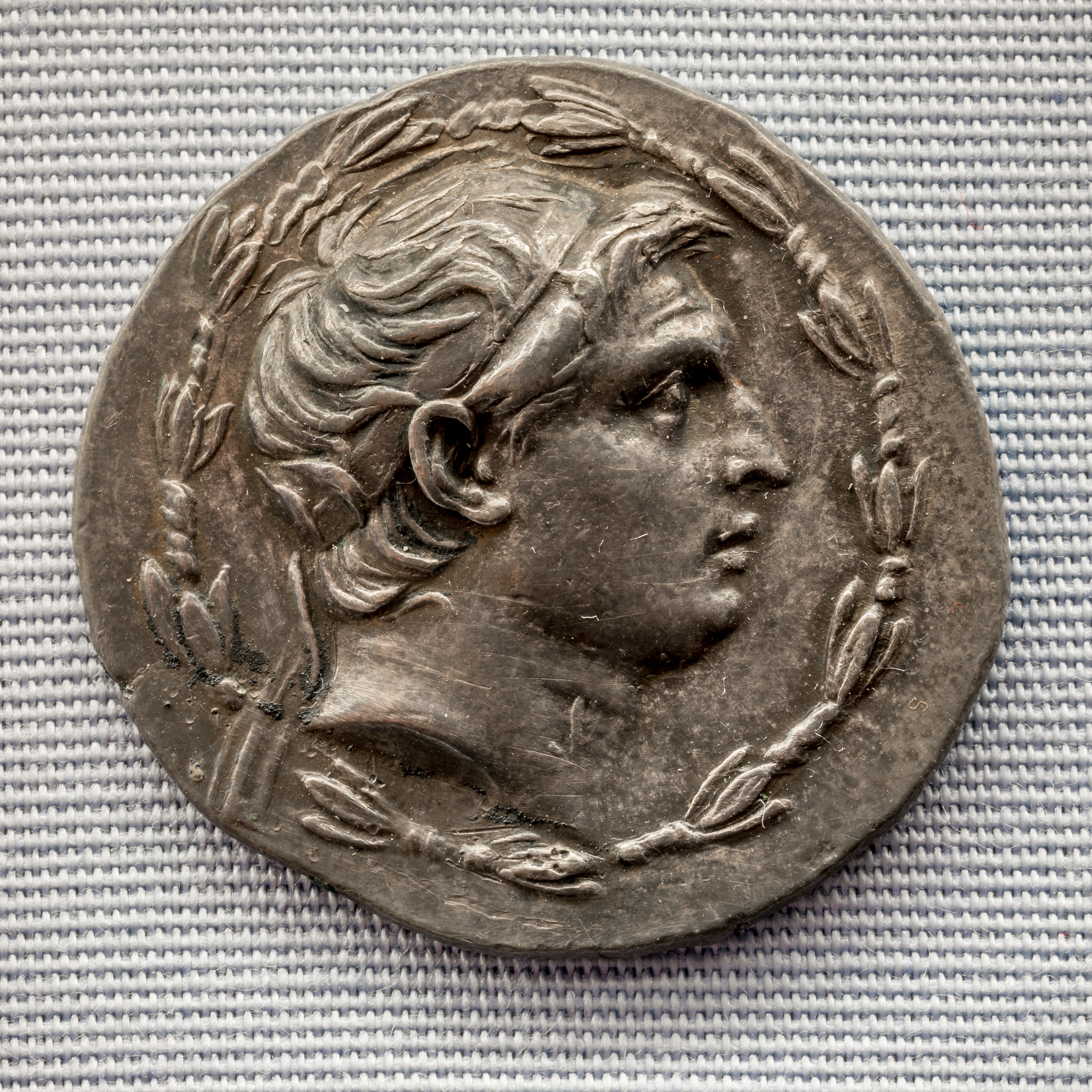
Face side of a coin of Demetrius I, the new king of the Seleucid Empire.

For as long as Judas lives, it is impossible for the government to find peace.

— Alcimus, in 2 Maccabees 14:10

Chapter 14 largely focuses on the rise of High Priest Alcimus, a new villain. In the capital of Antioch, Lysias and Antiochus V are overthrown by Demetrius I. In the year 151 SE (equivalent to Fall 162 – Fall 161 BCE), Alcimus arrives to criticize Judas Maccabeus and to petition to be installed as High Priest. Demetrius agrees. Alcimus is appointed High Priest, while Nicanor is given the governorship of Judea. While there is a brief clash at Dessau between Simon's forces and Nicanor's army where Nicanor wins, he is hesitant to immediately resort to renewed war. He sets out entreaties to Judas and the two meet. Surprisingly, the two become friends, and the situation calms in Jerusalem. Judas is appointed Nicanor's deputy as part of the peace deal, marries, and enjoys life. Alcimus is upset with this turn of events, and complains to King Demetrius. Demetrius sends Nicanor new orders to arrest Judas. Judas realizes something is wrong and begins avoiding Nicanor. Nicanor goes to the Temple and demands that the priests there arrange for Judas to be handed over, lest he level the Temple and replace it with one to Dionysus. The priests pray to God to protect the Temple in response. Nicanor orders the arrest of Razis, a respected elder of Jerusalem who has a good reputation. Razis attempts to commit suicide rather than be captured, but misaims his sword, and only wounds himself. He flings himself off the tower he is in, lands amidst the mob of soldiers, runs on top of a large rock while bleeding out, and takes his own innards out of his wound to throw at Nicanor's soldiers to ensure his death.

The opening of the chapter describes Demetrius arriving in Tripolis with a "strong force and fleet". Presumably the author wanted to build up Demetrius as a threat equivalent of Antiochus IV, but other sources including 1 Maccabees indicate he arrived with just a few close followers. Polybius, who personally knew Demetrius and was directly involved in the plot to smuggle him back to the Seleucid Empire, reports he chartered a normal, commercial ship to better lie low, hardly a fleet.

The chapter calls Alcimus a "former" high priest and writes he needed Demetrius's approval to establish his authority. This implies that Alcimus had been appointed high priest after Menelaus's execution, perhaps on some sort of temporary basis, by Lysias and Eupator. However, he apparently needed to get confirmation to stay in his role from the new king. The chapter is also vague on how exactly Alcimus "defiled himself" earlier. Various scholars, noting how Alcimus was apparently able to command the loyalty of many Jews and the lack of any apparent Hellenizing changes to Jewish worship during his tenure, doubt the veracity of this statement. While Alcimus clearly did become a Seleucid collaborator, it would make more sense for the government to have picked a Jew in good standing for the role; conversely, Maccabee-friendly sources would have wanted to discredit Alcimus to make his decision to serve the government as the choice of someone already untrustworthy and corrupt.

The installation of Alcimus and Nicanor's governorship are also covered in 1 Maccabees Chapter 7, although there are differences. 2 Maccabees is careful to spread the blame at the capital for the selection of Alcimus rather than accuse the king too directly, suggesting the king was misled by bad advice. The location of Dessau (or Caphar-Dessau) is unknown, nor is the battle there by Simon's forces described in 1 Maccabees. Judas is described here by Alcimus as the leader of the Asidaioi (or, if Hebraized, Hasideans), but the usage of the term seems to differ from how 1 Maccabees uses it. 1 Maccabees uses the term to describe a group of faithful Jews who did not follow Judas and were betrayed by Alcimus; 2 Maccabees seems to use the term to describe faithful or traditionalist Jews in general, from the root Hebrew/Aramic hysd, seen in hasidim (pious). Both this account and 1 Maccabees agree that Alcimus helped re-ignite hostilities after a truce. The versions of the story of Nicanor and Judas in 1 Maccabees and 2 Maccabees vary over the motives involved in a way that is consistent with the stance the authors respectively held. 1 Maccabees insists that the lull in relations was merely a ruse from the start, and that non-Jews cannot be trusted; 2 Maccabees, as a diaspora work, is willing to suggest peaceful coexistence and friendship with Gentiles was possible until a villain in Alcimus disrupted it. 2 Maccabees also depicts some of its villains as neutral at first who then choose to become evil before being punished by God; both Antiochus IV and Nicanor follow such a story arc. This account omits the expeditions of Bacchides, who served as Alcimus's escort in 1 Maccabees. Presumably this is because the epitomist found the overall success of Bacchides embarrassing and against the theme of the work; according to 1 Maccabees, Bacchides' first expedition was uncontested, and he later killed Judas at Elasa.

The threat of dedicating a new temple to Dionysus at the site of the Second Temple has the same issue as in Chapter 5; Dionysus was far more popular in Egypt than Syria, and was potentially a case of an Egyptian writer inventing dialogue that fit Egyptian culture closer than Seleucid culture.

The chapter sets up a contrast between Alcimus, who "defiled himself" during times of strife, and Razis, who remained "steadfast" during the earlier period and is now willing to gruesomely martyr himself rather than submit. Razis is described as an "elder"; this presumably means that he was a member of the gerusia or governing council, not that he was particularly old. The overall account is rather abrupt without much setup, possibly due to the epitomist omitting text as part of the abridgment; it does not explain if Nicanor had a more specific reason than distaste for the Jews to order the arrest Razis, if Razis knew of Judas's location, why 500 men were necessary, or how Razis ended up in a fortified tower. His extended death scene was possibly influenced by the death of Menoeceus, who is described as having a similar fate of a failed sword stroke followed by throwing himself into the enemy in Euripides' Phoenician Women. Theologically, the epitomist clearly approves of Razis's suicide. This stance was not uncommon in Judaism, which allowed suicide in certain dire situations, and certain branches of early Christianity; the 4th-5th century Donatists are reported as being famous for resorting to suicide rather than dishonor. However, the writer's endorsement of Razis's action was awkward in the Catholic Church, which both considered the book inspired but also sharply disapproved of direct suicide.

== Chapter 15 ==
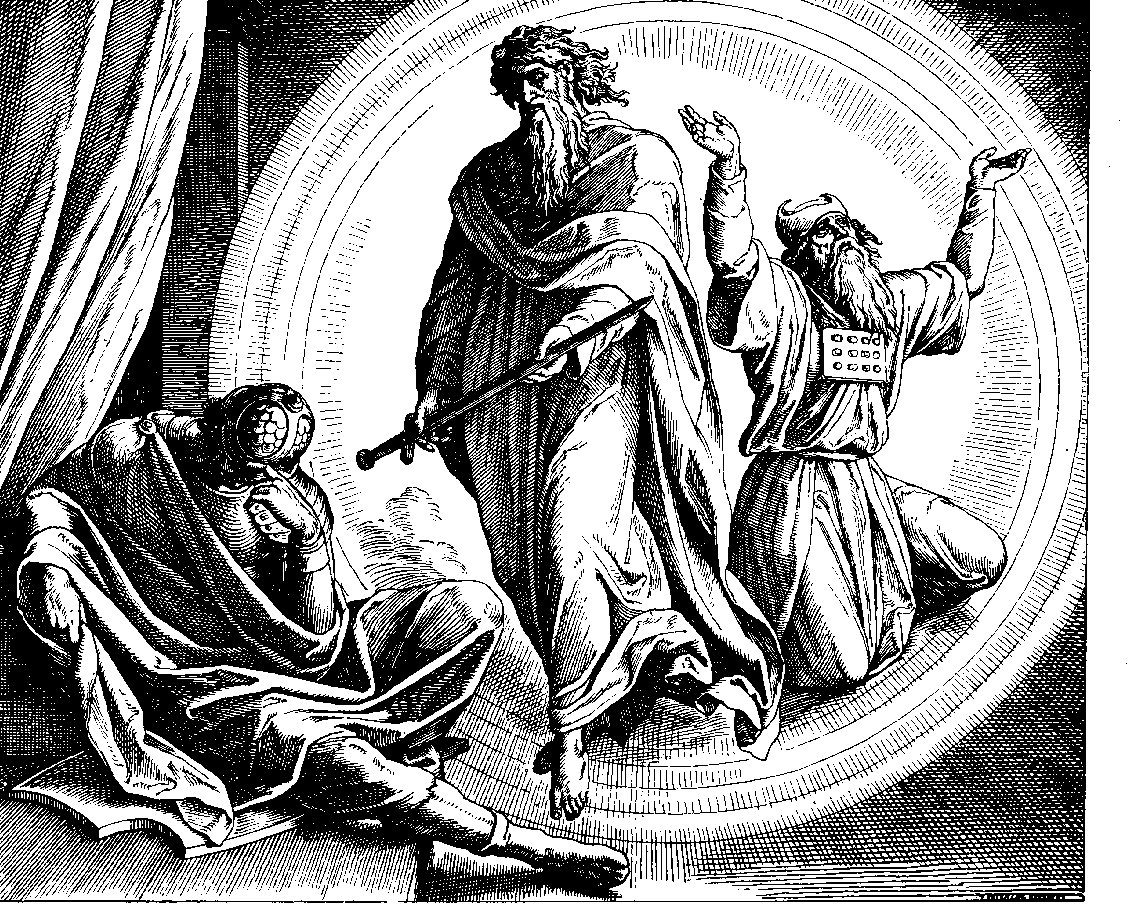
Judas is presented with a divine golden sword while asleep before the Battle of Adasa. Woodcut by Julius Schnorr von Carolsfeld from the 1860 Die Bibel in Bildern.

=== Nicanor's defeat ===
Nicanor and his troops advanced with trumpets and battle-songs, but Judas and his troops met the enemy in battle with invocations to God and prayers.

— 2 Maccabees 15:25–26

With the treaty in tatters, Nicanor moves out of Jerusalem toward Samaria to attack Judas's troops. He intends to attack on the Sabbath, knowing that the Jews will be unprepared to fight then. Conscripted Jews in his army complain about the plan. Preparing for battle, Judas relates to his troops a dream vision he says he had. While asleep, he saw the deceased High Priest Onias III and the prophet Jeremiah. Onias III says that Jeremiah is praying for all the people of Israel and Jeremiah gives Judas a golden sword. The Maccabee army resolves to attack first, seeing the enemy prepared with war elephants and cavalry on their flanks. Judas prays to God and invokes the dramatic past defeat of Sennacherib again. The Jews win the battle and slay 35,000 soldiers, including Nicanor himself. Nicanor's body is desecrated and his head is hung from the citadel in Jerusalem. The Jews resolve to celebrate 13 Adar as Nicanor's Day.

The chapter is something of an echo of Chapter 8, which too featured Judas fighting Nicanor immediately after an account of martyrdom; the lead-up to the battle and the battle itself are described similarly in both chapters, and Nicanor is once again called "thrice-accursed".

It is not entirely clear whether Nicanor is successfully able to time the encounter to the Sabbath; it is immediately followed by a statement that "he did not succeed in carrying out his abominable design," but it is unclear whether this statement foretells the coming ultimate defeat of Nicanor or merely means that he failed to time the attack on Judas's forces to the Sabbath day. Some interpreters of 2 Maccabees believe that the author holds that even defensive warfare on the Sabbath is forbidden; others believe that the references to enemies attempting to attack on the Sabbath (including Nicanor here and Apollonius in 5:25-27) were merely showing how villainous they were in violating a holy day in an attempt to gain an advantage. The later Hasmoneans certainly considered defensive warfare on the Sabbath permissible, as seen in 1 Maccabees.

In Judas's dream he relates to his troops, Jeremiah is said to pray for all the people. This may simply be a reference to Jeremiah's popularity in the era, but also is a literary echo to the Book of Jeremiah. In that work, Jeremiah is specifically urged by God not to pray for the people in the first half so that the prophesied destruction can take place. It is only much later in Jeremiah 42 that he is allowed to pray for the people; a reference to Jeremiah himself praying for Judea suggests a powerful support and a turning point for those familiar with the work. These verses were also used later in Catholic theology to support the doctrine of the intercession of saints who pray for the welfare of Christians on Earth.

The author is not particularly interested in the details of battle strategy and tactics, and instead emphasizes that it is a battle between the pious who trust in God and the impious. As with similar figures in the book, the recorded casualty count of 35,000 is greatly inflated and considered entirely implausible. Demetrius would presumably have concentrated most of his forces to oppose Timarchus during this time period, and the narrative itself already recounts that Nicanor was reduced to conscripting local Jews, suggesting that there were not even close to 35,000 Seleucid soldiers at the battle, let alone casualties. The mention of war elephants is also considered unlikely to be accurate, as Polybius records that the Romans hamstrung all of the Seleucid's remaining elephants in 162 BCE. While it is possible the Romans might have missed a few elephants, 1 Maccabees makes no reference to elephants appearing at this battle.

The new holiday of Nicanor's Day on 13 Adar is described as being "the day before Mordecai's day". 14 Adar is Purim; this account is one of the oldest pieces of surviving literature to refer to its commemoration. It is unique in suggesting the holiday may have been called Mordecai's Day in the Hasmonean period; this appellation is not found in other surviving literature. The writer is also aware that "Adar" is not a term originally from Hebrew, referring to it as a loanword.

=== Epilogue ===
This, then, is how matters turned out with Nicanor, and from that time the city [Jerusalem] has been in the possession of the Hebrews.

— 2 Maccabees 15:37

Verses 37-39 are a brief epilogue from the epitomist concluding the history, expressing his hope that the reader enjoyed the work, and apologizing if the reader did not.

Verse 37's confident declaration on the safety of Jerusalem suggests that the author apparently did not consider whatever happened in Jerusalem after Judas's defeat at Elasa as sufficiently bad to contradict this statement, was referring only to the Temple Sanctuary rather than the city as a whole, or else did not intend to extend the claim beyond Nicanor's defeat. It could also be taken as a tacit admission that High Priest Alcimus, whose term would last until May 159 BCE, still qualified as a "Hebrew". Verse 37 has also been used to argue for a later bound on the date of authorship. It suggests that 2 Maccabees was unlikely to have been written after 63 BCE, when the Hasmonean kingdom was reduced to client state status to the Roman Republic. That said, there are different ways to interpret the tense of the statement in Greek, leaving some ambiguity.

One of the unknowns of the study of 2 Maccabees is if Jason of Cyrene's history also ended with Nicanor's defeat, or if it continued further and the later parts were omitted in the abridgment. Jonathan A. Goldstein makes an argument that the epilogue suggests that Jason's history indeed went further, as the epitomist declines to say that Jason's history stopped hence his abridgment stopping as well. To the extent that 2 Maccabees was intended as a "festal book" to be used as reading material during Nicanor's Day or Hanukkah, the establishment of the festival itself may have been a logical stopping point.

Jean Calvin was unimpressed with the epilogue's casual tone in apologizing if the reader disliked the work, and used it to argue in favor of the de-canonicalization of the book during the Protestant Reformation. Calvin wrote "He who confesses that his writings stand in need of pardon, certainly proclaims that they are not oracles of the Holy Spirit."

The epilogue makes an analogy to how water alone and wine alone are worse than drinking water mixed with wine, the common practice in the era when wine was stored in a very potent form for more efficient transit. There was a Greek cultural belief that only Dionysus himself could drink unmixed wine without going crazy. What exactly the water and wine correspond to is less clear; the original history of Jason of Cyrene being the wine and the epitomist's editing being the water to make it more palatable, perhaps?

One passage's phrasing can also be surprising to modern readers: the hope that the "story delights the ears of those who read the work". In antiquity, "silent reading" was not common, and readers spoke aloud as they read, even if reading alone.

== Bibliography ==
- Bar-Kochva, Bezalel (1989). Judas Maccabaeus: The Jewish Struggle Against the Seleucids. Cambridge University Press. ISBN 0521323525.
- Doran, Robert (2012). Attridge, Harold W. (ed.). 2 Maccabees: A Critical Commentary. Hermeneia. Minneapolis: Augsburg Fortress Press. ISBN 9780800660505.
- Harrington, Daniel J. (2012). First and Second Maccabees. Collegeville, Minnesota: Liturgical Press. ISBN 978-0-8146-2846-1.
- Harrington, Daniel J. (2009) [1988]. The Maccabean Revolt: Anatomy of a Biblical Revolution. Eugene, Oregon: Wipf and Stock. ISBN 978-1-60899-113-6.
- Goldstein, Jonathan A. (1983). II Maccabees: A New Translation with Introduction and Commentary. The Anchor Bible Series. Vol. 41A. Garden City, NY: Doubleday. ISBN 0-385-04864-5.
- Schwartz, Daniel R. (2008). 2 Maccabees. Commentaries on Early Jewish Literature. Berlin: Walter De Gruyter. ISBN 978-3-11-019118-9.
- van Henten, Jan Willem (1997). The Maccabean Martyrs as Saviours of the Jewish People. Leiden: Brill. ISBN 90-04-10976-5.
