= Jason of Cyrene =

Hellenistic Jewish historian (fl. 2nd century BCE)

Jason of Cyrene (Greek: Ἰάσων ὁ Κυρηναῖος) was a Hellenistic Jew who lived around the middle of the second century BCE (fl. ~160–110 BCE?). He is the author of a five-volume history of the Maccabean Revolt and its preceding events (~178–160 BCE), which subsequently became a lost work. His history was preserved indirectly in an abridgment by an unknown Egyptian Jew, the book of 2 Maccabees, which was eventually included in the Septuagint, the Greek version of the Jewish scriptures. 2 Maccabees was eventually recognized as a deuterocanonical book included in the Catholic and Orthodox Christian biblical canon.

== Life ==
Jason of Cyrene is an unknown Hellenistic Jew. While Greek-speaking, he still favored the rebel Maccabees in their revolt against the Seleucid Empire; the rebels included both traditionalist Aramaic-speaking Jews as well as Greek-speaking Jews who opposed the anti-Jewish decrees of King Antiochus IV Epiphanes. Cyrene, Libya in the Hellenistic era was a province at the western edge of the Ptolemaic Kingdom, which also included Egypt and Cyprus. Diaspora Jews had spread through Ptolemaic lands in this era, so him being from Cyrene is plausible, and the long-standing Ptolemaic rivalry with the Seleucids that had resulted in the Syrian Wars would have meant that supporting the Maccabees and opposing the Seleucids would have aligned with the politics of the government, so there would be little fear of censorship.

Some scholars suggest that Jason might have been an eyewitness to the events of the Maccabean Revolt and lived in Judea at some point. This is dismissed by other scholars as unlikely, as parts of the book 2 Maccabees that seem likely to stem from Jason's history make strange geographical statements concerning the region, such as a claim in 2 Maccabees 12:9 that a fire in distant Jamnia was visible from Jerusalem.

== Lost history and 2 Maccabees ==
Jason's work is said to have been in five books, originally written in Koine Greek. The original work is lost and known only in the epitome made by the author of 2 Maccabees. According to the introductory chapters of 2 Maccabees, also written in Greek:

The story of Judas Maccabeus and his brothers, and the purification of the great temple, and the dedication of the altar, and further the wars against Antiochus Epiphanes and his son Eupator, and the appearances that came from heaven to those who fought bravely for Judaism, so that though few in number they seized the whole land and pursued the barbarian hordes, and regained possession of the temple famous throughout the world, and liberated the city, and re-established the laws that were about to be abolished, while the Lord with great kindness became gracious to them— all this, which has been set forth by Jason of Cyrene in five volumes, we shall attempt to condense into a single book.

— 2 Maccabees 2:19–23 (NRSV)

The epitomist goes on to imply that Jason's original work "discuss matters from every side, and to take trouble with details, but the one who recasts the narrative should be allowed to strive for brevity of expression and to forego exhaustive treatment." It is also unknown just how much freedom the epitomist allowed himself with Jason's narrative; in addition to rearranging it, he likely added his own details and altered others. Some readers of 2 Maccabees suggest that they can determine the "original" five parts that correspond to Jason's five volumes; the 1913 Catholic Encyclopedia proposed the parts may be divided by verses 3:40, 7:42, 10:9, 13:26, and 15:37.

As the date of authorship of 2 Maccabees is unknown, so too is the date of Jason's work, other than that it must be prior to the abridgment. Most believe 2 Maccabees to have been written around 100 BCE, with some such as Daniel Schwartz suggesting even earlier dates as around 150 BCE. Many scholars believe that Jason was likely a contemporary of Judas and the Maccabean Revolt, citing occasional highly accurate passages in 2 Maccabees. If this is true, then Jason's volume was likely written at some point in the middle of the second century BCE, from ~160–130 BCE. One interesting possibility is that the book of 1 Maccabees mentions an emissary sent by Judas Maccabeus to the Roman Republic named Jason; most believe that this Jason being the same person is doubtful, however.

2 Maccabees ends with the victory of Judas over Nicanor in 161 BCE at the Battle of Adasa. It is not known whether Jason's work stopped there as well, or if the epitomist of 2 Maccabees cut the story there, perhaps for literary reasons. If the motive of the author of 2 Maccabees was telling an uplifting account praising Judas Maccabeus, then stopping there would avoid Judas's upcoming death; if the motive of the author was to show that the Temple of Jerusalem had been protected, Nicanor's threats against it thwarted, and the Jewish religion restored, then this too would indicate that Adasa was an acceptable stopping point.

Historian Jonathan A. Goldstein argues that Jason was familiar with the apocalyptic prophecy of the second half of the Book of Daniel, and took pains to sculpt his history to validate and endorse Daniel's version of events where he could. While he did not concoct events from thin air, he did adjust them and their chronology such that they more closely aligned with Daniel.
