= Robert Doran (born 1940) =

Australian-American scholar

Robert Doran (born 1940) is a scholar of religion, particularly early Christianity and Hellenistic Judaism. He held a position of professor of Religion and European Studies at Amherst College in Massachusetts and took emeritus status in 2020. At Amherst, he had the named chair of Samuel Williston Professor of Greek and Hebrew.

His areas of research include the book 2 Maccabees, which he has published several works and commentaries on, as well as Syrian Christianity including the saint Simeon Stylites and the Edessan community. He has also published on the lost works of Hellenistic era Jewish writers and historians such as Aristeas the Exegete, Pseudo-Eupolemus, Cleodemus Malchus, and Pseudo-Hecataeus. He has also served as an editor at Catholic Biblical Quarterly.

== Personal life ==
Doran earned his Doctorate of Theology from Harvard Divinity School where he studied under John Strugnell among others. Doran's wife, Susan Niditch, is also a professor of religion at Amherst College and also attended Harvard; they were both appointed to tenure-track positions at Amherst in 1978.

== Works ==
Books

- Doran, Robert (1981). Temple Propaganda: The Purpose and Character of 2 Maccabees. Catholic Biblical Quarterly Monograph Series 12. Washington, DC: Catholic Biblical Association.
- Doran, Robert (1992). The Lives of Simeon Stylites. Cistercian Press.
- Doran, Robert (1995). Birth of a Worldview: Early Christianity in Its Jewish and Pagan Context. Routledge.
- Doran, Robert (2006). Stewards of the Poor: The Man of God, Rabbula and Hiba in Fifth-Century Edessa. Cistercian Publications.
- Doran, Robert (2012). Attridge, Harold W. (ed.). 2 Maccabees: A Critical Commentary. Hermeneia. Minneapolis: Augsburg Fortress Press. ISBN 9780800660505.

Selected sections in larger works

- "1 Maccabees and 2 Maccabees". The New Interpreter's Bible. Vol. 4. Nashville: Abingdon Press. 1994.
- Barton, John; Muddiman, John, eds. (2001). "2 Maccabees". The Oxford Bible Commentary (Online ed.). Oxford University Press. ISBN 9780191979897.
- "1 – 2 Maccabees". The Jerome Biblical Commentary for the Twenty-First Century (3rd ed.). T&T Clark. 2022.
