= Timnath =

Timna, Timnah or Timnath may refer to:

== People ==
- Timna Nelson-Levy (born 1994), Israeli Olympic judoka

== Places ==
Places in Israel and Palestine
Place in Yemen
- Timna Valley (Hebrew: תִּמְנָע, Hebrew pronunciation: [timˈna(ʕ)]) in southern Israel
- Timna, a place in Yemen
- Timnah (Hebrew: תִּמְנָה or תִּמְנָתָה), Philistine city mentioned in the Bible in the Book of Judges
- Timnath-heres (Hebrew: תמנת חרס), also called Thamna, a historical place in Samaria
- Timnath, Colorado, a town in the United States

== Sites associated or identified with ancient places called Timna, Timnah, or Timnath ==
- Khirbet Tibnah on SWP map 14, misidentified with biblical Timnah
- Khirbet et-Tibbaneh, on SWP map 17; different from Timnah from SWP map 16

== Other uses ==
- Intel Timna, a CPU planned, but not manufactured by Intel
