= Khirbet 'Adasa =

Archaeological site in Jerusalem, Israel

Khirbet 'Adash
- Location within Jerusalem
- 31.846591°N 35.214434°E
- Type: ruin
- Location: Jerusalem
- PAL: 172/137

Site notes
- Condition: In ruins

Khirbet 'Adash is an archaeological site located in northern Jerusalem.

== Geography ==
The site is located 5 kilometers north of Jerusalem's city center, near Pisgat Ze'ev. It is situated one kilometer north of Tell el-Ful, an archaeological site commonly identified with the biblical Gibeah, or Giv'at Sha'ul.

== Settlement history ==
=== Antiquity ===
The site was inhabited in the Hellenistic and Roman periods.

Several scholars have attempted to link Khirbat 'Adasa with the biblical site of Hadashah, described in Book of Joshua (15:37) as being near Jerusalem.

Some scholars suggest that Khirbat 'Adasa might also be identical with Adasa, the site of the battle of Adasa (c. 160 BCE) during the Maccabean Revolt, where Judas Maccabeus led the Jewish forces against the Seleucid general Nicanor.

=== Medieval period ===
A preliminary survey initially suggested the site was abandoned after the Byzantine period. However, excavations show it was resettled at the end of the Byzantine era, and expanded in the 8th and 9th centuries during Early Islamic times.

Several structures, including a residential unit and likely a stable, were built in the village's eastern part in the late seventh or early eighth century and remained in use until the 10th century.

The village was abandoned in the 11th century but was resettled during the Mamluk period.

=== Ottoman period ===
In 1596, the early Ottoman era, the place appeared in the tax-records as Hirbat Bani Adas in the Nahiya of Quds of the Liwa of Quds, with an all Muslim population of 4 households. The villagers paid a fixed tax rate of 25 % on various agricultural products; such as wheat (1000 akçe), barley (560 a.) olive trees (120 a.), goats and beehives (120 a.), in addition to "occasional revenues" (100 a); a total of 2000 akçe.

In 1883, the Palestine Exploration Fund's Survey of Western Palestine found at Khurbet Adaseh (southern): "Ruined walls, a small birkeh about 24 feet by 14, and numerous rock-cut cisterns".

== Bibliography ==
- Conder, C.R.; Kitchener, H.H. (1883). The Survey of Western Palestine: Memoirs of the Topography, Orography, Hydrography, and Archaeology. Vol. 3. London: Committee of the Palestine Exploration Fund.
- Féderlin, L. "Gab'aat Saül. Bat-Gallim. La'isa. Anathot. Medmena. Gabim". Revue biblique. new series, 3: 270-273.
- Hütteroth, W.-D.; Abdulfattah, K. (1977). Historical Geography of Palestine, Transjordan and Southern Syria in the Late 16th Century. Erlanger Geographische Arbeiten, Sonderband 5. Erlangen, Germany: Vorstand der Fränkischen Geographischen Gesellschaft. ISBN 3-920405-41-2.
- Palmer, E.H. (1881). The Survey of Western Palestine: Arabic and English Name Lists Collected During the Survey by Lieutenants Conder and Kitchener, R. E. Transliterated and Explained by E.H. Palmer. Committee of the Palestine Exploration Fund.
- Pringle, D. (2009). The Cities of Acre and Tyre with Addenda and Corrigenda to Volumes 1-3. Vol. IV. Cambridge University Press. ISBN 9780521851480. (pp. 233- 234)
