= Khirbet et-Tibbaneh =

Ancient ruin in the Judean mountains

- خربة التبانة (Arabic) תמנה אשר ביהודה (Hebrew)
- Tibna / Timnah
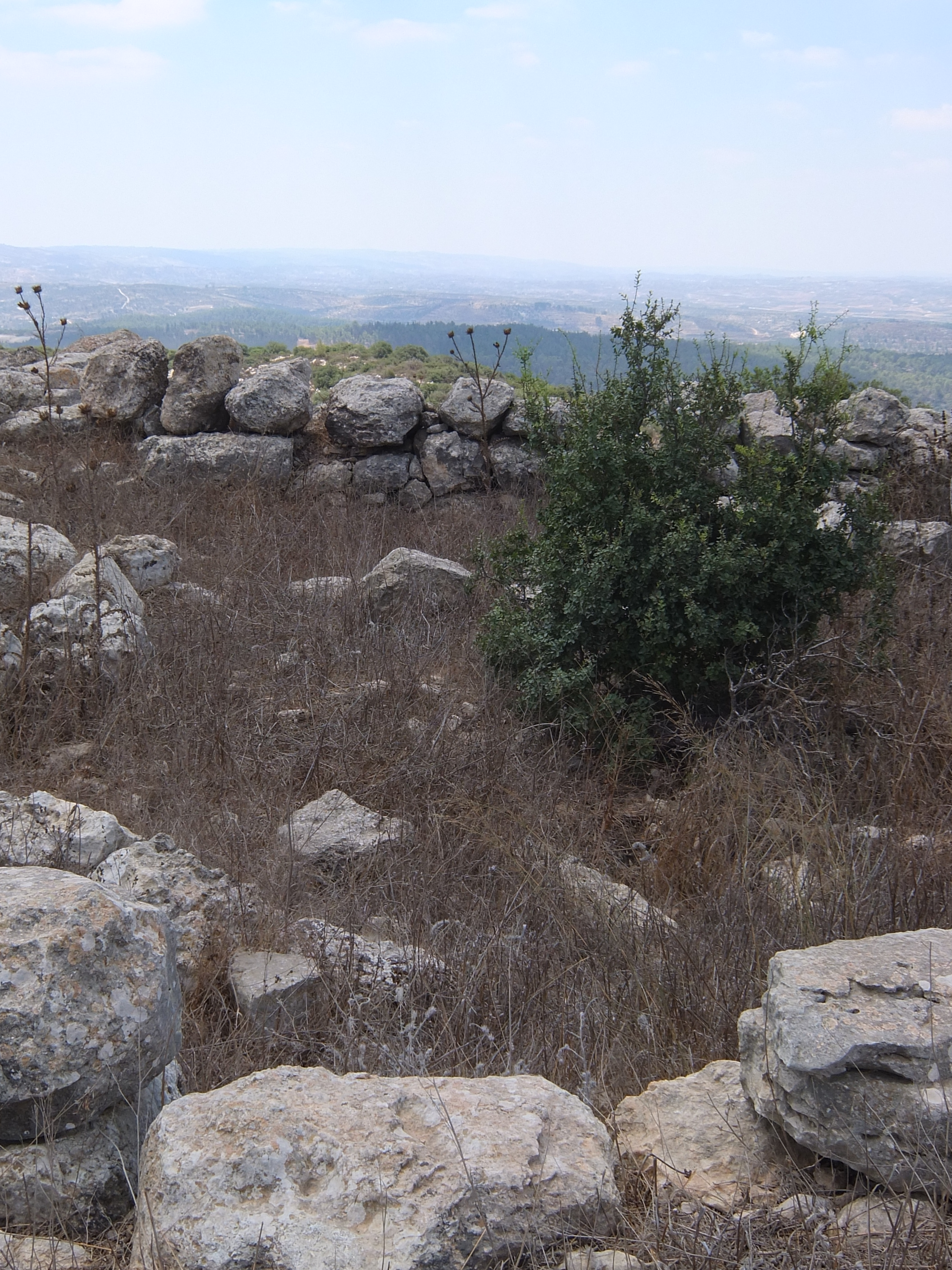
- View of stone structures in situ

- Location within Israel
- 31°41′36″N 35°02′44″E
- Periods: Late Iron II, Hellenistic, Roman
- Cultures: Canaanite, Jewish, Greco-Roman
- Location: Israel
- Region: Judaean Mountains

History
- Built: Canaanite period
- Abandoned: unknown

Site notes
- Excavation dates: none
- Condition: Ruin

Khirbet et-Tibbâneh (Hurvat Tibneh / Kh. Tibna)(Arabic: خربة التبانة), sometimes referred to by historical geographers as the Timnah of Judah (Hebrew: תמנה), is a small ruin situated on a high ridge in the Judaean mountains, in the Sansan Nature Reserve, 622 metres (2,041 ft) above sea level, about 3 kilometers east of Aviezer and ca. 7 kilometers southeast of Bayt Nattif.

The site is thought to have formerly borne the name Timnath (distinct from the Tel Batash-Timnah site associated with the biblical story of Samson in the lower foothills of Judea along the Sorek valley). Khirbet et-Tibbaneh or Timnah is perched upon a high mountain ridge rising up from the Elah valley and is where the episode of Judah and Tamar is thought to have taken place.

== Etymology ==
Orientalists, Clermont-Ganneau and Edward Robinson, have made a point in showing the etymological Hebrew origins of certain Arabic place-names, saying that the Hebrew place-name Timnah was to be recognised in the Arabic corruption, Tibneh or Tibna. John William McGarvey (1829–1911) who quotes Conder on the linguistic evidence of the name says that, in Arabic, "the substitution of B for M is so common (as in Tibneh for Timnah)..." Both names have been preserved in the respective sites.

== Site and identification ==
In ancient Jewish classical literature, two distinct sites in the land of Judah bore the name Timnath (Timnah). The Book of Joshua records the names of two towns, both in the tribal inheritance of Judah and having the identical name of Timnath; the one Timnath (Josh. 15:10) being transcribed alongside the name of Beit Shemesh, while the other Timnath (Josh. 15:57) being transcribed alongside the name of Gibeah (of Judah), a town said to be Jab'a. The Jerusalem Talmud (Sotah 1:8) relates the following tradition: "Rav has said: There were two Timnaths; one mentioned in connection with Judah, and the other mentioned in connection with Samson." The Talmudic exegetes have explained that Samson, who lived in the hilltop town of Zorah near Beit Shemesh, is said to have 'gone down' to Timnath, but Judah is said to have 'gone up' to Timnath. Kh. et-Tibbâneh is thought to be the Timnath (Timnah) mentioned in connection with Judah and Tamar (Genesis 38: 13, 14), although this view remains inconclusive.

Khirbet et Tibbaneh (Tibna) was visited by Palestine Exploration Fund explorers, Conder and Kitchener, in the late 19th-century, where they described the ruin as follows: "Timnah - A town of Judah (Josh. XV. 57), mentioned with Gibeah. There is a ruin called Tibna near Jeb'a, in the higher hills of ʾArkûb, distinct from Tibneh (Sheet XVI), which represents the Timnah of Joshua XV.10."

Others are unsure of its identification, since the site has yet to be fully excavated.

=== Site's description ===
The ancient ruin sits on a high mountain ridge about 2 kilometers west of Khirbet Sanasin. The site lies 7 kilometres (4.3 mi) northeast of Adullam. On its site is found the remnant of a square Iron Age fortress which apparently offered security along the route from the valley of Elah to Betar and to Jerusalem. The area of the fortress is 30 by 30 meters (98 ft × 98 ft), where two walls made of fieldstones and ashlar masonry still remain, whose hollowed spaces were filled-in with smaller stones. Amihai Mazar suggests that the structure served as either a fortress or an administrative center, and most likely manned by a garrison to secure the roads between the major towns of the Shephelah and the string of settlements along the edge of the hill region.

The mound is almost entirely strewn with razed boulders, and ancillary walls, partially standing, are to be seen on the ruin. On its eastern side is a steep declivity, descending down into the valley below, Wadi Tibbaneh (Wadi Tibna), where it joins Etzion Valley (Wady el Jindy) to its south at a drop of about 200 metres (660 ft). The valley seemed to have been used for horticulture in ages past. Sherds dot the landscape, with occasional carob trees, oaks and buckthorns. Near the site is a modern-day quarry and two ancient cisterns. In close proximity to Khirbet et-Tibbaneh is the old military patrol road, leading from Tzur Hadassah to Aviezer.

== History ==
Khirbet et-Tibbaneh (Tibna) is thought to be the "Tapuna" mentioned in the list of Thutmose III.

Israeli archaeologist Michael Avi-Yonah also thinks the site to have been the Timnah (Thamnatha) mentioned in 1 Maccabees (9:50–52) and later mentioned by Josephus in Antiquities of the Jews 13.1.3, one of several places fortified by Bacchides in ca. 160 BCE after the death of Judas Maccabeus. Others suggest that the account in Maccabees may refer to another Timna (Thamnatha), that called Khirbet Tibnah in southwestern Samaria at Mount Ephraim, about 14 kilometers (8.7 miles) northwest of Bethel.

It is generally accepted that the Mishnaic scholar Simeon the Yemenite was born and raised in one of the two Timnahs during the waning years of the Second Temple period based on the vowels assigned to his name (Hebrew: שמעון התִּימְנִי, romanized: Šimʿon hat-Tîmnî). He is noted for saying: "A mamzer is anyone who is born from an [illegal] union for which his parents are liable to kareth." (Mishnah, Yebamot 4:13; Babylonian Talmud, Yebamot 49a), and which teaching comes to exclude a single parent who gave birth to a child outside of wedlock, and whose child is often wrongly called "bastard" under common law.

== Archaeological finds ==
As of 2018, the site at Khirbet Tibbaneh has yet to be excavated. The site was surveyed by Dani Weiss, Boaz Zissu and Gideon Solimany of the Israel Antiquities Authority, who discovered a segment of an ancient road that was 200 m. long, 2.5 m. wide. A cursory review of the site has revealed late Iron II sherds.

== Gallery ==
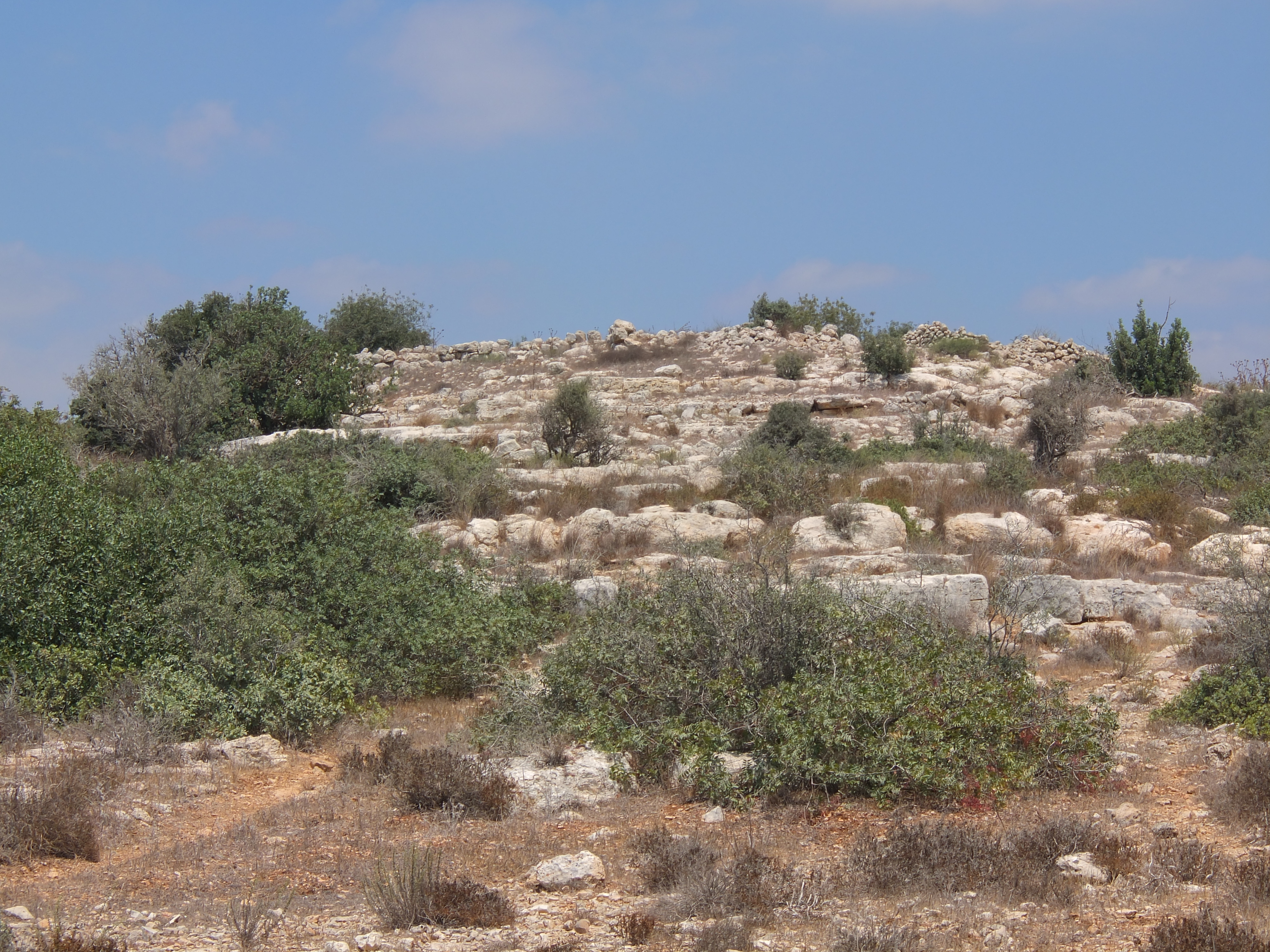
Khirbet et-Tibbâneh

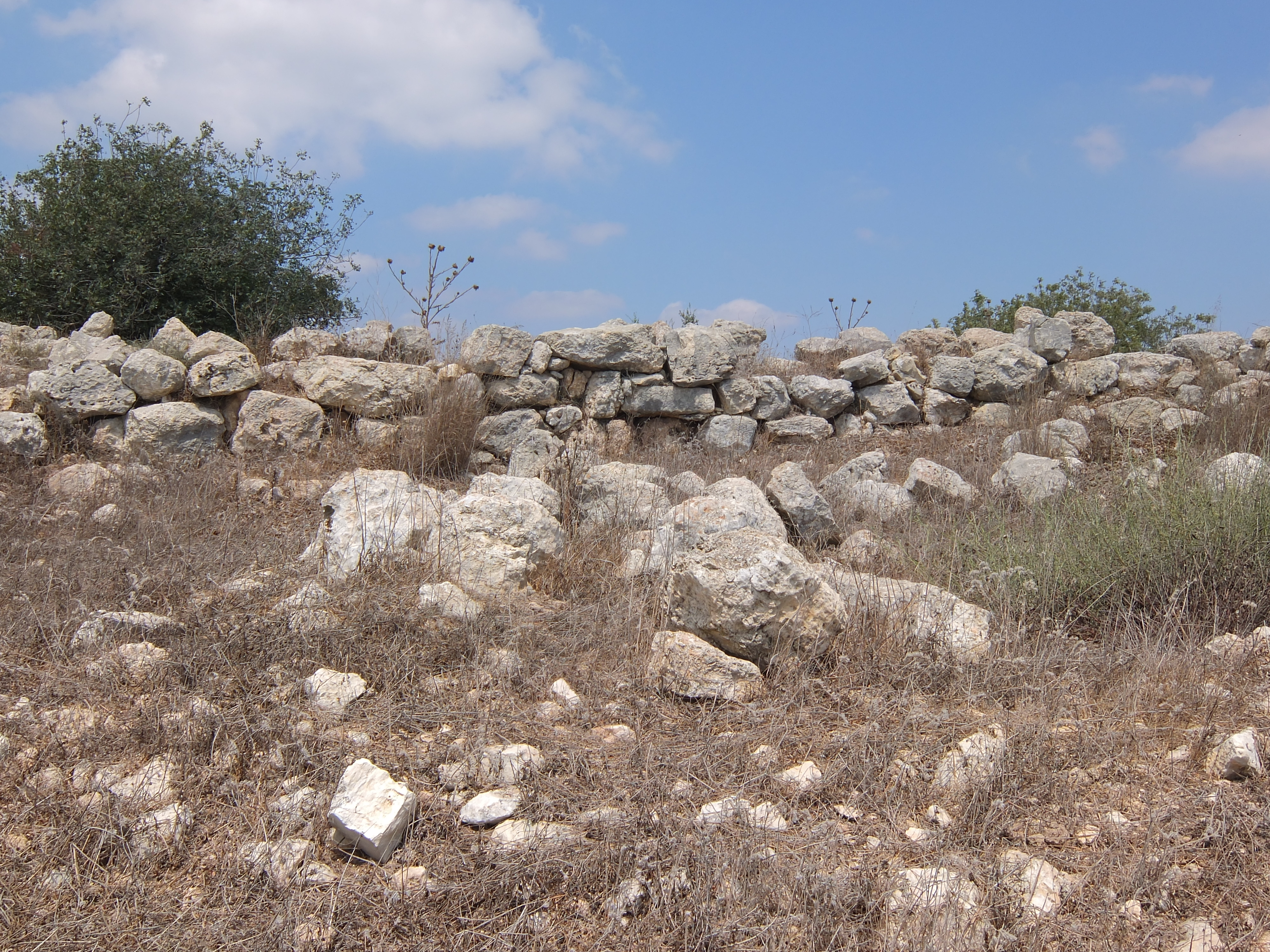
Walls of Timnah

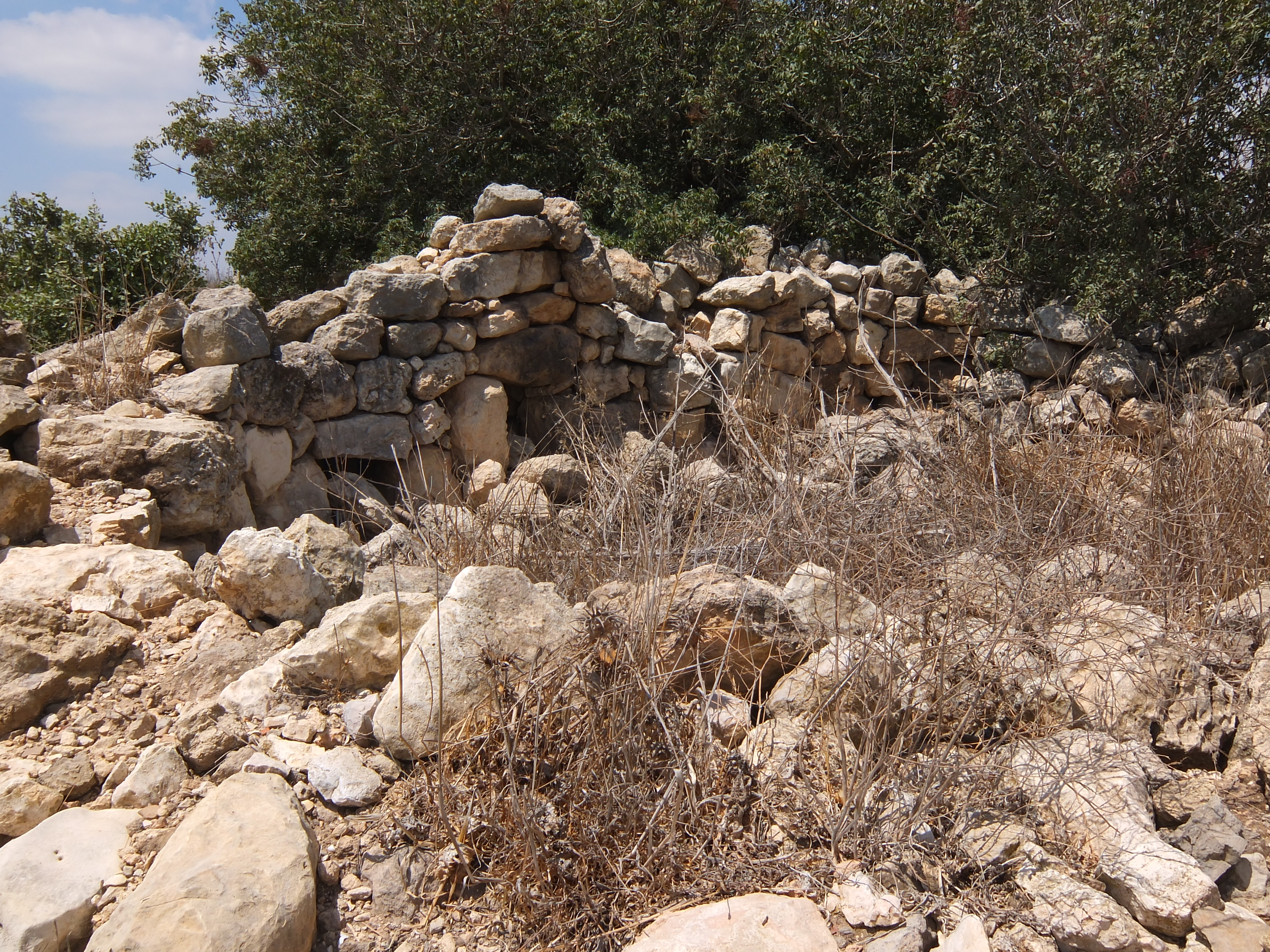
General ruins

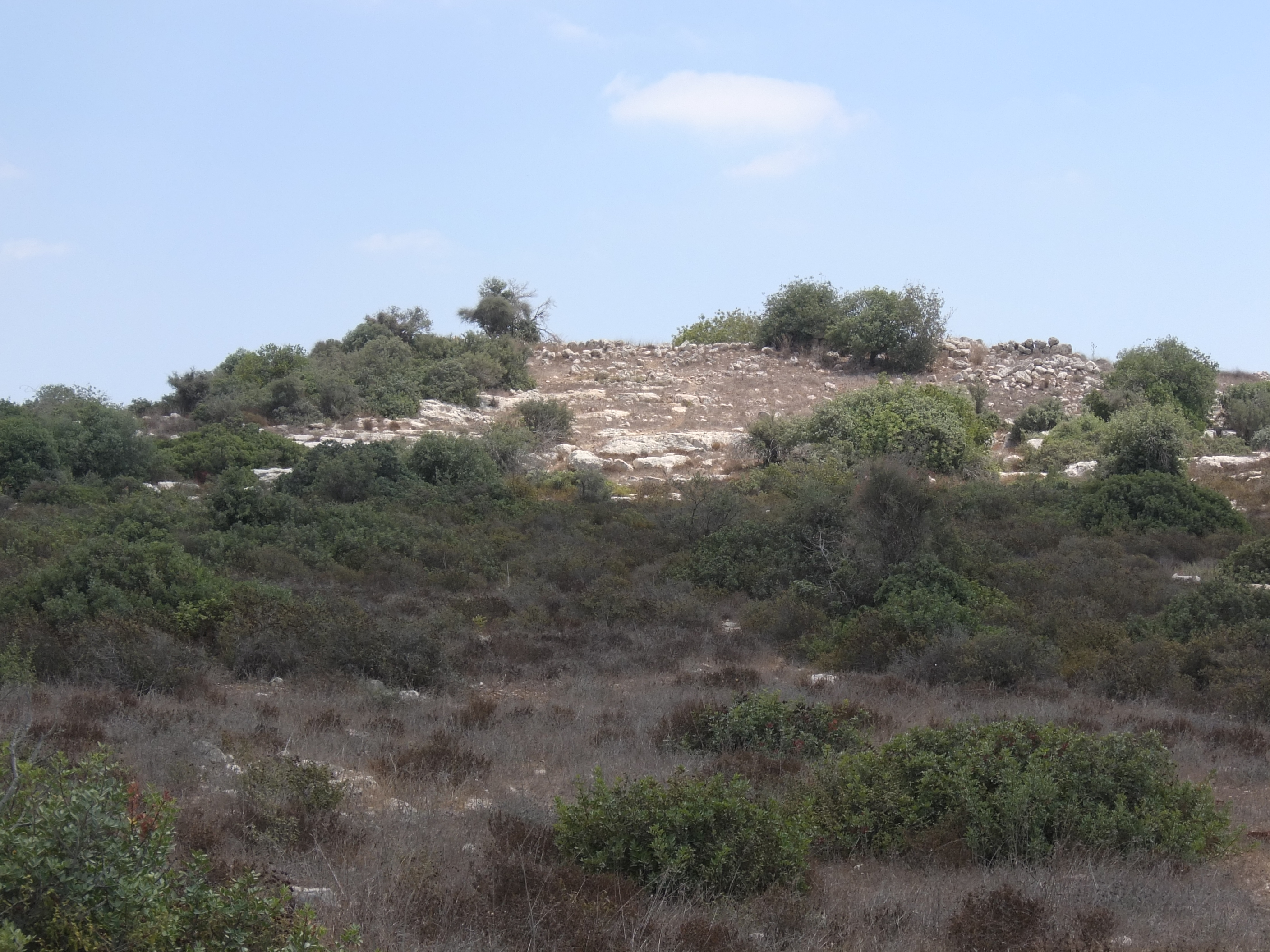
Timnath of Judah

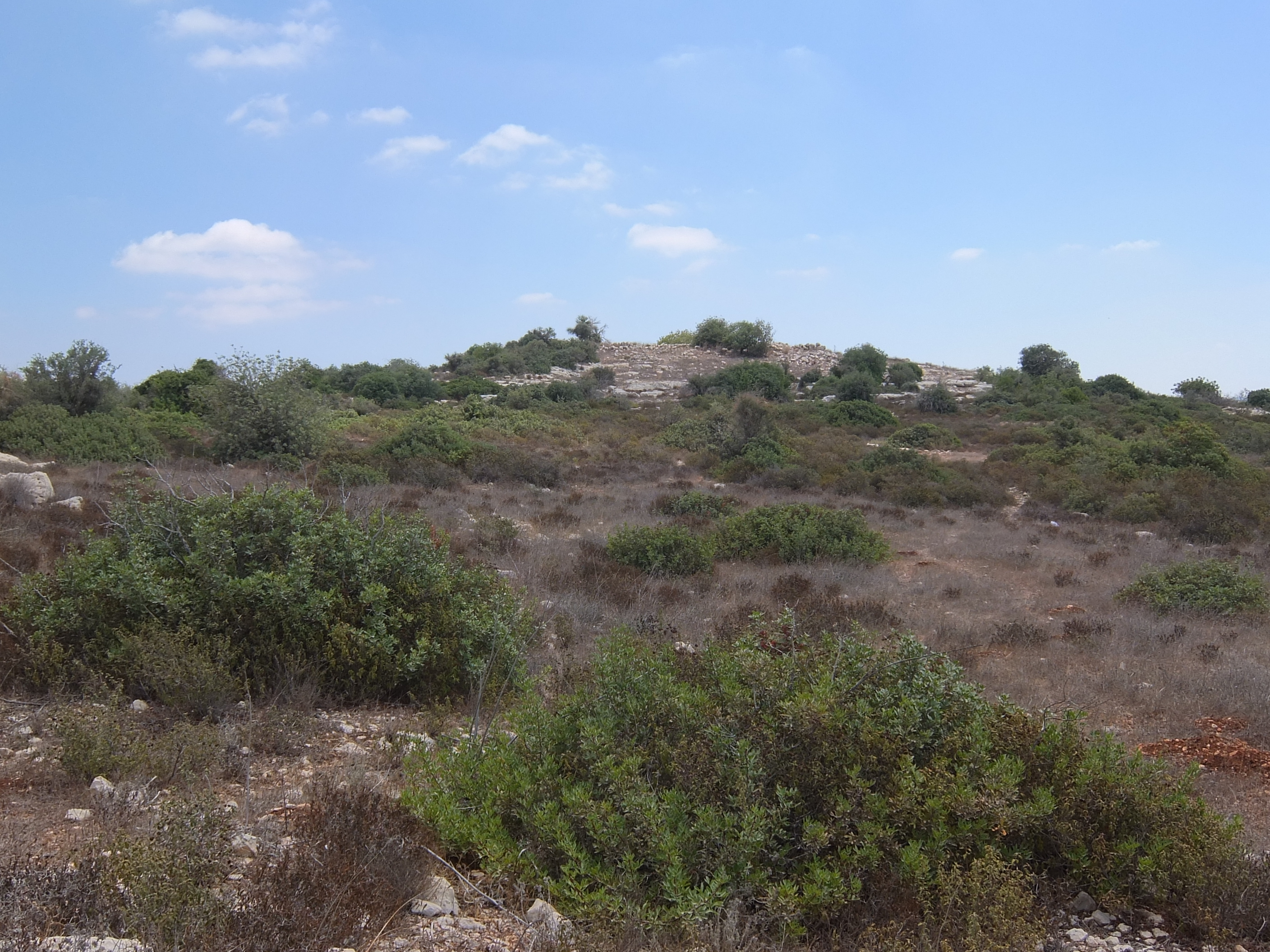
Khirbet et-Tibbâneh

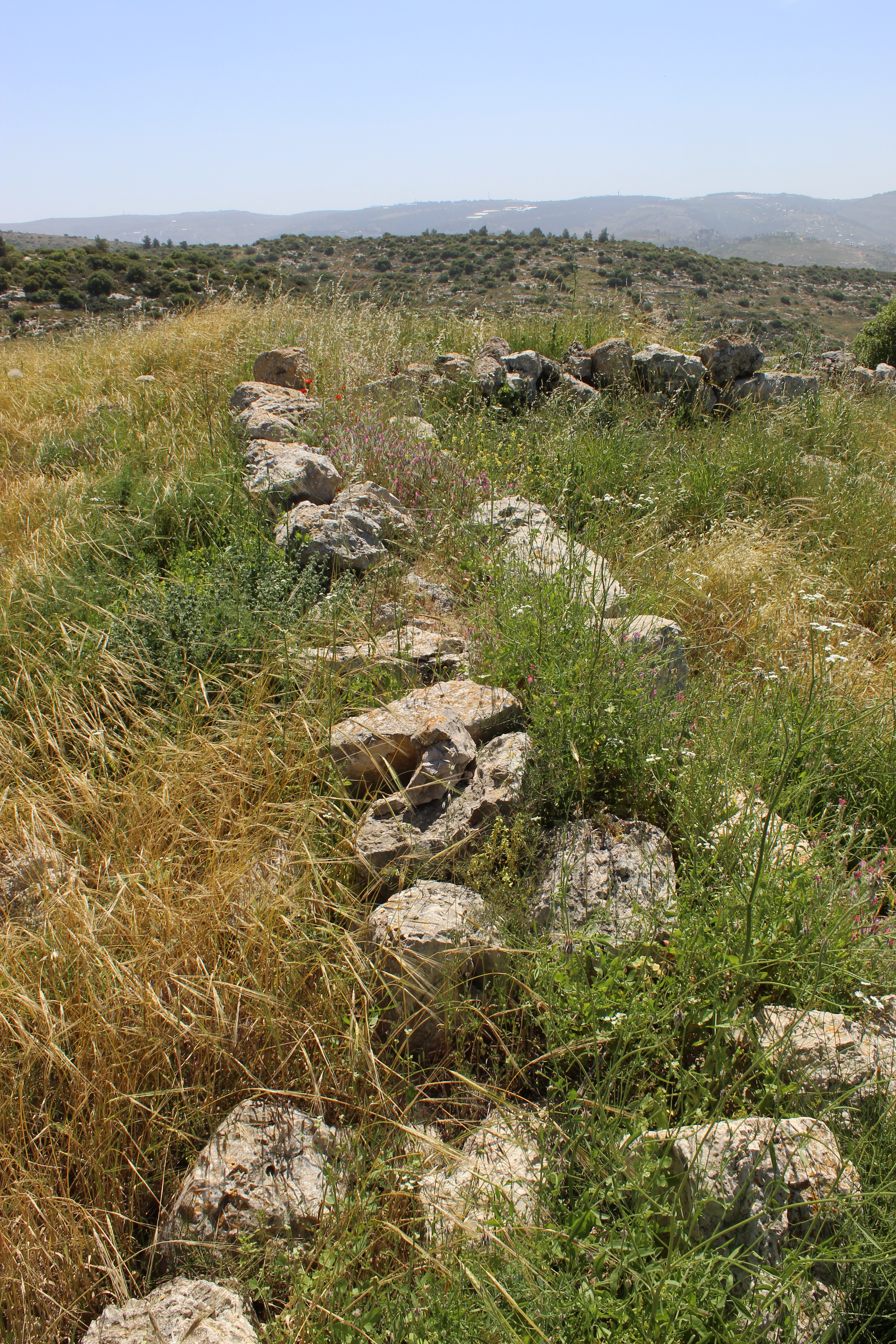
Remains of thick wall at Khirbet et-Tibbâneh

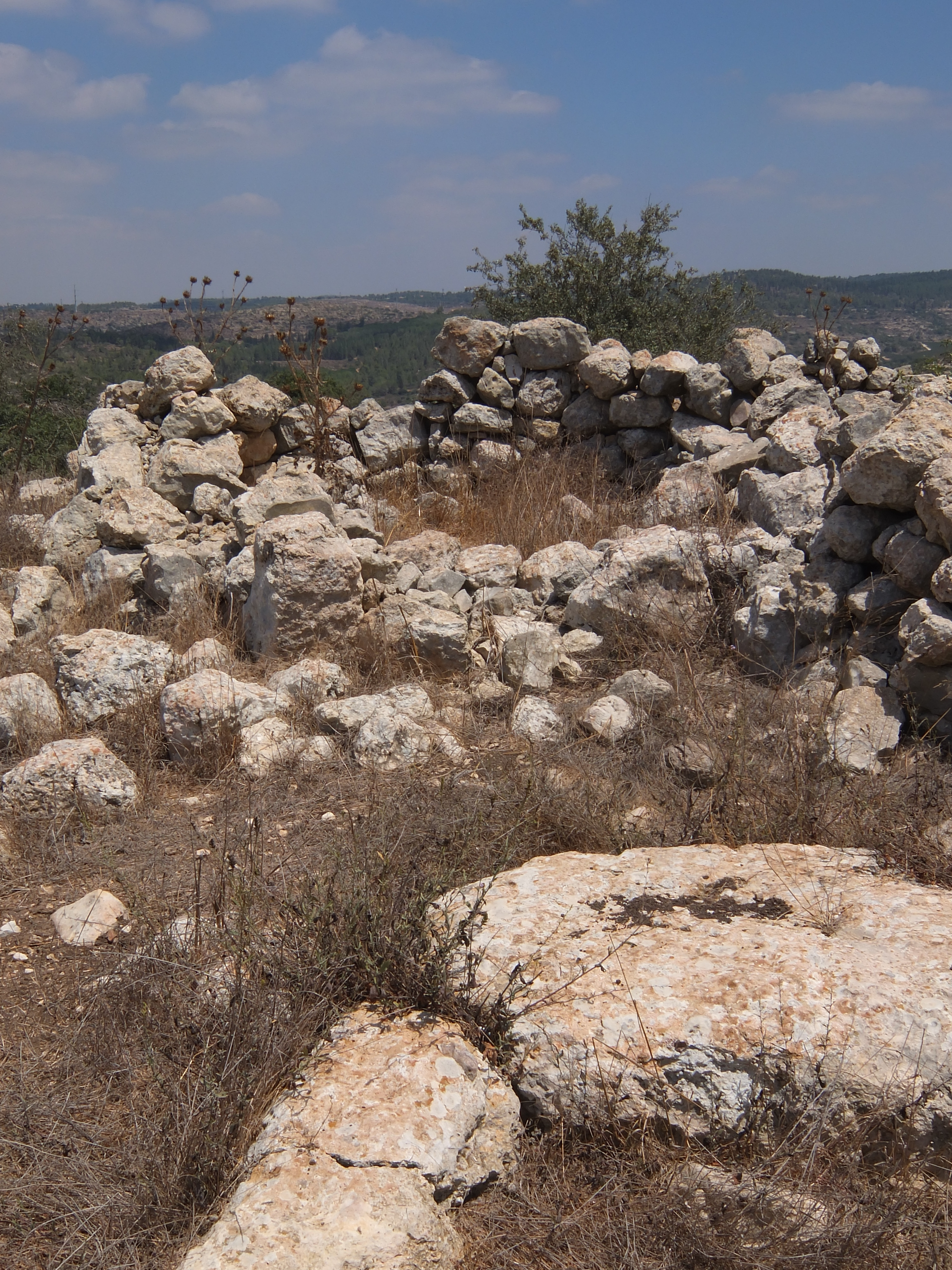
Ruin of Timnath (Tibbaneh)

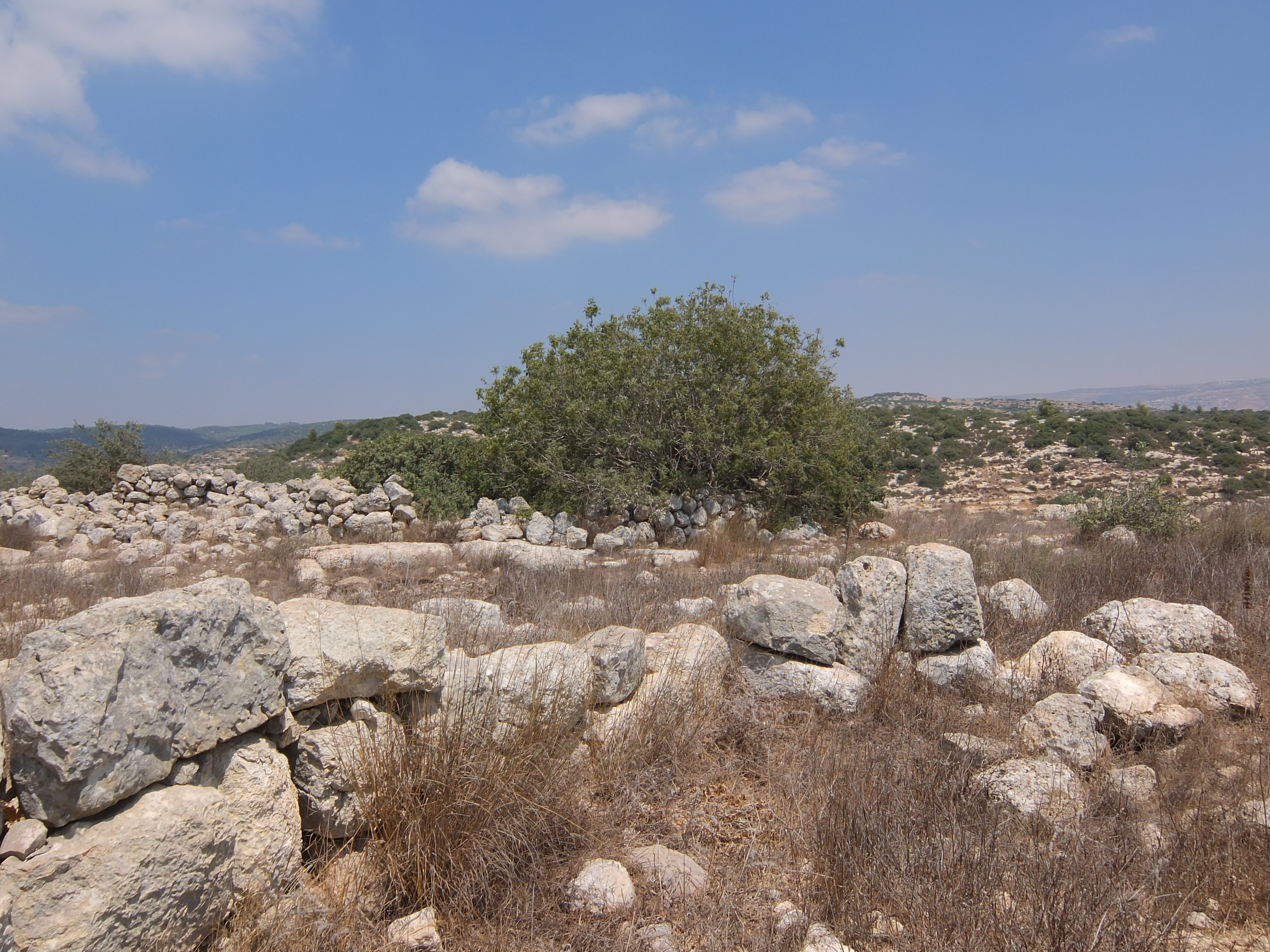
Site at Khirbet et-Tibbâneh

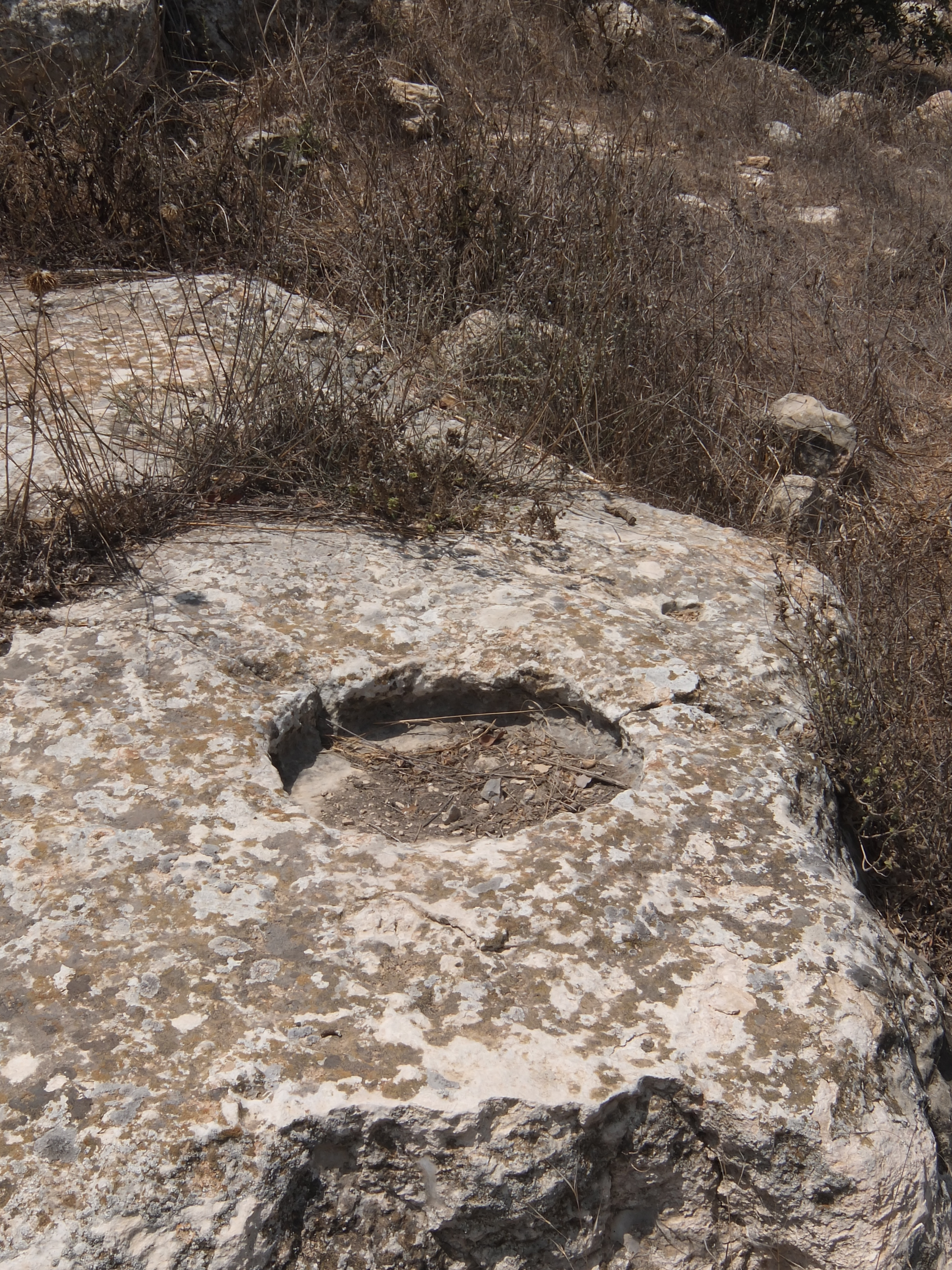
Stone at Khirbet et-Tibbâneh

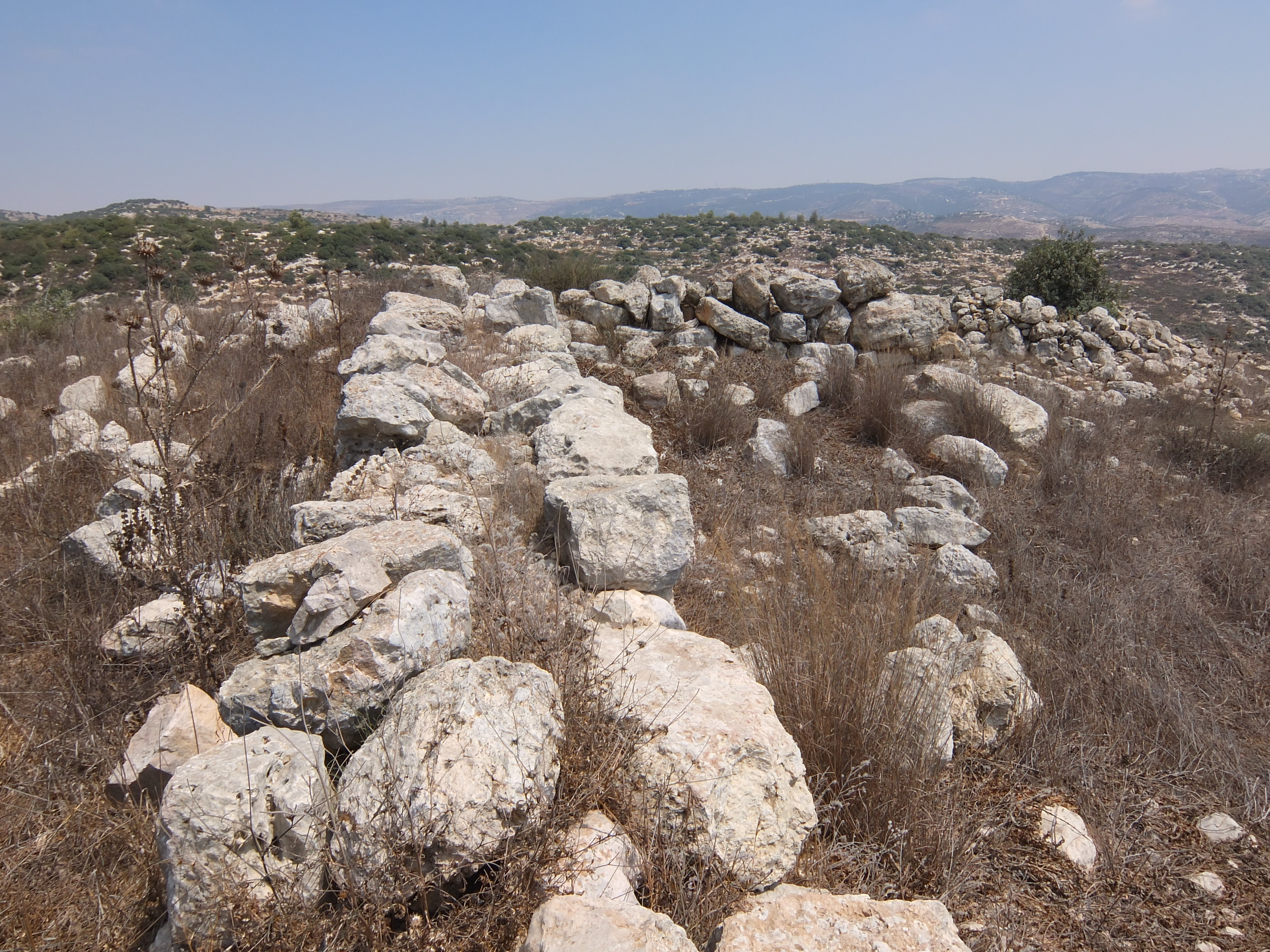
Thick wall at Timnath ruin

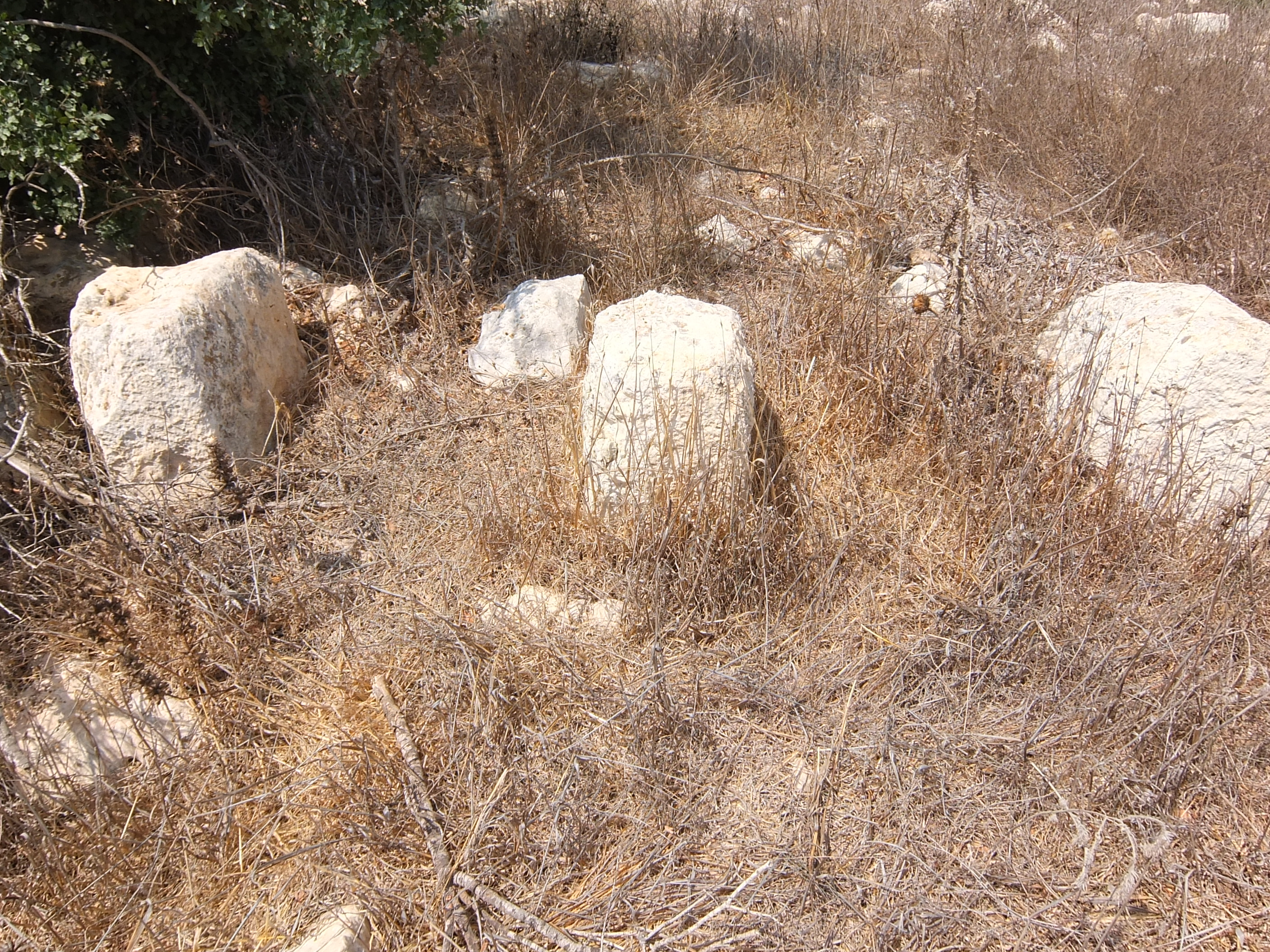
Three foundation stones

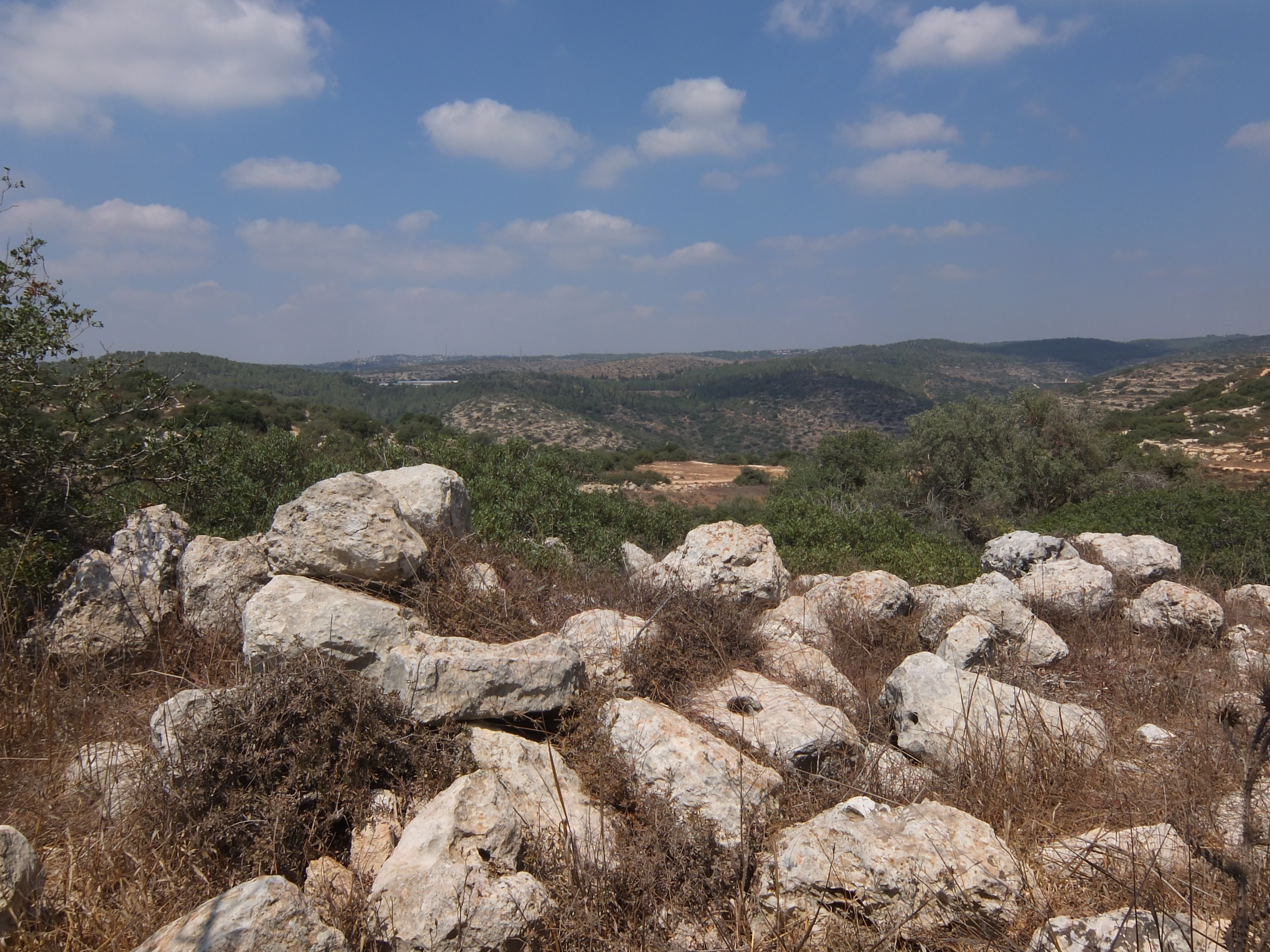
View looking north from ruin

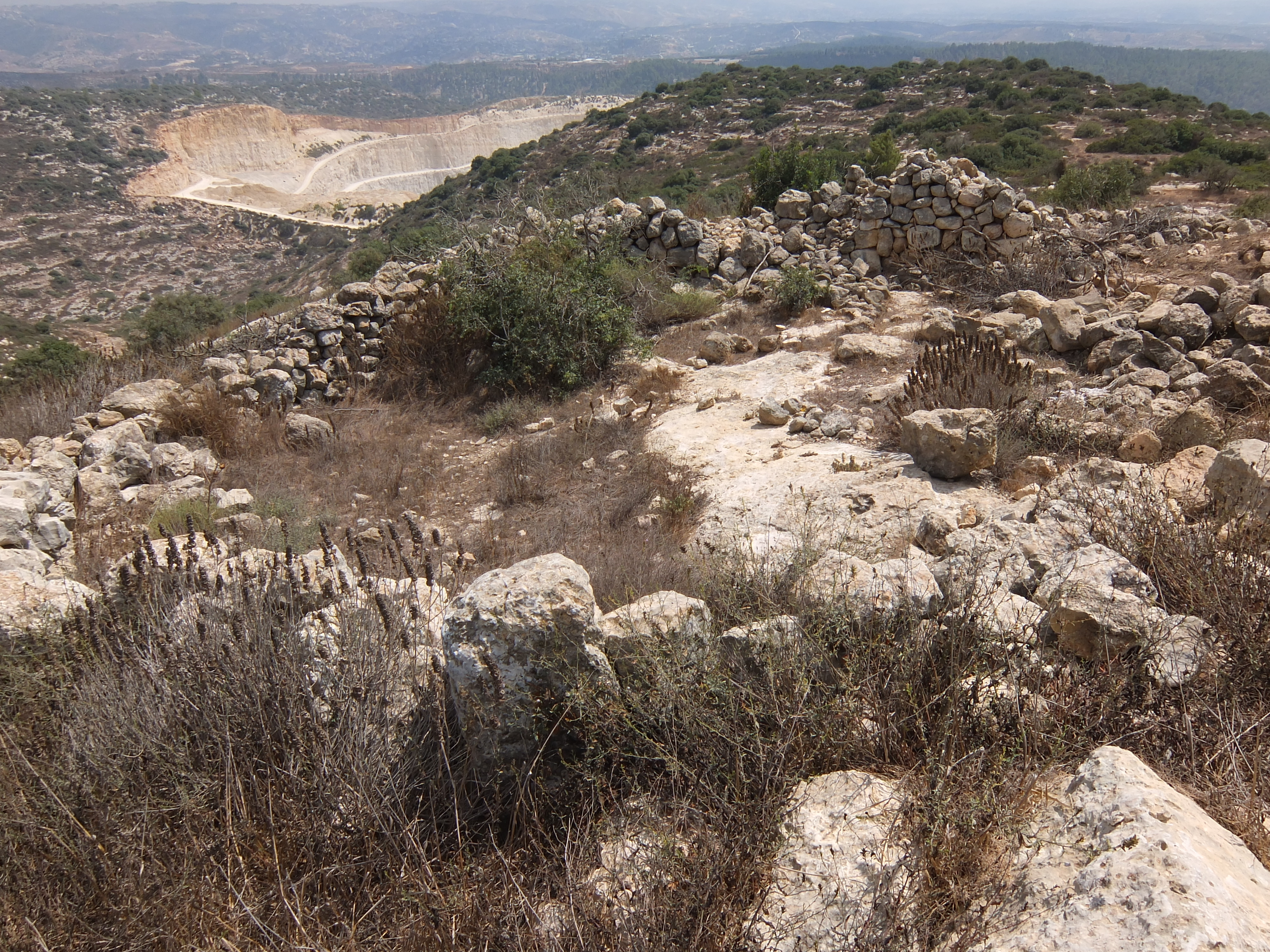
View looking south

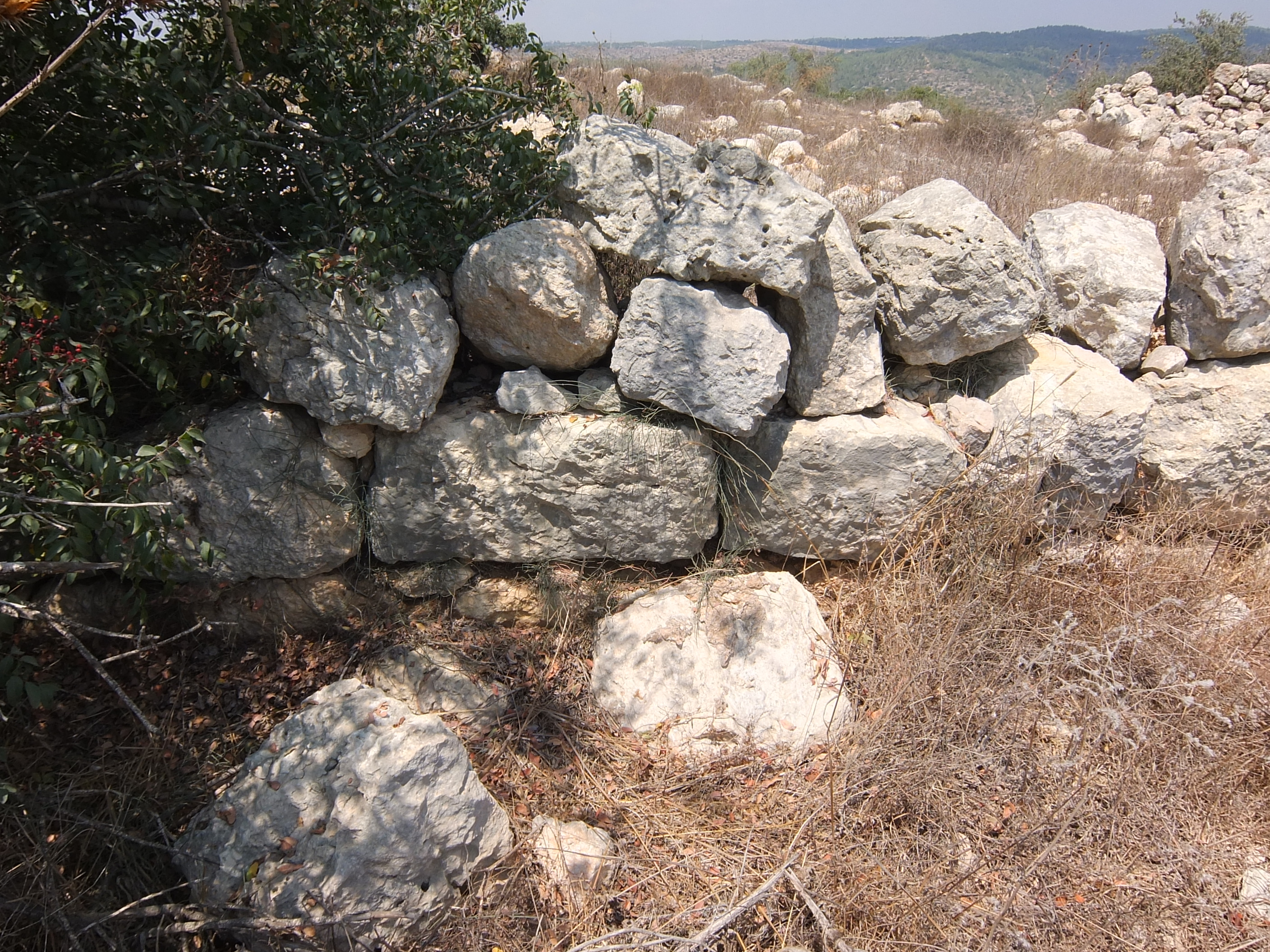
Walled structure

== Bibliography ==
- Abel, F.M. (1938). Géographie de la Palestine (in French). Vol. 2. Paris: Gabalda.
- Avi-Yonah, M. (1963). Historical Geography of Palestine (in Hebrew). Jerusalem: Bialik Institute.
- Avi-Yonah, M. (1976). Gazetteer of Roman Palestine, Qedem - Monographs of the Institute of Archaeology [5]. Vol. 2. Jerusalem: Hebrew University of Jerusalem.
- Avi-Yonah, M. (1977). The Holy Land from the Persian to the Arab Conquests (536 B.C. to A.D. 640) – A Historical Geography. Grand Rapids. ISBN 978-0801000102.
- Clermont-Ganneau, C. (1875), The Site of the City of Adullam, Palestine Exploration Fund Quarterly Statement 7.3 (July), pp. 168–177
- Clermont-Ganneau, C.S. (1896). Archaeological Researches in Palestine During the Years 1873–1874. Vol. 2. London: Palestine Exploration Fund.
- Conder, C.R.; Kitchener, H.H. (1883). The Survey of Western Palestine: Memoirs of the Topography, Orography, Hydrography, and Archaeology. Vol. 3. London: Committee of the Palestine Exploration Fund.
- Emerton, J.A. (1975). "Some Problems in Genesis XXXVIII". Vetus Testamentum. 25 (2): 338–361. doi:10.2307/1516950. JSTOR 1516950.
- Freedman, D.N.; Myers, Allen C. (31 December 2000). Eerdmans Dictionary of the Bible. Amsterdam University Press. ISBN 978-90-5356-503-2.
- Gibson, S.; Negev, Avraham, eds. (2001), Archaeological Encyclopedia of the Holy Land, New York / London, ISBN 0-8264-1316-1
- Guérin, V. (1869). Description Géographique Historique et Archéologique de la Palestine (in French). Vol. 1: Judee, pt. 2. Paris: L'Imprimerie Nationale.
- Kallai, Zechariah (1960). Northern Boundaries of Judah, from the Settlement of the Tribes Until the Beginning of the Hasmonaean Period (in Hebrew). Jerusalem.
- Kelm, G.L.; Mazar, A. (1984). "Timnah: A Biblical City in the Sorek Valley". Archaeology. 37 (3): 58–59, 78–79. JSTOR 41729127.
- Klein, S. (1922). Eretz Yisrael: Geography of Israel for High Schools and for the People (in Hebrew). Vienna: Menorah.
- Klein, S. (1939). Eretz Yehudah (The Land of Judah). Tel-Aviv. (Hebrew)
- Mazar, A. (1981). "The Excavations of Khirbet Abu et-Twain and the System of Iron Age Fortresses in Judah". Eretz-Israel (in Hebrew). 15.
- Mazar, A. (1993), "Abu Tuwein, Khirbet", in Stern, E. (ed.), The New Encyclopedia of Archaeological Excavations in the Holy Land, vol. 1, Jerusalem: Israel Exploration Society, ISBN 965-220-209-6
- McGarvey, J.W. (2002). Lands of the Bible: A Geographical and Topographical Description of Palestine, with Letters of Travel in Egypt, Syria, Asia Minor, and Greece. Adamant Media Corporation. ISBN 978-1-4021-9277-7.
- Meltzer, Muli, ed. (2000), Encyclopaedia Mapa - A Comprehensive Gazetteer of Israel Today, vol. 7, Tel-Aviv, ISBN 965-7009-92-8 (OCLC 174742987) (Hebrew)
- Neubauer, A. (1868). Géographie du Talmud (in French). Paris: Michel Lévy Frères.
- Palmer, E. H. (1881). The Survey of Western Palestine: Arabic and English Name Lists Collected During the Survey by Lieutenants Conder and Kitchener, R. E. Transliterated and Explained by E.H. Palmer. Committee of the Palestine Exploration Fund.
- Press, I., ed. (1955), "תמנה א", A Topographical-Historical Encyclopaedia of Palestine, vol. 4, Jerusalem: Rubin Mass, p. 974
- Rainey, A.F. (1983). "The Biblical Shephelah of Judah". Bulletin of the American Schools of Oriental Research. 251 (251). The University of Chicago Press on behalf of The American Schools of Oriental Research: 1–22. doi:10.2307/1356823. JSTOR 1356823. S2CID 163604987.
- Robinson, Edward; Smith, Eli (1841). Biblical Researches in Palestine, Mount Sinai and Arabia Petraea: A Journal of Travels in the year 1838. Vol. 2. Boston: Crocker & Brewster.
- Robinson, E.; Smith, E. (1860). Biblical Researches in Palestine and in the Adjacent Regions: A Journal of Travels in the year 1838. Vol. 2. Boston: Crocker & Brewster.
- Schürer, E. (1891). Geschichte des jüdischen Volkes im Zeitalter Jesu Christi [A History of the Jewish People in the Time of Jesus Christ]. Vol. 1. Translated by Miss Taylor. New York: Charles Scribner's Sons. pp. 158–159 (note 438).
- Tristram, H.B. (1897). Bible Places: Or, The Topography of the Holy Land: a Succinct Account of All the Places, Rivers, and Mountains of the Land of Israel. London.
