= Bacchides (general) =

General and governor of the Greek Seleucid Empire

Bacchides (Greek: Βακχίδης) (fl. 2nd-century BCE) was a Syrian-Greek general (strategos), governor, friend and advisor (philos) of King Demetrius I Soter of the Seleucid Empire. The Seleucid Empire was one of the Greek successor states (ruled by the diadochi) founded after the conquests of Alexander the Great, and was centered in Syria and Babylonia in the Hellenistic era.

Bacchides is only known from the books of Maccabees (1 Maccabees, possibly 2 Maccabees as well) and the works of the historian Josephus.

== Depiction in 1 Maccabees ==
The main source on Bacchides is the book 1 Maccabees. The work was written in the Hasmonean kingdom after the success of the Maccabean Revolt against the Seleucid Empire, and is thus a source hostile to Bacchides. Nevertheless, the book is open about the successes Bacchides achieved on behalf of the government.

So the king chose Bacchides, one of the king's Friends, governor of the province Beyond the River; he was a great man in the kingdom and was faithful to the king. He sent him, and with him he sent the ungodly Alcimus, whom he made high priest; and he commanded him to take vengeance on the Israelites.

— 1 Maccabees 7:8-9 (NRSV)

According to Chapter 7, Demetrius sent Bacchides in 161 BCE to Judea with an army in order to invest Alcimus with the office of High Priest of Israel. This mission succeeded; the book of 1 Maccabees does not report any challenge to it, perhaps because the Maccabees were still rebuilding after their defeat at the Battle of Beth Zechariah. The book then reports a negotiation took place between Alcimus and the Hasideans, but Alcimus broke his oath, and seized and executed sixty of the Hasideans. Bacchides then left Jerusalem, encamped at a place called Beth Zaith, and then arrested and executed some locals. He then returned to the king at the capital. The reference to "Beyond the River" as where Bacchides ruled is more a linguistic quirk; the style of 1 Maccabees heavily uses archaic references and a biblical style, and so uses the Persian term for area west of Mesopatamia rather than the Greek one ("Syria").

When Demetrius heard that Nicanor and his army had fallen in battle, he sent Bacchides and Alcimus into the land of Judah a second time, and with them the right wing of the army. They went by the road that leads to Gilgal and encamped against Mesaloth in Arbela, and they took it and killed many people.

— 1 Maccabees 9:1-2 (NRSV)

Bacchides next appears in Chapter 9. After Nicanor's defeat at the Battle of Adasa, Bacchides is dispatched to quell the rebellious region. He engages with the rebel army at the Battle of Elasa, and wins a key victory. The leader of the Judeans, Judas Maccabeus, was killed, and the Maccabees were forced to retreat. The timing of these two events is somewhat uncertain and disputed; the work says that Adasa was in the month of Adar, and Elasa was in the following month of Nisan. Many scholars presume that Adasa was in 161 BCE, while Bacchides expedition happened in 160 BCE, suggesting a long 13-month gap compared to the narrative seemingly suggesting Bacchides was sent out immediately afterward; however, if both battles happened in the same year, this would be an exceptionally fast response to have the expedition of Bacchides ready to go and attack immediately after news of the defeat reached the capital, given travel times in antiquity.

After the death of Judas, the renegades emerged in all parts of Israel; all the wrongdoers reappeared. In those days a very great famine occurred, and the country went over to their side. Bacchides chose the godless and put them in charge of the country. They made inquiry and searched for the friends of Judas, and brought them to Bacchides, who took vengeance on them and made sport of them. So there was great distress in Israel, such as had not been since the time that prophets ceased to appear among them.

— 1 Maccabees 9:23-27 (NRSV)

With Judas's defeat, Bacchides re-established Seleucid authority in Judea. The rebels nominated Judas's brother Jonathan Apphus to lead them with Judas's death, and seem to have fled to Tekoa on the border of Idumea near the Jordan River. 1 Maccabees then describes a battle that the Maccabees won against Bacchides' forces on the Jordan River, with the government forces declining to attempt to follow the rebels across the river. Still, while the rebel movement would survive in the countryside, they could not retake the cities. Bacchides then built and established fortifications with Seleucid garrisons around Judea. He is described as fortifying Jericho, Emmaus, Beth-horon, Beth-el, Thamnata (Timnatha), Pharathon, Tephon, Beth-zur, and Gazara. Bacchides also orders the taking hostages of the sons of various important families of the Judean elite to the Acra citadel of Jerusalem as a guarantee of good behavior. Around 159 BCE, Alcimus died; Bacchides returned to Syria for a period of two years afterward, and Judea saw peace.

In 157 BCE, there was a new incident. 1 Maccabees describes Judean Hellenists as stirring up trouble and convincing Bacchides to come back to Judea a third time to try his luck against Jonathan's rebels. There is a new wave of fighting, but Jonathan's forces hold out. Additionally, Simon Thassi, brother of Judas and Jonathan, is also described as taking part in the fighting, although there is suspicion that this may be a later addition to the text by some scholars. Jonathan and Bacchides come to a peace treaty, and the fighting stops between the Greek government and the Maccabees. Bacchides is also described as being frustrated with the "lawless" Hellenist Jews and executing several himself for their failures. As part of the peace deal, Bacchides swears to never move against Jonathan again, and appears to actually uphold his end of the deal, which is not at all guaranteed given 1 Maccabees' depiction of many such promises from others as untrustworthy. While the open fighting of armies stopped, 1 Maccabees hints that violence would continue, albeit on a more localized level. It writes that while "the sword ceased from Israel" that "Jonathan (...) began to judge the people; and he destroyed the godless out of Israel."

== In other literature ==
In the book 2 Maccabees, a person named "Bacchides" is briefly mentioned as working with a Seleucid commander named Timothy. Jonathan A. Goldstein writes that there is not enough evidence to tell if this Bacchides is the same person mentioned in 1 Maccabees, while Robert Doran argues that they are probably not the same person.

The Jewish historian Josephus wrote of the Maccabean Revolt in both The Jewish War and Jewish Antiquities. The Jewish War mentions a Seleucid commander named Bacchides who is in charge of the garrison at Jerusalem at the start of the persecution (around ~168–167 BC) who began torturing eminent citizens to indulge in his own brutal barbarity. His excesses provoke "Matthias, the son of Asamonaeus" (Mattathias) and his five sons to kill Bacchides with cleavers, after which Matthias flees into the wilderness and begins the Maccabean Revolt. This account is generally assumed to be untrustworthy and erroneous, and was a result of Josephus conflating Mattathias killing a Seleucid official in Modein (not Jerusalem) with Bacchides being the name of a Seleucid official. Antiquities seems to be largely based on 1 Maccabees, although it includes information at times brought from other sources. For Bacchides, however, Antiquities largely matches the account of 1 Maccabees, and does not add any unique details.

Bacchides acquired a number of variants of his name in other languages. In the Syriac translation of 1 Maccabees, Bacchides, through an error in transcription, is called "Bicrius" instead of "Bacdius". In Megillat Antiochus, a rabbinic Judaism version of the Hanukkah story written around the 2nd century CE, he is called Bagris, or Bogores.
