= Adasa =

Location in ancient Judea

Coordinates: 31°50′N 35°14′E

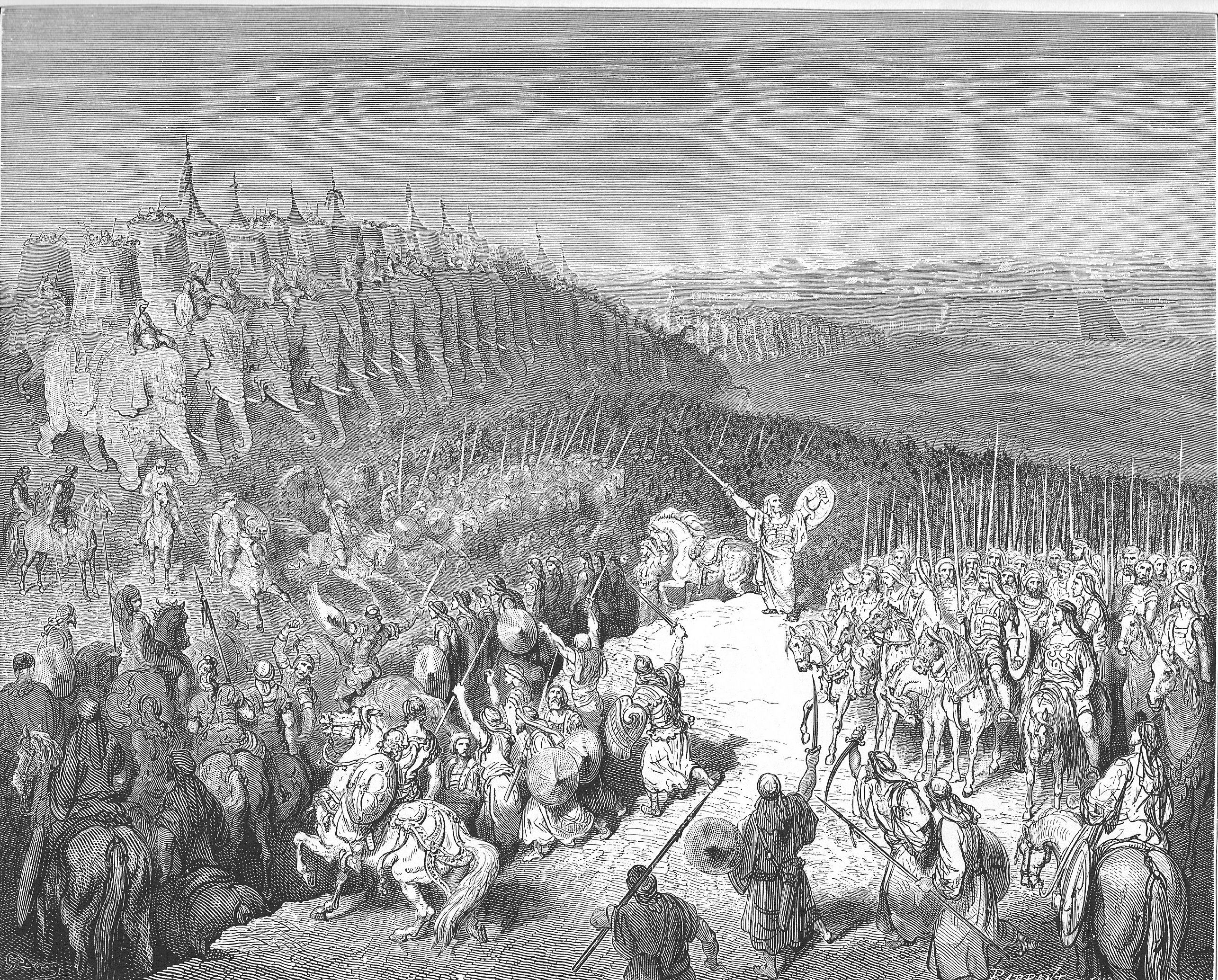

Adasa (Ancient Greek: Αδασα, romanized: Adasa) is a place referred to in the book 1 Maccabees, Chapter 7. The Aramaic language name used by the locals is not known, but was probably something like Ḥadaša. According to the passage, it was the site of the Battle of Adasa in year 151 of the Seleucid era, equivalent to 161 BCE. The battle was a victory for Judas Maccabeus's rebels in the Maccabean Revolt against the Seleucid Empire, and the Greek commander Nicanor died in battle.

Adasa was near Beth Horon, and somewhere in the hills north of Jerusalem and south of Ramallah. The book 1 Maccabees survived only in Greek form, making it somewhat tricky to find other references to Adasa. The Septuagint translation of Joshua 15:37 into Greek includes a place called "Adasa", suggesting that "Hadashah" in Hebrew was an equivalent. However, the Joshua reference is to a town in the southern Judean lowland, which is the wrong direction, suggesting the Joshua reference was to a different place with a similar or identical name. The Eruvin tractate of the Talmud refers to a "Hadasha in Judea" as a tiny settlement of just around 50 inhabitants. The historian Josephus's work Jewish Antiquities uses 1 Maccabees as a source, but adds that Adasa was around 30 stadia (equivalent to 3 miles) from Beth Horon.

Some have identified Adasa with Khirbet 'Adasa, an archaeological site located 5 kilometers north of Jerusalem.
