= George L. Kelm =

American archaeologist (1931–2019)

George L. Kelm (1931–2019) was Professor Emeritus of Archaeology and Biblical Backgrounds at Southwestern Baptist Theological Seminary, Fort Worth, Texas. While serving there and at New Orleans Baptist Theological Seminary, he and Amihai Mazar uncovered Timnah.

== Education ==
- New York University - Ph.D.
- Institute of Holy Land Studies, Jerusalem

== Career ==
Kelm was serving as professor of Biblical Backgrounds and Archaeology at New Orleans Baptist Theological Seminary when he and Amihai Mazar uncovered biblical Timnah, Tel Batash in the Sorek Valley of Israel through 1977-1979. Excavations at the site continued until 1989.

== Personal life ==
Originally from Alberta, Kelm and his wife Linda Kelm immigrated to the United States, becoming U.S. citizens.

George was born February 26, 1931, and died April 25, 2019.

== Publications ==
- Kelm, George L., Mazar, Amihai. (1995). Timnah: a Biblical city in the Sorek Valley. Winona Lake, IN. Eisenbrauns. ISBN 0-931464-97-8
- Kelm, George L. "Escape to Conflict: A Biblical and Archaeological Approach to the Hebrew Exodus and Settlement in Canaan". Biblical Archaeology Review. 18.6 (November/December 1992), 8, 10.
- Kelm, George L, Mazar, Amihai. "Three 97y8 putoSeasons of Excavations at Tel Batash—Biblical Timnah," Bulletin of the American Schools of Oriental Research, 248 (1982): 29-32.
