= Battle of Adasa =

160 BCE battle

- Part of the Maccabean Revolt
Date	March, 161 BC
Location	Adasa 31.8333°N 35.2333°E
Result	Jewish victory

Belligerents
Jewish rebels	Seleucid Empire

Commanders and leaders
Judas Maccabeus	Nicanor †

Strength
Unknown (See #Analysis)	Around 9,000 soldiers?

Casualties and losses
Unknown	Heavy

The Battle of Adasa was fought during the Maccabean revolt on the 13th of the month Adar (late winter, equivalent to March), 161 BC at Adasa (Hebrew: חדשה), near Beth-horon. It was a battle between the rebel Maccabees of Judas Maccabeus (Judah Maccabee) and the Seleucid Empire, whose army was led by Nicanor. The Maccabees won the battle after killing Nicanor early in the fighting. The battle came after a period of political maneuvering over several months where the peace deal established a year earlier by Lysias was tested by the new High Priest Alcimus, the new military governor Nicanor, and the Maccabee leader Judas Maccabeus.

The date of the battle in the Hebrew calendar, 13 Adar, was celebrated as Yom Nicanor (Day of Nicanor) to commemorate the victory.

== Primary sources ==
Nicanor's military governance of Judea, the Battle of Caphar-salama, and the Battle of Adasa are recorded in the book of 1 Maccabees (1 Maccabees 7:26–50), the book of 2 Maccabees (2 Maccabees 14:12–33, 2 Maccabees 15:1–36), and in Josephus's Antiquities of the Jews Book 12, Chapter 10. The Battle of Caphar-salama is portrayed with fairly few details; either it was a short and one-sided affair, the author of 1 Maccabees was not an eye-witness to it, or both. Slightly more details are written of the Battle of Adasa, but largely of the geographic region it took place in. The writers instead focused more on the political maneuvering between Nicanor, Alcimus, and Judas.

== Nicanor's governorship ==
In 162 BC, Regent Lysias led an expedition to restore government control of Judea and relieve a siege of the Acra citadel in Jerusalem. After winning the Battle of Beth Zechariah, the Maccabees were forced to retreat. Political considerations hastened Lysias's return to the Seleucid capital of Antioch, however. Despite fending off a challenge from a Seleucid leader called Philip, a far greater threat arrived soon after: Demetrius I Soter, who escaped from captivity in Rome with the help of the Greek historian Polybius and returned to Syria. Demetrius was the son of Seleucus IV, and Antiochus IV taking the throne after Seleucus IV's death in 175 BC had been perceived as a usurpation by some. Additionally, Demetrius was a man in his prime, around 24 years old, while King Antiochus V Eupator was still a child. Demetrius successfully swayed the Greek leaders of Antioch to his side, took the throne, and ordered the arrest and execution of Antiochus V and Lysias. This would sour Seleucid relations with the Roman Republic; Rome began offering tentative offers of support and assistance to any potential sources of rebellion and disunity within the Seleucid Empire, such as Timarchus, Ptolemaus of Commagene, and the Maccabees.

Demetrius's first act with regards to the situation in Judea was to send a new military expedition there under Seleucid general Bacchides. The size and scope of the expedition is unknown, but one of its purposes was to install Alcimus as High Priest of Judea. Alcimus was a moderate Hellenizer who worked to split off Jewish support of the Maccabees, apparently to some success. Bacchides left, but tensions between the Maccabees in the countryside, the moderate Hellenist Jews in the cities, and the Greeks continued. The books of Maccabees accuse Alcimus of arranging a slaughter of moderate Hasideans. Against this backdrop, Nicanor was appointed strategos (general / governor) of the region, likely ruling from the Acra. Nicanor had previously been a commander of Seleucid war elephants, and had taken part in the Battle of Emmaus four years earlier. On his way to assume the governorship, he apparently fought a skirmish with Maccabee forces under Simon Thassi (Simeon) at a place called Dessau or Caphar-dessau; Nicanor won and forced the Maccabees into retreat. As part of his governorship, Nicanor apparently attempted to negotiate with and even befriend Judas, according to 2 Maccabees. Judas was even given an official government role (diadokhos, "deputy" or "representative"), and would tentatively be involved in the administration and management of Judea. A rivalry between Nicanor and Alcimus would undo this potential warming of relations. Alcimus, perhaps worried of being replaced or his authority undermined, complained to the authorities in Antioch. New orders from Demetrius at the behest of this rivalry forced Nicanor to move against Judas more aggressively. Judas realized something had changed, and laid low. Regardless of whether the original negotiations were sincere or not, the negotiations now broke down, and Nicanor made moves to have Judas arrested. Judas fled back to the countryside where his remaining army waited.

== Caphar-salama and Adasa ==
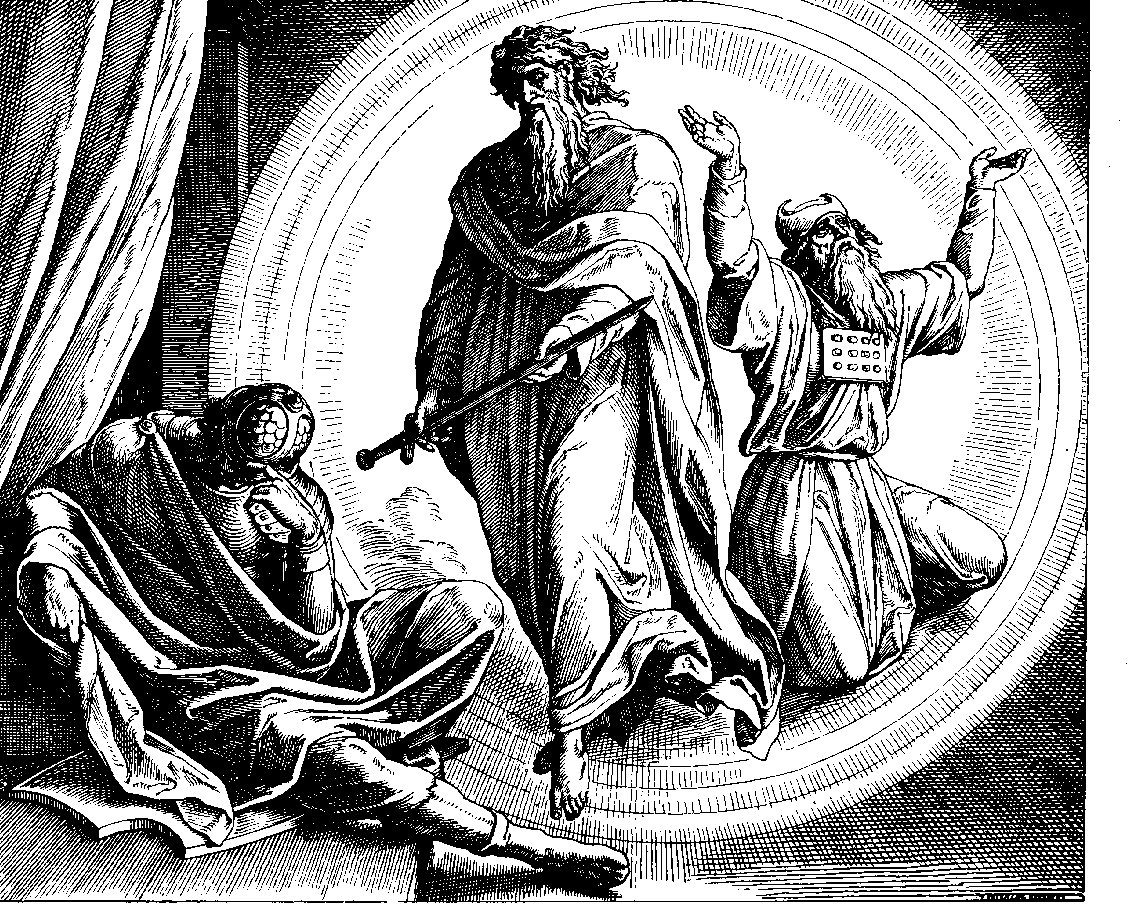
Judas is presented with a divine golden sword while asleep. Woodcut by Julius Schnorr von Carolsfeld from the 1860 Die Bibel in Bildern

Nicanor left Jerusalem with a small force to track down Judas and the rebels. At Caphar-salama, a skirmish was fought; the Seleucids suffered 500 casualties, (Note: Most ancient manuscripts of 1 Maccabees say "5,000" casualties. This is likely a scribal error from copying later unknowingly repeated; the Codex Sinaiticus, the oldest extant source, uses "500".) and retreated back to Jerusalem. Allegedly, Nicanor then blasphemed at the Second Temple; he threatened the priests there to help him find Judas, or else he would return and burn the Temple down. The truth of this matter may be unknown as well due to the hostility of the surviving sources to Nicanor; the priests at the Temple would presumably have been Alcimus's subordinates, although according to 2 Maccabees it had been Alcimus who forced Nicanor's hand in the first place. Whether Nicanor really did turn on his own allies in a self-destructive frenzy is unclear, but regardless, he gained the hatred of the rebels.

Nicanor rode out again and camped in the region of Beth-horon, northwest of Jerusalem, to meet up with Seleucid reinforcements traveling from Samaria. He likely had at least some heavy infantry with him. The rebels set their forces against him at Adasa. According to 2 Maccabees 15, Judas inspired his troops by relating to them a dream-vision he had experienced, wherein the Prophet Jeremiah presented a gold sword to him and said, "Take this holy sword, a gift from God, with which you will strike down your adversaries." The battle appears to have been a direct frontal confrontation rather than an ambush or surprise attack; 1 Maccabees simply says that "armies met in battle", unlike phrasings suggesting surprise in earlier battles of the Revolt. Nicanor was killed very early in the battle, rattling the Seleucid force from the loss of its commander. Hellenistic commanders typically fought in the cavalry on the right wing and the force was comparatively small, so Nicanor would likely have been easy to find had Judas planned on attacking him directly.

The Seleucid troops retreated toward Gazara, the nearest Seleucid fortress to the west around 30 kilometers (19 mi) away. The Jewish army followed in pursuit, and Jewish partisans in the nearby towns harried their retreat, inflicting significant casualties on the fleeing government army.

== Aftermath ==
Nicanor's body was desecrated after the battle. His head and right hand were cut off, originally a Persian punishment, and posted for display near Jerusalem. This was to raise the morale of the rebels as the first truly high-ranking officer slain by the Maccabees. Judas was also able to undertake negotiations with the Romans from a position of greater strength, and extracted a weak promise of potential Roman support in the future against Demetrius.

King Demetrius would suppress the rebellion of Timarchus in the eastern satrapies around early 160 BC, freeing up soldiers for other tasks such as suppressing the Judean unrest. Despite the victory at Adasa, in a year Judas Maccabeus would be defeated and killed at the Battle of Elasa.

== Analysis ==
The location of Dessau, where Simon fought Nicanor before he assumed the governorship, is unknown. The story is only related in 2 Maccabees, which provides no further geographic clues. Some scholars speculate that the epitomist who abridged 2 Maccabees may have confused Caphar-salama with Caphar-dessau and they were the same battle, but the terms are not particularly alike, and 2 Maccabees describes the battle at Dessau as a rebel defeat while 1 Maccabees describes Caphar-salama as a rebel victory.

1 Maccabees and 2 Maccabees disagree on the extent and sincerity of the negotiations between Nicanor and Judas. In 1 Maccabees, the negotiations were solely a trap by the evil Nicanor that Judas easily evaded; in 2 Maccabees, they only fell apart after the intervention of High Priest Alcimus, who was hostile to Judas. Scholars who favor 1 Maccabees believe that the depiction of Nicanor as initially sincere and a friend of Judas is done solely for literary purposes to make a better "tragic" story of downfall, and thus cannot be trusted to be historical. Scholars who favor 2 Maccabees cite the later Seleucid negotiations with Maccabee leaders as evidence that there is nothing strange about the negotiations described before Adasa; additionally, 1 Maccabees seems to have less knowledge of Seleucid internal politics and depicts nearly all Syrian leaders as simply evil opponents of Judaism, so it is the source that is less trustworthy on this matter.

The fighting at the Battle of Adasa was more small-scale than the dramatic Battle of Beth Zechariah, where the Regent's personal army had fought a Maccabee army rallied while they had control of all of Judea. Josephus writes that Nicanor had 9,000 soldiers at this battle. 1 Maccabees writes that the Maccabees had access to 3,000 soldiers in this battle; Josephus writes a mere 2,000. Historian Bezalel Bar-Kochva believes that these estimates for the size of the Judean army are too low - Judas appeared to be an able military commander who confidently chose this battle as a winnable one. He would not have gambled the remaining rebel forces in an open battle in which he was badly outnumbered; if Judas really had been outnumbered, he would have fought in a narrow pass rather than Adasa, such as the strategy used at the earlier Battle of Beth Horon. Eduard Meyer is skeptical of Josephus's estimate, suggesting that Nicanor had a few thousand men at most, hence 2 Maccabees reporting he had impressed local Jews into the army to bolster its numbers. 2 Maccabees also reports enemy casualties of 35,000, a grossly inflated number discounted as myth-making to make Judas's victory seem more impressive.

According to 2 Maccabees, the Seleucids had war elephants at this battle. This is considered doubtful and likely a temporal mix-up, as 2 Maccabees was probably written later than 1 Maccabees; according to Greek and Roman sources, a Roman delegation enforcing the Treaty of Apamea hamstrung the Seleucid war elephants in 163 or 162 BC. If some elephants had escaped the Romans, perhaps from staying in the coastal region of Paralia rather than returning to Antioch, they were likely very few; 1 Maccabees is silent on the presence of any elephants.

The story of Jeremiah bestowing a divine sword to Judas as a sign of God's favor may possibly be influenced by a synthesis of Egyptian cultural beliefs and the Jewish religion. The epitomist of 2 Maccabees was an Egyptian Jew, and a common motif of authority was to show the pharaoh holding or about to wield a royal sword. This story would be bolstering Judas's king-like authority as leader, albeit with a Jewish spin in using the famous prophet Jeremiah.

The date of the battle on 13 Adar is described, but not the year. A year of 161 BC implies that Nicanor's governorship was rather short, only lasting a few months. However, a year of 160 BC implies that there was practically no time between Adasa and Bacchides' second expedition in 160 BC that would lead to the Battle of Elasa, which happened in the month of Nisan, the month immediately after Adar.

== Legacy ==
A Jewish festival, Yom Nicanor (Day of Nicanor), was created to honor the victory at Adasa, the demise of the disliked Nicanor who had threatened to burn the Temple, and the triumphant return of Judas Maccabeus to Jerusalem after a period of Seleucid rule. The date it is held is 13 Adar, the day of the Battle of Adasa. The Day of Nicanor was included in a 1st century Jewish calendar of special days, Megillat Ta'anit. Later rabbinical writings, such as in the Ta'anit tractate of the Talmud, focus more on Nicanor's arrogance and threats backfiring on him, and omit mention of Judas Maccabeus. This may have been an attempt to counterbalance the Hasmonean aggrandizement of the book of 1 Maccabees and avoid hero-worship of Judas.
