= Timnah =

Biblical city in the Sorek Valley of central Israel

Timnah/Tel Batash
- תל בטש or תמנה (Hebrew)
- תמנתה
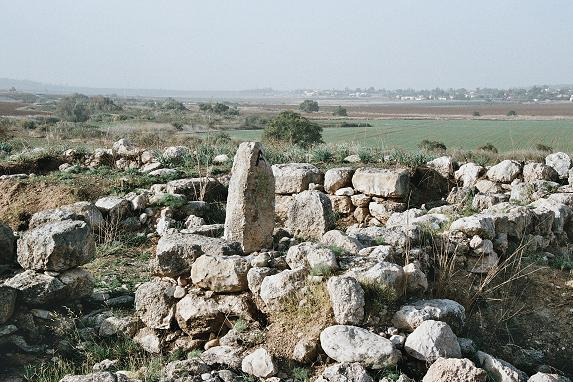

- Location within Israel
- 31°47′06″N 34°54′40″E
- Periods: Middle Bronze Age
- Location: Israel

Site notes
- Area: 10 acres (4.0 ha)
- Excavation dates: 1979–1990s
- Archaeologists: Amihai Mazar & George L. Kelm

Timnath or Timnah was a Philistine city in Canaan that is mentioned in the Hebrew Bible in Judges 14 and in connection with Samson. Modern archaeologists identify the ancient site with a tell lying on a flat, alluvial plain, located in the Sorek Valley ca. 7 kilometres (4.3 mi) north-west of Beit Shemesh, near moshav Tal Shahar in Israel, known in Hebrew as Tel Batash (תל בטש) or Teluliot Batashi (plural), and in Arabic as Tell Butashi or Teleilat Batashi (plural). The site is not to be confused with either the as yet unidentified Timna from the hill country of Judah (Josh 15:57), nor with the southern copper-smelting site of Timna in the Arabah near Eilat.

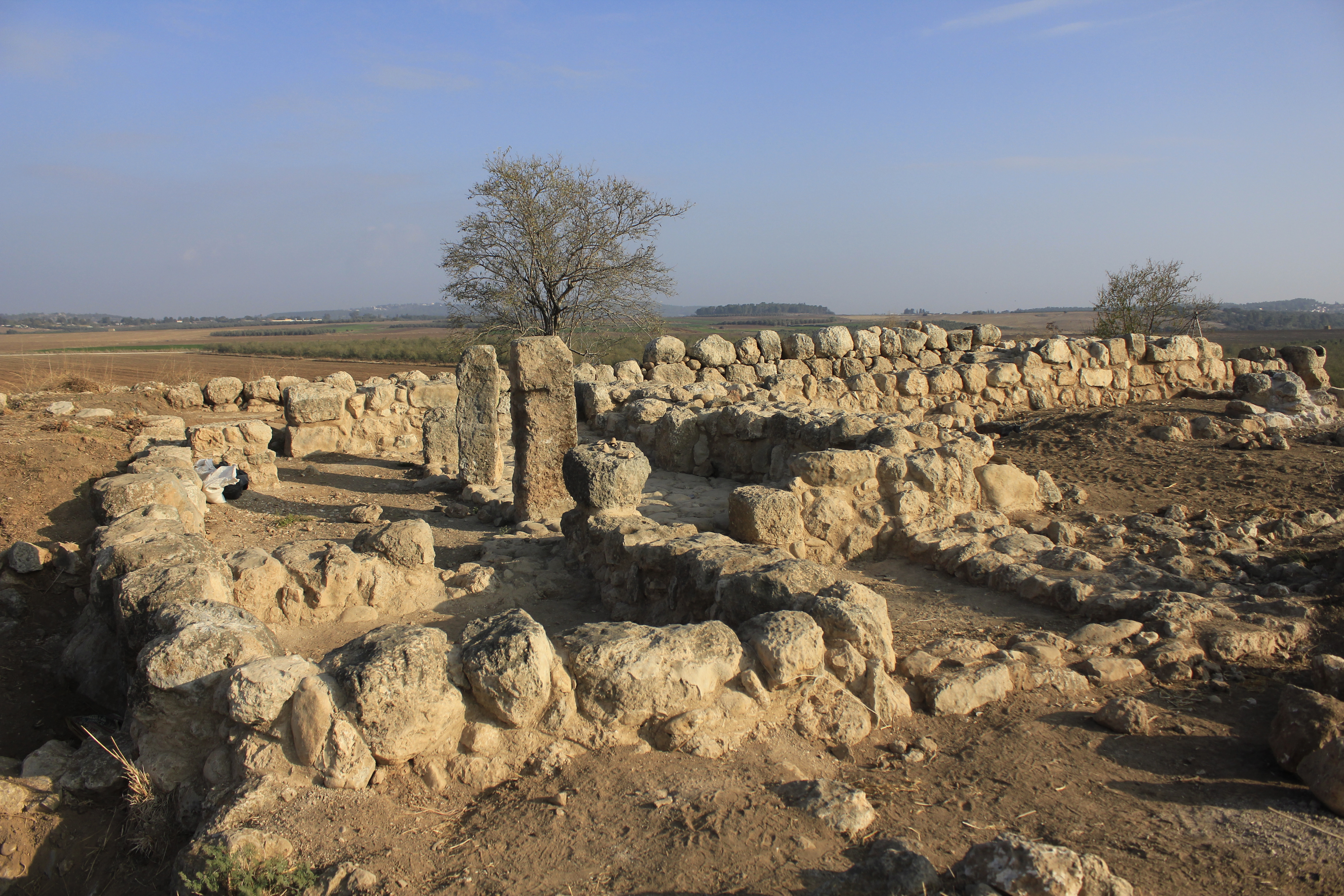
Timnath in the Soreq Valley

The Tel Batash mound was discovered in the 19th century by C. Clermont-Ganneau, who identified it as a Roman military camp. In subsequent years, the site was uncovered through 1977–1989, in 12 seasons of excavations, by Amihai Mazar and George L. Kelm while Kelm was serving as professor of Biblical backgrounds and archaeology at Southwestern Baptist Theological Seminary, on a dig sponsored by the Seminary.

== Geography ==
Tel Batash is strategically located in the Sorek Valley, an access point from the Coastal Plain through the Shephelah and into the Central Judean Mountains.

== Hebrew Bible references ==
In Genesis 38:13, a place called Timnah (Timnath) is mentioned in the context of the story of the Hebrew patriarch Judah and Tamar. Some think that Judah may have gone to this Timnah (Tibna) to shear his sheep, when he met his daughter-in-law in passing, while others suggest that this would have happened in the Timnath now known in Arabic as Khirbet et-Tibbaneh.

In Joshua 15:10, a place with this name is mentioned as a point on the border of the Tribe of Judah, and Judges 14:5 refers to Timnah's vineyards.

In Judges 14:1–20, Samson went down to Timnah in order to find a wife. On his way there, he tore apart a lion. Samson married a "girl of the Philistines" from Timnah and posed a riddle for the men of Timnah, which they were only able to resolve following the intervention of his wife.

== History ==
Excavations under the leadership of Mazar and Kelm during the 1970s–1980s uncovered twelve strata of continuous settlement at the site through the Hellenistic period, with sparse settlement nearby during the Byzantine period.

Not far from the tell, on the edge of Nahal Sorek (Sorek Valley), are the remains of a Roman road as well as settlement dating to the Chalcolithic and Canaanite periods.

=== Middle Bronze Age ===
==== Middle Bronze II ====
Tel Batash (4 ha/10 acre) was first settled in the Middle Bronze Age in the Sorek Valley over flat land, with a retangular complex without large stone foundations surrounded by earthen ramparts against a brick wall. Compare Tell Beit-Shemesh (7 km) without glacis but large stone foundation.

- Middle Bronze IIB
- Middle Bronze IIC

=== Iron Age ===
==== Iron I ====
Tel Batash during the Philistine era (Late Bronze Age to Iron Age) was a fortified city with dense mud-brick construction.

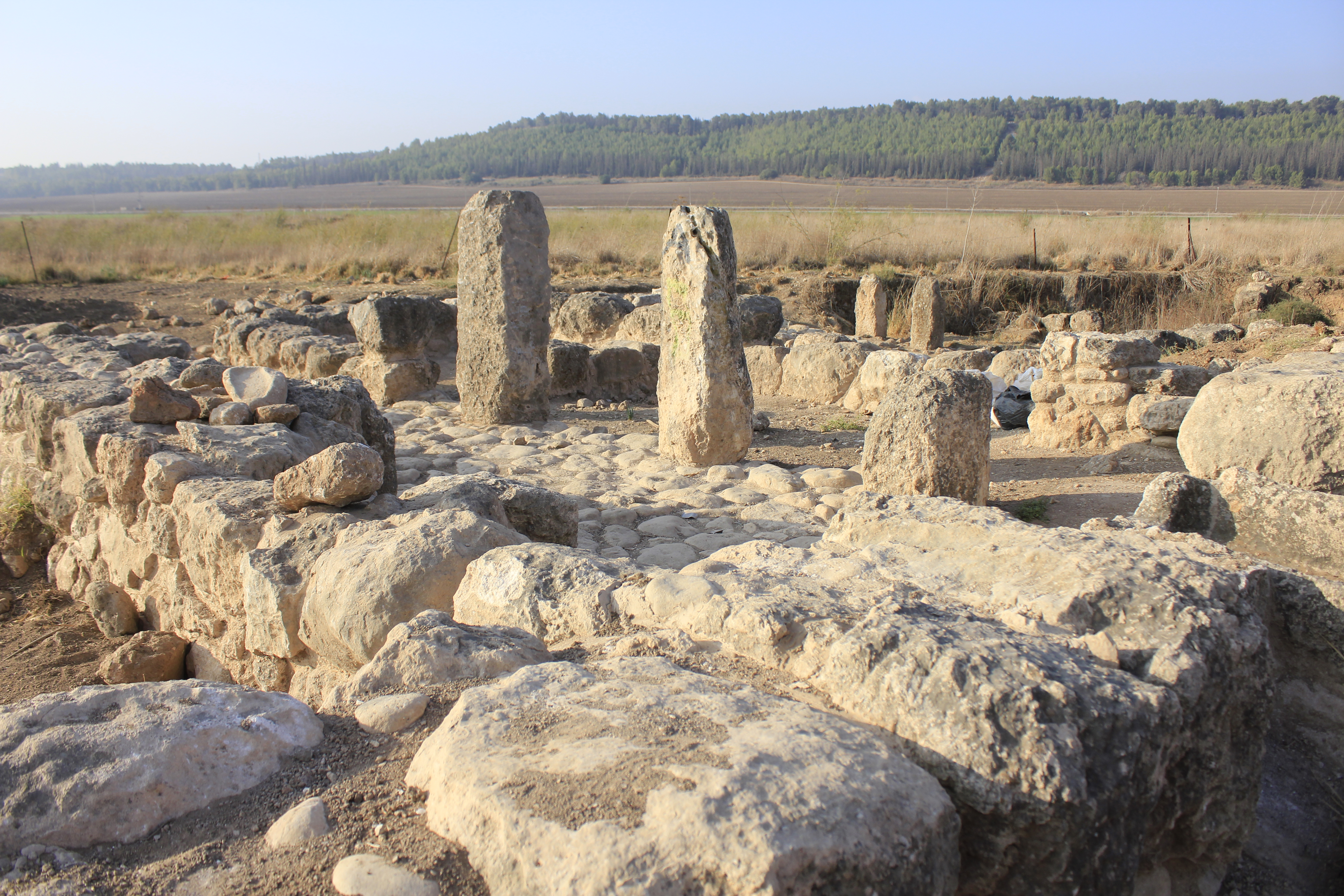
Timnath in the Soreq Valley

==== Iron II ====
In the 9th and 8th centuries BCE, it was a town of c. 500 people, according to archaeologist William G. Dever. The archaeologists discovered fortifications and buildings from the Kingdom of Judah period, dating to the 7th and 8th centuries BCE. In one of the buildings, a ceramic potsherd bearing a written LMLK seal was found.

== Old identification (Khirbet Tibneh) ==
Khirbet Tibna, also spelled Kh. Tibneh, is a ruin situated ca. 3.2 kilometres (2 mi) south-west of Bet Shemesh, Israel, and lying at an elevation of 740 feet (230 m) above sea-level. In the Survey of Palestine Map of 1928–1947 (Pal 1157), preserved at the National Library of Israel, it is listed in map section 14-12, at Grid reference 144.1 / 127.9 [144/127 PAL], under coordinates 31^{o}44'36.587" N / 34^{o}56'12.72"E. The ruin lies ca. 2 kilometers north-east of Moshav Sdot Micha and about 1,400 metres (4,600 ft) south-west of Bîr el-Leimûn. Access to the site is now restricted, as it sits in a military area. Early explorers and historical geographers identified the ruin Kh. Tibna with the biblical town of Timnah, thought to be associated with stories of the biblical Samson (Judges 14:1–5). French orientalist Clermont-Ganneau also thought Tibna to be a corruption of the Hebrew word Timnah.

Edward Robinson visited the immediate area in 1838, and Tibna was already a deserted village. Archaeologist W.F. Albright visited the site in the winter of 1924–25, which he described as "Khirbet Tibneh, the Timnath of the Samson story." He wrote that the site was covered with "masses of Græco-Roman and Byzantine débris," although he was unable to come-up with Jewish potsherds. In the 1940s, archaeologist Benjamin Mazar conducted a surface survey in the region, including Tell Butashi, without digging.

== Modern identification (Tell Butashi) ==
Today, modern archaeologists think the biblical Timnath (Timnah) associated with the saga of Samson to have been situated where Tell Butashi is now located and where extensive archaeological excavations had been conducted during the 1970s–1980s. With the town's demise, the name "Timnah" is thought to have migrated to the site now known as Khirbet Tibna, a few kilometers away from Tell Butashi.

== Other References ==
- George L. Kelm; Amihay Mazar (December 1995). Timnah: a biblical city in the Sorek Valley. Eisenbrauns. ISBN 978-0-931464-97-3.
- Eerdmans Dictionary of the Bible. Amsterdam University Press. 31 December 2000. p. 1312. ISBN 978-90-5356-503-2.
- John Charles Hugh Laughlin (2006). Fifty major cities of the Bible: from Dan to Beersheba. Routledge. pp. 226–. ISBN 978-0-415-22315-7.
- Lester L. Grabbe (2003). "Like a bird in a cage": the invasion of Sennacherib in 701 BCE. Continuum International Publishing Group. p. 12. ISBN 978-0-8264-6215-2.
- Jonathan Michael Golden (November 2004). Ancient Canaan and Israel: new perspectives. ABC-CLIO. pp. 70–71. ISBN 978-1-57607-897-6.
