= Gazara =

Gazara was, according to the Bible, a fortress of great strength in Judea that figures often in the Maccabean wars.

In Judean history, Gazara is recalled as the ancient Gezer, the fortress captured by a pharaoh, who gave it to his daughter when she married Solomon. In the Maccabean chronicles, this place was the location where Judas pursued Gorgias (1 Maccabees 4:15). It was fortified by the Greek general Bacchides (1 Maccabees 9:52; Ant, XIII, i, 3). It was captured by Simon Maccabeus along with the city of Joppa and the Jerusalem citadel, which all belonged to the Seleucid empire. Simon built a palace at Gazara, and appointed his son, John, commander of his army (1 Maccabees 13:43). Recent excavations have uncovered the ruins of Simon's palace. Maccabean account also cited that Judeans started settling in Gazara, which has also been confirmed by archaeological evidence. A different account of Gazara's occupation is given in 2 Maccabees 10:32, where the capture is attributed to Judas. This event, however, caused the war with the Seleucid king Antiochus VII.

The fortress is identical with Tel Jezer, the ancient Gezer.

Emil Schürer, a professor of theology at the University of Giessen, wrote:

Gazara, the old Geshur, not far from Emmaus Nicopolis in a westerly direction, at the base of the mountains, had been up to that time a Gentile city. Possession of it was of importance to the Jews, because it was one of the places which commanded the passes of the mountains, and the holding of it was thus absolutely necessary in order to maintain connection between Jerusalem and the port of Joppa, which had been already annexed by the Jews.
