= Amihai Mazar =

Israeli archaeologist

Ami Mazar
- עמי מזר
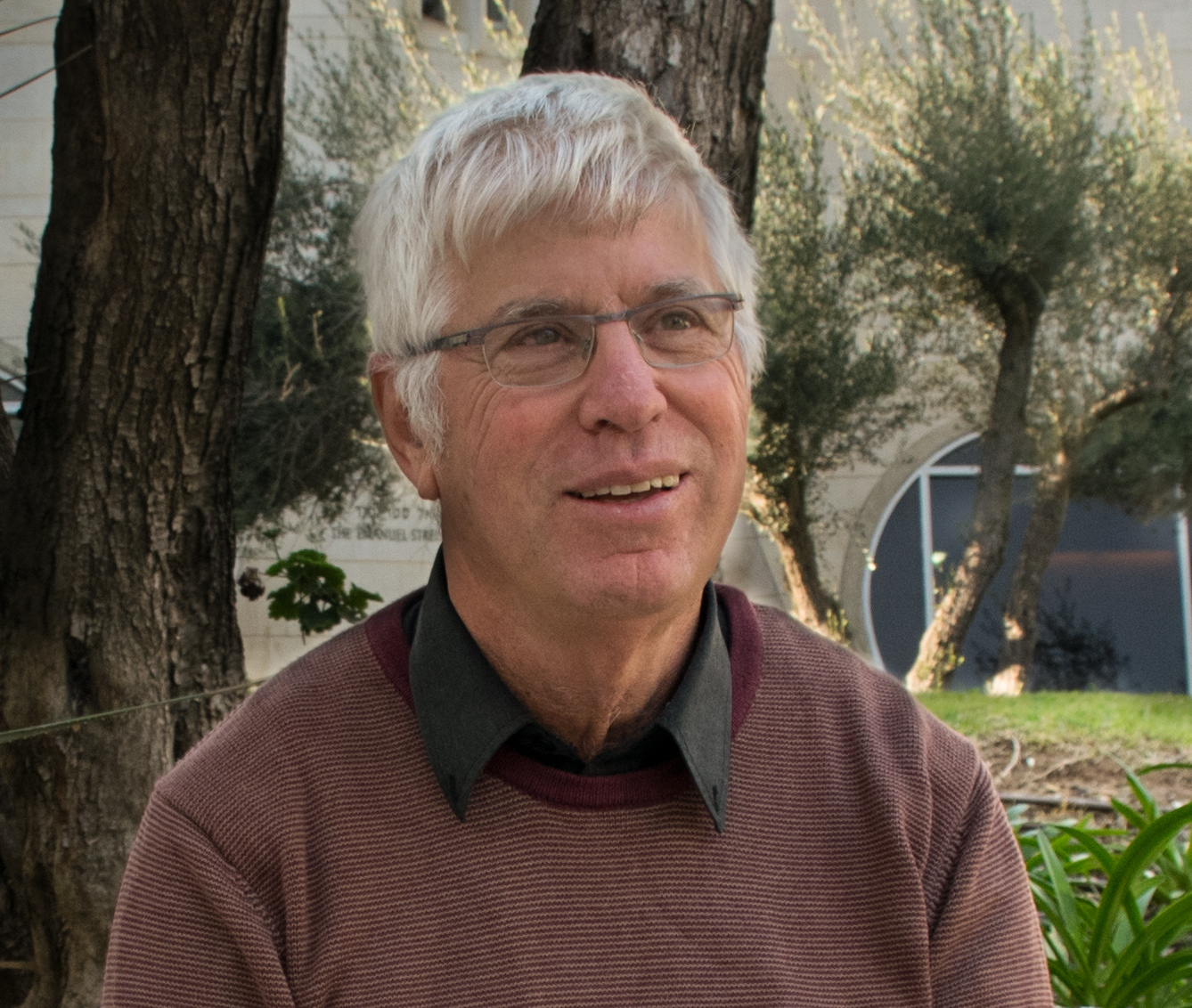
- Mazar in 2014
- Born: Amihai Mazar; 19 November 1942 (age 83); Haifa, Mandatory Palestine
- Relatives: Benjamin Mazar (uncle)

Academic work
- Discipline: Archaeology
- Sub-discipline: Levantine archaeology; Archaeology of Israel; Biblical archaeology; Iron Age
- Institutions: Hebrew University of Jerusalem

Amihai "Ami" Mazar (Hebrew: עמיחי מזר; born November 19, 1942) is an Israeli archaeologist. Born in Haifa, Israel (then the British Mandate of Palestine), he has been since 1994 a professor at the Institute of Archaeology of the Hebrew University of Jerusalem, holding the Eleazer Sukenik Chair in the Archaeology of Israel.

His Archaeology of the Land of the Bible is a widely used textbook for Israelite archaeology in universities.

Mazar's work has resulted in the Modified Conventional Chronology being the most widely accepted framework for the Israelite chronology during the Iron Age period. The problem is that MCC is silent upon many key events.

Mazar is married with three children and resides in Jerusalem. He is the nephew of Benjamin Mazar, one of the first generation of pioneering Israeli archaeologists after Independence, and cousin to the late archaeologist Eilat Mazar.

== Archaeological excavations ==
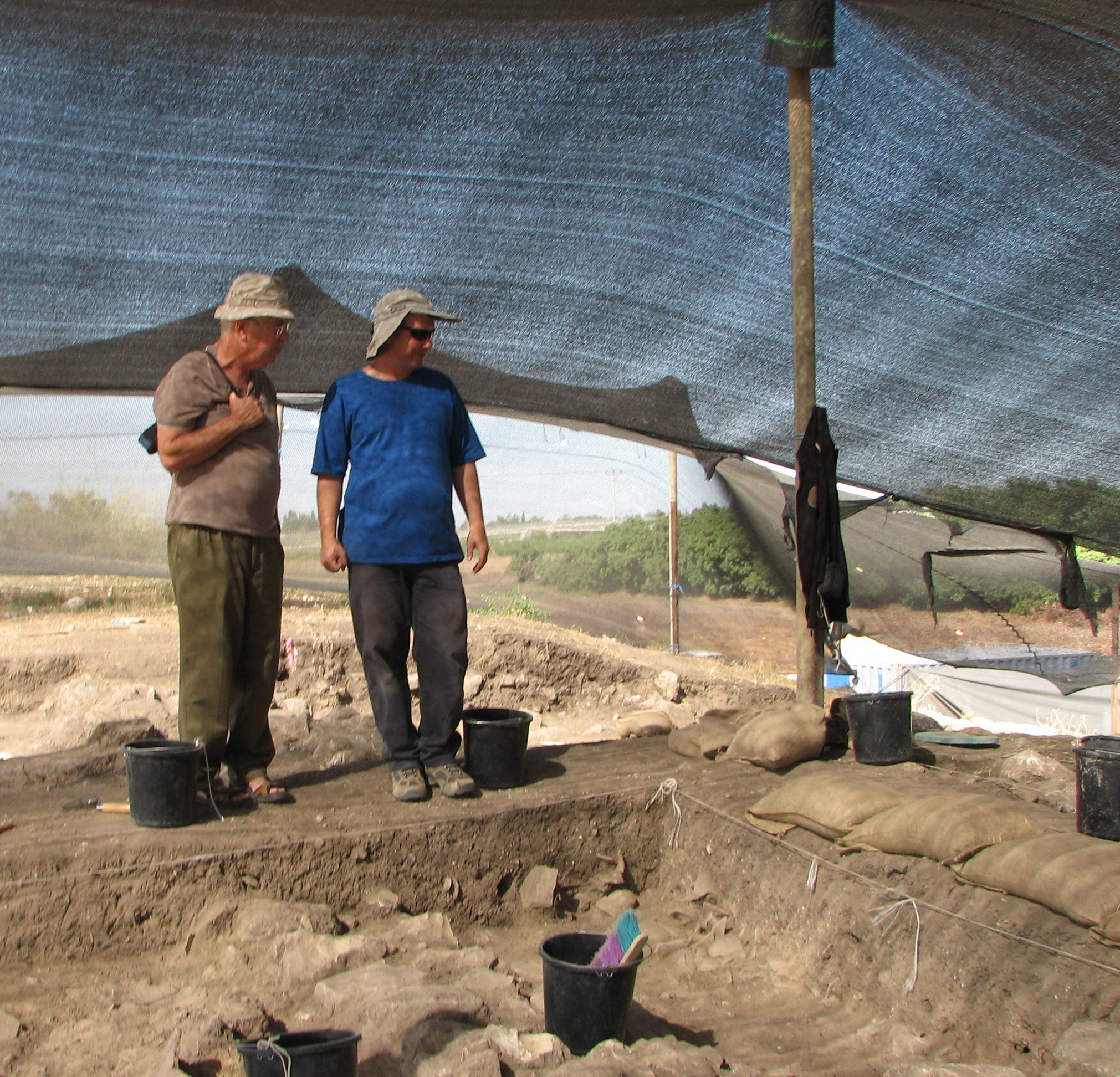
Mazar (left) in 2010

Amihai Mazar has directed archaeological excavations at a number of sites in Israel and the Palestinian territories that include:

- Tell Qasile
- Timnah (Tel Batash) – from 1977–1989
- Bull Site – from 1978-1981
- Bet She'an – from 1989–1996
- Rehov (Tel Rehov) – from 1997-2012

Amihai Mazar was one of the first archaeologists to normalize the use of radiocarbon dating in Levantine and Mediterranean sites more broadly, starting with his work at Tel Rehov.

=== Ancient beehives ===
While excavating the ancient city of Rehov Mazar discovered 30 intact hives, dating from c. 900 BCE, a time when the city had about 2,000 residents. The beehives, made of straw and unbaked clay, were found in orderly rows and may be the oldest complete beehives ever discovered.

== Awards ==
In 2009, Prof. Mazar was awarded the Israel Prize in archaeology.

== Publications ==
=== Books ===
- Excavations at Tell Qasile, Part One. The Philistine Sanctuary: Architecture and Cult Objects (Qedem 12). Jerusalem: The Hebrew University of Jerusalem 1981.
- Excavations at Tell Qasile, Part Two. Various Finds, The Pottery, Conclusions, Appendices (Qedem 20). Jerusalem: The Hebrew University of Jerusalem 1985.
- Archaeology of the Land of the Bible, 10,000–586 B.C.E., Anchor Bible Reference Library, Doubleday, 1990. ISBN 0-385-23970-X (Hbk) ISBN 0-385-42590-2 (Pbk)
- Timnah – A Biblical Town in the Sorek Valley. Winona Lake 1995 (with G. L. Kelm).
- Timnah (Tel Batash) I: Stratigraphy and Architecture (Qedem 37). Jerusalem 1997.
- Timnah (Tel Batash) II: The Finds from the First Millennium BCE (Qedem 42). Jerusalem 2001 (with N. Panitz-Cohen).
- Excavations at Tel Beth-Shean 1989–1996, Volume I. From the Late Bronze Age IIB to the Medieval Period. Jerusalem 2006.
- Excavations at Tel Beth-Shean 1989–1996, Volume II: The Middle and Late Bronze Age Strata in Area R, (editor with Robert Mullins). Jerusalem 2007.
- The Quest for the Historical Israel, (Archaeological and Biblical Studies 17) (with Israel Finkelstein, editor Brian B. Schmidt), Atlanta 2007.

=== Articles ===
- "The Excavations at Tel Beth-Shean", Eretz-Israel 21 (1990), pp. 197–211 (in Hebrew).
- "Temples of the Middle and Late Bronze Ages and the Iron Age", in Kempinski, A. & Reich, R. (eds), The Architecture of Ancient Israel from the Prehistoric to the Persian Periods – in Memory of Immanual (Munya) Dunayevsky, Jerusalem: IES, (1992), pp. 161–187.
- "The Excavations at Tel Beth-Shean in 1989–1990", in Biran, A. & Aviram, J. (eds), Biblical Archaeology Today, 1990 – Proceedings of the Second International Congress on Biblical Archaeology, Jerusalem, 1990, Jerusalem: IES, (1993), pp. 606–619.
- "Beth Shean in the Iron Age: Preliminary Report and Conclusions of the 1990–1991 Excavations", IEJ 43.4 (1993), pp. 201–229.
- "Four Thousand Years of History at Tel Beth-Shean", Qadmoniot 27.3-4 (1994), pp. 66–83 (in Hebrew).
- "Four Thousand Years of History at Tel Beth-Shean – An Account of the Renewed Excavations", BA 60.2 (1997), pp. 62–76.
- "The Excavations at Tel Beth Shean during the Years 1989-94", in Silberman, N.A. & Small, D. (eds), The Archaeology of Israel – Constructing the Past, Interpreting the Present, [JSOT Supplement Series 237], Sheffield: Sheffield Academic Press, (1997), pp. 144–164.
- “Iron Age Chronology: A Reply to I. Finkelstein” Levant (1997), pp. 157-167
- "The 1997-1998 Excavations at Tel Rehov: Preliminary Report" Israel Exploration Journal (1999), pp. 1-42
- “The Debate over the Chronology of the Iron Age in the Southern Levant” in (eds. Levy & Higman) The Bible and Radiocarbon Dating: Archaeology, Text, and Science (2005), pp. 15-30.
- (with Christopher Bronk Ramsay) "14C Dates and the Iron Age Chronology of Israel: A Response", Radiocarbon (2008), pp. 159-180
- (with Christopher Bronk Ramsay) "A Response to Finkelstein and Piasetzky's Criticism and 'New Perspective'", Radiocarbon (2010), pp. 1681-1688
- “Archaeology and the Biblical Narrative: The Case of the United Monarchy” in (eds. Kratz & Spieckermann) One God - One Cult - One Nation: Archaeological and Biblical Perspectives (2010), pp. 29-58
- “The Iron Age Chronology Debate: Is the Gap Narrowing? Another Viewpoint” Near Eastern Archaeology (2011), pp. 105-111
- (with Sharen Lee & Christopher Bronk Ramsay) "Iron Age Chronology in Israel: Results from Modelling with a Trapezoidal Bayesian Framework", Radiocarbon (2013), pp. 731-740
- “Archaeology and the Bible: Reflections on Historical Memory in the Deuteronomistic History” in (ed. Maier) Congress Volume Munich 2013 (2014), pp. 347-369.

== See also ==
- List of Israel Prize recipients
