= Philoi =

Ancient Greek social role

Philoi (Ancient Greek: φίλοι; sg. φίλος philos) is a word that roughly translates to 'friends'. This type of friendship is based on the characteristically Greek value for reciprocity as opposed to a friendship that exists as an end to itself.

== Characteristics ==
=== Reciprocity ===
There is no exact translation for philoi other than the word 'friend' (separate from xenoi, or 'guest-friends', often used to describe a stranger one is kind or respectful to). The meaning of the word philoi is deeply rooted in the concept of reciprocity; encompassing the exchange of favors and support, in addition to a profound sense of duty to each other. Philoi typically encompassed family members foremost, with the addition of friends or members of society with whom obligations, loyalty or other established ties existed.

== Greek value-system ==
Within the Greek value-system there was an explicit distinction between friends (philoi) and enemies (echthroi), and further, a prevalent and constant awareness of both how to treat and one can expect to be treated by each. In fact, every member of society could be classified into three distinct groups: philoi, people one owed obligations to and from whom favors were returned, echthroi, those to whom one was hostile and from whom they expected hostility, and medeteroi, outsiders who fall under neither category and to whom no one owed anything. Such classifications are rooted in a fundamental belief in the principle of reciprocity, which continually reinforced that the man's duty was to aid his friends and to inflict damage onto his enemies. Further, there was great pride associated with not only helping philoi but also in harming one's echthroi, and the importance of fulfilling these two duties to upload an overarching, strict friend-enemy dichotomy is manifested in a variety of other aspects in Greek life, including literature, theatre and in court.

== Philoi in court ==
The importance of the philoi's role, in particular within a larger cultural system that polarizes the philoi and echthroi, is evident in trial processes in Ancient Greek courts. Trials sought to establish a winning and losing party instead of necessarily achieving a balanced, even-handed verdict. Contributing to this was the importance of witnesses in the Athenian courts despite never being cross-examined. Witnesses were oftentimes chosen not by who would be the most impartial, but instead close philoi of those involved. Thus, the average Athenian man's dependence on his philoi permeated even trial proceedings and outcomes, and as described by Isaeus in On the Estate of Pyrrhos: "You all know that when we are acting without concealment and need witnesses, we normally make use of our close relatives and intimate friends as witnesses of such actions."

== Women ==
With the exception of festivals, women had limited roles outside of the home and therefore had finite opportunities to cultivate reciprocal relationships with their philoi and echthroi in the same way men in Greece did. As a result, the woman's philoi consisted solely of those in her own home.

== In literature ==
The practice of reciprocal obligation amongst philoi and overarching strict friend-enemy dichotomy characteristic of Greek value-systems manifest themselves in Homeric heroes such as Agamemnon and Achilles in Homer's Iliad. The prevalence of warfare in which heroes compete against each other to prove their superiority evidences this dichotomy; that there must be two explicit opposing sides, and both parties must act in accordance to their duty to harm one another, typically in a public display.

== In philosophy ==
This definition of philoi is cemented in and often discussed in various philosophical works from this time too, and in particular those of Aristotle. In Nicomachean Ethics, Aristotle writes that "to be friends, then, they must be mutually recognized as bearing goodwill and wishing well to each other," indicating that a philoi is characterized by not necessarily fondness for someone, but a concern for one another that is assuredly reciprocated. He explains that people inherently are fond of those who treat them well or who they believe have the intention, and further, that people usually love those who hate the same people they do, hence the need for philoi on your side, as opposed to the echthroi's side, who will defend you. Aristotle writes that "friendship is likened to one's love for oneself" but that philoi nonetheless exist "for the sake of some use to be made of him," so they appear to serve both self-serving and altruistic intentions.

== Macedonia ==
In ancient Macedonia, philoi was a title to the royal friends, advisors of the king (basileus). They were the personal choice of the king and they might have come from anywhere in the Greek world. The title became common among the Hellenistic kingdoms after Alexander the Great's empire was partitioned to be ruled by the diadochi. In the Seleucid Empire a number of ranks can be traced; Protoi Philoi, First Friends and Timomenoi Philoi, Honoured Friends organized in various orders. In inscriptions the phrase the King, his Friends and the army signifies their important role. Still, "friend" appeared to be the lowest rank of nobility in the Seleucid and Ptolemaic aristocracies; while an important honor, it could be handed out more freely to the king's supporters, including non-Greeks unlikely to be given a higher rank.
