= Merkaz Shapira =

Village in southern Israel

Merkaz Shapira: מֶרְכַּז שַׁפִּירָא (Hebrew); مركز شفيرا (Arabic)
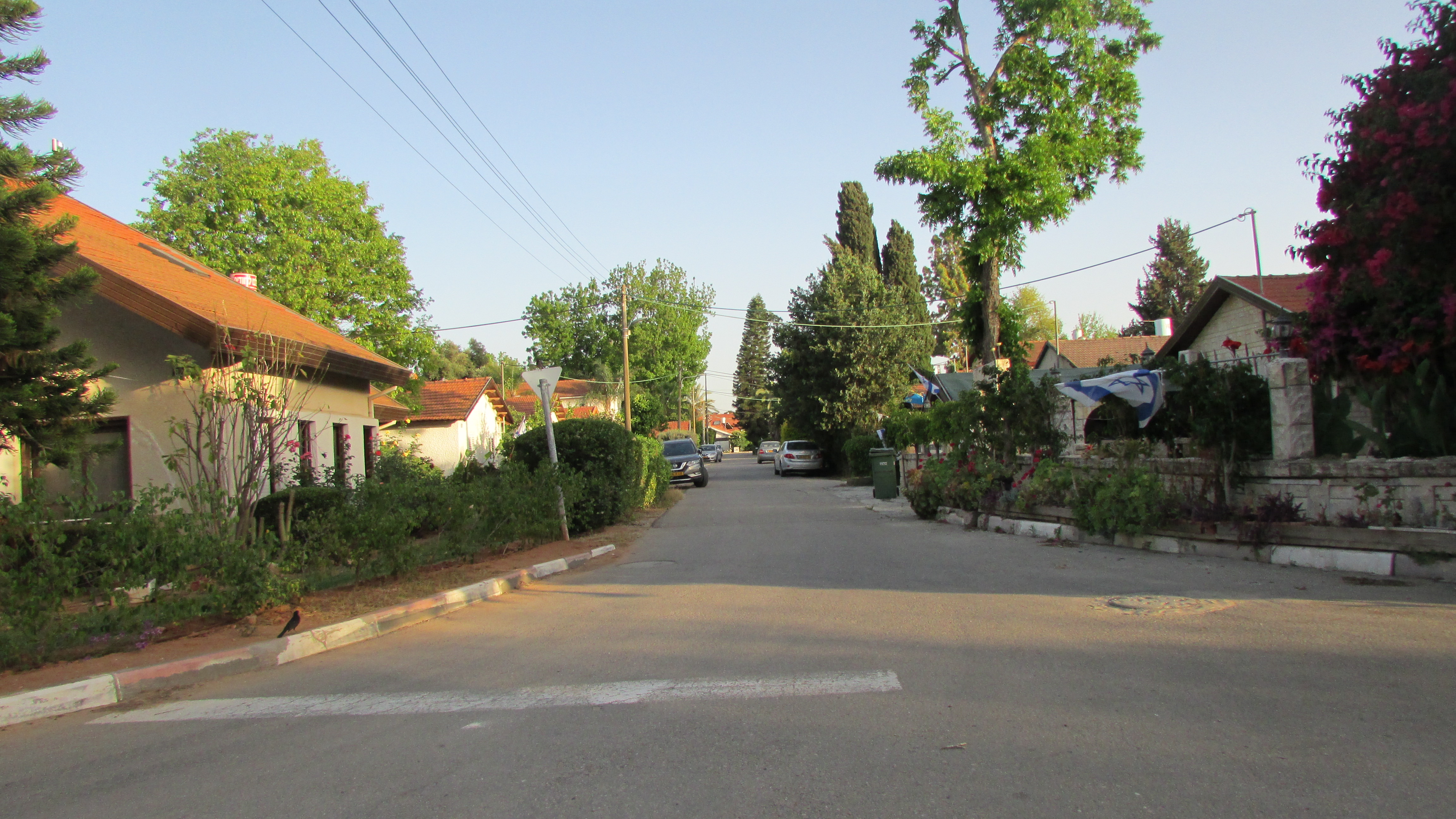
- Etymology: Shapira Center
- Location within Ashkelon region of Israel
- Coordinates: 31°41′48″N 34°42′24″E
- Country: Israel
- District: Southern
- Subdistrict: Ashkelon
- Council: Shafir
- Founded: 1948
- Population (2024): 2,962

Merkaz Shapira (Hebrew: מֶרְכַּז שַׁפִּירָא) (lit: Shapira Center) is a religious village in the Southern District of Israel. Located in the southern Shephelah between Kiryat Malakhi and Ashkelon, it falls under the jurisdiction of Shafir Regional Council. In 2024 it had a population of 2,962.

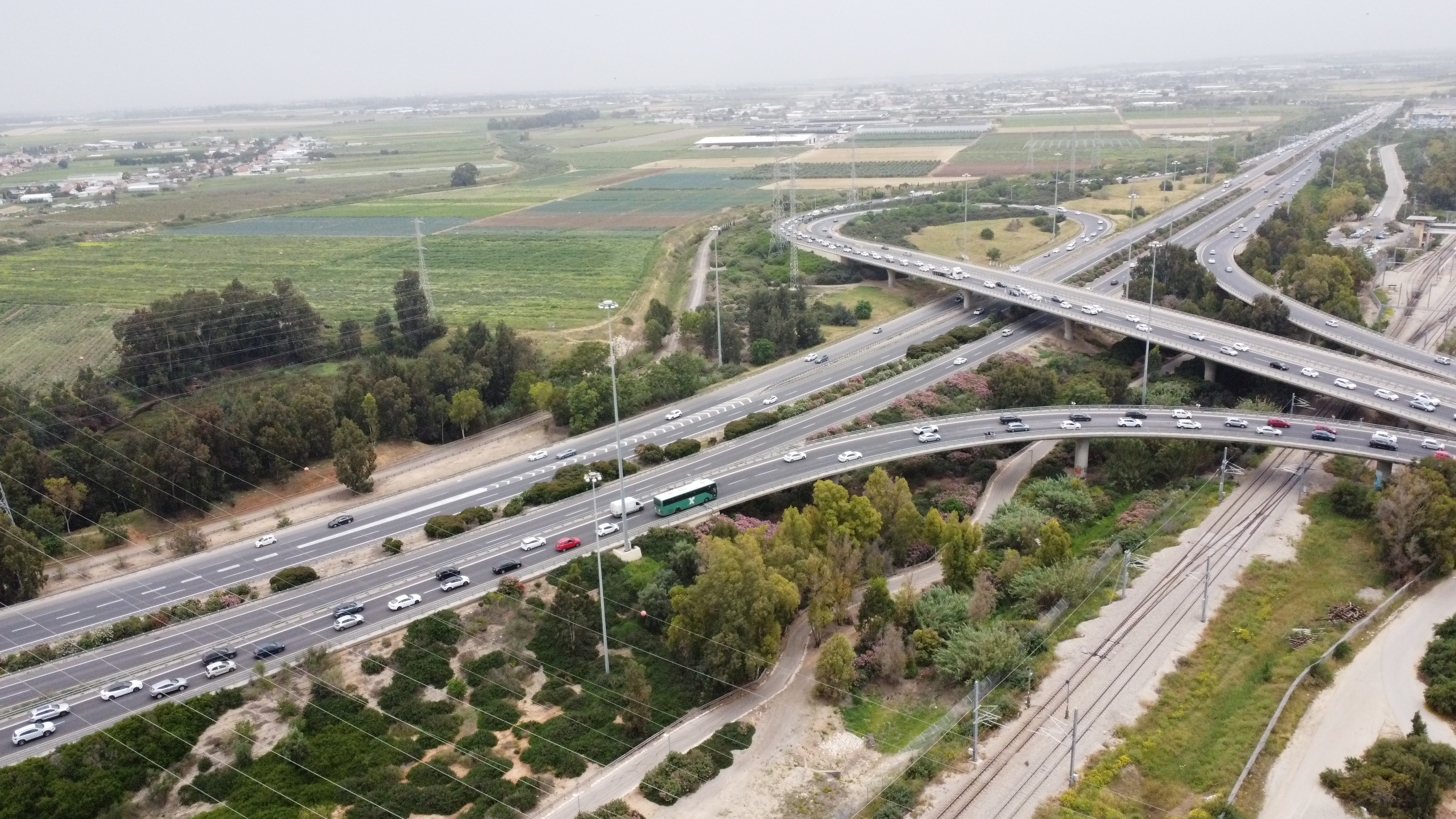
An interchange just outside Merkaz Shapira, Israel

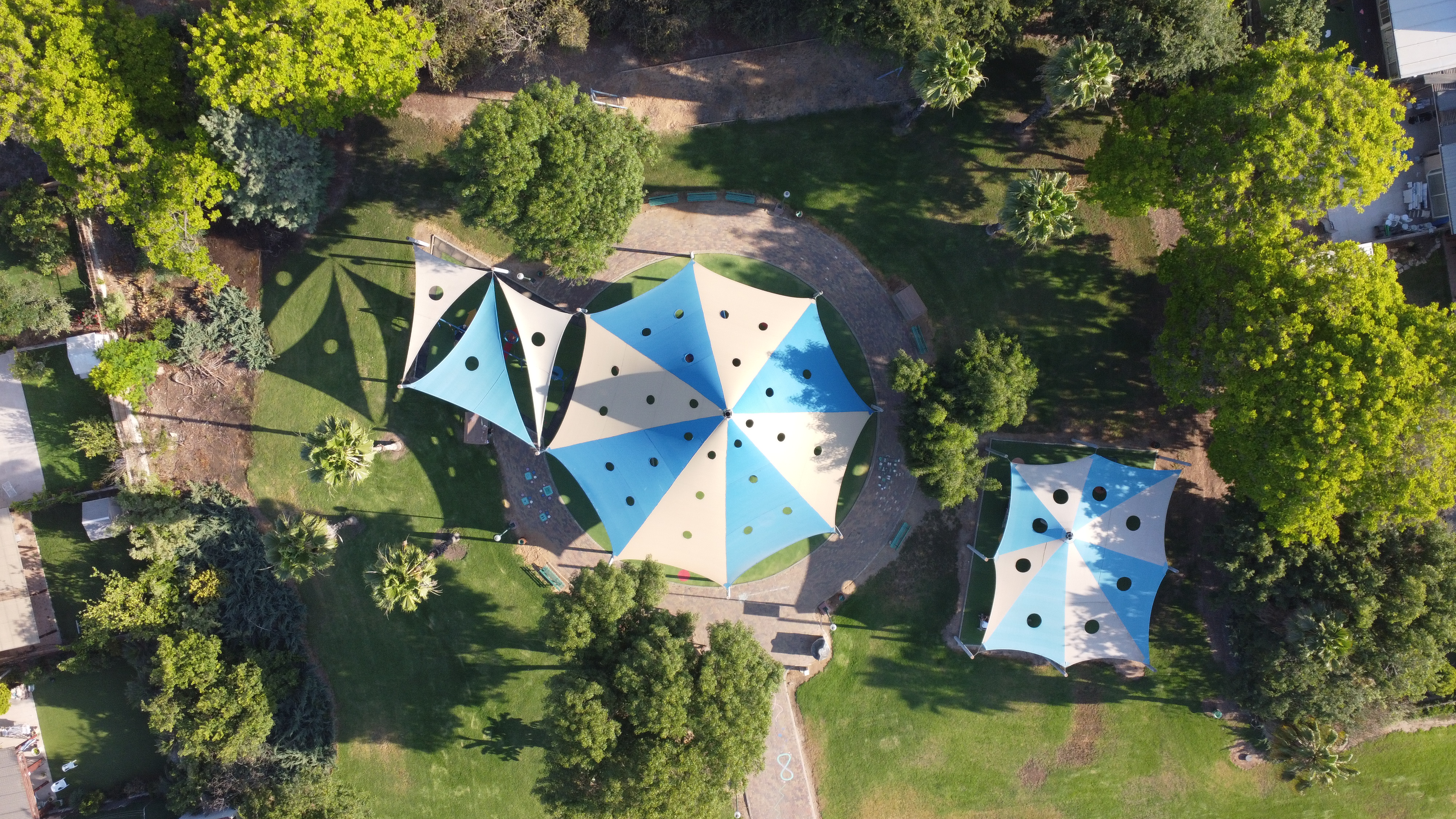
A park in Merkaz Shapira from above

== History ==
The village was founded in the beginning of the 1950s as the Shafir Regional Center, a group of regional educational facilities, at a site adjacent to the ruins of the depopulated Palestinian village of Al-Sawafir al-Gharbiyya. In 1958, it was merged with the farm Dganim, which was abandoned due to failure. In October 1957, The name was changed to Merkaz Shapira in honor of Knesset member Haim-Moshe Shapira, who was wounded in a grenade attack, but due to legal problems, it was only changed officially in 1970.

Merkaz Shapira contains the Or Etzion yeshiva which consists of both a high school and post-high school religious learning institutions (on its eastern end) and an elementary and middle school for itself and nearby villages (Azrikam, Ein Tzurim, Masu'ot Yitzhak, Shafir, Shtulim and Zerahia). The offices of the Shafir Regional Council are also located within the village. Merkaz Shapira has five synagogues - Ohel Yitzhak, The Jerusalemite Synagogue, The Moroccan Synagogue, the Ashkenazi Ashmoret Avraham and the Yemenite Ahuzat Shalom.

== Notable residents ==
- Haim Drukman
