= Ein Tzurim =

Kibbutz in southern Israel

Ein Tzurim: עֵין צוּרִים (Hebrew); عين تسوريم (Arabic)
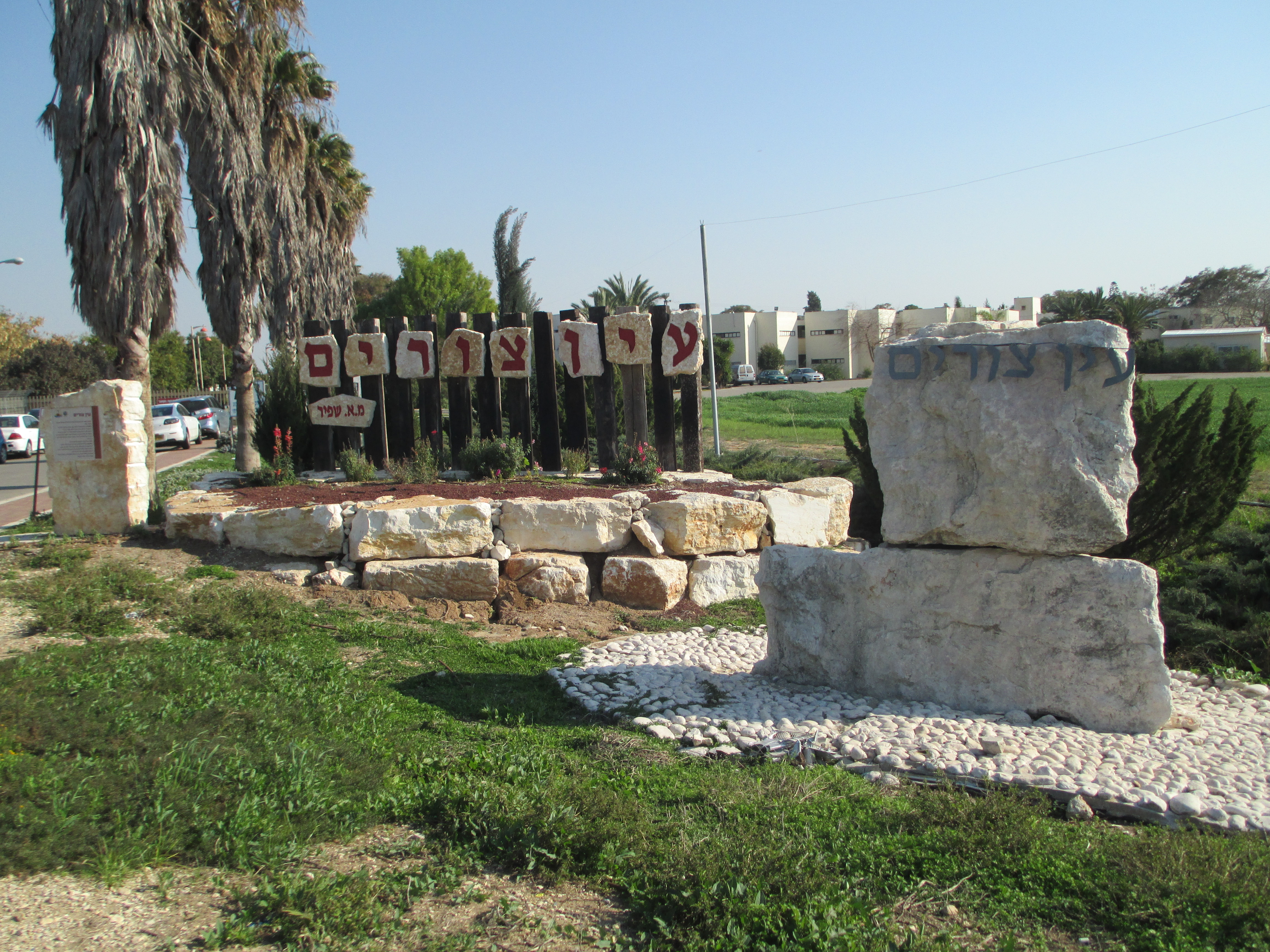
- Ein Tzurim

- Location within Ashkelon region of Israel Location within Israel
- Coordinates: 31°41′41″N 34°43′7″E
- Country: Israel
- District: Southern
- Subdistrict: Ashkelon
- Council: Shafir
- Affiliation: Religious Kibbutz Movement
- Founded: 23 October 1946 (in Gush Etzion); 1949 (current location)
- Founder: Bnei Akiva members
- Population (2024): 881

Ein Tzurim (Hebrew: עֵין צוּרִים, lit. Rock Spring) is a religious kibbutz in southern Israel. Located south of Kiryat Malakhi, it falls under the jurisdiction of Shafir Regional Council and is a member of the Religious Kibbutz Movement. In 2024 it had a population of 881.

== History ==
=== Original kibbutz ===
The kibbutz was founded on 23 October 1946 as a new settlement in Gush Etzion (east of the present-day location). Its founders were Palestine-born members of the fifth gar'in of Bnei Akiva that had formed in Tirat Zvi.

By 1947 the kibbutz had a population of 80. However, during the 1948 Arab–Israeli war, it was destroyed by the Jordanian army along with all the other settlements in Gush Etzion. The men who stayed to fight were captured as prisoners of war and taken to the Mafrak Prisoner of War camp.

With the renewal of Jewish settlement in Gush Etzion after the Six-Day War, a new kibbutz called Rosh Tzurim was founded on the original location of Ein Tzurim.

=== Relocation ===
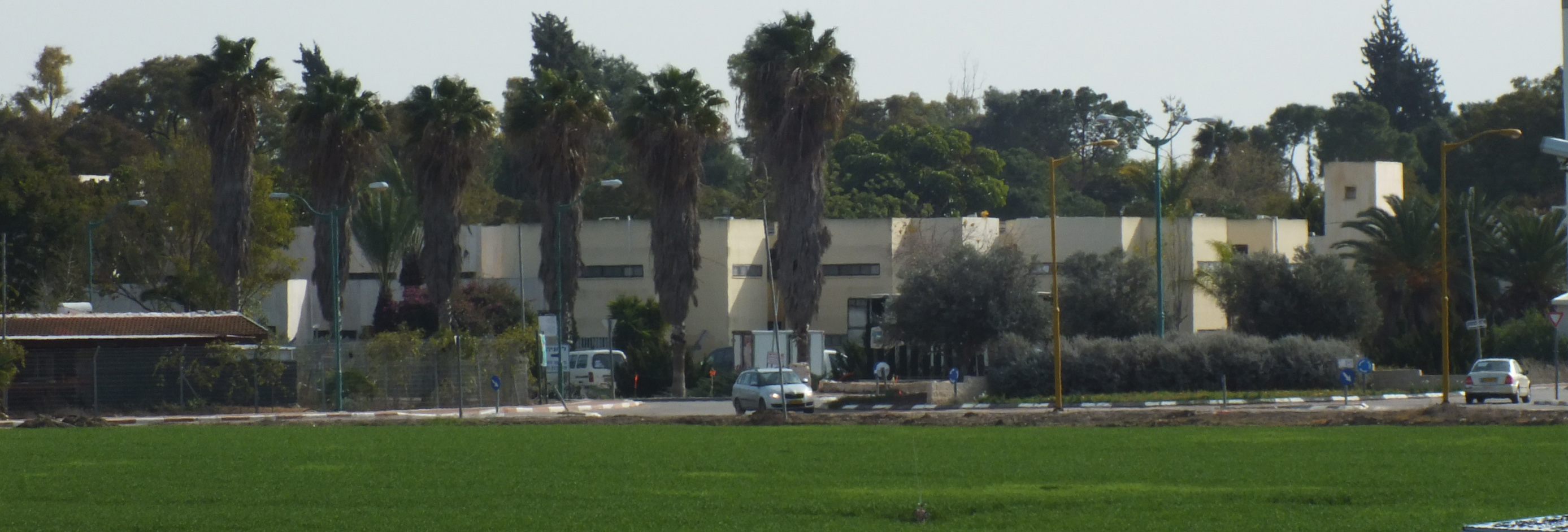
Ein Tzurim

In 1949 the people who left Ein Tzurim founded a new kibbutz in south-central Israel near the existing villages of Zerahia, Shafir and Merkaz Shapira, and they named it "Ein Tzurim" as a symbol of continuity. It was founded on the lands of the depopulated Palestinian village of al-Sawafir al-Sharqiyya.

In the 1980s two major educational centers were built in the area of the kibbutz; Yeshivat HaKibbutz HaDati and the Yaakov Herzog Center for the Study of Judaism. However, in 2008 the yeshiva closed due to insufficient enrollment. Every Yom Kippur former students return to pray together.

After the Gaza disengagement in 2005, some evacuees from Gush Katif moved into a trailer park near the kibbutz and plans were drawn up for permanent housing.

== Economy ==
The economy is based on fruit orchards (lemon and persimmon), vegetable crops (artichokes), dairy farming and turkey-breeding. The kibbutz also has an air-conditioner factory and runs a guesthouse.

== Historic images ==
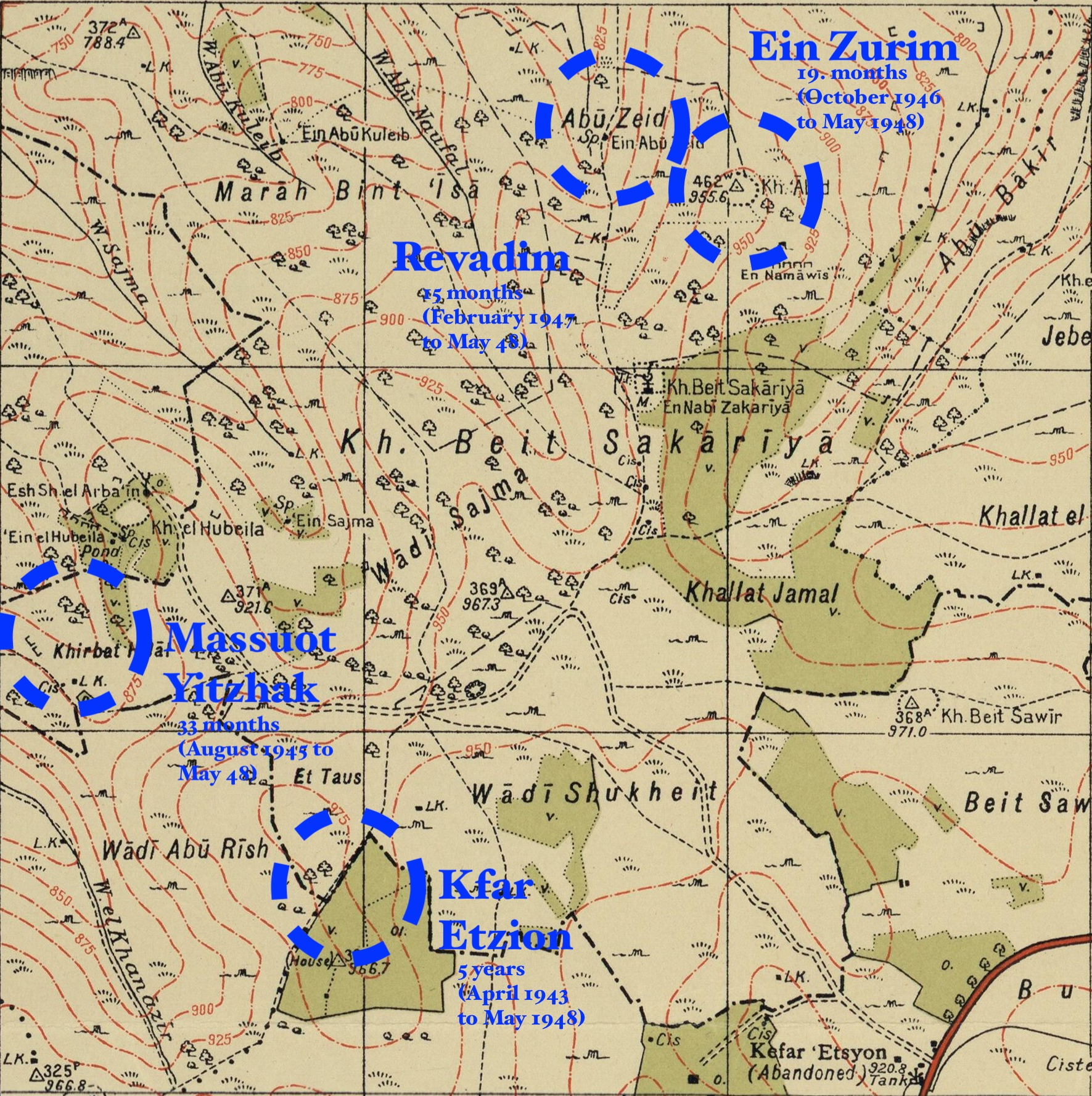
The four kibbutzes of the Gush Etzion at the time of the 1948 war (Kfar Etzion, Ein Zurim, Massuot Yitzhak, Revadim) overlaid on a 1943 Survey of Palestine map

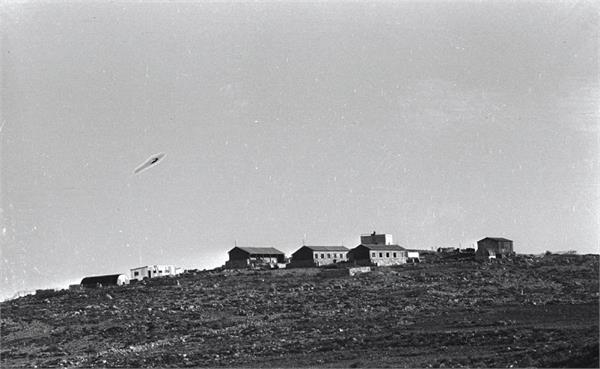
Ein Tzurim 1947

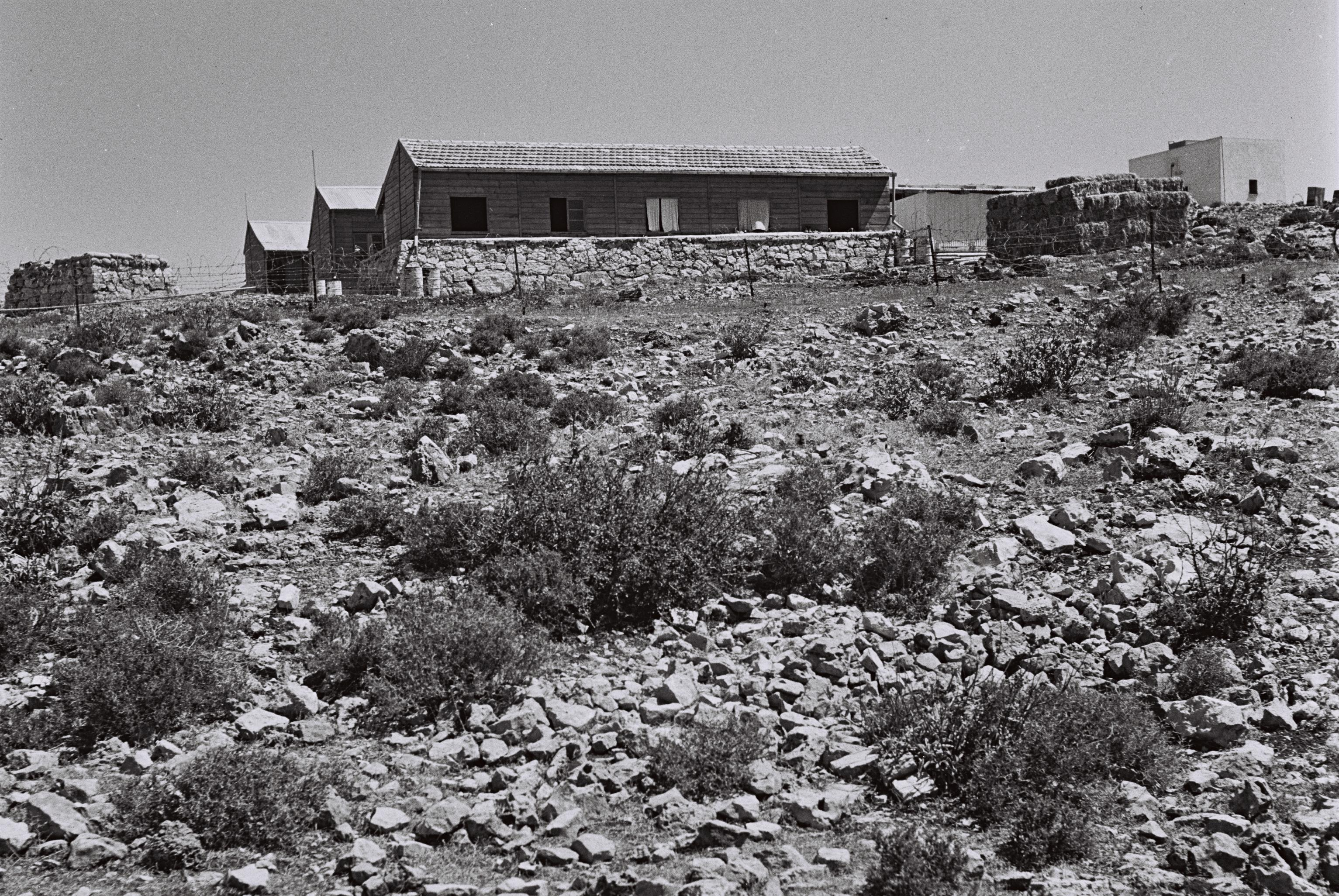
Kibbutz Ein Tzurim, 1947

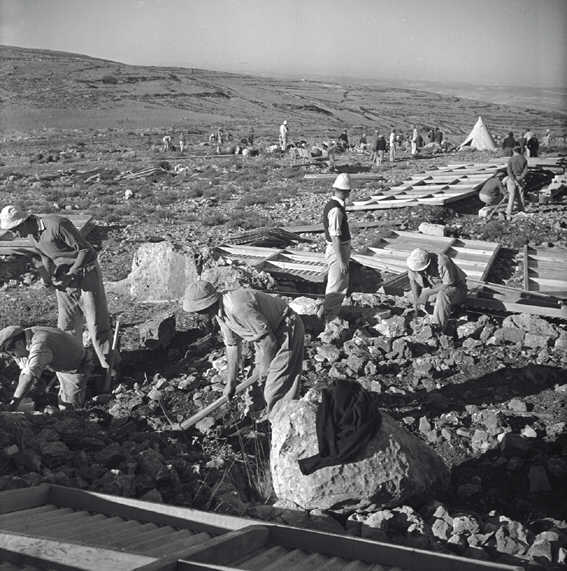
Ein Tzurim under construction October 1946

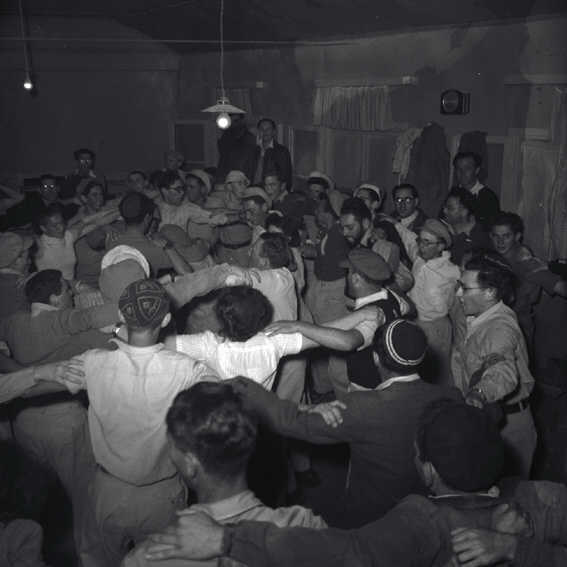
Ein Tzurim Aliyah celebrations October 1946
