= Migdal Eder =

Migdal Eder may refer to:

- Migdal Eder, an Orthodox Jewish farming community founded in 1927 at the modern-day Kfar Etzion settlement
- Migdal Eder (biblical location), a biblical tower once standing near Bethlehem
