= Edar =

Edar or EDAR may refer to:

- Edar (Bible), a tower
- Ectodysplasin A receptor, a protein
- E.D.Ar., an abbreviation for the United States District Court for the Eastern District of Arkansas
