= Masu'ot Yitzhak =

Moshav in southern Israel

Masu'ot Yitzhak: מְשּׂוּאוֹת יִצְחָק (Hebrew); مسؤوت اسحاق / مسؤوت يتسحاك (Arabic)

Hebrew transcription(s)
  - Standard: Mesu'ot Yitzhak
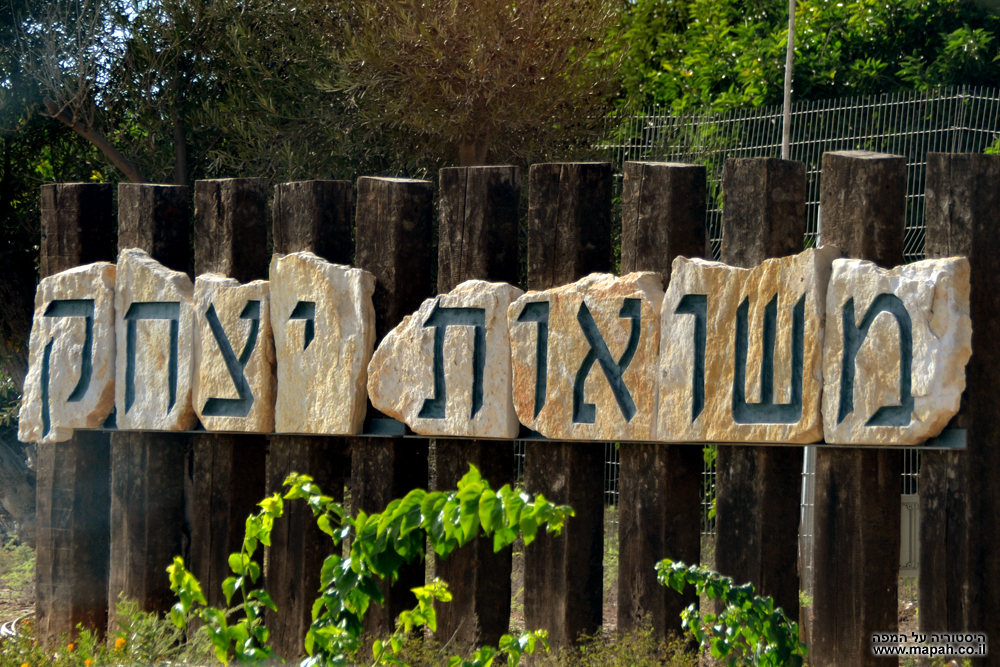

- Location within Ashkelon region of Israel
- Coordinates: 31°42′12″N 34°41′22″E
- Country: Israel
- District: Southern
- Subdistrict: Ashkelon
- Council: Shafir
- Affiliation: Hapoel HaMizrachi
- Founded: 1945 (in Gush Etzion); 1949 (current location)
- Founder: Central European Jewish immigrants
- Population (2024): 731
- Website: www.massuot.co.il

Masu'ot Yitzhak (Hebrew: מְשּׂוּאוֹת יִצְחָק, lit. Yitzhak's Beacons) is a moshav shitufi in southern Israel. Located near Ashkelon, it falls under the jurisdiction of Shafir Regional Council. The original kibbutz in Gush Etzion was destroyed and depopulated in the 1948 Arab–Israeli War, and a new settlement was established in 1949 in a different location. In 2024 it had a population of 731.

== History ==
Kibbutz Masu'ot Yitzhak was founded in 1945 in Gush Etzion, midway between Jerusalem and Hebron. The settlers were young pioneers from Hungary, Czechoslovakia, and Germany who arrived before World War II. The kibbutz was named for the chief rabbi of Mandatory Palestine, Yitzhak HaLevi Herzog.

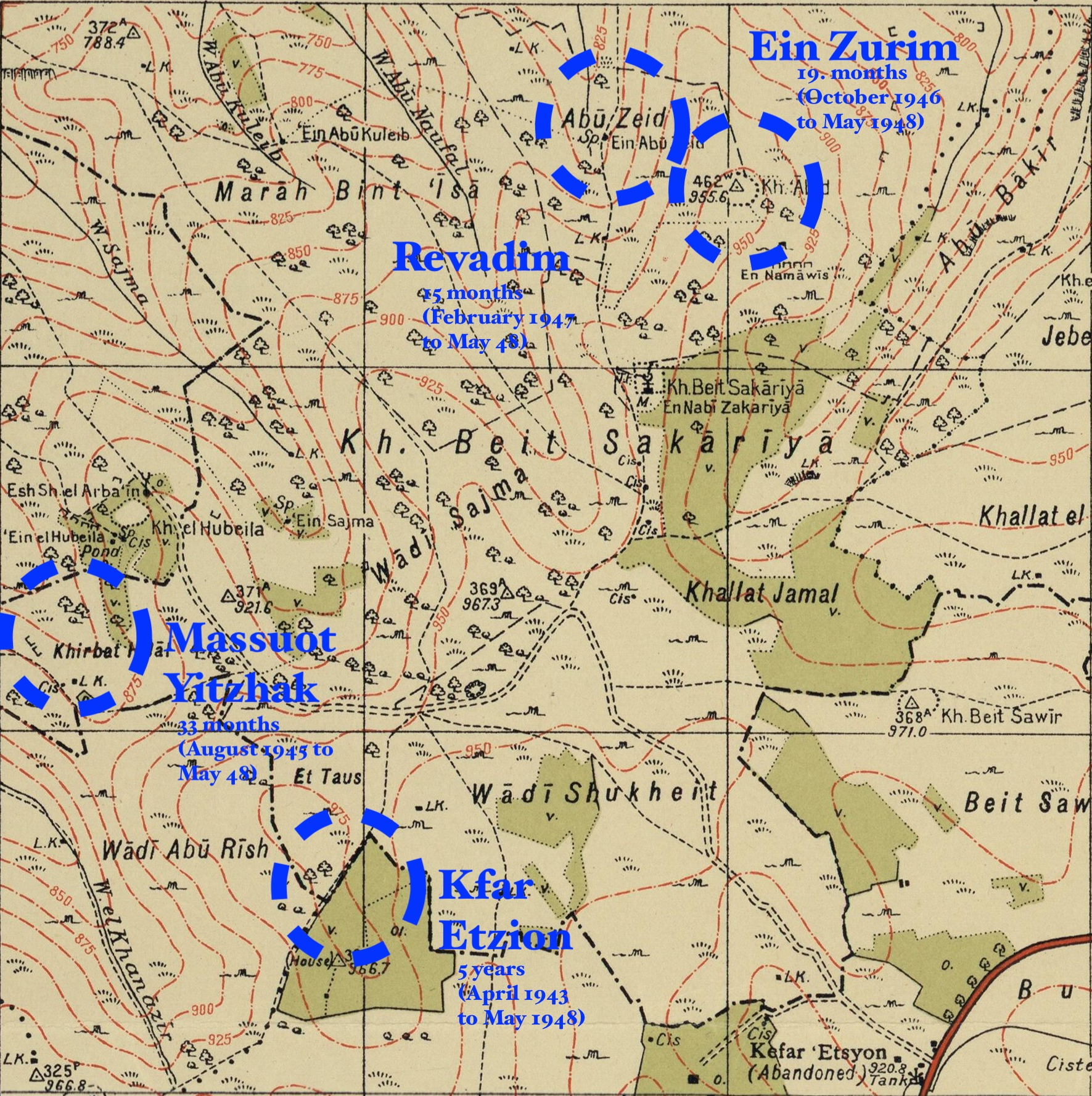
The four kibbutzes of the Gush Etzion at the time of the 1948 war (Kfar Etzion, Ein Zurim, Massuot Yitzhak, Revadim) overlaid on a 1943 Survey of Palestine map

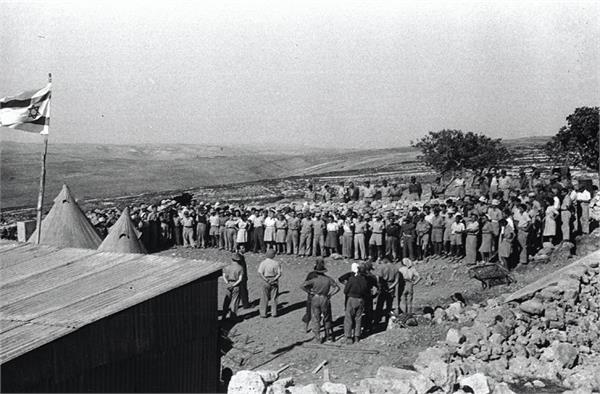
Masu’ot Yitzhak founders October 1945

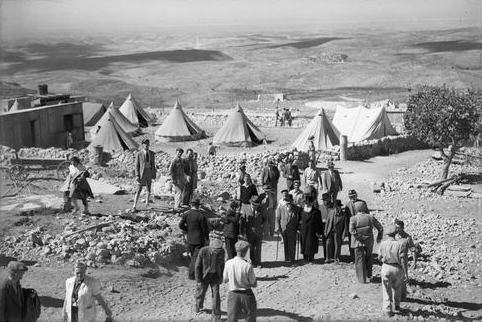
Musu'ot Yitzhak. 31 October 1945

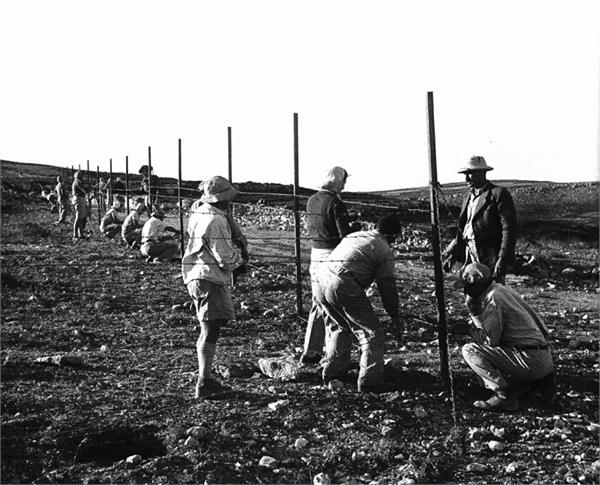
Masu’ot Yitzhak fencing 1945

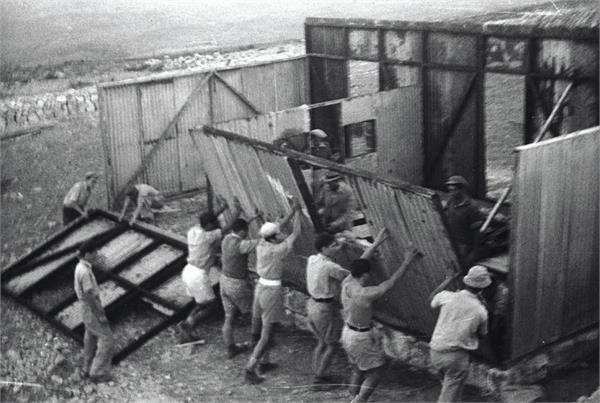
Masu’ot Yitzhak first buildings 1945

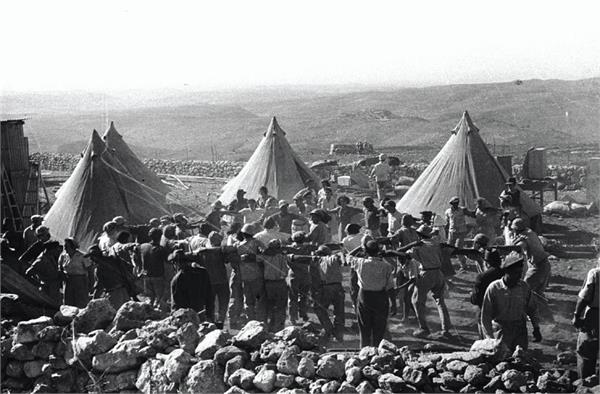
Masu’ot Yitzhak celebrations 1945

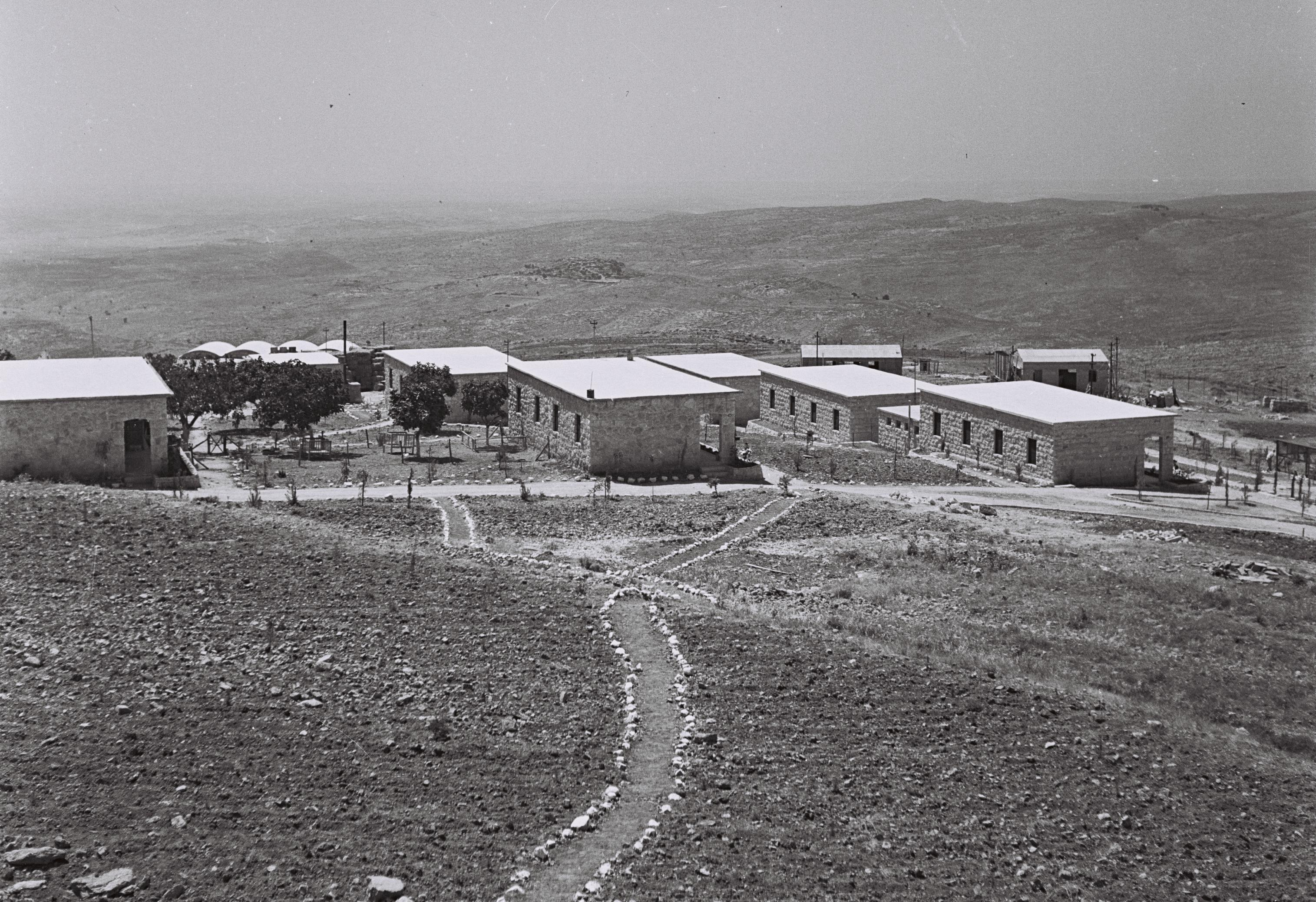
Mas'uot Yitzhak, 1947

The settlers of Masu'ot Yitzhak rose to the challenge of living in the Judean Mountains, building homes and planting orchards. In 1948, Gush Etzion was captured by the Arab Legion. The residents of Kfar Etzion were massacred, and all other inhabitants of Gush Etzion, including the residents of Masu'ot Yitzhak, were captured and imprisoned in Jordan.

After their return from captivity in 1949, the Masu'ot Yitzhak pioneers established a new moshav of the same name near Shafir, a region inhabited by the Philistines in biblical times. Shafir had served as a base for the southern front of the Israeli army during the 1948 war, and the site at which the new Masu'ot Yitzhak was founded was located on the former lands of the depopulated Palestinian village of al-Sawafir al-Gharbiyya.

Tzahali, a military preparatory program for religious girls, is based in Masu'ot Yitzhak.

== Economy ==
The moshav economy is based on agriculture and industry. A reservoir was built 40 years ago to harness the winter flood waters of Nahal Lachish for farming. The water is used to irrigate 125 acres (0.51 km^{2}) of avocado trees.
