= Al-Sawafir al-Shamaliyya =

al-Sawafir al-Shamaliyya السوافير الشمالية al-Sawafir al-Halil, Suafir Ibn Audeh, Saouafir ech-Chemalieh Saouafir, Abou -A'ouarr, Sawalir Shamali, Sawafir esh Shamaliya, sawafir ode
- Etymology: "The northern nomads"
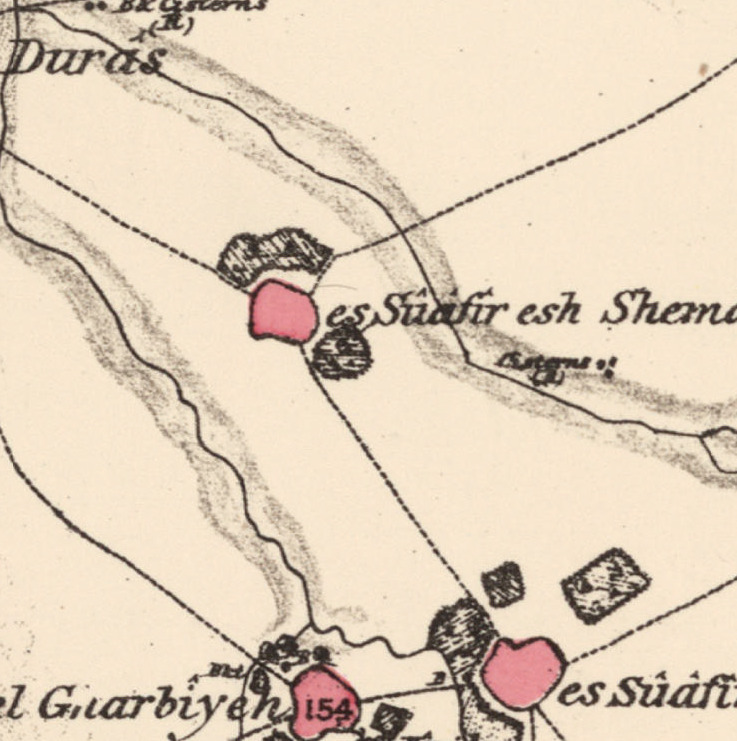
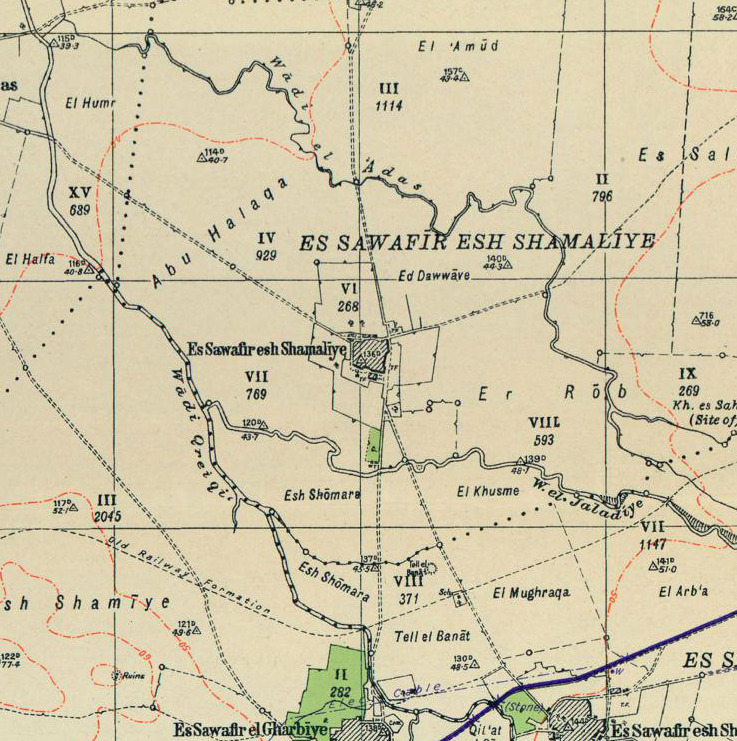
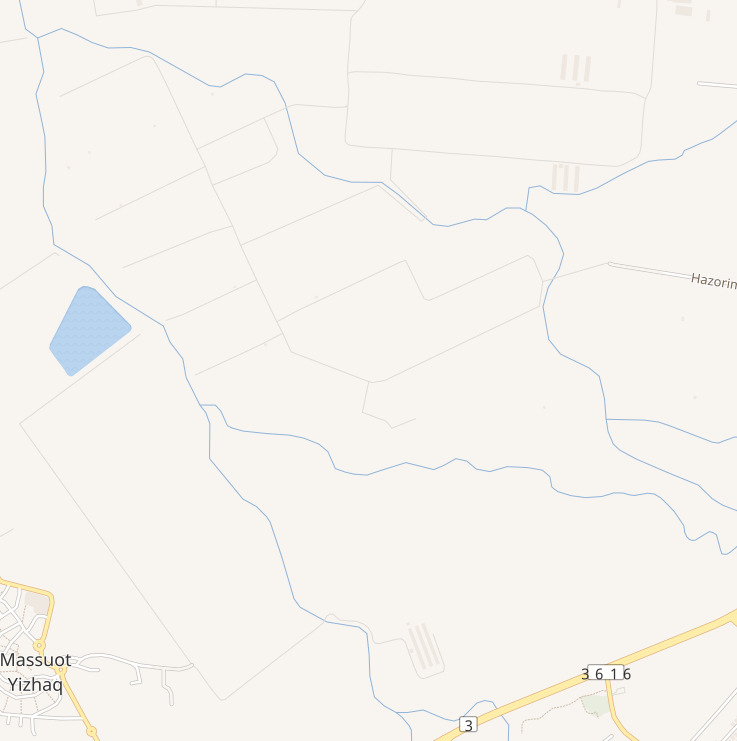
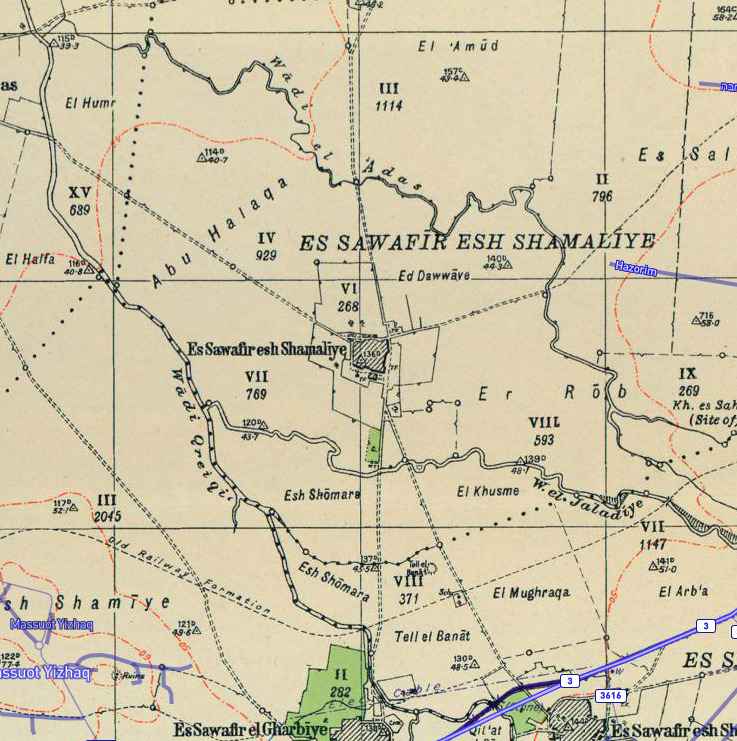
- 1870s map 1940s map modern map 1940s with modern overlay map A series of historical maps of the area around Al-Sawafir al-Shamaliyya (click the buttons)

- Location within Mandatory Palestine
- Coordinates: 31°42′48″N 34°42′15″E
- Palestine grid: 122/124
- Geopolitical entity: Mandatory Palestine
- Subdistrict: Gaza
- Date of depopulation: May 18, 1948

Area
  - Total: 5,861 dunams (5.861 km^{2}; 2.263 sq mi)

Population (1945)
  - Total: 680
- Cause(s) of depopulation: Fear of being caught up in the fighting

Al-Sawafir al-Shamaliyya (Arabic: السوافير الشمالية) was a Palestinian Arab village in the Gaza Subdistrict, located 33 kilometers (21 mi) northeast of Gaza along the southern coastal plain of Palestine 50 meters (160 ft) above sea level. It was one of three namesake villages, alongside Al-Sawafir al-Sharqiyya and Al-Sawafir al-Gharbiyya.

It had a population of 680 in 1945. Al-Sawafir al-Shamaliyya was depopulated in the 1948 Arab-Israeli War.

== History ==
The village was possibly located at the site of the biblical Shafir, mentioned by Eusibius as a "beautiful town" between Ascalon and Bayt Jibrin. Most modern scholars, however, located Shafir at Khirbat al-Qawm. The Crusader name of the village was Zeophir. They recorded that it was the property of Bishop of Jerusalem in the early 12th century. However, it is not clear which village of three Sawafirs these records pertain to.

=== Ottoman era ===
Incorporated into the Ottoman Empire in 1517 with the rest of Palestine, Al-Sawafir al-Shamaliya appears in the 1596 tax records as Sawafir al-Halil. It was under the administration of the nahiya of Gaza, part of the Liwa of Gaza. The village contained 112 households, 71 were Muslim and 41 Christians. With a total population of an estimated 616, the villagers paid a fixed tax-rate of 33,3 % on agricultural products, including wheat, barley, olive and fruit trees; a total of 19,550 akçe. All of the revenues went to a waqf.

In 1838 the three Sawafir villages were noted located in the Gaza district. The western village (=Al-Sawafir al-Gharbiyya) was noted as "in ruins or deserted", while the two others were noted as being Muslim.

In 1863, French explorer Victor Guérin visited the village, which he estimated had five hundred inhabitants. He found three barrels of broken ancient columns of gray-white marble near a well. A koubbeh there was dedicated to a Sheikh Sidi Abd-Allah.

An Ottoman village list of about 1870 found 55 houses and a population of 171, though the population count included men only.

In 1882 the PEF's Survey of Western Palestine (SWP) found that al-Sawafir al-Shamaliyya had several small gardens and wells.

=== British Mandate era ===
In the 1922 census of Palestine conducted by the British Mandate authorities, the village had a population of 334 inhabitants, consisting of 333 Muslims and 1 Christian, increasing in the 1931 census to an all-Muslim population of 454 in 77 houses.

In the 1945 statistics the population of Sawafir esh Shamaliya was 680 Muslims, while the total land area was 5,861 dunams, according to an official land and population survey. Of this, a total of 670 dunams were used citrus and bananas, 10 were for plantations and irrigable land, 4,894 for cereals, while 21 dunams were built-up areas.

Many of its houses were built of adobe, although few were made of stone. The residents were Muslim, and the village had its own mosque, but shared a school with the neighboring villages of al-Sawafir al-Gharbiyya and al-Sawafir al-Sharqiyya. The number of students in the school was 280 in the mid-1940s. Agriculture was the mainstay of the economy, and grain, citrus, grapes, and apricots were grown.

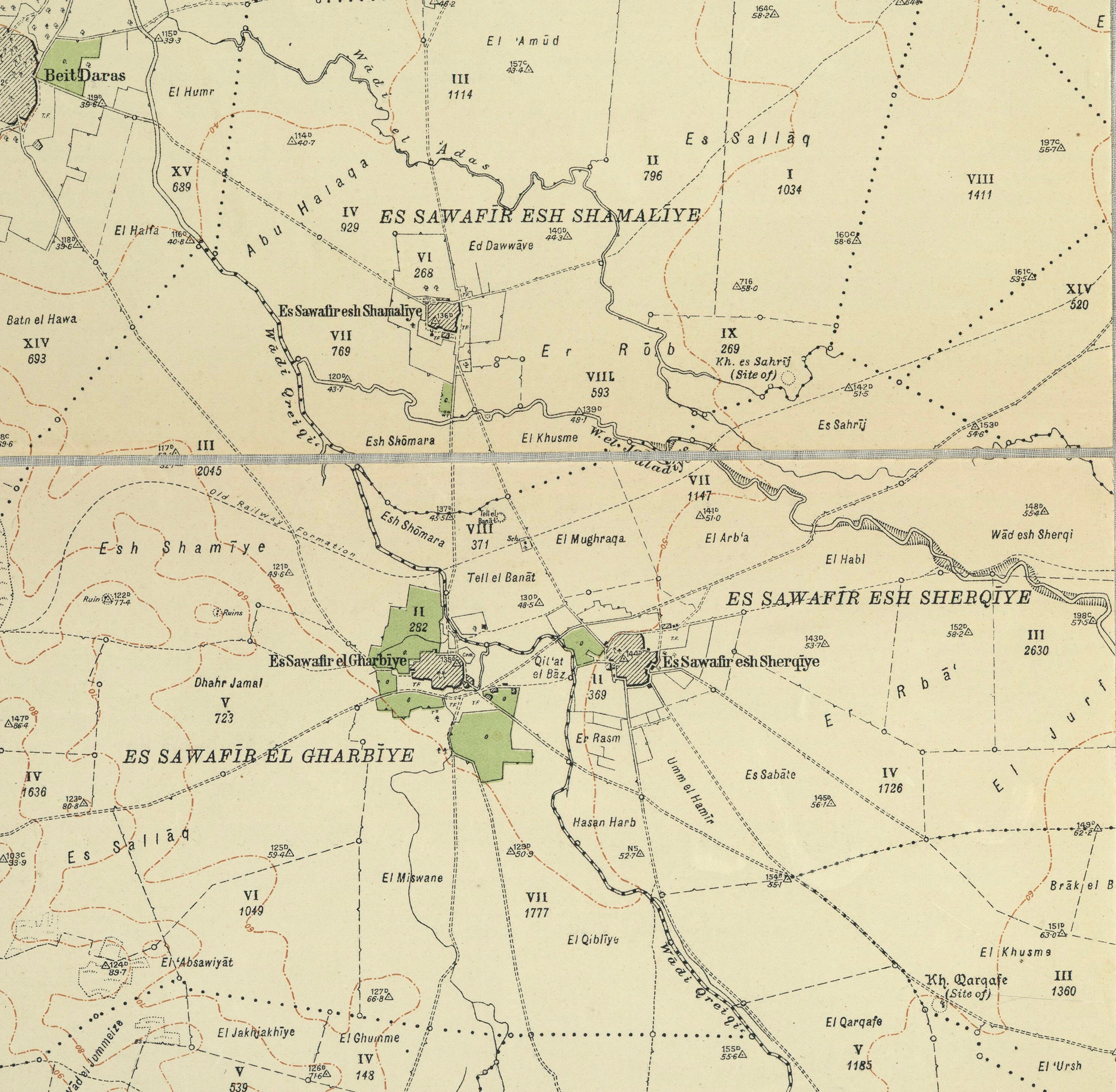
Al-Sawafir al-Shamaliyya 1930 1:20,000

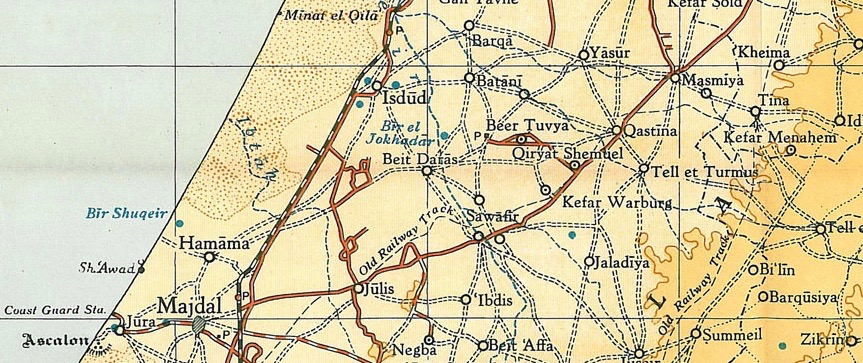
Sawafir 1945 1:250,000

=== 1948 War and aftermath ===
In early May, 1948, the inhabitants of the three Al-Sawafir villages were ordered not to flee, by the Al-Majdal National Committee.

Al-Sawafir al-Shamaliyya was captured by the Haganah in Operation Barak on May 12. Its residents may have been pushed out by the attack on Bayt Daras on May 10 which was preceded by a mortar attack, but it's more likely that the village was depopulated on the attack of the village itself, according to an Associated Press dispatch which quoted a Haganah source. At the 23 May 1948, Israeli reports say that at all the three Al-Sawafir villages the inhabitants slept in the fields at night, but returned to work in the villages by day.

At the near end of the 1948 Arab-Israeli War, Egyptian and Sudanese forces planned to recapture al-Sawafir al-Shamaliyya, but were prevented from doing so at an early stage.

Following the war the area was incorporated into the State of Israel, but the land was left undeveloped. According to Palestinian historian, Walid Khalidi, "A few vacant houses and segments of houses, standing amidst wild vegetation, mark the site. One of them has a covered porch supported on two columns. An old village road is also identifiable, and cactuses and fig trees grow on the site."

== See also ==
- Depopulated Palestinian locations in Israel

== Bibliography ==
- Barron, J. B., ed. (1923). Palestine: Report and General Abstracts of the Census of 1922. Government of Palestine.
- Conder, C.R.; Kitchener, H. H. (1882). The Survey of Western Palestine: Memoirs of the Topography, Orography, Hydrography, and Archaeology. Vol. 2. London: Committee of the Palestine Exploration Fund.
- Department of Statistics (1945). Village Statistics, April, 1945. Government of Palestine.
- Guérin, V. (1869). Description Géographique Historique et Archéologique de la Palestine (in French). Vol. 1: Judee, pt. 2. Paris: L'Imprimerie Nationale.
- Hadawi, S. (1970). Village Statistics of 1945: A Classification of Land and Area ownership in Palestine. Palestine Liberation Organization Research Center. Archived from the original on 2018-12-08.
- Hütteroth, W.-D.; Abdulfattah, K. (1977). Historical Geography of Palestine, Transjordan and Southern Syria in the Late 16th Century. Erlanger Geographische Arbeiten, Sonderband 5. Erlangen, Germany: Vorstand der Fränkischen Geographischen Gesellschaft. ISBN 3-920405-41-2.
- Khalidi, W. (1992). All That Remains: The Palestinian Villages Occupied and Depopulated by Israel in 1948. Washington D.C.: Institute for Palestine Studies. ISBN 0-88728-224-5.
- Mills, E., ed. (1932). Census of Palestine 1931. Population of Villages, Towns and Administrative Areas. Jerusalem: Government of Palestine.
- Morris, B. (2004). The Birth of the Palestinian Refugee Problem Revisited. Cambridge University Press. ISBN 978-0-521-00967-6.
- Palmer, E. H. (1881). The Survey of Western Palestine: Arabic and English Name Lists Collected During the Survey by Lieutenants Conder and Kitchener, R. E. Transliterated and Explained by E.H. Palmer. Committee of the Palestine Exploration Fund.
- Petersen, Andrew (2005). The Towns of Palestine Under Muslim Rule. British Archaeological Reports. ISBN 1841718211.
- Robinson, E.; Smith, E. (1841). Biblical Researches in Palestine, Mount Sinai and Arabia Petraea: A Journal of Travels in the year 1838. Vol. 2. Boston: Crocker & Brewster.
- Robinson, E.; Smith, E. (1841). Biblical Researches in Palestine, Mount Sinai and Arabia Petraea: A Journal of Travels in the year 1838. Vol. 3. Boston: Crocker & Brewster.
- Socin, A. (1879). "Alphabetisches Verzeichniss von Ortschaften des Paschalik Jerusalem". Zeitschrift des Deutschen Palästina-Vereins. 2: 135–163.
