= Al-Sawafir al-Gharbiyya =

Al-Sawafir al-Gharbiyya السوافير الغربية
- Etymology: The western nomads
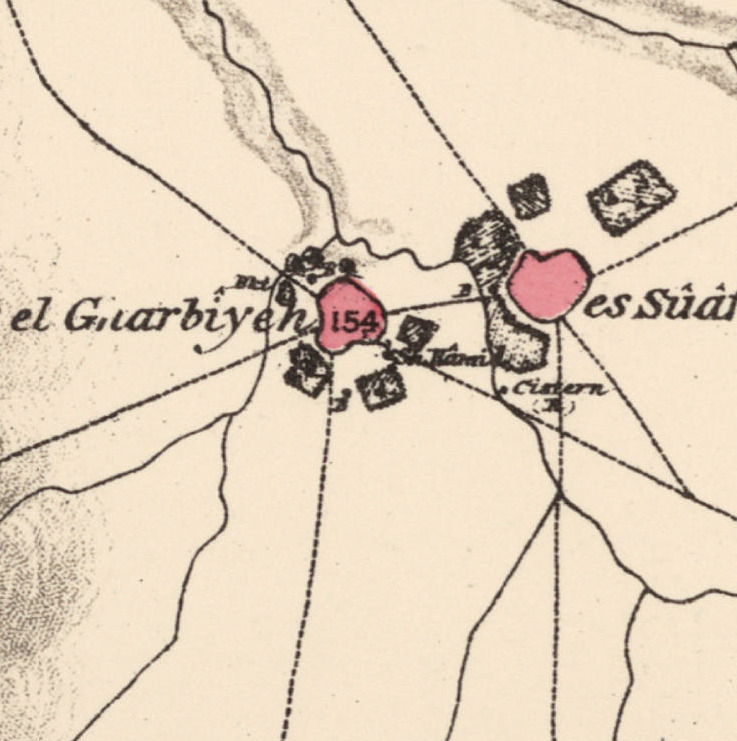
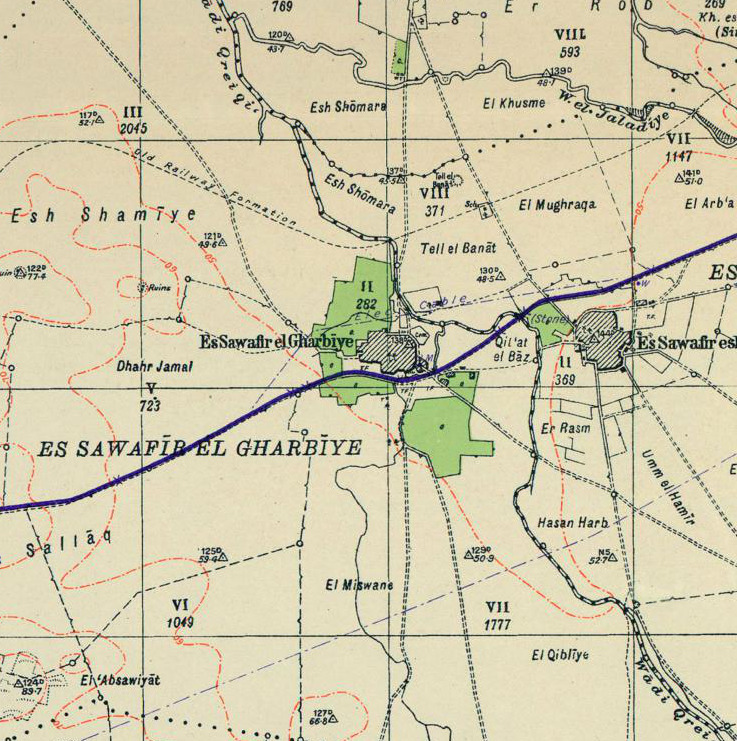
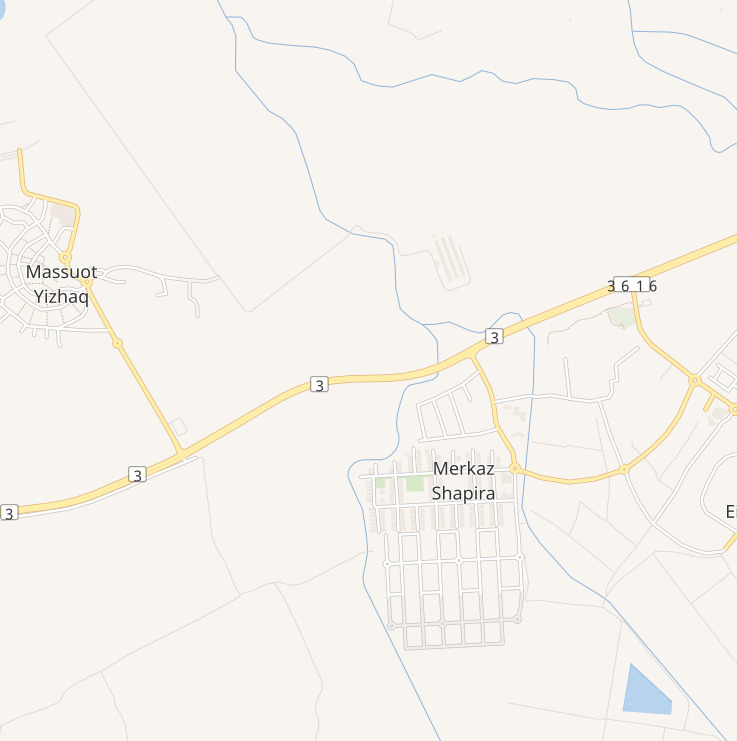
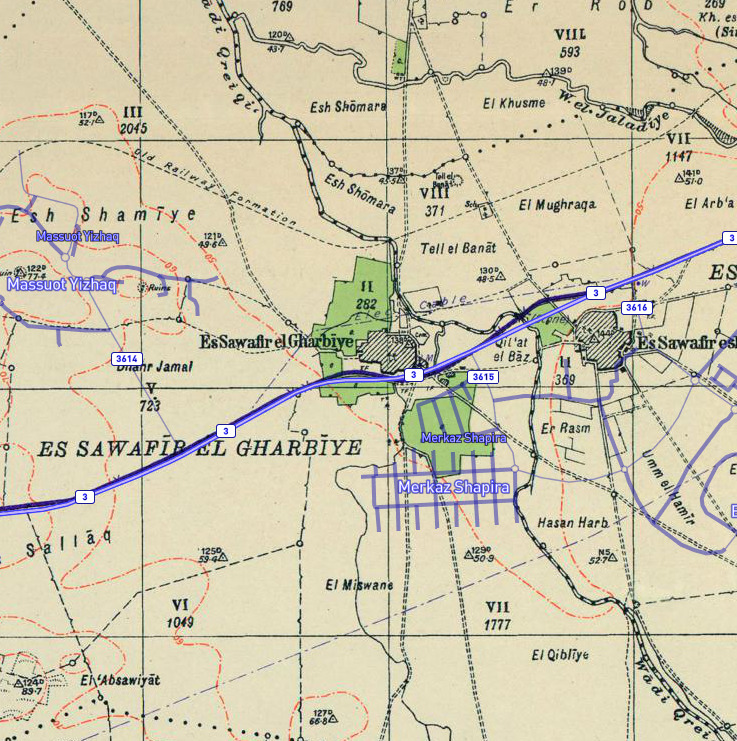
- 1870s map 1940s map modern map 1940s with modern overlay map A series of historical maps of the area around Al-Sawafir al-Gharbiyya (click the buttons)

- Location within Mandatory Palestine
- Coordinates: 31°41′57″N 34°42′11″E
- Palestine grid: 122/123
- Geopolitical entity: Mandatory Palestine
- Subdistrict: Gaza
- Date of depopulation: May 18, 1948

Area
  - Total: 7,523 dunams (7.523 km^{2}; 2.905 sq mi)

Population (1945)
  - Total: 1,030
- Cause(s) of depopulation: Fear of being caught up in the fighting
- Current Localities: Merkaz Shapira, Masu'ot Yitzhak,

Al-Sawafir al-Gharbiyya (Arabic: السوافير الغربية) was a Palestinian Arab village in the Gaza Subdistrict. It was depopulated during the 1948 War on May 18, 1948, during the second stage of Operation Barak. It was located 30 km northeast of Gaza city. It was one of three namesake villages alongside Al-Sawafir al-Sharqiyya and Al-Sawafir al-Shamaliyya.

== History ==
Remains of a winepress and a hypocausts, belonging to a bathhouse, both dating to the late Roman era, have been excavated here.

Two cemeteries from the Byzantine era, together with many ceramic remains from fifth–seventh centuries CE have been excavated. Two pool areas, building remains, and parts of a potter's wheel, all dating to the Byzantine era have also been found. A Greek inscription has been found on a limestone slab, and the remains of a wall, with numerous pottery sherds, dating to the Byzantine period (fifth–sixth centuries CE).

12 century Crusader church endowments mention Latin settlement in Zeophir. However, it is not clear which village of three Sawafirs these records pertain to.

Pottery sherds from the Mamluk era has also been found.

=== Ottoman era ===
Al-Sawafir al-Gharbiyya was incorporated into the Ottoman Empire in 1517 with the rest of Palestine, and by the 1596 Defter, the village formed part nahiya (subdistrict) of Gaza under the liwa' (district) of Gaza with a population of 43 households, or an estimated 237 Muslims. The villagers paid a fixed tax-rate of 25% on a number of crops, including wheat, barley, summer crops, vineyards, fruit trees, as well as on goats, beehives; a total of 8,500 Akçe.

In 1838 the three Sawafir villages were noted located in the Gaza district. The western village was noted as "in ruins or deserted,” while the two others were noted as being Muslim.

In 1863 Victor Guérin found in this village a koubbeh consecrated to a Sheikh Muhammed. He noted that many antique building blocks were used in this sanctuary.

In 1882 the PEF's Survey of Western Palestine described it as one of three Suafir adobe villages. Each had small gardens and wells.

=== British Mandate era ===
According to the 1922 census of Palestine conducted by the British Mandate authorities, Al-Sawafir al-Gharbiyya had a population of 572 inhabitants, all Muslims, increasing in the 1931 census when it had an all-Muslim population of 723 in 134 houses.

By the 1945 statistics, this had increased to 1,030 Muslims, with a total of 7,523 dunams of land. Of this, 585 dunums were for plantations or irrigable land, 6,663 dunums were for cereals, while 585 dunams were classified as un-cultivable land.

al-Sawafir al-Gharbiyya had shared a school with the other two Sawafir villages, and in 1945 it had an enrollment of about 280.

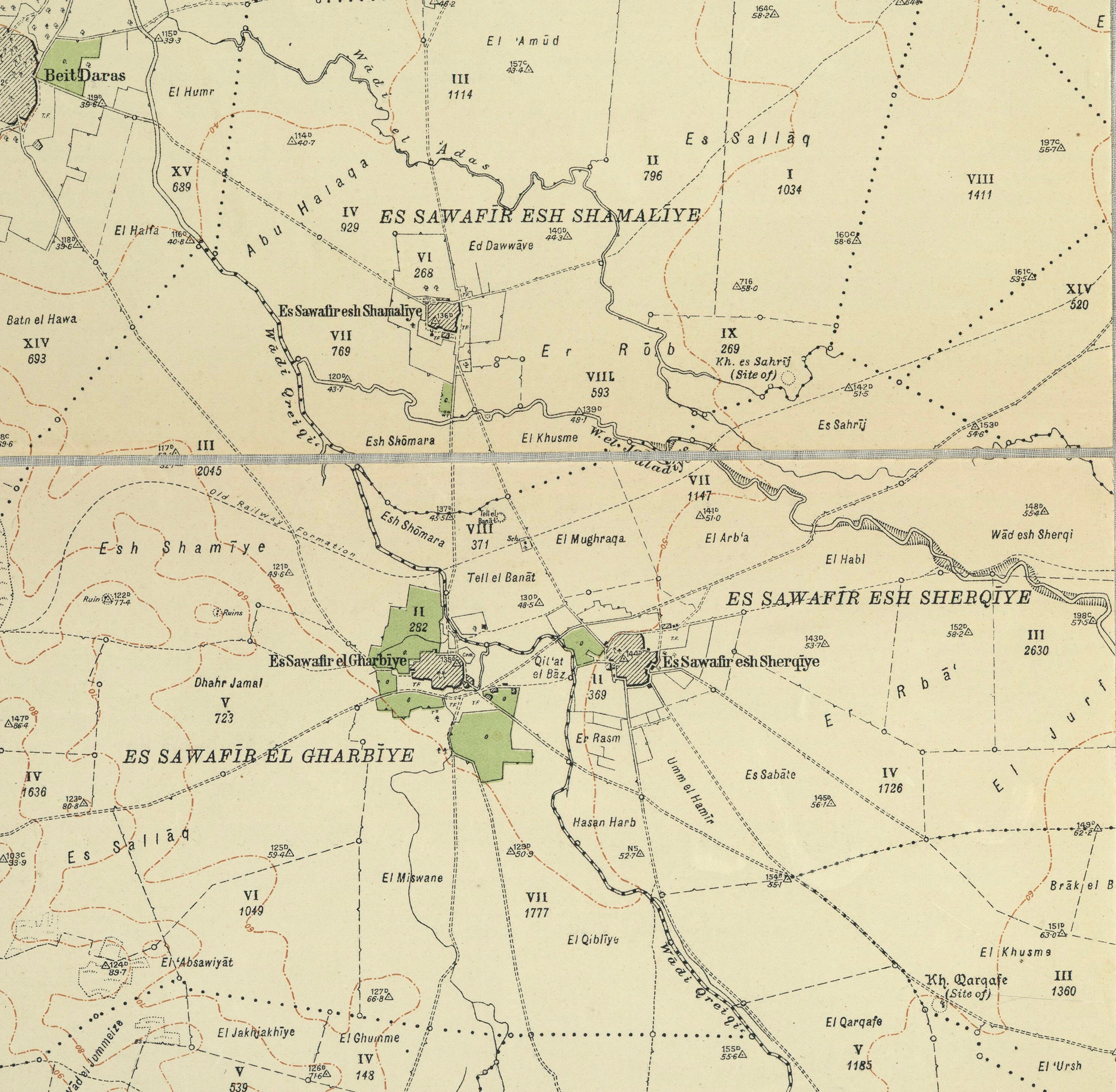
Al-Sawafir al-Gharbiyya 1930 1:20,000

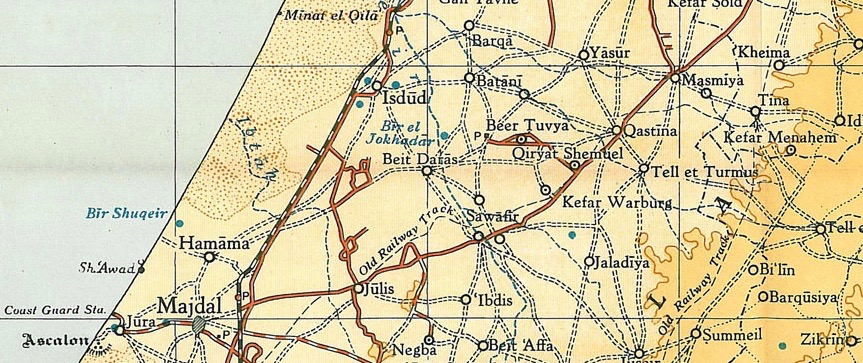
Sawafir 1945 1:250,000

=== 1948 and aftermath ===
In early May, 1948, the inhabitants of the three Al-Sawafir villages were ordered not to flee, by the Al-Majdal National Committee.

On May 18, the Givati Brigade for a second time conquered Al-Sawafir al-Sharqiyya together with Al-Sawafir al-Gharbiyya. Their operational orders were: "To conquer the villages, to cleanse them of inhabitants (women and children should [also] be expelled), to take several prisoners....[and] to burn the greatest number of houses." The Givati troops torched and blew up several houses, however, after they withdrew, the Palestinian villagers returned. At the 23 May 1948, Israeli reports say that at all the three Al-Sawafir villages the inhabitants slept in the fields at night, but returned to work in the villages by day. By late June, both Al-Sawafir al-Sharqiyya and Al-Sawafir al-Gharbiyya were again "full of Arabs."

Following the war the area was incorporated into the State of Israel, with the villages of Merkaz Shapira and Masu'ot Yitzhak established on Al-Sawafir al-Gharbiyya land.

== Bibliography ==
- Baumgarten, Ya‘aqov (2005-01-01). "Es-Sawafir el-Gharbiya Final Report" (117). Hadashot Arkheologiyot – Excavations and Surveys in Israel. Archived from the original on 2012-06-14.
- Barron, J. B., ed. (1923). Palestine: Report and General Abstracts of the Census of 1922. Government of Palestine.
- Conder, C.R.; Kitchener, H. H. (1882). The Survey of Western Palestine: Memoirs of the Topography, Orography, Hydrography, and Archaeology. Vol. 2. London: Committee of the Palestine Exploration Fund.
- Dauphin, C. (1998). La Palestine byzantine, Peuplement et Populations. BAR International Series 726 (in French). Vol. III : Catalogue. Oxford: Archeopress. ISBN 0-860549-05-4.
- Department of Statistics (1945). Village Statistics, April, 1945. Government of Palestine.
- Eisenberg-Degen, Davida (2016-04-05). "Es-Sawafir el-Gharbiya Preliminary Report" (128). Hadashot Arkheologiyot – Excavations and Surveys in Israel.
- Fraiberg, Alexander (2014-09-28). "Es-Sawafir el-Gharbiya Final Report" (126). Hadashot Arkheologiyot – Excavations and Surveys in Israel.
- Guérin, V. (1869). Description Géographique Historique et Archéologique de la Palestine. Vol. 1: Judee, pt. 2. Paris, L'Imprimerie Imp.
- Hadawi, S. (1970). Village Statistics of 1945: A Classification of Land and Area ownership in Palestine. Palestine Liberation Organization Research Center. Archived from the original on 2018-12-08.
- Hütteroth, W.-D.; Abdulfattah, K. (1977). Historical Geography of Palestine, Transjordan and Southern Syria in the Late 16th Century. Erlanger Geographische Arbeiten, Sonderband 5. Erlangen, Germany: Vorstand der Fränkischen Geographischen Gesellschaft. ISBN 3-920405-41-2.
- Khalidi, W. (1992). All That Remains: The Palestinian Villages Occupied and Depopulated by Israel in 1948. Washington D.C.: Institute for Palestine Studies. ISBN 0-88728-224-5.
- Mills, E., ed. (1932). Census of Palestine 1931. Population of Villages, Towns and Administrative Areas. Jerusalem: Government of Palestine.
- Morris, B. (2004). The Birth of the Palestinian Refugee Problem Revisited. Cambridge University Press. ISBN 978-0-521-00967-6.
- Nasser, G.A. (1955–1973): "Memoirs" in Journal of Palestine Studies
  - " “Memoirs of the First Palestine War” in 2, no. 2 (Win. 73): 3–32, pdf-file, downloadable
- Palmer, E. H. (1881). The Survey of Western Palestine: Arabic and English Name Lists Collected During the Survey by Lieutenants Conder and Kitchener, R. E. Transliterated and Explained by E.H. Palmer. Committee of the Palestine Exploration Fund.
- Robinson, E.; Smith, E. (1841). Biblical Researches in Palestine, Mount Sinai and Arabia Petraea: A Journal of Travels in the year 1838. Vol. 2. Boston: Crocker & Brewster.
- Robinson, E.; Smith, E. (1841). Biblical Researches in Palestine, Mount Sinai and Arabia Petraea: A Journal of Travels in the year 1838. Vol. 3. Boston: Crocker & Brewster.
