= Gaza Subdistrict, Mandatory Palestine =

Administrative division of British Palestine (1920–1948)

Gaza Subdistrict قضاء غزة נפת עזה
- Subdistrict of Mandatory Palestine
- 1920–1948
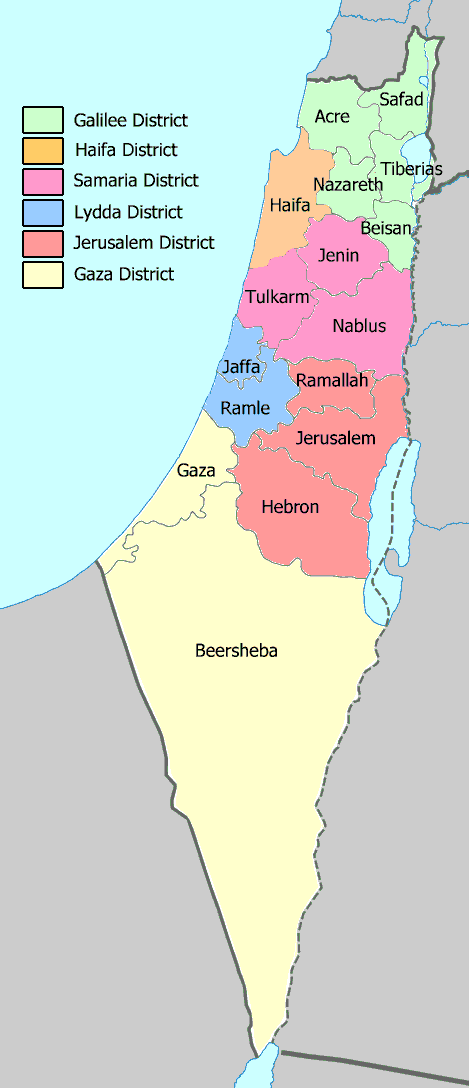
- Capital: Gaza
- History
  - Established: 1920
  - Disestablished: 1948
| Preceded by |
| Jerusalem Sanjak |
- Today part of: (Israel) Southern District (Palestine) Gaza Strip

The Gaza Subdistrict (Arabic: قضاء غزة; Hebrew: נפת עזה) was one of the subdistricts of Mandatory Palestine. It was situated in the southern Mediterranean coastline of the British Mandate of Palestine. After the 1948 Arab-Israeli War, the district disintegrated, with Israel controlling the northern and eastern portions while Egypt held control of the southern and central parts – which became the Gaza Strip, under Egyptian military between 1948 and 1967, Israeli military rule between 1967 and 2005, part of the Palestinian National Authority (with some aspects of retained Israeli rule until the 2005 withdrawal) after the Oslo Accords until 2007, and is currently ruled by the Hamas as a de facto separate entity from the Palestinian National Authority. The parts which Israel held since 1948 were merged into Israeli administrative districts, their connection with Gaza severed.

== Borders ==
- Beersheba Subdistrict (Southeast)
- Ramle Subdistrict (Northeast)
- Hebron Subdistrict (East)
- Egypt (Southwest)

== Towns and villages ==
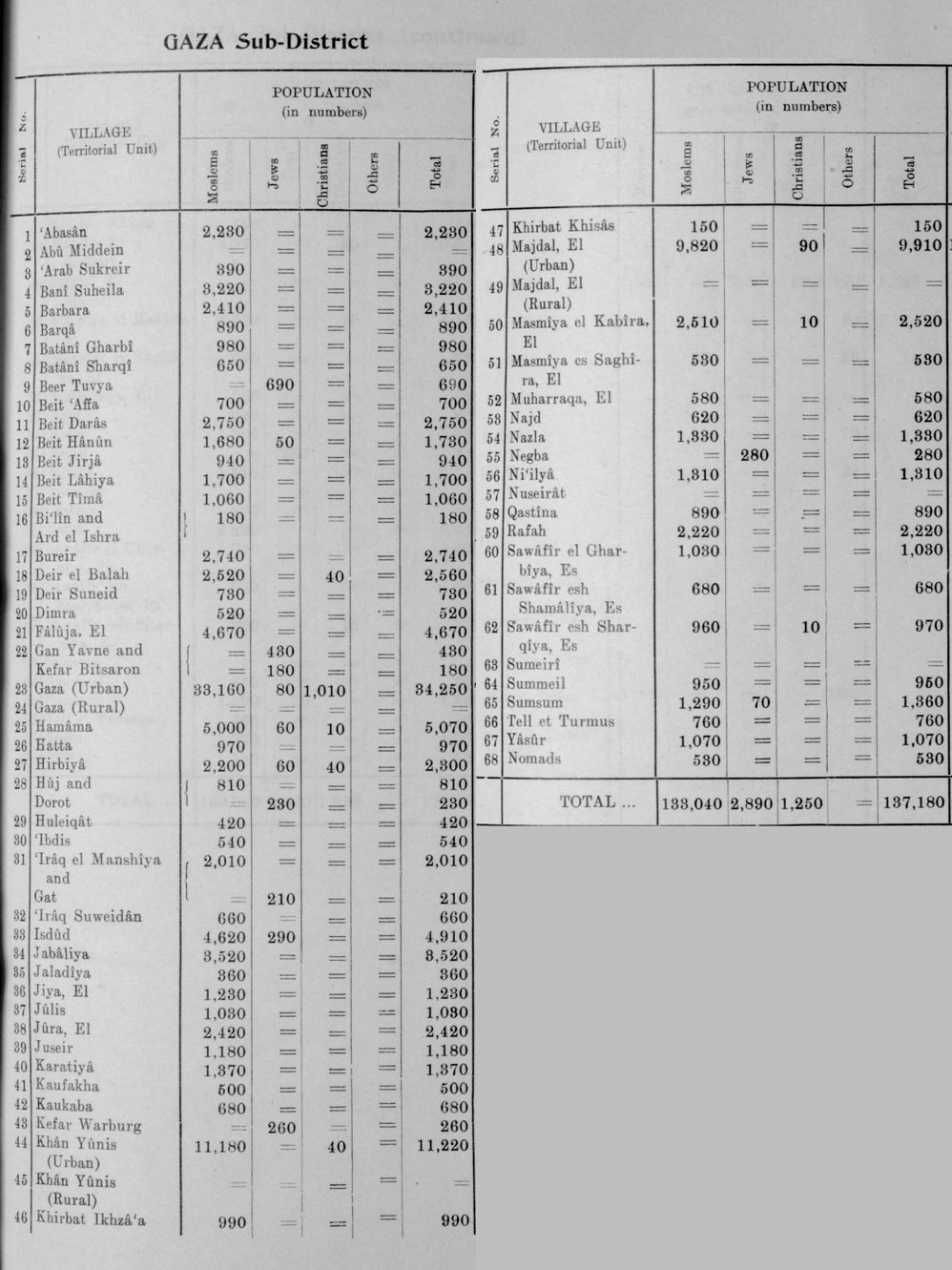
Official population statistics for the sub-district, from Village Statistics, 1945.

Gaza Sub-District – Population by Village (Village Statistics, 1945)
| Village | Muslims | Jews | Christians | Others | Total |
|---|---|---|---|---|---|
| ‘Abasân | 2,230 | | | | 2,230 |
| Abu Midein | | | | | |
| ‘Arab Sukreir | 390 | | | | 390 |
| Bani Suheila | 3,220 | | | | 3,220 |
| Barbara | 2,410 | | | | 2,410 |
| Barqā | 890 | | | | 890 |
| Batāni Gharbi | 980 | | | | 980 |
| Batāni Sharqi | 650 | | | | 650 |
| Beit Ṭuwwa | | 690 | | | 690 |
| Beit ‘Affa | 700 | | | | 700 |
| Beit Darās | 2,750 | | | | 2,750 |
| Beit Hānūn | 1,680 | 50 | | | 1,730 |
| Beit Jirjā | 940 | | | | 940 |
| Beit Lāhiya | 1,700 | | | | 1,700 |
| Beit Ṭimā | 1,060 | | | | 1,060 |
| Bil‘īn and Ard el Ishra | 180 | | | | 180 |
| Bureir | 2,740 | | | | 2,740 |
| Deir el Balaḥ | 2,520 | | 40 | | 2,560 |
| Deir Suneid | 730 | | | | 730 |
| Dimra | 520 | | | | 520 |
| Fālūja, El | 4,670 | | | | 4,670 |
| Gan Yavne | | 430 | | | 430 |
| Kefar Bistaron | | 180 | | | 180 |
| Gaza (Urban) | 33,160 | 80 | 1,010 | | 34,250 |
| Gaza (Rural) | | | | | |
| Hamāma | 5,000 | 60 | 10 | | 5,070 |
| Hatta | 970 | | | | 970 |
| Hirbīya | 2,200 | 60 | 40 | | 2,300 |
| Hūj and Dorot | 810 | 230 | | | 1,040 |
| Huleiqāt | 420 | | | | 420 |
| ‘Ibdīs | 540 | | | | 540 |
| ‘Irāq el Manshiya and Gat | 2,010 | 210 | | | 2,220 |
| ‘Irāq Suweidān | 660 | | | | 660 |
| Isdūd | 4,620 | 290 | | | 4,910 |
| Jabāliya | 3,520 | | | | 3,520 |
| Jaldīya | 360 | | | | 360 |
| Jiya, El | 1,230 | | | | 1,230 |
| Jūlis | 1,030 | | | | 1,030 |
| Jūra, El | 2,420 | | | | 2,420 |
| Juseir | 1,180 | | | | 1,180 |
| Karatiyā | 1,370 | | | | 1,370 |
| Kaufakha | 500 | | | | 500 |
| Kaukaba | 680 | | | | 680 |
| Kefar Warburg | | 260 | | | 260 |
| Khān Yūnis (Urban) | 11,180 | | 40 | | 11,220 |
| Khān Yūnis (Rural) | | | | | |
| Khirbat Ikhāza‘a | 990 | | | | 990 |
| Khirbat Khisās | 150 | | | | 150 |
| Majdal, El (Urban) | 9,820 | | 90 | | 9,910 |
| Majdal, El (Rural) | | | | | |
| Masmiya el Kabīra, El | 2,510 | | 10 | | 2,520 |
| Masmiya es Saghīra, El | 530 | | | | 530 |
| Muḥarraqa, El | 580 | | | | 580 |
| Najd | 620 | | | | 620 |
| Nazla | 1,330 | | | | 1,330 |
| Negba | | 280 | | | 280 |
| Ni‘ilyā | 1,310 | | | | 1,310 |
| Nuseirāt | | | | | |
| Qastina | 890 | | | | 890 |
| Rafah | 2,220 | | | | 2,220 |
| Sawāfīr el Gharbīya, Es | 1,030 | | | | 1,030 |
| Sawāfīr es Shamālīya, Es | 680 | | | | 680 |
| Sawāfīr es Sharqīya, Es | 960 | | 10 | | 970 |
| Sumeirī | | | | | |
| Summeil | 950 | | | | 950 |
| Sumsum | 1,290 | 70 | | | 1,360 |
| Tell et Turmus | 760 | | | | 760 |
| Yasūr | 1,070 | | | | 1,070 |
| Nomads | 530 | | | | 530 |
| TOTAL | 133,040 | 2,890 | 1,250 | 0 | 137,180 |

Existing localities

- Abasan al-Kabera
- Abasan al-Saghira
- Bani Suheila
- al-Bayuk
- Beit Hanun
- Beit Lahia
- Deir al-Balah
- al-Fukhari
- Gaza City
- Jabalia
- Juhor ad-Dik
- Khan Yunis
- Khuza'a
- al-Mawasi
- Nuseirat
- Qa' al-Qurein
- al-Qarara
- Qizan an-Najjar
- Rafah
- Shokat as-Sufi
- Umm Kameil

=== Depopulated towns and villages ===
All of the localities captured by Israel were depopulated prior, during or after the 1948 War. al-Majdal was not destroyed.

Former localities

- Arab Suqrir
- Barbara
- Barqa
- al-Batani al-Gharbi
- al-Batani al-Sharqi
- Bayt Daras
- Bayt 'Affa
- Bayt Jirja
- Bayt Tima
- Bil'in
- Burayr
- Dayr Sunayd
- Dimra
- al-Faluja
- Hamama
- Hatta
- Hiribya
- Huj
- Hulayqat
- Ibdis
- Iraq al-Manshiyya
- Iraq Suwaydan
- Isdud
- al-Jaladiyya
- al-Jiyya
- Julis
- al-Jura
- Jusayr
- Karatiyya
- Kawfakha
- Kawkaba
- al-Khisas
- al-Masmiyya al-Kabira
- al-Masmiyya al-Saghira
- al-Muharraqa
- Najd
- Ni'ilya
- Qastina
- al-Sawafir al-Gharbiyya
- al-Sawafir al-Shamaliyya
- al-Sawafir al-Sharqiyya
- Simsim
- Summil
- Tall al-Turmus
- Yasur

== See also ==
- Gaza Sanjak
- Districts of Mandatory Palestine
- Gaza Governorate
- Southern District (Israel)
