= Al-Sawafir al-Sharqiyya =

Al-Sawafir al-Sharqiyya السوافير الشرقية Suafir Abu Huwar; from an inhabitant who died in the 19th century
- Etymology: The eastern nomads.
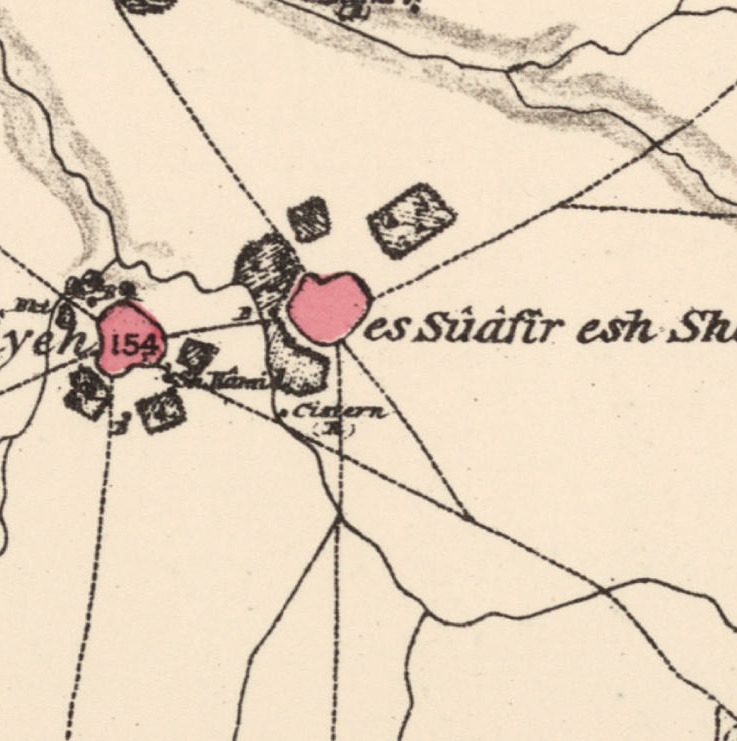
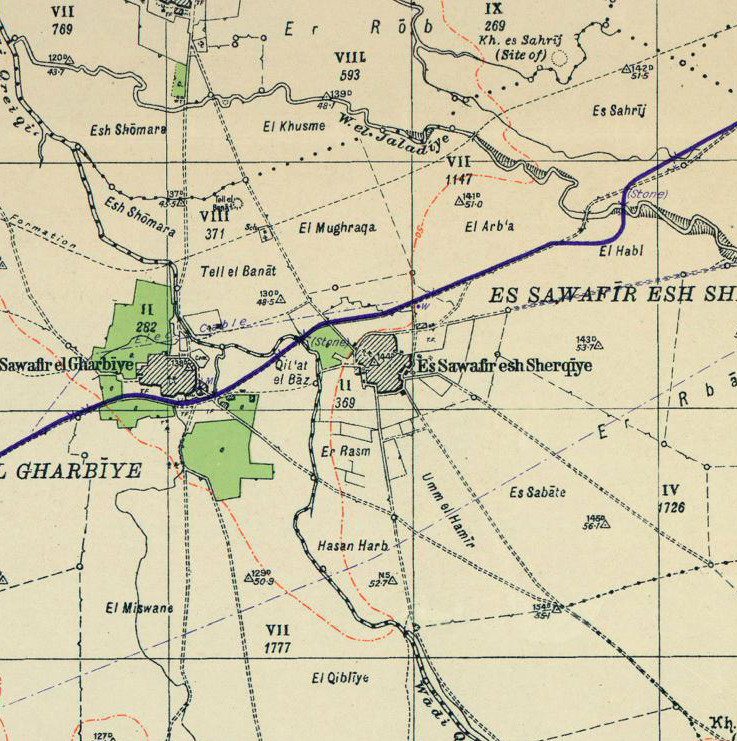
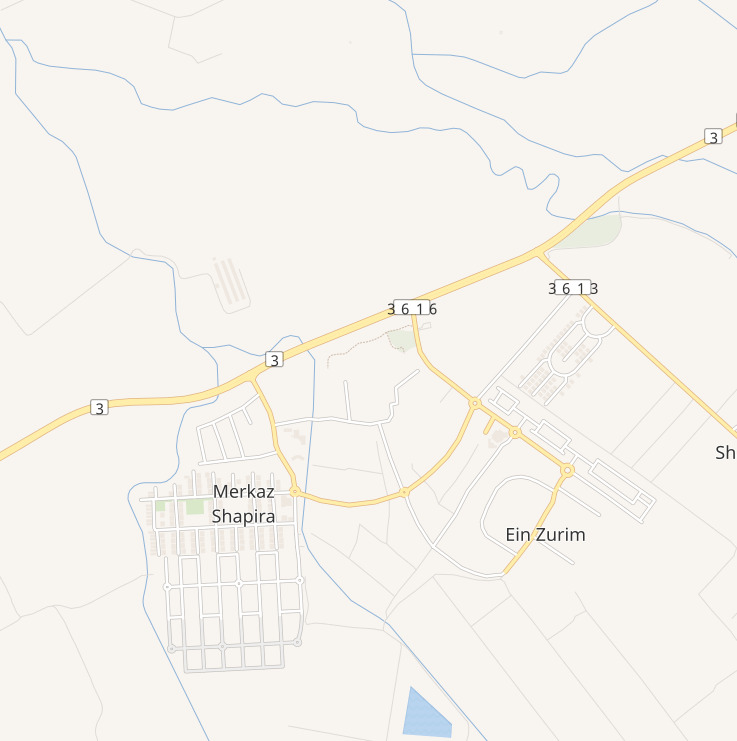
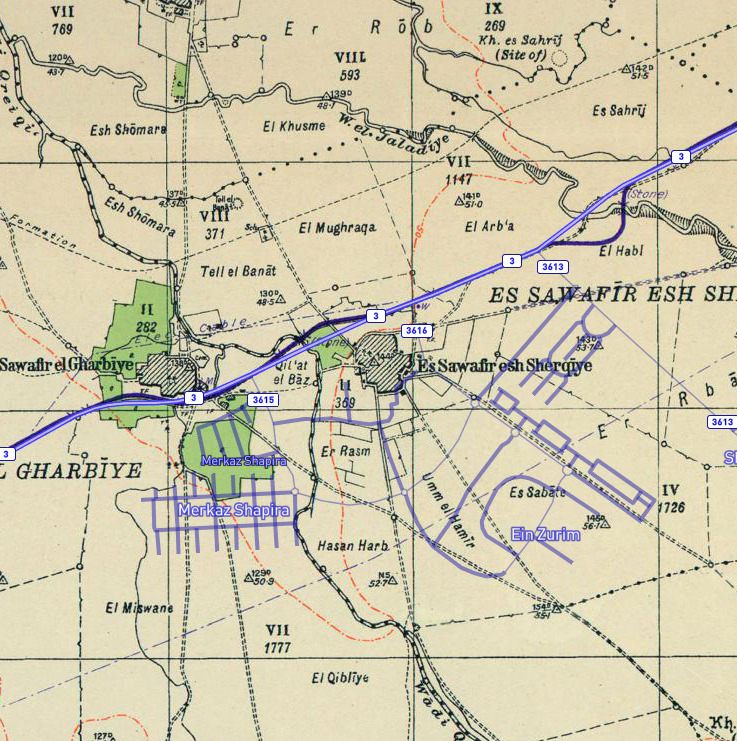
- 1870s map 1940s map modern map 1940s with modern overlay map A series of historical maps of the area around Al-Sawafir al-Sharqiyya (click the buttons)

- Location within Mandatory Palestine
- Coordinates: 31°42′00″N 34°42′45″E
- Palestine grid: 122/123
- Geopolitical entity: Mandatory Palestine
- Subdistrict: Gaza
- Date of depopulation: May 18, 1948

Area
  - Total: 13,831 dunams (13.831 km^{2}; 5.340 sq mi)

Population (1945)
  - Total: 970
- Cause(s) of depopulation: Fear of being caught up in the fighting
- Current Localities: Ein Tzurim, Shafir, Zrahia, Nir Banim

Al-Sawafir al-Sharqiyya (Arabic: السوافير الشرقية) was a Palestinian Arab village in the Gaza Subdistrict. It was depopulated during the 1948 War on May 18, 1948, during the second stage of Operation Barak. The village was located 32 km northeast of Gaza. It is one of three namesake villages, alongside Al-Sawafir al-Gharbiyya and Al-Sawafir al-Shamaliyya.

== History ==
Remains from the late Roman (third–fourth centuries CE), Byzantine (fifth–beginning of seventh centuries CE), and Abbasid eras have been found here. Columns and fragments were noted near the well.

12 century Crusader church endowments and land deeds mention Latin settlement in Zeophir/al-Sawāfīr. However, it is not clear which village of three Sawafirs these records pertain to.

=== Ottoman era ===
Al-Sawafir al-Sharqiyya was like the rest of Palestine, incorporated into the Ottoman Empire in 1517, and in the census of 1596, the village appeared as Sawafir as-Sarqi under the administration of the nahiya of Gaza, part of the Liwa of Gaza. The place was noted as hali, that is empty, but taxes were paid on wheat, barley, summer crops, vineyards, fruit trees and cotton; a total of 9,000 akçe.

In 1838 the three Sawafir villages were noted located in the Gaza district. The western village (=Al-Sawafir al-Gharbiyya) was noted as "in ruins or deserted", while the two others were noted as being Muslim.

In 1863 Victor Guérin found it to be the largest of the three Sawafir villages.

In 1882 the PEF's Survey of Western Palestine described it as one of three Suafir adobe villages. Each had small gardens and wells.

=== British Mandate era ===
According to the 1922 census of Palestine conducted by the British Mandate authorities, Al-Sawafir al-Sharqiyya had a population of 588 inhabitants, all Muslims, increasing in the 1931 census to an all-Muslim population of 787 in 148 houses.

In the 1945 statistics, it had a population of 970 Muslims, with a total of 13,831 dunams of land. Of this, 585 dunams were for citrus and bananas, 386 for plantations or irrigable land, 11,821 dunums were for cereals, while 40 dunams were classified as built-up, urban land.

The village shared a school with the other two Sawafir villages, and it had an enrollment of about 280 in 1945. The village had its own mosque.

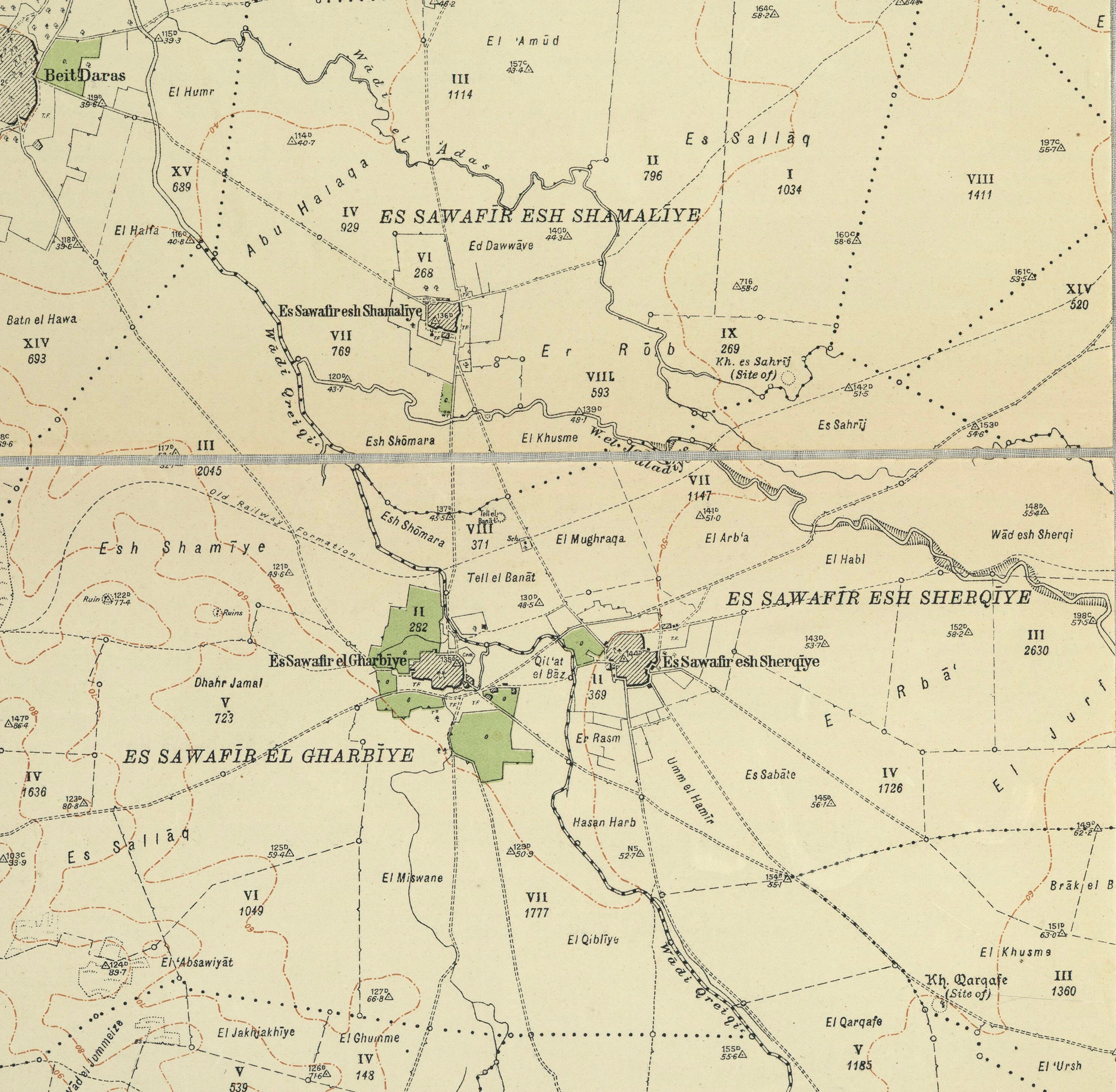
Al-Sawafir al-Sharqiyya 1930 1:20,000

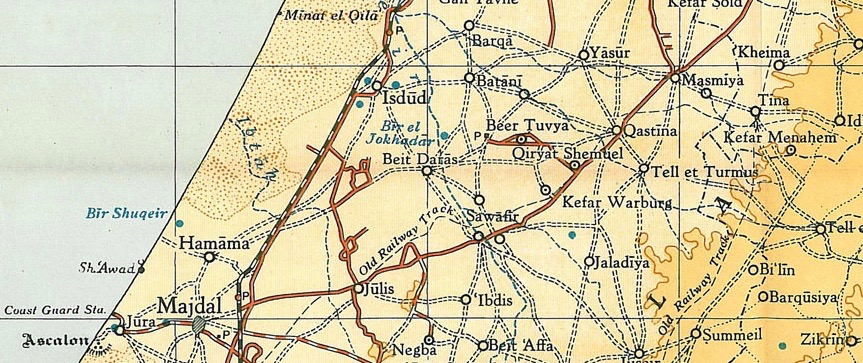
Sawafir 1945 1:250,000

=== 1948 War and aftermath ===
In early May 1948, the inhabitants of the three Al-Sawafir villages were ordered not to flee by the Al-Majdal National Committee. As of 23 May 1948, Israeli reports say that at all three Al-Sawafir villages the inhabitants slept in the fields at night, but returned to work in the villages by day. The village was destroyed as part of the Nakba, specifically as a result of Operation Barak.

In 1992 the village site was described like so: "No houses remain on the site. New buildings stand on the spot where the Mosque used to be. Some traces of the former village are still present on the surrounding lands, however. There is a building for a water-pump in Isma'il al-Sawafiri's orchard, an old sycamore tree in the al-Buhaysi family's orchard, and an old cypress tree in an otherwise vacant field."

== Bibliography ==
- Barron, J. B., ed. (1923). Palestine: Report and General Abstracts of the Census of 1922. Government of Palestine.
- Conder, C.R.; Kitchener, H. H. (1882). The Survey of Western Palestine: Memoirs of the Topography, Orography, Hydrography, and Archaeology. Vol. 2. London: Committee of the Palestine Exploration Fund.
- Dauphin, C. (1998). La Palestine byzantine, Peuplement et Populations. BAR International Series 726 (in French). Vol. III : Catalogue. Oxford: Archeopress. ISBN 0-860549-05-4.
- Department of Statistics (1945). Village Statistics, April, 1945. Government of Palestine.
- Guérin, V. (1869). Description Géographique Historique et Archéologique de la Palestine. Vol. 1: Judee, pt. 2. Paris, L'Imprimerie Imp.
- Hadawi, S. (1970). Village Statistics of 1945: A Classification of Land and Area ownership in Palestine. Palestine Liberation Organization Research Centre. Archived from the original on 2018-12-08.
- Hütteroth, W.-D.; Abdulfattah, K. (1977). Historical Geography of Palestine, Transjordan and Southern Syria in the Late 16th Century. Erlanger Geographische Arbeiten, Sonderband 5. Erlangen, Germany: Vorstand der Fränkischen Geographischen Gesellschaft. ISBN 3-920405-41-2.
- Khalidi, W. (1992). All That Remains: The Palestinian Villages Occupied and Depopulated by Israel in 1948. Washington D.C.: Institute for Palestine Studies. ISBN 0-88728-224-5.
- Mills, E., ed. (1932). Census of Palestine 1931. Population of Villages, Towns and Administrative Areas. Jerusalem: Government of Palestine.
- Morris, B. (2004). The Birth of the Palestinian Refugee Problem Revisited. Cambridge University Press. ISBN 978-0-521-00967-6.
- Nasser, G.A. (1955/1973): "Memoirs" in Journal of Palestine Studies
  - " “Memoirs of the First Palestine War” in 2, no. 2 (Win. 73): 3-32, pdf-file, downloadable
- Palmer, E. H. (1881). The Survey of Western Palestine: Arabic and English Name Lists Collected During the Survey by Lieutenants Conder and Kitchener, R. E. Transliterated and Explained by E.H. Palmer. Committee of the Palestine Exploration Fund.
- Robinson, E.; Smith, E. (1841). Biblical Researches in Palestine, Mount Sinai and Arabia Petraea: A Journal of Travels in the year 1838. Vol. 2. Boston: Crocker & Brewster.
- Robinson, E.; Smith, E. (1841). Biblical Researches in Palestine, Mount Sinai and Arabia Petraea: A Journal of Travels in the year 1838. Vol. 3. Boston: Crocker & Brewster.
- Varga, Daniel (2009-08-05). "Es-Sawafir esh-Sharqiya (Shapira Center) Final Report". Hadashot Arkheologiyot – Excavations and Surveys in Israel (121). Israel Antiquities Authority. doi:10.69704/jhaesi.116.2004.1183. Archived from the original on 2012-08-26.
