= Kfar Etzion =

Israeli settlement in the West Bank

Kfar Etzion: כְּפַר עֶצְיוֹן (Hebrew)
- Israeli settlement in the West Bank
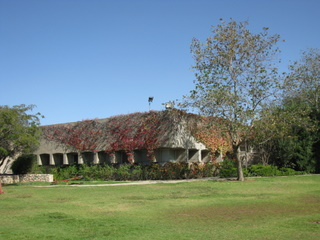

- Location within the Southern West Bank
- Coordinates: 31°38′56″N 35°6′55″E
- Country: Palestine
- District: Judea and Samaria Area
- Council: Gush Etzion
- Region: southern West Bank ("Judaea")
- Affiliation: Religious Kibbutz Movement
- Founded: 1927 (original); 1934, 1943, 1967 (re-establishments)
- Founder: Yemenite immigrants (1927); Hapoel HaMizrachi (1943)
- Population (2024): 1,209
- Website: k-etzion.co.il

Kfar Etzion (Hebrew: כְּפַר עֶצְיוֹן, lit. Etzion Village) is an Israeli settlement in the West Bank, organized as a religious kibbutz located in the Judean Hills between Jerusalem and Hebron in the southern West Bank, that has been through cycles of creation, destruction and re-creation. It is located 4.7 kilometres (2.9 mi) east of the Green Line and falls under the jurisdiction of Gush Etzion Regional Council. In 2024, Kfar Etzion had a population of 1,209.

Originally established as Migdal Eder in 1927 on land acquired by a group of Orthodox Jews from Jerusalem, it was depopulated and destroyed during the 1929 Palestine riots. Re-established in 1943, the Kfar Etzion massacre saw it depopulated and razed to the ground by Arab forces in 1948. It was re-established again in 1967 after the Six-Day War.

The majority of the international community considers Israeli settlements in the West Bank illegal under international law, but the Israeli government disputes this.

== History ==
=== Migdal Eder (1927–1929) ===
In January 1927, the Zikhron David society, a group of Orthodox Jews from the Mea Shearim neighborhood of Jerusalem, established a small farming community, Migdal Eder, on land near to the present site of Kfar Etzion. The name was taken from a verse in the Bible, Genesis 35:21, which referred to a tower of the same name. A group of 15 families, including 12 Yemenite families, settled on the land. In the fall of 1926, the society acquired 4,000 dunams (4.0 km^{2}; 1.5 sq mi) in the area, although it received official title deeds for 1,200 dunams (1.2 km^{2}; 0.46 sq mi). The farming outcomes were very disappointing and pleas for help from the Zionist Executive and the Palestine Jewish Colonization Association were rejected. After one year, only 7 families remained. At the outbreak of the 1929 Palestine riots, the remaining settlers fled and local Arabs destroyed and burned the buildings. Residents of the neighboring Palestinian village of Beit Ummar sheltered the farmers, but they could not return to their land.

=== El haHar company (1933–1936) ===
The El haHar ("to the mountain") settlement company was founded by Shmuel Zvi Holzmann in 1933. Holzmann bought 5,000 dunams (5.0 km^{2}; 1.9 sq mi) of land, mostly from Migdal Eder, and leased land from a nearby Russian convent. The intention was to found three settlements: Kfar Etzion, Pri-Amal and Ya'ar Etzion. The name "Etzion" was a play on Holzmann's own name, as "Holz" means "wood" in German and Yiddish, while "etz (עץ)" means "wood" in Hebrew. However workers preparing the site left in 1936 due to the beginning of the Arab Revolt and harassment by local Arabs. Most of the structures built by Holtzman and his associates were destroyed by local Arab residents. Much of the land was purchased by the Jewish National Fund to keep it in Jewish hands.

=== Old Kfar Etzion (1943–1948) ===
In 1942, additional land in the area was purchased by the Jewish National Fund using workarounds, including property from a Benedictine monastery that was acquired after the monks who resided there had been interned by the British. Other land was acquired from Arabs (despite the 1939 White Paper's ban on land sales to Jews in the area). The site of Kfar Etzion was settled in 1943 by Kvutzat Avraham of the religious Hapoel HaMizrachi movement. During the next four years, three additional kibbutzim -- Ein Tzurim, Massu'ot Yitzhak and Revadim -- were founded in the area, creating what became known as the Etzion bloc. All of them were destroyed in the 1948 Arab–Israeli War, and the entire area came under Jordanian rule.

=== Massacre of 13-14 May 1948 ===
The kibbutzim held off the attacks for ten days until Kfar Etzion fell on 14 May 1948. In the fighting, 157 Jewish defenders died, including a number who were the subjects of the Kfar Etzion massacre, killed after surrendering. The other three kibbutzim surrendered through the Red Cross and 320–350 residents there were taken as Jordanian prisoners of war and held captives until their release nine months later. Homes, structures and farms on four of the kibbutzim were looted and destroyed after their capture.

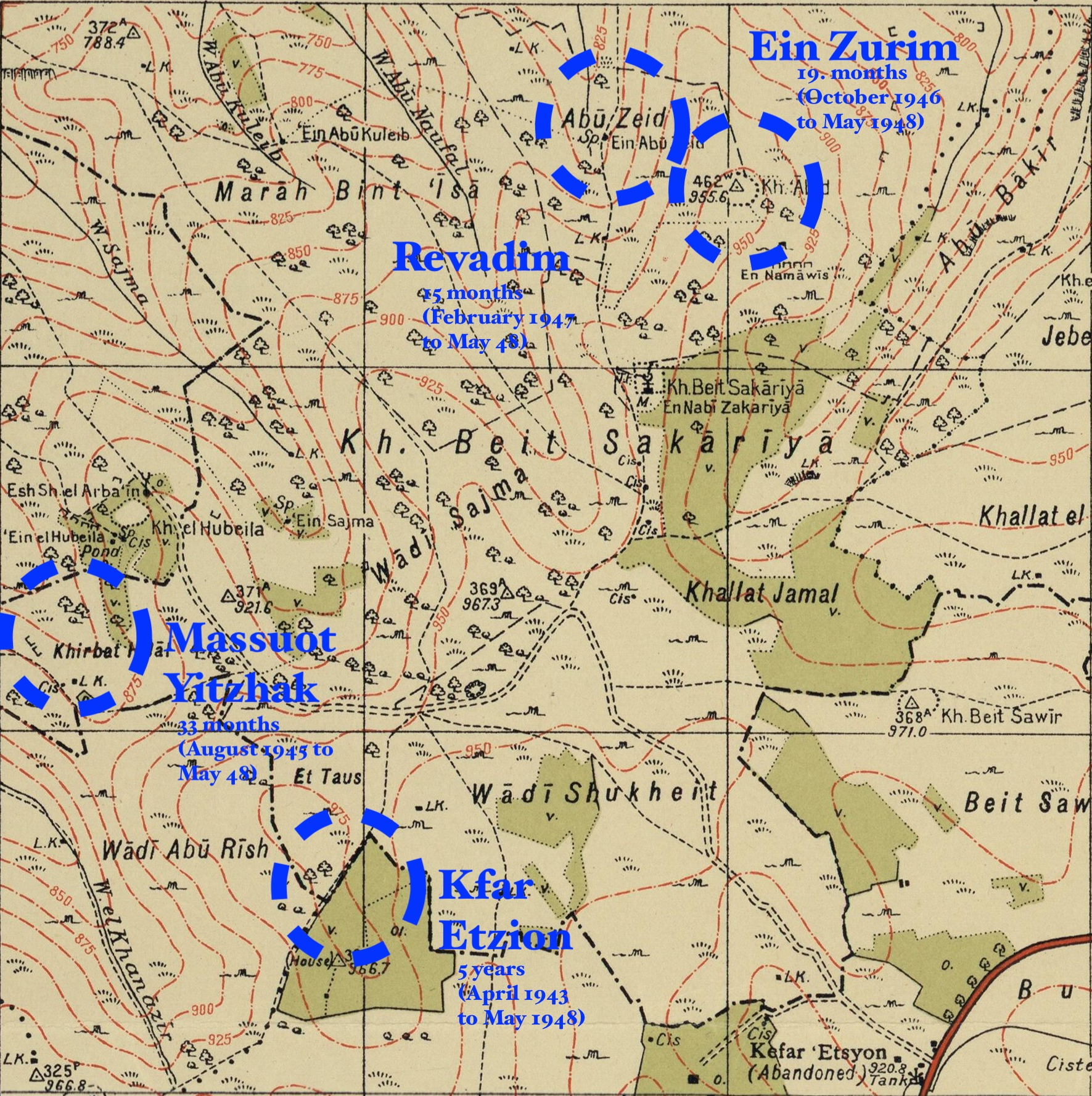
The four kibbutzes of the Gush Etzion -- Kfar Etzion (founded in 1943), Massu'ot Yitzhak (1945), Ein Tzurim (1946) and Revadim (1947) -- shown at the time of the 1948 war; overlaid on a 1943 Survey of Palestine map of the area

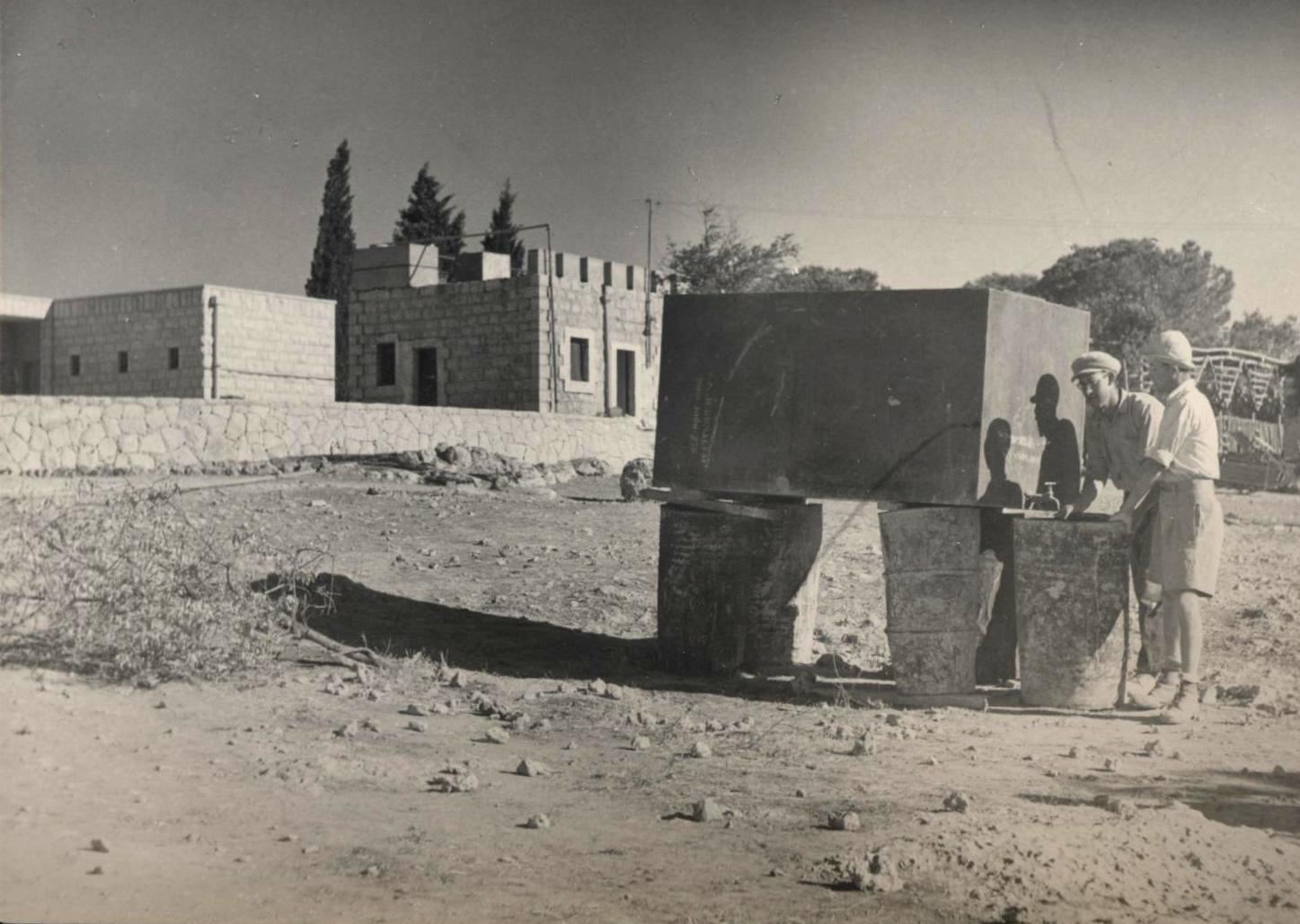
Kfar Etzion water tank, 1943

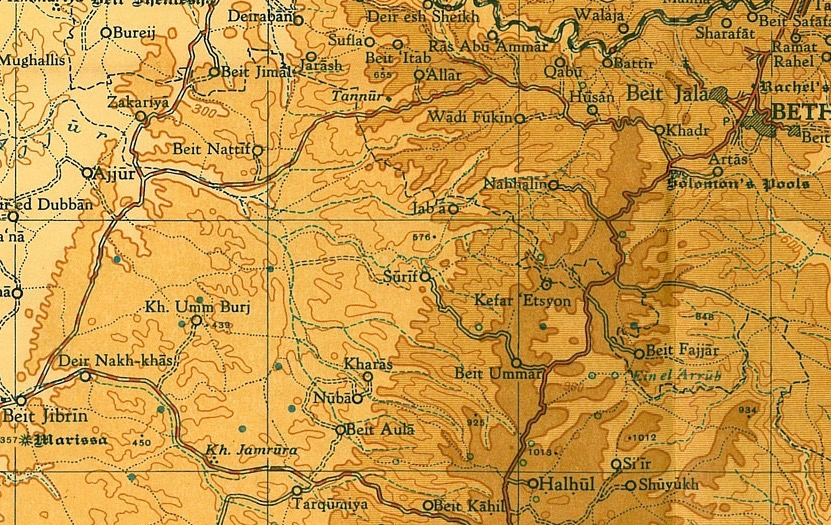
Kfar Etzion (Kefir 'Etsyon) 1945, 1:250,000

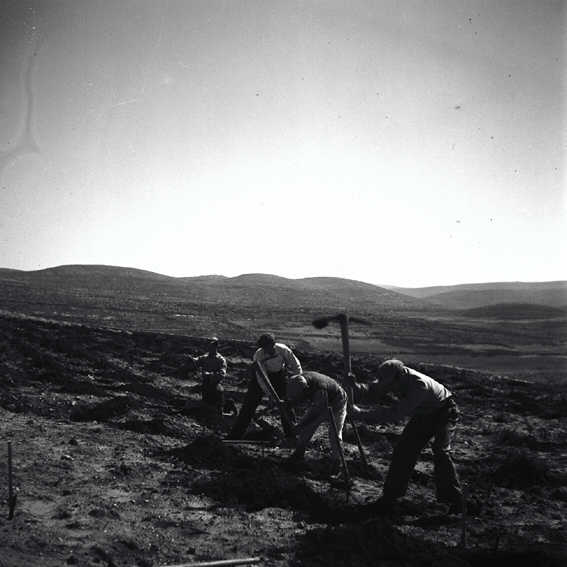
Kfar Etzion 1945

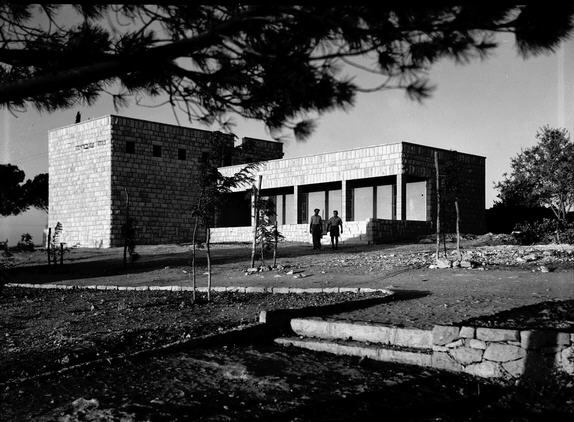
Neve Ovadia library exterior 1946

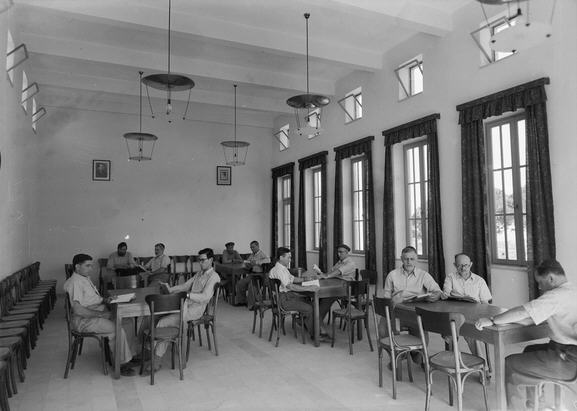
Kfar Neve Ovadia reading hall

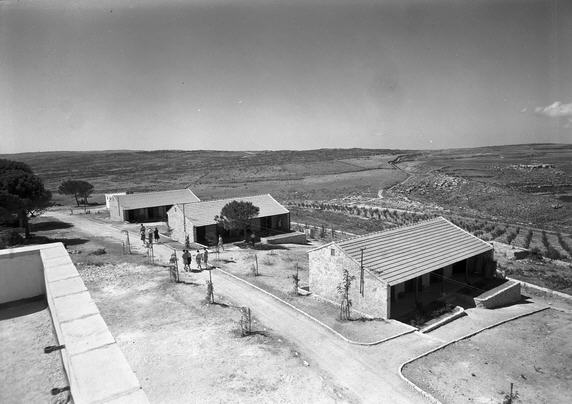
Kfar Etzion 1946

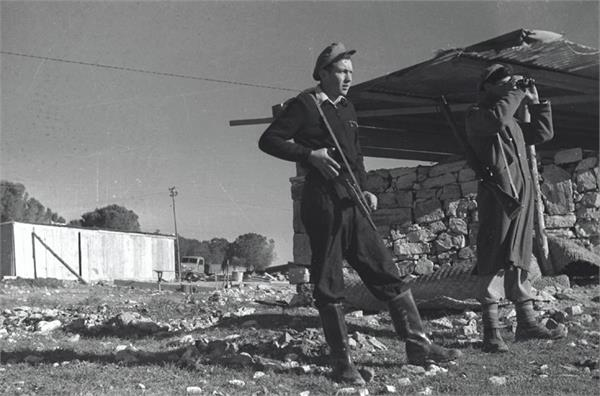
Kfar Etzion 1947

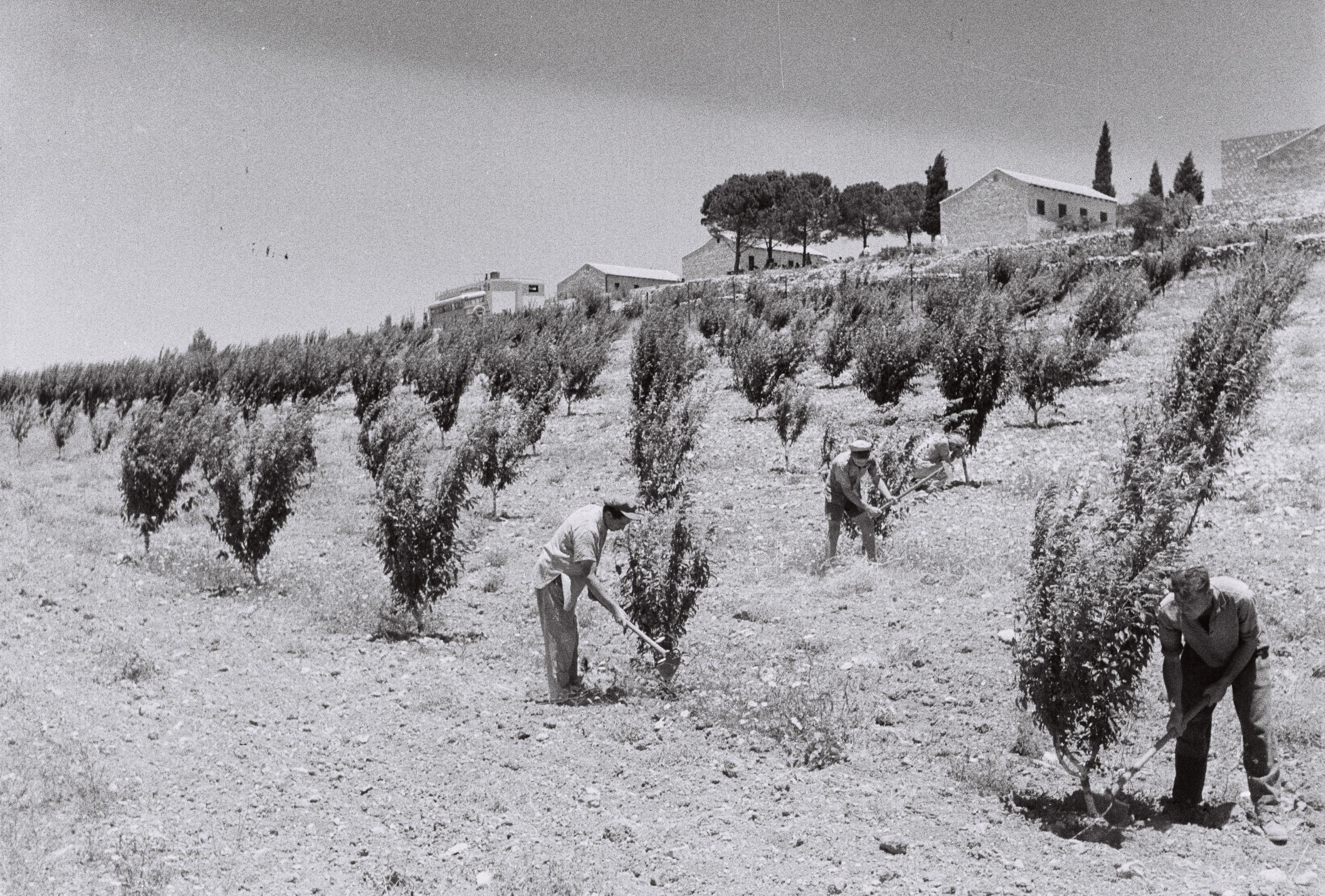
Kfar Etzion, 1947

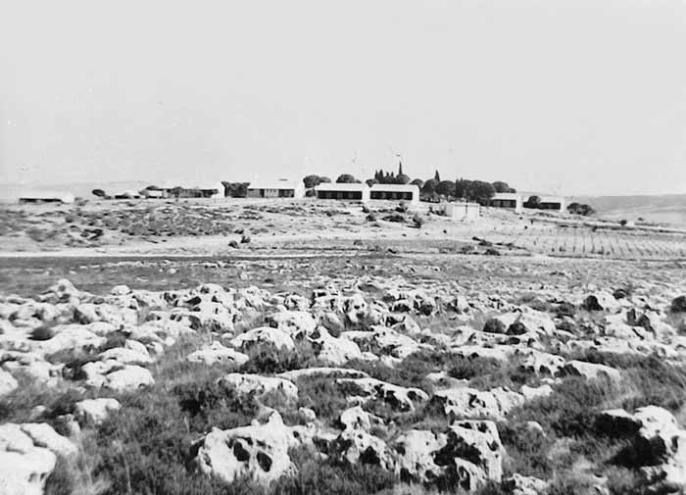
Kfar Etzion 1948

=== New Kfar Etzion (established 1967) ===
In 1967 Israel occupied the West Bank in the Six-Day War. The Israeli cabinet decided to re-establish the settlement of Kfar Etzion despite receiving legal advice that establishing such settlements in occupied territory would be illegal under the Fourth Geneva Convention. A key figure identified with Kfar Etzion's reestablishment after 1967 is Hanan Porat, who lived on the kibbutz as a child prior to its destruction in 1948.

Another figure involved in Kfar Etzion's resettlement is Elyashiv Knohl, a rabbi of the community whose father fought in the 1948 Arab–Israeli War and was captured during the war by the Jordanians. According to Knohl, Kfar Etzion's original settlers were socialists, and members of the kibbutz continue to channel their incomes to a joint account.

In the 2013 Middle East cold snap a meter of snow fell on the Kfar Etzion area.

== Museum and tourism ==
Kfar Etzion houses a museum and archive documenting the history of Gush Etzion, the Gush Etzion Heritage Center.

The kibbutz also houses: the Kfar Etzion Field School, which organises family trips in Gush Etzion and the wider area ("throughout Judea") and runs a bicycle rental; the "Shokoladshik" chocolate workshops; a dairy coffee house, a hummus restaurant and a café-restaurant.

== Economy ==
Residents of Kfar Etzion earn their livelihood growing cherries, flowers, olives, almonds, and grapes. Some raise chickens, and others work in Jerusalem. As of 2012 there was a large clothing store on the settlement. In 2012 the price of a 120-square-metre (1,300 sq ft) home on the settlement was ILS1.1 million while the price of a 200-square-metre (2,200 sq ft) home was ILS1.8 million.

== See also ==
- Lone Tree Brewery
