= Zrahia =

Zrahia: זרחיה (Hebrew)
- Location within Ashkelon region of Israel
- Coordinates: 31°40′55″N 34°44′43″E
- Country: Israel
- District: Southern
- Subdistrict: Ashkelon
- Council: Shafir
- Affiliation: Hapoel HaMizrachi
- Founded: 1950
- Founder: Iranian and Maghrebi immigrants
- Population (2024): 891

Zrahia (Hebrew: זְרַחְיָה) is a religious moshav in southern Israel. Located near Kiryat Malakhi, it falls under the jurisdiction of Shafir Regional Council. In 2024 it had a population of 891.

== History ==
The village was established in 1950, on the lands of the depopulated Palestinian village of al-Sawafir al-Sharqiyya. Most of the founders were immigrants from Iran, although there were also some from the Maghreb, particularly Morocco. It was named after Zrahia, an ancestor of Ezra (Ezra 7:4), who came to the Land of Israel after the Babylonian captivity.
