= Migdal Eder (biblical location) =

Biblical tower once standing near Bethlehem

Migdal Eder (Hebrew: מגדל־עדר Miḡdal ‘Êḏer [miɣ.dal‿ˈʕeð.ɛr], Tower of Eder, also "Edar") is a tower mentioned in the biblical book of Genesis 35:21, in the context of the death of Jacob's wife, Rachel. The biblical record locates it near the present-day city of Bethlehem.

So Rachel died, and she was buried on the way to Ephrath (that is, Bethlehem), and Jacob set up a pillar at her grave; it is the pillar of Rachel's tomb, which is there to this day. Israel [Jacob] journeyed on, and pitched his tent beyond the tower of Eder. (Gen 35:19-21 NRSV)

Many have attempted to identify the exact location of the tower, but early sources differ on the location. "Tower of Eder" could refer to a person called Eder or it may refer to sheep: a tower for viewing the flock.

== Connection to the birth of the Jewish Messiah ==
One scholar, Alfred Edersheim, interpreted Micah 4:8, the only other biblical reference to the tower, as a prophecy indicating that the Messiah would be revealed from the "tower of the flock" (Migdal Eder) which he claimed is connected with the town of Bethlehem, southeast of Jerusalem. However, this interpretation is not shared by most modern scholars. The parallelism of Hebrew poetry seems to point in another direction: "The appositional structure of the terms 'watchtower' and 'Zion' seems to negate the possibility that the 'watchtower of the flock' was a tower in the vicinity of Bethlehem (Genesis 35:19-21)." Instead, the thought is that this verse communicates an image of God watching over his people from Mount Zion as a shepherd watches over his flock:

[I]t shares the symbolism of the flock and I AM's kingship, but it advances the argument by predicting that Mount Zion, to which the flock has been regathered, will become a tower guaranteeing its security and survival as it did in David's epoch. The picture of the flock in 4:6-7A fades into that of the tower, Mount Zion, in 4:7A-8. From his watchtower a shepherd overlooked his flock and protected it against violent animals and vile thieves.

To support his view, Edersheim cited Mishnah Shekalim 7.4 and said it "leads to the conclusion, that the flocks, which pastured there, were destined for Temple-sacrifices, and, accordingly, that the shepherds, who watched over them, were not ordinary shepherds." Shekalim 7 is about how to deal with found items and, 7.4 reads:

An animal that was found between Jerusalem and Migdal Eder, or a similar distance in any direction, the males are [considered] burnt offerings. The females are [considered] peace offerings. Rabbi Yehuda says, those which are fitting as a Pesach offering are [considered] Pesach offerings if it is thirty days before the festival.

It referred to Migdal Eder as a distance marker to make a radius around Jerusalem, dictating how lost sheep within this radius could be used as offerings. It does not say that sheep were pastured at the tower.
