= Shafir =

Moshav in southern Israel

Shafir: שפיר (Hebrew); شفير (Arabic)
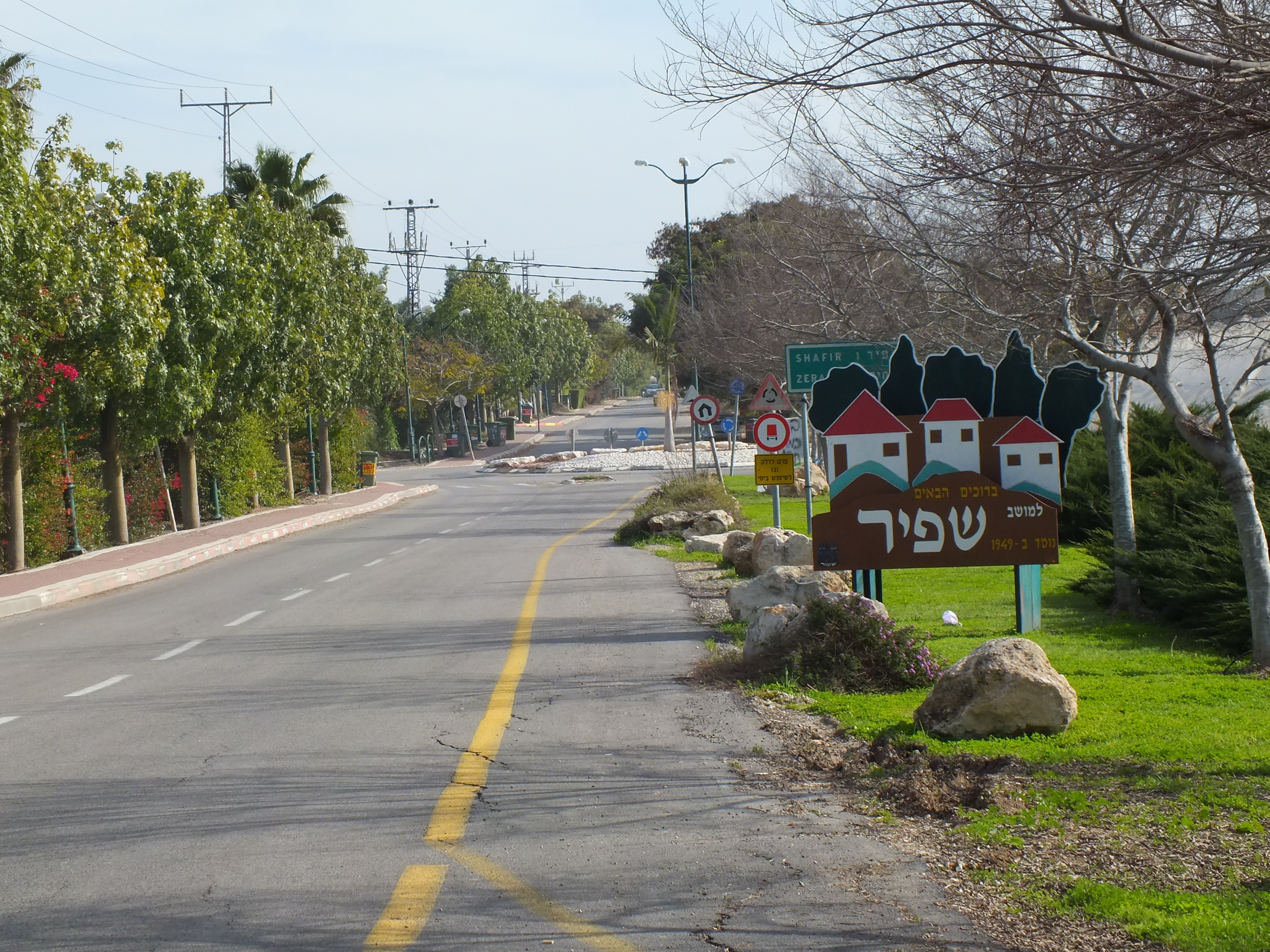
- Shafir

- Location within Ashkelon region of Israel
- Coordinates: 31°41′48″N 34°43′43″E
- Country: Israel
- District: Southern
- Subdistrict: Ashkelon
- Council: Shafir
- Affiliation: Hapoel HaMizrachi
- Founded: 15 August 1949
- Founder: Czechoslovak and Hungarian immigrants
- Population (2024): 1,074

Shafir (Hebrew: שָׁפִיר) is a moshav in southern Israel. Located in the Shephelah near Kiryat Malakhi, it falls under the jurisdiction of Shafir Regional Council. In 2024 it had a population of 1,074.

== History ==
Shafir was founded on 15 August 1949 by immigrants from Hungary and Czechoslovakia, and was built on the land of the former Palestinian village of al-Sawafir al-Sharqiyya, which had been depopulated during the 1948 Arab–Israeli War. It was named after the Biblical city of Shafir that is mentioned in the Book of Micah 1:11, which also means "good and beautiful". Today Shafir is made up of a Jewish settlers from Czechia, Slovakia, Hungary, and Iran.
