= Hebrew Free Burial Association =

American non-profit organization

Chebra Agudas Achim Chesed Shel Emeth Hebrew Free Burial Association, Inc.
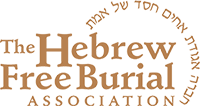
- Formation: January 25, 1889; 137 years ago
- Tax ID no.: 13-5596755
- Legal status: 501(c)(3) non-profit organization
- Headquarters: New York City, United States
- Executive Director: Avraham Groll
- President: Doron Bar-Levav
- Revenue: $4,177,698 (2022)
- Expenses: $2,567,419 (2022)
- Endowment: $1,639,178
- Employees: 13 (2022)
- Website: hebrewfreeburial.org

The Hebrew Free Burial Association (HFBA) is an American chevra kadisha (Jewish burial society) that provides free services to residents of Manhattan's Lower East Side. It was incorporated as a non-profit organization with the name of Chebra Agudas Achim Chesed Shel Emeth (The Society of the Brotherhood of True Charity) on January 25, 1889. As the need grew in adjacent Jewish communities, HFBA also grew to serve the broader metropolitan area of New York City. HFBA is currently the largest free burial society outside of Israel. In 1965, it changed its official name to Chebra Agudas Achim Chesed Shel Emeth Hebrew Free Burial Association, Inc.

== Overview ==
The primary function of HFBA is to provide free burials to all indigent Jews in New York City, regardless of denominational affiliation. Burials are conducted in accordance with Jewish law. If not for HFBA, an indigent person in New York City could be buried in a mass grave in Hart Island's Potter's Field after lying in a morgue for up to a month, or may be transferred to medical, dental, chiropractor, occupational therapy or physical therapy schools for dissection education and/or research. HFBA, through its many contacts with City and social service agencies, is notified about Jewish decedents and makes arrangements so that every Jew receives a funeral and burial that is prompt, dignified and in keeping with Jewish traditions. A project to place simple headstones on "unmarked" graves from long ago was begun in the 1990s.

== People buried ==
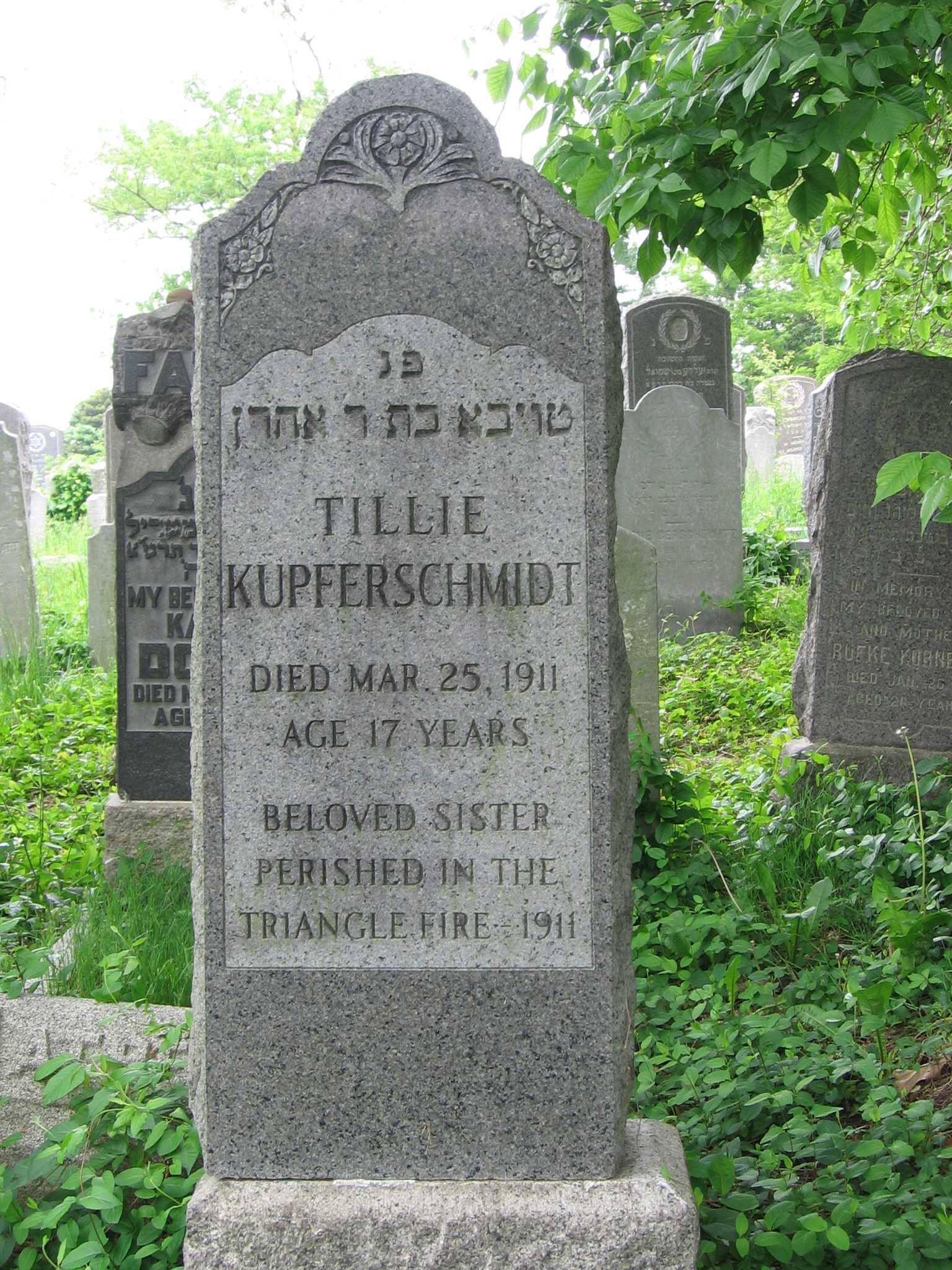
Tombstone of March 1911 Triangle Shirtwaist Factory fire victim at the Hebrew Free Burial Association's Mount Richmond Cemetery.

HFBA's clients have primarily come from among the impoverished, from the margins of society or from immigrant communities. Early in its history, they were victims of disease epidemics, occupationally hazardous conditions, poor medical care, lack of proper sanitary conditions, and high infant and mother mortality rates. In its annual report from 1900, HFBA's directors wrote, "What little they may have had quickly vanished for doctor's services and medicines, and even their belongings were pawned by them to obtain the wherewithal to save their loved one from the grim monster-death."

In the early years of the organization's existence, the majority of burials were of small children. In 1911, HFBA provided burials for 22 young victims of the Triangle Shirtwaist Factory fire. Others buried there died from the (1918) Spanish flu. Bodies were shipped from Manila during the Spanish–American War and at least one soldier's body arrived from New Guinea in the South Pacific during World War II. Large immigrant groups, such as Holocaust survivors and refugees from the former Soviet Union have also been prominently represented in HFBA's cemeteries, including Victor Ourin and Aaron Kuperstock, well-known Russian poets. Those who have needed HFBA's help over time have ranged from Mel Brooks' grandparents, and inmates from Rikers Island and Sing Sing prisons.

== Russian Jewish community ==
Over the last decade, many of HFBA's clients have been from the Russian Jewish community and were elderly or ill when they arrived in the United States. Experience has shown that although their Jewish identity may have been hidden or denied in the former Soviet Union, they, or their families, expressed the desire for a proper Jewish burial. HFBA's newsletter, Chesed, has an entire section written in Russian to make sure that this community feels embraced in life as well as in death.

On December 4, 2006, HFBA launched a Russian edition of their website, to further reach out to members of that community.

HFBA now employs a Russian Outreach Coordinator to improve its relationships with the Russian-Jewish Community. In an effort to improve such relationships, HFBA hosted a Russian-Jewish Community Event on February 22, 2009 featuring poetry readings and a silent art auction. At funerals and unveilings, those who are more comfortable publicly speaking in Russian to those assembled are encouraged to do so.

== Cemeteries ==
HFBA owns and operates two historic cemeteries on Staten Island, New York: Silver Lake Cemetery and Mount Richmond Cemetery.

Established in 1892, Silver Lake Cemetery was the first cemetery used by the HFBA to bury New York's indigent Jews. For the next seventeen years, close to 15,000 Jews from New York's Lower East Side were buried on this gently inclined hillside. Some days saw the interment of over a dozen individuals, mostly children.

Mount Richmond Cemetery was established in 1909, in response to the need for more graves for New York's indigent Jewish community. Currently, the Hebrew Free Burial Association buries approximately 400 Jews a year, and nearly 60,000 Jews have been buried since Mt. Richmond's inception. In 2011 there were 344 HFBA burials; by 2015 that had risen to nearly 400.

== Cemetery Clean-Up Project ==
HFBA manages a Cemetery Clean-Up Project, where groups come to Silver Lake Cemetery, and participate in its upkeep. Volunteers rake leaves and clear debris, demonstrating that the cemetery has not been forgotten, and that the Jewish Community realizes its obligation to its earlier generations.

The groups that have participated in the Cemetery Clean-Up Project are:

- Abraham Joshua Heschel School
- Adolph H. Schreiber Hebrew Academy of Rockland
- Areyvut
- Brooklyn College Hillel
- Brooklyn Heights Group of Synagogue Youth
- Congregation Beth Abraham (Bergenfield, NJ)
- Davetrek Adventures
- Davis Renov Stahler Yeshiva HS for Boys
- Frisch School
- Hebrew Academy of Nassau County
- Hebrew Academy of the Five Towns and Rockaway
- Jewish Community Center of Manhattan - Generation R
- Jewish Educational Center
- Ma'ayanot Yeshiva High School
- Manhattan Day School
- Marsha Stern Talmudical Academy
- Mount Sinai Jewish Center
- North Shore Hebrew Academy
- Oheb Shalom Congregation
- Rambam Mesivta
- Rav Teitz Mesivta Academy
- Rosenbaum Yeshiva of North Jersey
- Salanter Akiba Riverdale Academy
- SAR High School
- Shalhevet High School
- Shelter Rock Jewish Center
- SINAI Special Needs Institute
- Solomon Schechter School
- Solomon Schechter School of Westchester High School
- Stella K. Abraham High School for Girls
- Temple Emanu-El Mitzvah Corps.
- Torah Academy of Bergen County
- United States Military Academy
- Yavneh Academy (New Jersey)
- Yeshiva Derech HaTorah
- Yeshiva Har Torah
- Yeshiva University High School for Girls
- Yeshivah of Flatbush

== Corona burials ==
HFBA was working with "a refrigerated trailer big enough to hold 20." When a single day could involve 11 COVID-19 pandemic victims to bury, their old van, which could hold 4 bodies, was insufficient. Pre-Corona, a normal day was one or two burials.
