= American Mock Trial Invitational =

The American Mock Trial Invitational (AMTI) is a national mock trial competition for high schools in the United States, created and administered by the New Jersey State Bar Foundation and the North Carolina Advocates for Justice.

The competition was created in 2006 to provide an alternative for state champions with weekend religious obligations to compete on a national basis. The Torah Academy of Bergen County from Teaneck, New Jersey had won its state's 2005 competition, but faced difficulties in its ultimately successful effort to gain accommodations to participate in the National High School Mock Trial Championship in Charlotte, North Carolina without being required to compete during the Jewish Sabbath. While this competition continues to grow, it is still significantly smaller than the more established National High School Mock Trial Championship.

The inaugural event, in 2006, was held at the University of North Carolina at Chapel Hill on weekdays. Redlands High School of Redlands, California narrowly edged Middle Township High School from Middle Township, New Jersey by a score of 5-4 in the finals to win the event.

The 2007 competition took place at the New Jersey Law Center of Rutgers University at its Douglass/Cook campus in New Brunswick, New Jersey, on Wednesday, May 2, through Friday, May 4. The dates had been chosen to avoid conflicts with Saturday or Sunday religious observance, proms and Advanced Placement Program (AP) exams.

The 2007 American Mock Trial Invitational winners were a group of home-schooled students representing Family Christian Academy-Tennessee (FCA) from Chattanooga, Tennessee.

The 2008 AMTI winners represented David H. Hickman High School, a public high school in Columbia, Missouri.

The 2009 AMTI winners were Menlo School, a college preparatory school from Atherton, California.
