= Yavneh Academy (New Jersey) =

Location
- 155 North Farview Avenue, Paramus, New Jersey 07652; United States
- 40.930296°N 74.065143°W

Information
- Established: 1942
- NCES School ID: 02043348
- Principal: Rabbi Jonathan Knapp
- Faculty: 108.5 FTEs
- Grades: K – 8
- Enrollment: 786 (as of 2017–18, plus 60 in Pre-K)
- Student to teacher ratio: 7.2:1
- Colors: Red and white
- Team name: Redhawks
- Website: www.yavnehacademy.org

The Yavneh Academy is a Modern Orthodox Jewish day school located in Paramus, in Bergen County, New Jersey, United States. It educates students from pre-kindergarten through eighth grade. The school's motto is "Stimulating the mind, Nourishing the soul." The school was originally established in Paterson, New Jersey.

As of the 2017–18 school year, the school had an enrollment of 786 students (plus 60 in PreK) and 108.5 classroom teachers (on an FTE basis), for a student–teacher ratio of 7.2:1. The school's student body was 100% White. Yavneh's graduating class of 2016 consisted of approximately 90 students.

Yavneh's principal is Rabbi Jonathan Knapp.

In 2006, the SINAI Special Needs Institute, an educational program for Jewish children and young adults with special needs, opened its first full-time Jewish elementary school program in Northern New Jersey at Yavneh Academy.

== History ==
Yavneh started in 1942 in Paterson, New Jersey, but has roots going back at least seventeen years earlier. Initially, it had a six-child kindergarten, with classes held in a local kosher delicatessen. Two years later, it moved to 11th Avenue and 25th Street. It shared its space with the Paterson Talmud Torah, an older, part-time school, that had graduated its first confirmation class in 1925. The two merged in 1950. A few years later, the combined institution bought the Griggs estate and built a new campus, which it started using for the 1954–1955 school year.

Yavneh used that campus until 1981, when it took over a five-acre school campus in Paramus. In 1986, the Paterson Public Schools district opened the Rosa L. Parks School of Fine and Performing Arts, a high school, on the Griggs campus.

One piece of the old Yavneh remains in Paterson. In 1971, the Jewish Federation of Northern New Jersey, successor to Paterson's Jewish Community Council, built low income housing for seniors across the street from the Yavneh Academy campus. The Yavneh Men's Club, forerunner of the school's parents' association, donated two if its Torah scrolls to the Federation Apartments for use in an on-site synagogue. That synagogue continues to function, using the same two Torahs, which were refurbished in 2016.

== Awards and recognition ==
Yavneh Academy has received awards including: winning the Stock Market Game in New Jersey for middle school students in 1995, 1996, 2001, 2005, 2006, 2008, 2009, 2012, and 2016. Additionally, for the town of Paramus’ 100th anniversary in 2022, Mayor Richard LaBarbiera visited to speak at the academy.

== Athletics ==
Yavneh Academy has a basketball team and a hockey team. The hockey team won the Yeshiva League 2006 floor hockey Championships beating SAR Academy, and were the runners-up in the 2007 league losing to SAR Academy, and making it to the championship game in 2008, against Moriah School of Englewood. The girls' basketball team won the 2003 championship, going undefeated. Now, they also have a girls' hockey team.

Yavneh's boys' hockey team beat Ramaz in the championship in 2012 by the final of 7–3.

In 2013–14, Yavneh's boys' basketball team finished with a 9–1 record in the regular season. Having secured home court advantage, Yavneh went on to beat Ramaz in the quarterfinals in a 58–44 victory and defeated Moriah 59–39 in the semifinals to make it to the championship game. They lost to the undefeated SAR Sting in the championship game.

In 2013–14, the boys' soccer team had an undefeated championship season in the first year of the middle school yeshiva soccer league.

== Chesed ==
In addition to hosting Chesed Fairs for its students, Yavneh Academy arranges Chesed outings for its students. One such example is Yavneh's participation in the Hebrew Free Burial Association's Cemetery Clean-Up Project (Pictures of Yavneh Students cleaning Silver Lake Cemetery). Another example is the JCC Sukkot program. Yavneh also participates actively in the Salute to Israel Parade on Manhattan's Fifth Avenue. Two years ago the theme that Yavneh was given was "Holidays Enlighten Our Lives", and the theme for last year was "60 Years of Patriotic Pride".

== Notable alumni ==
- Naftali Bennett (born 1972), Prime Minister of Israel went to Yavneh in 2nd and 3rd grade.
- Eitan Bernath (born 2002), social media/television personality and chef.
- David Remnick (born 1958), editor of The New Yorker.
- Adam Szubin, politician who has served as the Acting Secretary of the Treasury of the United States.
- Jeremy Dauber, Professor of Yiddish Language, Literature, and Culture in the Department of Germanic Languages at Columbia University.
- Matthew Hiltzik, lawyer and publicist, founder of Hiltzik Strategies, which represents high-profile organizations and individuals such as various politicians and Hollywood figures. Hiltzik, Dauber and Bennett were all members of the same class.
