= Jura Soyfer =

Austrian writer (1912–1939)

- Born: 8 December 1912; Kharkov, Russian Empire
- Died: 15 or 16 February 1939 (aged 26); Buchenwald concentration camp, Nazi Germany
- Burial place: Hebrew Free Burial Association's Mount Richmond Cemetery, Staten Island, New York City
- Occupations: Political journalist; cabaret writer
- Parents: Vladimir Soyfer (father); Lyubov Soyfer (mother)

Jura Soyfer (8 December 1912 – 15 or 16 February 1939) was an Austrian political journalist and cabaret writer.

== Life ==
Jura Soyfer was the son of the industrialist Vladimir Soyfer and his wife Lyubov. The well-to-do Jewish family employed French- and English-speaking governesses for Soyfer and his older sister Tamara.

In 1921, the family fled from the Bolshevist revolution and arrived in the town of Baden near Vienna. They later moved to Vienna. At the age of 15, Soyfer began studying socialist writings and became a staunch Marxist. In 1927, he joined the Verband der Sozialistischen Mittelschüler (the Association of Socialist Mittelschule pupils). His early experience with languages meant that Soyfer soon developed a feeling and love for language and wordplay. In 1929, this led to his becoming a member of the Politischen Kabarett der Sozialdemokraten (Political Cabaret of the Social Democrats) where he gained his first experience in writing for the stage.

From December 1931, Soyfer wrote two weekly political satires, one in the Arbeiter-Zeitung (Workers' Newspaper) and the other in the social-democratic weekly Der Kuckuck (The Cuckoo). He also wrote two articles for the Politische Bühne (Political Stage, a socialist newspaper connected to the Red Players group of actors). These demanded that theatre become more politicised, and that it should stop producing mere distraction and entertainment. In this respect Soyfer approaches Bertolt Brecht's "epic theatre".

Soyfer also satirised the key authoritarian figures of the Austrofascist (1933/4 to 1938) period like Engelbert Dollfuß, Ernst Rüdiger Starhemberg and Kurt Schuschnigg.

In August 1935, through the writer and theatre critic Hans Weigel, Soyfer was introduced to Leon Askin, an actor and director at Vienna's popular "ABC Theatre", a political cabaret. This is where most of Soyfer's pieces were later performed.

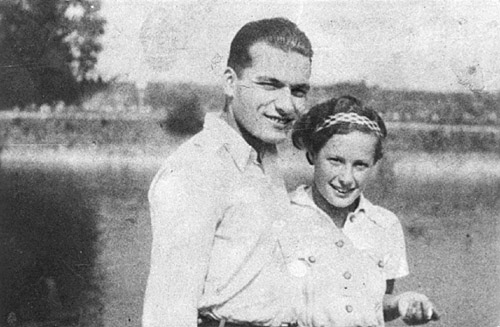
Jura Soyfer und Marika (Maria) Szécsi

In 1937, Soyfer was mistaken for Franz Marek (a leader of the Communist Party of Austria) and arrested. When it was discovered that Soyfer himself had also written incriminatory pieces, he was imprisoned for three months. On 17 February 1938, he was freed as part of an amnesty for political prisoners. He remained freed for only 26 days. On 13 March 1938, he was arrested as he tried to cross the Austrian border at St. Antonien Joch above Gargellen into Switzerland. He was later transported to Dachau concentration camp. Here, Soyfer met the composer Herbert Zipper, and together they wrote the famous Dachaulied, the Dachau song, which cynically took up the Nazi motto Arbeit macht frei ("work liberates"), written above the entrance to such camps.

In the autumn of that year, Soyfer was transferred to Buchenwald concentration camp where he died of typhoid fever the day after his release was granted, on 16 February 1939 at age 26.

His remains were sent to the United States and are buried at the Hebrew Free Burial Association's Mount Richmond Cemetery in Staten Island, New York City, per his family's request.

== Works ==
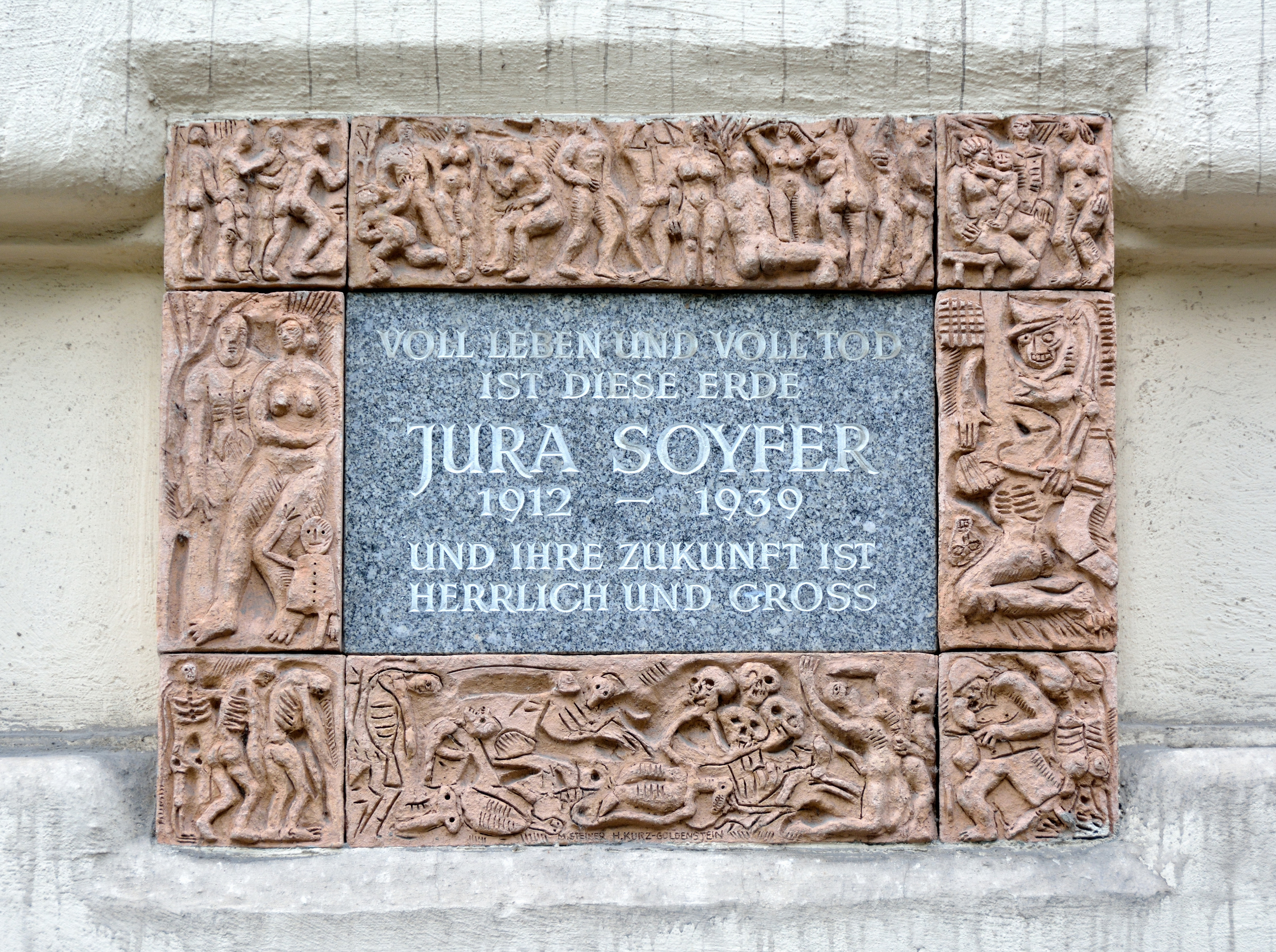
Plaque at his last residence, Heinestraße 4, 2nd district of Vienna

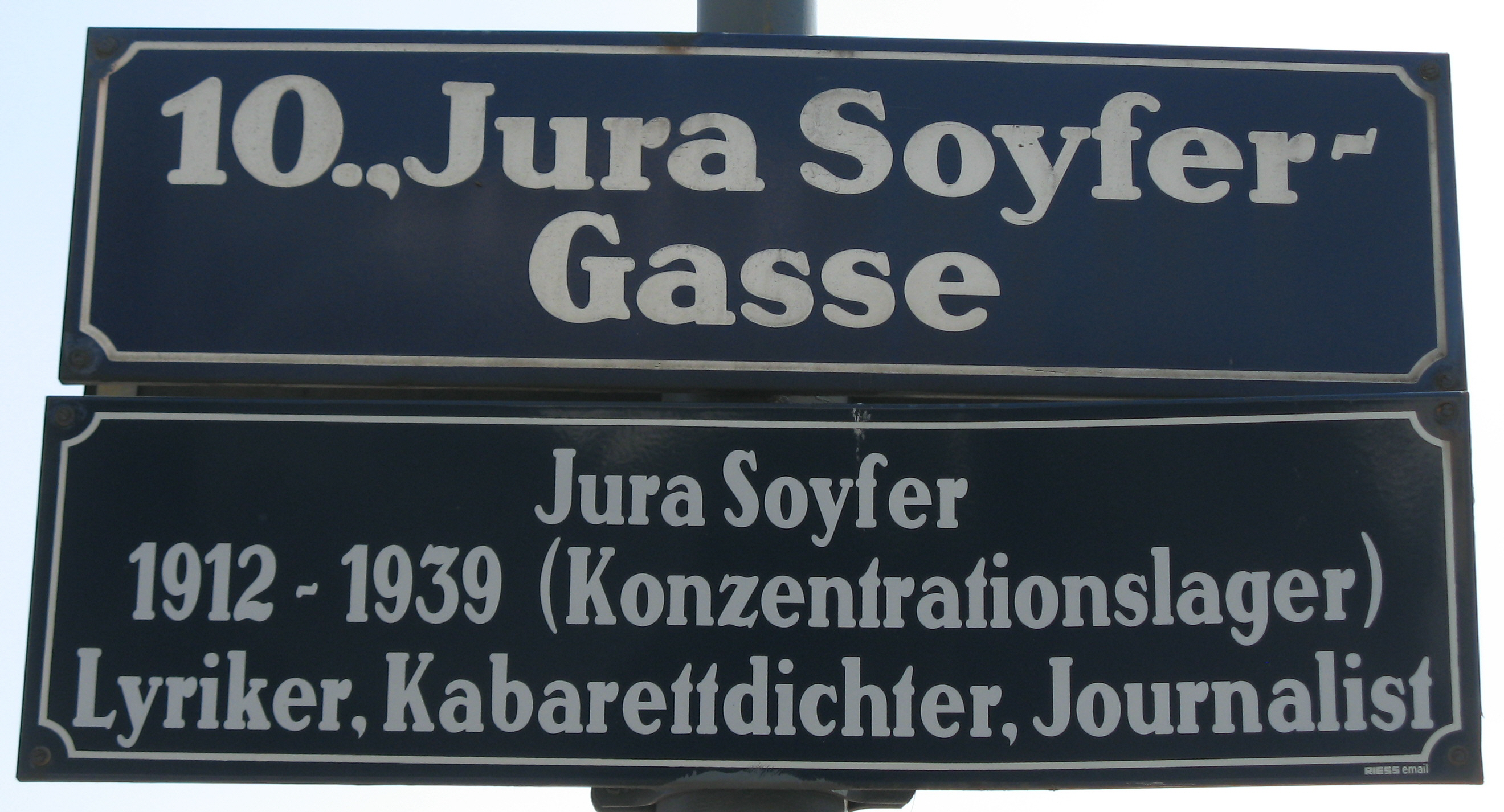
"Jura-Soyfer-Gasse", Per-Albin-Hansson-Siedlung Ost, Wien-Favoriten

Soyfer's first work, Der Weltuntergang oder Die Welt steht auf kein' Fall mehr lang ("The End of the World", or "The world is certainly not going to last much longer") was first performed in the early summer of 1936; the last performance took place only a short time later on 11 July 1936. It shows humanity before the Apocalypse, the destruction of the world by a comet – the violent repression of the revolutionary masses and the blindness of the people waiting for the end of the world. In the end, the comet does not find the heart to destroy the world, which gives the play a positive ending, but also underlines the frustrating incorrigibility and stupidity of human beings.

His second work, Der Lechner Edi schaut ins Paradies (translated into English as "Journey to Paradise") depicts an unemployed person who sets off to find those guilty for his distress in the past, with the help of a time machine. Eventually he discovers that the cause for his condition is the creation of humanity. The play ends, however, with a call to people to make decisions, including political ones. In this way, Soyfer connects pathos with the typical element of cabaret, political criticism.

Soyfer's third play is Astoria, a reaction to the problematic use of the word Vaterland which had been discussed in Austria since 1918. "Astoria" is a non-existent land which is the focus of the hopes and aspirations of the characters in the play. Their utopic dreams are constantly destroyed by reality. This point is made clearly at the end of the play by a song of praise the actors sing about the country when they are actually being sent to prison.

In 1937 Soyfer wrote Vineta. In this piece he leaves behind traditional Austrian theatre and portrays absurd actions and speech which lead irretrievably to downfall and destruction. The protest against facts which are seen as unchangeable, and the idea of "not wanting to know" are both themes of the play. Vineta is a warning against war and against illusions which are created to suppress people.

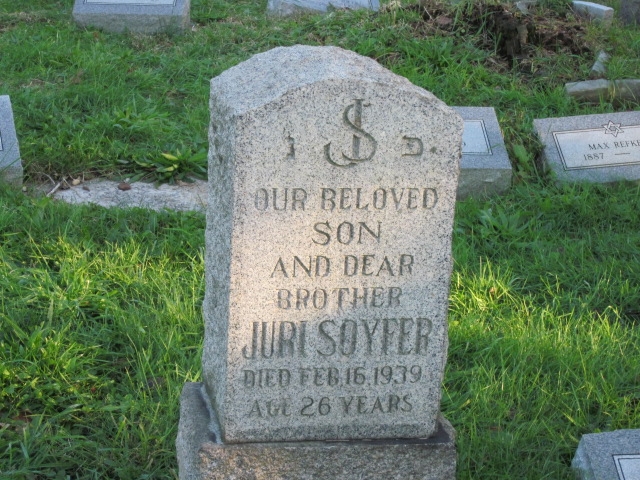
Jura Soyfer's gravesite at Hebrew Free Burial Association's Mount Richmond Cemetery

Soyfer also wrote Broadway Melodie 1942 for the "ABC Theatre". It is an adaptation of Columbus by Kurt Tucholsky and Walter Hasenclever. Soyfer kept the original satire of the clergy and court society, but his political criticism of society is far more radical. The way the play sees events from the point of view of the lower classes makes it a classic piece of Volkstheater Wien (Austrian popular theatre); it becomes clear that, in the imagination of the playwright, the lower classes of society are actually superior to the upper classes (or at least should be). Soyfer has been accused by the publisher of the "Columbus"-play, Felix Blochs Erben as well as by both widows, Mary Tucholsky and Edith Hasenclever, of having plagiarized the play from its original authors. In the end, the play was pulled from Vienna theatres.

During his imprisonment from 1937–1938, Soyfer began writing another play which was to be about Adolf Hitler. Nothing has survived of these drafts.

The first verse of the Dachaulied, the Dachau song:

Stacheldraht, mit Tod geladen,
ist um unsre Welt gespannt.
Drauf ein Himmel ohne Gnaden
sendet Frost und Sonnenbrand.
Fern von uns sind alle Freuden,
fern die Heimat, fern die Fraun,
wenn wir stumm zur Arbeit schreiten,
Tausende im Morgengraun.
Doch wir haben die Losung von Dachau gelernt
und wurden stahlhart dabei:
Sei ein Mann, Kamerad,
bleib ein Mensch, Kamerad,
mach ganze Arbeit, pack an, Kamerad,
denn Arbeit, Arbeit macht frei!

Barbed wire, loaded with death
is drawn around our world.
Above a sky without mercy
sends frost and sunburn.
Far from us are all joys,
far away our home, far away our wives,
when we march to work in silence
thousands of us at the break of day.
But we have learned the motto of Dachau
and it made us as hard as steel:
Be a man, mate,
stay a man, mate,
do a good job, get to it, mate,
for work, work makes you free!

== Resonance ==
Jura Soyfer's intent was not to present any complete solutions or conclusions: he believed that the problems he presented could only be solved in real life, in actual protest. His plays destroy illusions and call upon us to change society in its present form. He himself saw his own plays as a means for propaganda with a direct connection to the times in which he lived.

Soyfer's plays were published as a collection for the first time in 1974 thanks to the work of members of the organisation of exiled Austrians in England, "Young Austria". This took his works out of their original context and gave them a larger application: they were presented, for example, as timeless criticisms of the society of the communist GDR.

== Personal life ==
Until his death, Soyfer was engaged to 'Helli' (Helene) Ultmann, a first cousin of the famous stage mind reader and hypnotist Erik-Jan Hanussen (Hermann Steinschneider). Soyfer was survived by his parents, Wladimir and Lubow, his older sister, Tamara, and his girlfriend, Helene.

== See also ==
- List of Austrian writers
