= Hillel Fuld =

Israeli American tech marketer and vlogger/blogger

- הלל פולד
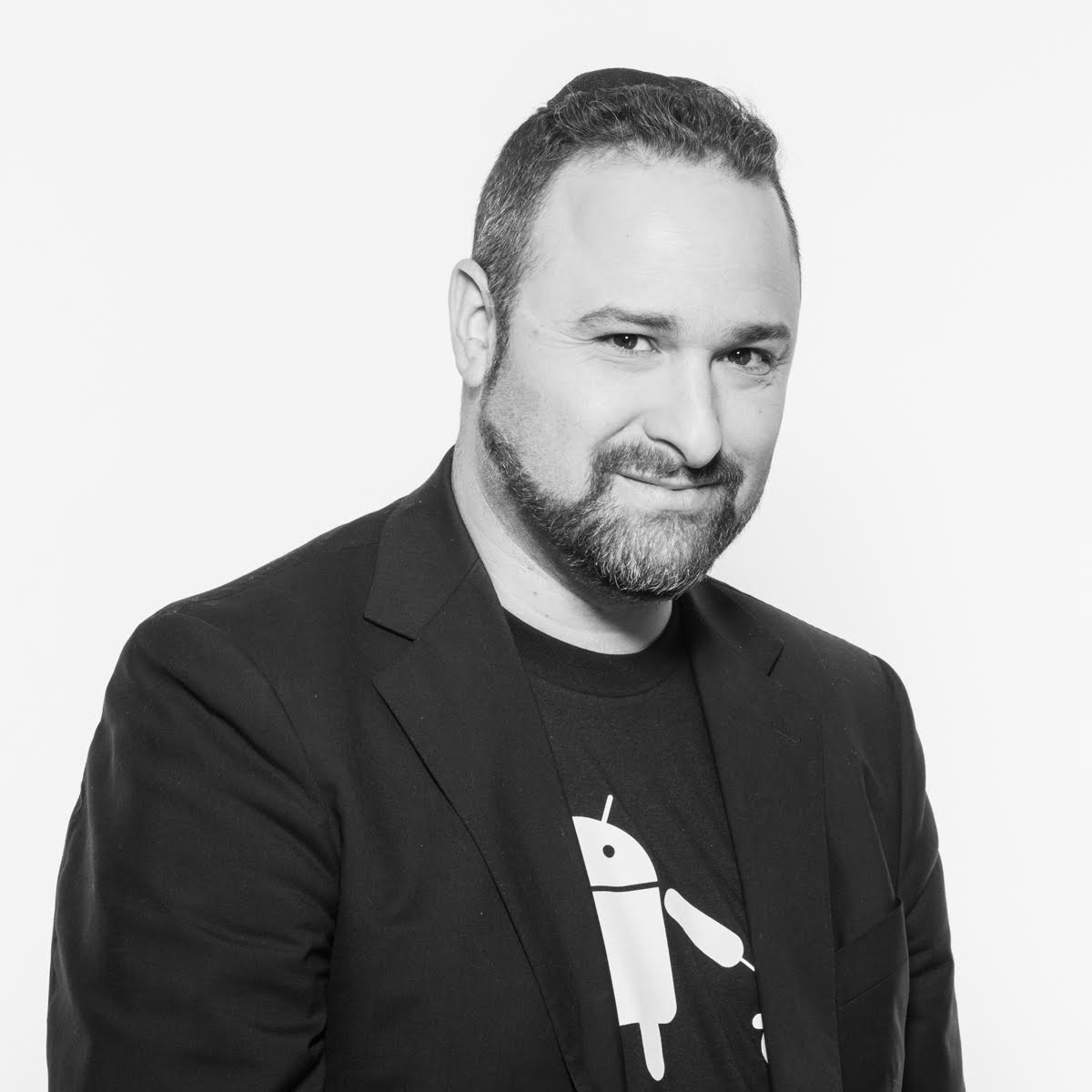
- Born: New York City
- Known for: Blogging
- Spouse: Racheli Fuld
- Children: 5
- Website: https://www.hillelfuld.com/

Hillel Fuld (Hebrew: הלל פולד) is an American Israeli technology business advisor, blogger, and vlogger. Fuld's work focuses on the Israeli high tech industry, guidance for startup companies, and marketing tips for growing a business or personal brands.

== Family and education ==
Hillel Fuld was born in New York City to an Orthodox Jewish family, where his father, Rabbi Yonah Fuld, served as principal of Salanter Akiba Riverdale Academy. As a teenager, Fuld moved with his family from the United States to Jerusalem, Israel. Fuld graduated with a BA in political science from Bar Ilan University in Tel Aviv. He served in the artillery in the Israel Defence Forces. He has spent his career in Israel's high tech industry. Fuld currently resides in Israel with his wife and their five children.

Fuld's older brother, Ari Fuld, was stabbed in the back and killed in September 2018 at the Gush Etzion Junction in the West Bank.

== Career ==
Fuld began blogging while he was working at Comverse Technology, a now defunct telecommunications company, as a technical writer.

Through his blog, Fuld has conducted interviews with influencers and public figures including Marc Andreessen, Gary Vaynerchuk, Guy Kawasaki, Alyssa Milano, and Steve Wozniak.

In June 2025, Fuld was barred from visiting Australia after his visa was revoked due to his "Islamophobic rhetoric", according to the Home Affairs Minister, Tony Burke. Fuld was supposed to speak at fundraising events in Sydney and Melbourne hosted by Magen David Adom.
