= 2005 Gush Etzion junction shooting =

Drive-by shooting in the West Bank

The 2005 Gush Etzion Junction shooting was a drive-by shooting attack on October 16, 2005, at the Gush Etzion Junction in Gush Etzion, in which three Israelis were killed and three others were injured.

The attack was carried out by a cell of Hamas militants called the "Hebron Cell", a group of militants from the city of Hebron who murdered six Israelis in various attacks in the area. The three cell members who carried out the murders were each sentenced to four life sentences, but were released in the Gilad Shalit prisoner exchange.

== Background ==
After the attack, Nitzan Alon, commander of the Etzion Brigade, stated: "There was no specific warning about an attack in Gush Etzion, but such an attack is relatively easy to carry out and we also estimated that such an attack was possible. Gush Etzion has been relatively quiet recently. There is no doubt that as we estimated, after the disengagement there is a transfer of the terrorist organizations from Gaza to Judea and Samaria, and this may be one of the signs."

About an hour after the Gush Etzion attack, a similar drive-by shooting attack occurred at the junction of the settlement of Eli in the West Bank. Militants shot at two teenagers walking by the side of the road from a passing vehicle. One of them was moderately-seriously wounded.

== Attack ==
On Sunday afternoon, October 16, 2005, around 4:00pm, a cell of Hamas militants from Hebron - Shkiv Bahr Shkiv Al-Aiwei, Mohammed Aschak Ali Al-Golani and Musa Ibrahim Fahd Wazwaz - arrived at the Gush Etzion Junction in a vehicle armed with an AK-47 rifle. The vehicle in which the cell members were traveling circled the traffic circle to survey the area. After completing the second round, the vehicle headed back towards Hebron, slowed down, and from a distance of just a few meters, the terrorists opened fire on the many civilians standing at the hitchhiking station heading towards Kiryat Arba and the settlements of southern Mount Hebron.

Due to the gunfire, Matat Rosenfeld-Adler, 21, an officer released from IDF intelligence who married an armored corps officer three months earlier, and Kinneret Mendel, 23, a teacher at the school in Alon Shvut, cousins who coincidentally met at the junction on their way home to the settlement of Carmel, were murdered. With them, teenager Oz Ben-Meir, a 15-year-old student at the Dimonah high school yeshiva in Ma'on, was also murdered. Three other civilians and soldiers were injured in the attack, one seriously and two moderately.

== Aftermath ==
The day after the attack, the victims were brought to rest. The cousins Matat Rosenfeld-Adler and Kinneret Mendel were buried in Jerusalem on the "Mount of Rest". Teenager Oz Ben-Meir was buried in the Sussia cemetery.

Immediately after the incident, the IDF began searching the village area around Hebron, in order to locate the gunmen and the vehicle from which the shooting took place. Roadblocks were set up and Palestinian roads near the incident area were closed. Among other things, the roads to the town of Beit Ummar and the Al-Arrub refugee camp were blocked. After the attack, one of the cell members called the offices of Al Jazeera and Al Arabiya TV networks and claimed responsibility for the attack, on behalf of Hamas.

=== Manhunt, capture and trial ===
The "Hebron Cell" included Shkiv Baher Shkiv Al-Aiwei, a 23-year-old clothes merchant; Musa Ibrahim Fahd Wazwaz, a 24-year-old store clerk; Qassem Farid Al-Aziz Jabar, 21, (who left it after a failed attack attempt); Luai Oweiwi, his cousin (who left the cell after the first attack); and Mohammed Aschak Ali Al-Golani, a 24-year-old construction worker from the village of Beit Kahil. The cell members first acquired an AK-47 rifle, ammunition and a vehicle which they used for attacks. Later they bought two more Carl Gustav submachine guns, and also replaced the vehicle used for attacks twice.

In April 2005, the militants tried to attack an IDF force in Hebron, but their weapon malfunctioned, the soldiers returned fire and the attempt failed. The first attack they carried out was on June 24, 2005, at a hitchhiking post at the exit from the settlement of Beit Hagai in southern Mount Hebron. In the attack, the teenagers Aviad Menzor and Avichai Levy were murdered, and three others were injured. In another attack they shot at a military jeep north of Hebron, but did not hit anyone. In another incident, they lightly wounded two soldiers in Hebron's Kasbah. A passing Palestinian pedestrian who was caught in the exchange of fire was killed. The next attack occurred at the Gush Etzion junction, in which Al-Aiwei, Fahd Wazwaz, and Al-Golani murdered three people. On December 16, 2005, cell members murdered Yossi Shok of Beit Hagai on Highway 60.

The manhunt for the cell lasted more than six months, and during that time, in December 2005, a new investigative team was established, in cooperation between the ISA and the IDF. The security forces assumed that this was a local organization, made up of family members from the Hebron area. The breakthrough was achieved on January 12, 2006, following the arrest of Shkiv Oweiwi by the Judea and Samaria Police District. During his interrogation, the entire cell was exposed. On January 20, the rest of the cell members were captured by fighters from the Duvdevan Unit, the Paratroopers Brigade and the Border Police undercover unit. Various cell supporters were also arrested.

In March 2006, an indictment was filed against the three cell members, who were accused of murdering six Jews in attacks in Beit Hagai, Gush Etzion and southern Mount Hebron, as well as the death of a Palestinian passerby in Hebron. In May 2006, their trial began. In March 2008, the Ofer Military Court sentenced four members of the cell to life imprisonment.

=== Terrorists' release ===
In October 2011, the cell members were released as part of the Shalit deal, after serving less than six years in prison. Ahead of the release of the murderers in the deal, the Mendel family filed a civil lawsuit against the three murderers of their daughter, in order to compel the justice system to keep the terrorists within Israel's borders.

== Reactions ==
=== Reactions in Israel ===
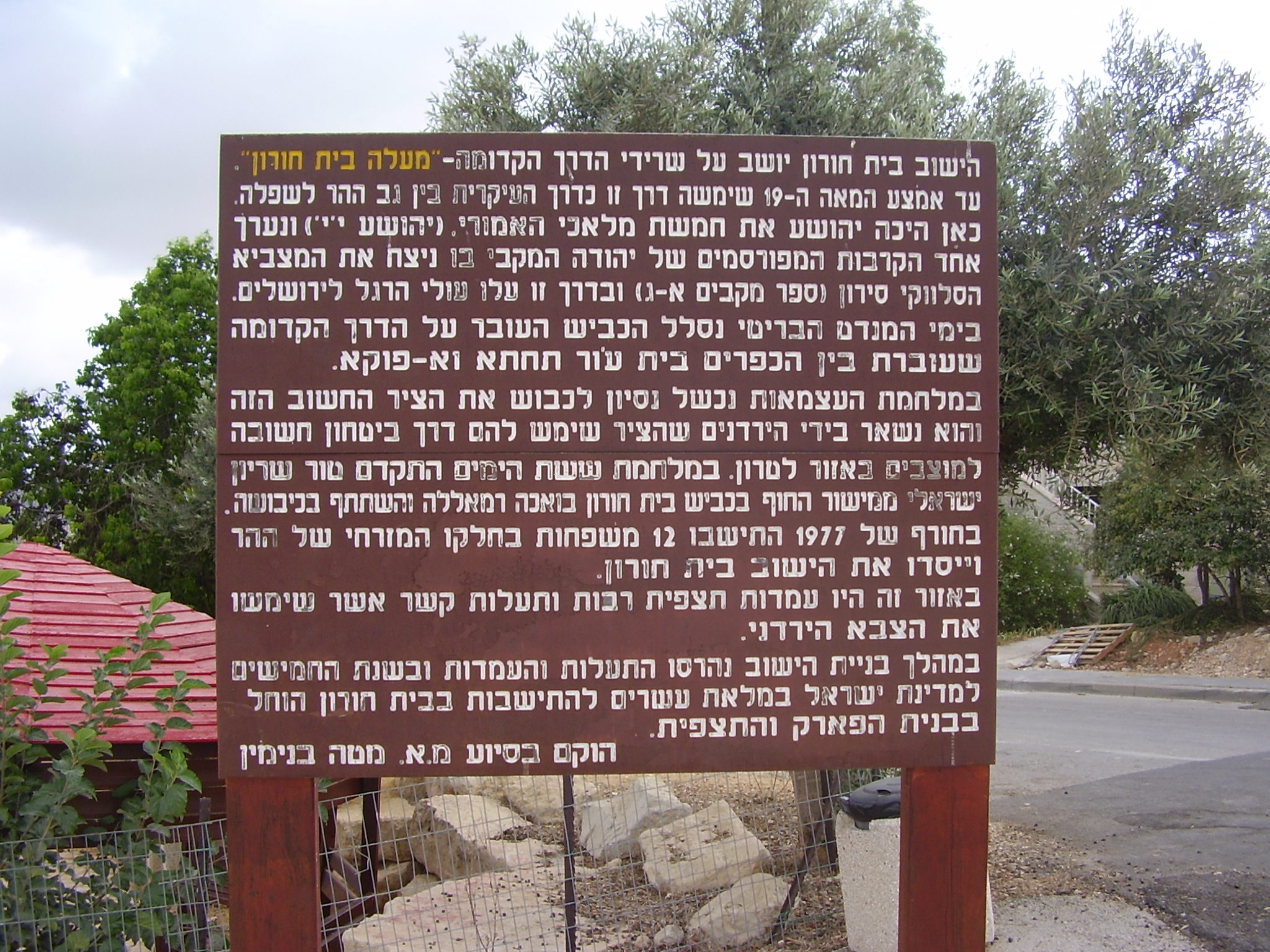
commemoration of Matat

Following the murders, the families of the victims and their friends worked to commemorate them.

- In Matat Rosenfeld's memory, a branch of Lindenbaum College was established in Karmiel which is active to this day and is called "Midrasha Matat". Two lookout points were also inaugurated in her memory, one in the community of Beit Horon where she grew up and one overlooking the Dead Sea in the community of Ma'ale Hever where she worked at the midrasha.
- In memory of Kinneret Mendel, the central synagogue "Shirat Kinneret" was built in Carmel where she grew up. A Torah scroll was placed in it to fill her soul. Lookout points were inaugurated in the moshav Carmel and on the shores of the Sea of Galilee.
- The Israeli singer Ovadiah Hamama wrote and composed a song called “An Eternal Rising Circle” in her memory, which was published as part of his album “Heaven and Earth”. In September 2007, the album reached gold record status, and brought Chamama the Ministry of Education and Culture’s award for Hebrew song for 2007 in the composer of the year category.
- Seven years after the attack, the Rosenfeld family established the “Matat Site” which assists religious girls in guidance for meaningful and efficient service in the IDF and national service, as well as guidance for midrashot and pre-military preparatory programs. The site operates on "wisdom of the crowds" technology and makes the experience of female servicewomen graduates accessible to girls enlisting for military or national service.
- The Israeli singer Udi Davidi wrote and composed the song “Carried on the Wind” in 2013 in memory of the teenager Oz Ben-Meir.

=== International reactions ===
Regarding the IDF's response to the attacks, the U.S. State Department issued a statement saying that "Israel should take steps to ease the daily hardship of Palestinians" while at the same time adding that "Israel has the right of self-defense against terror" and that the Palestinian side is committed to fighting terror.

== See also ==
- 2015 Gush Etzion Junction attack
- 2014 Alon Shvut stabbing attack
- Murder of Ari Fuld
