= Montgomery County High School (Kentucky) =

Location
- 724 Woodford Drive; Mount Sterling, KY 40353; United States
- 38.04465°N 83.94101°W

Information
- Type: Public
- School district: Montgomery County Public Schools
- Principal: Dr. Holly Lawson
- Teaching staff: 67.00 (FTE)
- Grades: 9-12
- Enrollment: 1,306 (2023–2024)
- Student to teacher ratio: 19.49
- Color
- Nickname: Indians
- Information: +1 (859) 497-8765
- Website: https://mchs.montgomery.kyschools.us/

Montgomery County High School is a public high school located in Mount Sterling, Kentucky, United States, serving grades 9–12. The school is the only high school within Montgomery County, Kentucky and the only one of the Montgomery County Public Schools school district. Enrollment in the 2022–2023 school year was 2,388 students. The student-to-teacher ratio is 17.9. 57% of the students qualify for free or reduced lunch.

== Mock Trial ==
Montgomery County High School has a nationally recognized mock trial program. The school won the 2022 National High School Mock Trial Championship. Since 2001 the team has placed in the top ten in the nation six times and finished in the top 20 twelve times. The team has also won sixteen Kentucky state titles, including, most recently, four Kentucky state titles in 2022, 2023, 2024, and 2026. The team finished 5th in the country this year at the national tournament in Des Moines, Iowa.

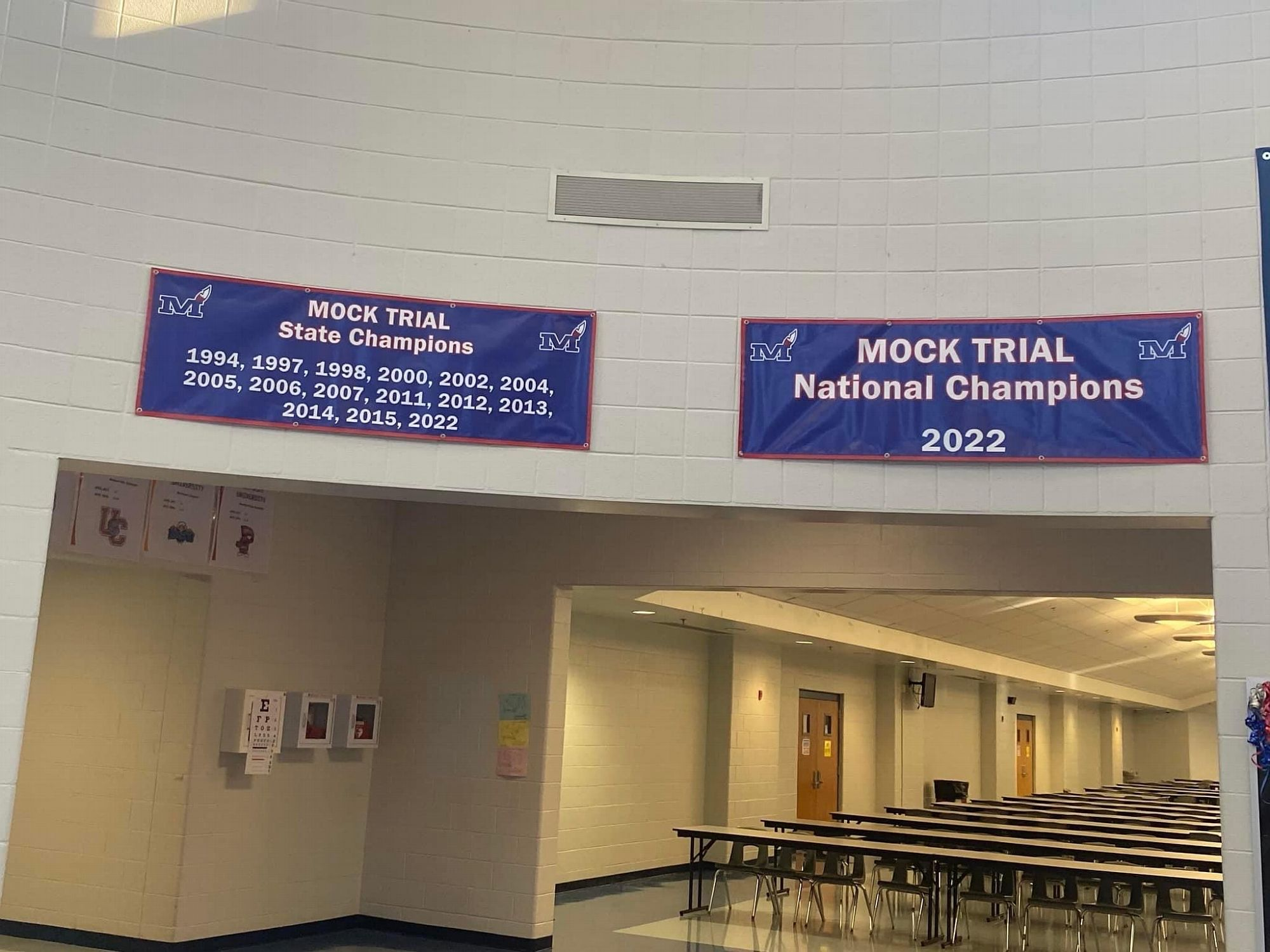
Mock Trial state and national championship banners located in the front lobby of Montgomery County High School
