= CardUP =

American digital fundraising software

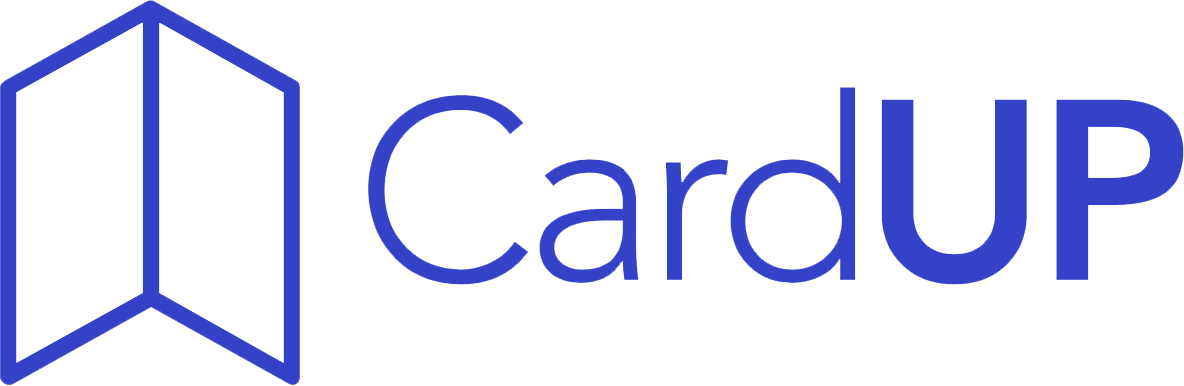
- Website type: Crowdfunding
- Available in: English
- Founded: March 2020
- Founders: Morgan Lazarus & Noah Schultz
- CEO: Noah Schultz
- Website: getcardup.com

CardUP is an American digital fundraising software for non-profit organizations. It was developed in response to the COVID-19 pandemic in the United States. The company was founded in March 2020 and is based in New York City.

== Conception ==
CardUP was founded in March 2020 by students at The Frisch School in Paramus, New Jersey (their high school was the first school in New Jersey to close as a result of the COVID-19 pandemic in that state).

== See also ==
- Crowdfunding
- Crowdsourcing
