= National High School Mock Trial Championship =

The National High School Mock Trial Championship is an American nationwide competition of high school mock trial teams. Hundreds, and even thousands of teams participate in district, regional, and state tournaments to select one champion team to represent each of the 50 states. The competition debuted in 1984 in Des Moines, Iowa, with teams representing Illinois, Iowa, Minnesota, Nebraska and Wisconsin.

Iowa has been the most successful state in the competition, setting a record in 2023 with its fifth national championship. Georgia and Tennessee have each earned the title four times, while Washington State has won the national championship three times. California, New Jersey, South Carolina, Indiana, New Mexico, Arizona, and Nebraska have all won twice.

== Winners ==
Past winners and runners-up of the competition include the following schools:

Year	Host city	Winner	Second place
1984	Des Moines, Iowa	Nebraska - Ogallala High School	Minnesota - Cloquet High School
1985	Lincoln, Nebraska	Texas - Richard King High School	unknown
1986	Phoenix, Arizona	Iowa - Lincoln High School	Wisconsin - Superior High School
1987	Washington, D.C.	Arizona - Xavier College Preparatory	Iowa - Marshalltown High School
1988	Dallas, Texas	South Carolina - Socastee High School	Texas - Westlake High School
1989	Louisville, Kentucky	Wisconsin - Rhinelander High School	California - John Marshall High School
1990	Portland, Oregon	Colorado - Evergreen High School	Ohio - Shaw High School
1991	New Orleans, Louisiana	New Jersey - Bergen Catholic High School	Texas - Richard King High School
1992	Madison, Wisconsin	Ohio - Shaw High School	Texas - Richard King High School
1993	Atlanta, Georgia	Mississippi - South Pike High School	Ohio - Shaw High School
1994	Chicago, Illinois	California - Arlington High School	Rhode Island - Classical High School
1995	Denver, Colorado	Georgia - South Gwinnett High School	Delaware - St. Mark's High School
1996	Pittsburgh, Pennsylvania	Michigan - Kalamazoo Central High School	Arizona - Deer Valley High School
1997	Nashville, Tennessee	Arizona - Deer Valley High School	Tennessee - Clinton High School, Tennessee
1998	Albuquerque, New Mexico	New Jersey - Cherry Hill High School East	Guam - Southern High School
1999	St. Louis, Missouri	Georgia - Clarke Central High School	Colorado - Regis Jesuit High School
2000	Columbia, South Carolina	Washington - Franklin High School	North Carolina - Asheboro High School
2001	Omaha, Nebraska	Iowa - Pocahontas High School	New Jersey - Montclair High School
2002	St. Paul, Minnesota	Tennessee - Family Christian Academy Homeschoolers	Pennsylvania - Quigley Catholic High School
2003	New Orleans, Louisiana	Tennessee - Family Christian Academy Homeschoolers	Colorado - Glenwood Springs High School
2004	Orlando, Florida	South Carolina - Bob Jones Academy	Wisconsin - Rhinelander High School
2005	Charlotte, North Carolina	California - Tamalpais High School	Hawaii - Kauai High School
2006	Oklahoma City, Oklahoma	Iowa - Valley High School	Michigan - Kalamazoo Central High School
2007	Dallas, Texas	Georgia - Jonesboro High School	Michigan - Kalamazoo Central High School
2008	Wilmington, Delaware	Georgia - Jonesboro High School	Michigan - Kalamazoo Central High School
2009	Atlanta, Georgia	Indiana - John Adams High School	Minnesota - Lakeville North High School
2010	Philadelphia, Pennsylvania	Minnesota - Breck School	Illinois - Hinsdale Central High School
2011	Phoenix, Arizona	Indiana - John Adams High School	Missouri - MICDS
2012	Albuquerque, New Mexico	New Mexico - Albuquerque Academy	Georgia - Henry W. Grady High School
2013	Indianapolis, Indiana	New Mexico - Albuquerque Academy	California - La Reina High School
2014	Madison, Wisconsin	Washington - Seattle Preparatory School	South Carolina - North Myrtle Beach High School
2015	Raleigh, North Carolina	Nebraska - Duchesne Academy	Georgia - Northview High School
2016	Boise, Idaho	Iowa - Marion Home School Assistance Program	Nebraska - Duchesne Academy
2017	Hartford, Connecticut	North Carolina - Central Carolina Homeschoolers	Michigan - Kalamazoo Central High School
2018	Reno, Nevada	Washington - Franklin High School	Minnesota - Nova Classical Academy
2019	Athens, Georgia	Tennessee - Agathos Classical School	Nebraska - Creighton Preparatory School
2021	Evansville, Indiana*	Maryland - The Park School of Baltimore	Iowa - Iowa City High School
2022	Kalamazoo, Michigan*	Kentucky - Montgomery County High School	Georgia - Northview High School
2023	Little Rock, Arkansas	Iowa - Ankeny High School	New Mexico - Albuquerque Academy
2024	Wilmington, Delaware	Pennsylvania - Abington Heights High School	Texas - Booker T. Washington High School
2025	Phoenix, Arizona	Tennessee - Montgomery Bell Academy	Washington - Seattle Preparatory School
2026	Des Moines, Iowa	Florida - Lakeland Christian School	Georgia - Northview High School
2027	St. Louis, Missouri	TBD	TBD
2028	Hershey, Pennsylvania	TBD	TBD

*The 2021 and 2022 NHSMTC were held virtually over Zoom because of the COVID-19 pandemic.

== Controversy ==
=== 2005 ===
The Torah Academy of Bergen County from Teaneck, New Jersey had won its state's 2005 competition, but faced difficulties in its ultimately successful effort to gain accommodations to participate in the National High School Mock Trial Championship in Charlotte, North Carolina without being required to compete during the Jewish Sabbath.

The American Mock Trial Invitational was created in 2006 by the New Jersey State Bar Foundation and the North Carolina Academy of Trial Lawyers as an alternative competition to address concerns of religious commitments by competing school teams.

=== 2009 ===
Maimonides School of Brookline, Massachusetts won the 2009 Massachusetts state championship and desired to participate in the national championship in Atlanta, Georgia. Due to religious dietary restrictions and Shabbat observance the school asked for accommodation in order to participate without violating their religious beliefs. The school asked for two trials to be changed from Saturday to Thursday or Friday in order to avoid violating Shabbat. In response the school obtained attorney Nathan Lewin to represent the school. Lewin filed a complaint with the US Department of Justice alleging religious discrimination and a violation of civil rights. Attorney Elizabeth Price resigned from the Georgia State Bar in protest over the National Board refusing to grant the requests for accommodation. The Anti-Defamation League sent a letter of protest to the National Board complaining against the lack of reasonable accommodation, asking the National Board not to punish children for their religious beliefs. The United States Congress condemned the National Board for failing to provide for these accommodations. On May 7, 2009, Fulton County Superior Court Chief Judge Doris Downs ruled that unless the competition would accommodate the Orthodox Jewish students, then the courthouse would not be allowed to be used for the competition.
