= Fernando Peña López =

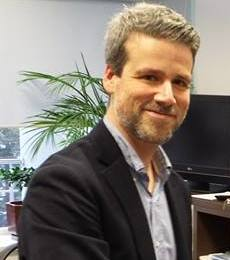
- Fernando Peña
- Citizenship: Spain
- Occupation: Lawyer

Academic background
- Education: University of A Coruña
- Thesis: Culpability in extra-contractual civil liability (2000)
- Doctoral advisor: José M. Pena López

Academic work
- Discipline: Civil law
- Sub-discipline: Civil liability, consumer law
- Institutions: University of A Coruña

Fernando Peña López is a Spanish lawyer and university professor specialized in civil law, and the current director of Fundación INADE-UDC Chair of risk management and insurance at Universidade da Coruña. He is an expert in civil liability, insurance law, and consumer law, and is author of publications in this field. He has worked as of Counsel for law firms and acted as am arbitrator of the Galician Arbitration Court. He earned a PhD from Universidade da Coruña in 2000 with a thesis on culpability in extracontractual civil liability, and furthered his studies at the universities of Roma-La Sapienza, Montpellier, Coimbra and Fordham.

== Academic achievements ==
As part of the activities of his Fundación INADE-UDC Chair of risk management and insurance at Universidade da Coruña, Peña introduced an innovative mock trial program known as Veredicto Ejemplar, which is already in its third edition.

== International affairs ==
Fernando Peña was director of the international relations office of Universidade da Coruña between 2012 and 2015, period in which he promoted the use of English as a medium of instruction, relations with multinational firms such as Inditex, and the creation of an International Summer School. He was also one of the coordinators of an EU-funded TEMPUS project on Reform of Education THru INternational Knowledge exchange (RETHINK), coordinated by the University of Lisbon, which allowed him to cooperate with universities in countries such as Armenia, Azerbaijan, Belarus, Georgia, Moldova, and Ukraine. In 2015 he engaged on a tour of Romania that allowed him to visit several universities and culminated with the signature of a double degree agreement with Valentin Popa, rector of the University of Suceava, who would later become minister of education of Romania.

== Publications ==
- Peña López, F. (2002). La culpabilidad en la responsabilidad civil extracontractual. Comares. (in Spanish). Editorial Comares. ISBN 978-84-8444-496-1.
- Busto Lago, J. M., Álvarez Lata, N., & Peña López, F. (2005). Reclamaciones de consumo: derecho de consumo desde la perspectiva del consumidor. Thomson/Aranzadi; Ministerio de Sanidad y Consumo: Instituto Nacional del Consumo.
- Álvarez Lata, N., Busto Lago, J. M., & Peña López, F. (Dir.) (2015). Curso de derecho civil de Galicia. Atelier.
- Peña López, F., & Carrasco Perera, A. (2018). La Responsabilidad civil por daños a la libre competencia : un análisis de las normas de derecho sustantivo contenidas en el Título VI de la Ley de defensa de la competencia, mediante las que se transpone la Directiva 2014/104/UE. Tirant lo Blanch.
- Busto Lago, J. M., ÁLvarez Lata, N., Peña López, F., & Collado-Rodriguez, N. (2020). Reclamaciones de consumo : materiales para la construcción de un Tratado de Derecho de consumo (4ª ed). Thomson Reuters Aranzadi.
