= Jeremy Frommer =

American financier and entrepreneur

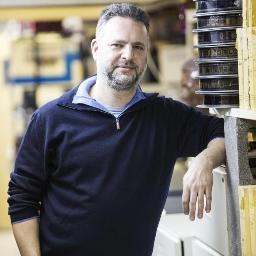
- CEO, Hedge Fund LIVE
- Born: New York, United States
- Education: University at Albany, SUNY (B.A.)
- Occupations: Hedge fund manager, entrepreneur
- Title: CEO, Jerrick Ventures Inc. (2011–present)

Jeremy Frommer is an American financier and entrepreneur based in New Jersey. His career includes over two decades on Wall Street, working as a hedge fund and portfolio manager, and on the sell-side of the financial industry, building and selling two financial services companies. He is CEO of Jerrick Ventures Inc., a company that acquires, develops and produces content across all forms of media. Frommer is depicted in Michael Lewis' book Flash Boys. In 2012, Frommer discovered the "Guccione Collection," a large collection of unpublished works and photos owned by Bob Guccione, the founder of the Penthouse empire.

== Early life and education ==
Frommer grew up on the East Coast and attended the Frisch School in Paramus, New Jersey. In 1987, Frommer worked as an intern in the equity division of Salomon Brothers Inc. He later graduated magna cum laude from the University at Albany, SUNY, with a B.A. in philosophy, and studied at the London School of Economics.

== Career ==
In 1990, Frommer began his professional career on the high yield bond and distressed debt desk at Kidder, Peabody & Co. He was recruited by Mark Patterson in 1993 to the proprietary distressed debt group at BT Securities (Bankers Trust), responsible for managing trading activities for the firm's distressed debt accounts. In 1995, Frommer joined Scott Keller at Guard Hill Capital, a merger arbitrage hedge fund founded by Keller. Frommer was a senior partner. In 1997, he left Guard Hill Capital and joined Royal Bank of Canada (RBC), where he worked for the then-head of global equity derivatives and then president/co-CEO of RBC Capital Markets, Mark Standish. In 2000, Frommer was hired by Bank of America, where he managed portfolios of distressed debt and merger arbitrage securities under the asset management of Jonathan Sandelman, who later founded Sandelman Partners.

In 2002, Frommer started NextGen Trading, a software development company building proprietary equity trading platforms. In 2002, NextGen became an affiliate of Carlin Financial Group (Carlin), which bought NextGen in 2004. Frommer became president and COO then CEO of the company. Carlin was acquired by RBC Capital Markets Corporation, on January 2, 2007, for an undisclosed amount.

At RBC, Frommer was managing director, head of the Global Prime Services group (GPS) and a member of the RBC Global Prime Equities Operating Committee. RBC's Global Prime Services incorporated the bank's global prime brokerage business and reflected the trend blurring the lines between traditional and hedge funds, increasing competition between prime brokers and custodian banks.

In 2012, Frommer acquired the creditors assets of the late media mogul Bob Guccione, publisher of Penthouse, Omni, Viva, Kathy Keeton's Longevity, and other periodicals. Frommer partnered with film producer Rick Schwartz to buy the entirety of the Guccione archives, including dozens of Guccione's paintings.
