= SAR High School =

Salanter Akiba of Riverdale High School
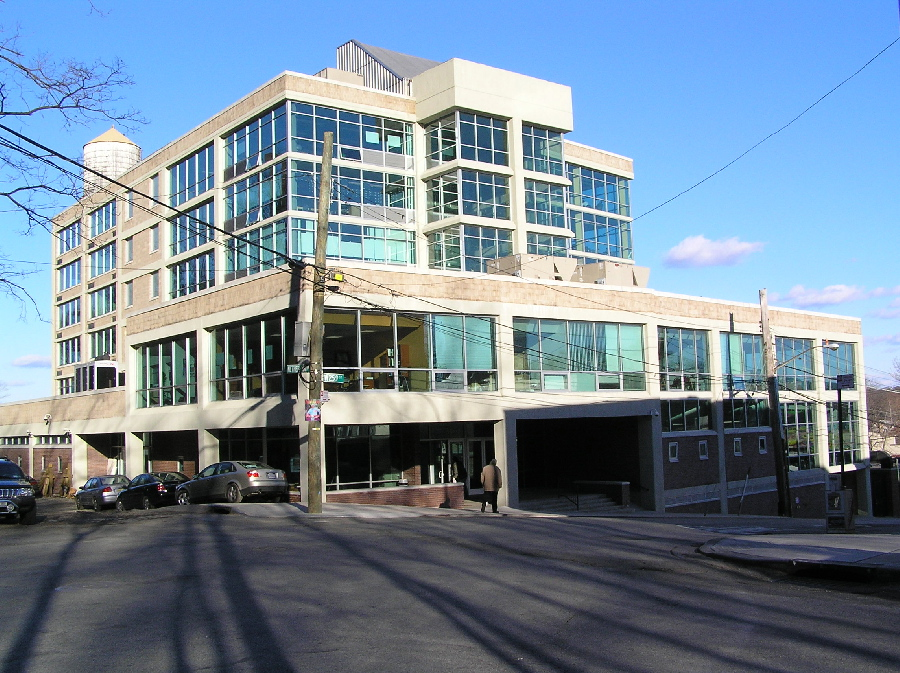

Location
- 503 West 259th Street; Bronx, New York 10471; United States; 40°54′26″N 73°54′16″W

Information
- Type: Private high school
- Motto: It's not just what you learn, it's who you become
- Established: 2003
- Locale: Residential area
- Principal: Rabbi Tully Harcsztark; Rabbi Jonathan Kroll
- Faculty: 117.0 FTEs
- Grades: 9-12
- Enrollment: 593 (as of 2019-2020)
- Student to teacher ratio: 4.6:1
- Colors: Black and yellow
- Team name: SAR Sting
- Newspaper: The Buzz
- Website: saracademy.org

Salanter Akiba Riverdale High School (SAR High School) is a Modern Orthodox Jewish day school located in the Riverdale section of The Bronx, New York. It was founded in 2003 by Rabbi Naftali (Tully) Harcsztark. The school is affiliated with SAR Academy, which is also in Riverdale.

The high school's founding principal and current dean is Rabbi Tully Harcsztark. In fall 2019, previous assistant principal Rabbi Jonathan Kroll, returned to the school to serve as its Co-Principal alongside Rabbi Tully Harcsztark and later assumed the role of principal when Rabbi Tully Harcsztark became dean.

As of the 2017–18 school year, the school had an enrollment of 539 students and 121.0 classroom teachers (on an FTE basis), for a student–teacher ratio of 4.45:1.

== Extracurricular activities ==
Students have the opportunity to contribute to a wide variety of publications including Ruach Searah, the Dvar Torah newsletter; 'SAR Broadcasting club' where students learn how to work cameras how to set up a broadcasting setup and broadcast games played at the school. The Buzz, the official school newspaper; Modern Affairs, the school's geopolitical and current events newspaper; The Science Journal; Math Mag, an award-winning publication; the literary journal, Euphrates; The Israel Activism Committee's HaOketz covering Israel current events; "House Divided", the first student-run publication dedicated to political and historical dialogue; SARcasm, the school satire magazine, and the Global Awareness and Action Committee's (GAAC) publication. Clubs include Model United Nations, Debate, Mock Trial, College Bowl, the Humanities Colloquium, and countless others. SAR also has many charity clubs, including the Cookies For A Cause Club, which has won multiple grants and awards, including the Optimum Charity Champions grant in 2015. In 2019, SAR's Economics Club won the National Championships in the Personal Finance Challenge, beating over 18,000 other students nationwide. SAR's College Bowl team was featured in the 2012–2013 season of MSG Varsity's the Challenge. They were the Bronx/Brooklyn champions but lost in the following round.

In February 2021, The EPG (elections, politics, and governance) club held a town hall for the New York City mayoral election. Several candidates, including Andrew Yang, Eric Adams, and Maya Wiley, were in attendance.

== Sports ==
All of SAR's teams are members of the Metropolitan Yeshiva High School Athletic League, which is composed of many of the Jewish day schools throughout the New York metropolitan area.

SAR teams compete in baseball, softball, hockey, soccer, Swim, volleyball, basketball, track, tennis, and wrestling.

== History ==
The Salanter Akiba Riverdale (SAR) Academy was founded in 1969 with the merger of the Salanter Yeshiva, Akiba Hebrew Academy, and the Riverdale Hebrew Day School. In 2003, SAR High School was established.

SAR High School is considered among the more liberal Modern Orthodox day schools in the United States. In 2013, the school granted permission for two female students to put on tefillin during morning prayers, becoming what was believed to be one of the first Modern Orthodox schools to do so. As of the 2024-25 school year, 5 females put on tefillin during morning prayers with support from the administration. In 2014, the school created a yearlong Jewish Sexual Ethics course for 10th graders that combined Jewish textual study with comprehensive sex education.

== Notable alumni ==
- Tal Lavin — American journalist
- Shabbos Kestenbaum — antisemitism activist
