= Zevi Samet =

American college basketball player (born 2003)

Personal information
- Born: 2003 (age 22–23) Monsey, New York, U.S.
- Listed height: 6 ft 2 in (1.88 m)

Career information
- High school: Torah Academy of Bergen County
- College: Yeshiva (2022–2026)
- Position: Shooting guard
- Number: 12

Zevi Samet (born 2003) is an American college basketball player. As a member of the Yeshiva University Maccabees, he became YU's all-time leading scorer in men's basketball.

== Biography ==
Samet was born in 2003 to Jenny and David Samet. He grew up as one of five siblings in an Orthodox Jewish family in Monsey, New York. He is a nephew of Rabbi Zvi Sobolofsky, a rosh yeshiva at Yeshiva University. He attended Torah Academy of Bergen County for high school, and studied at Yeshivat Reishit in Israel during his gap year.

He entered Yeshiva University in 2022, and majored in sociology. In his final game for Yeshiva University, Samet scored 43 points against the Emory Eagles in the sweet 16 of the 2026 NCAA Division III men's basketball tournament playoffs.

In January 2026, Samet became Yeshiva University's all-time leading scorer in men's basketball. He was named Skyline Conference Player of the Week several times. In March 2026, he was named by the National Association of Basketball Coaches (NABC) to the All-America First Team, and was named as a finalist for the Bevo Francis Award in April 2026.
