= Frisch School =

Private high school in Bergen County, New Jersey, United States

Location
- 120 West Century Road; Paramus, Bergen County, New Jersey 07652; United States; 40.934173°N 74.080172°W

Information
- Type: Private High School, Yeshiva
- Motto: Cougars Run Together
- Established: 1972
- Founder: Menachem Meier, Alfred Frisch and Isaac Swift
- NCES School ID: 00868382
- Principal: Rabbi Eli Ciner
- Faculty: 97.0 FTEs
- Grades: 9 – 12
- Enrollment: 998 (as of 2023–24)
- Student to teacher ratio: 10.3:1
- Colors: Red and white
- Team name: Cougars
- Accreditation: Middle States Association of Colleges and Schools
- Newspaper: The Paw Print
- Website: frisch.org

The Frisch School, also known as Yeshivat Frisch /frɪʃ/, is a coeducational, Modern Orthodox, yeshiva high school located in Paramus, New Jersey. It was founded in 1972 by Rabbi Menachem Meier, Alfred Frisch and Rabbi Isaac Swift. The school primarily serves the Jewish communities of northern New Jersey and southern New York.

The school is named for founder Alfred Frisch, who owned the land on which the original campus was situated prior to the school's inception in 1972. The school has been accredited by the Middle States Association of Colleges and Schools Commission on Elementary and Secondary Schools since 1992. Its accreditation expires in 2029. Over the last ten years the student population has grown from 580 to nearly 1000 students.

Frisch School is located at the Henry & Esther Swieca Family Campus, where it moved in 2007. The campus has 41 classrooms, a learning center, six science laboratories, a gymnasium, a library, music and art studios, a Beit Midrash, a "makerspace" (fabrication lab), and a publications room. Outdoors, the campus has a softball field, tennis courts, a basketball-hockey, a soccer field encircled by a running track as well as large turfed area with chair for students to lounge and hang-out. The campus is named in honor of Henry Swieca, who donated the campus.

== History ==
Founded in 1972 by Rabbi Menachem Meier, Alfred Frisch and Rabbi Isaac Swift, the school had been located at E. 243 Frisch Court in Paramus, on a 7-acre (28,000 m^{2}) plot of land.

For the 2007–08 school year, Frisch moved to 120 West Century Road in Paramus. Frisch purchased this site, 14 acres (57,000 m^{2}) of land and an 115,000-square-foot (10,700 m^{2}) office building, and renovated what had been an office building, constructing an 25,000-square-foot (2,300 m^{2}) addition. The campus is named in honor of Henry Swieca, who donated the campus. The former Frisch building was sold in 2015 to the school Ben Porat Yosef.

== Academics ==
Frisch offers a dual curriculum of Judaic and secular studies. Incoming students choose between eleven specialty tracks: Art; Beit Midrash; Culinary Arts and Food Science; Engineering; Entrepreneurship; Medical Sciences; Music; Philosophy, Politics and Economics; Sports Management Learning center and Business Analytics; World Languages; and Writing. Each track provides specialized academic/vocational training.

The school was re-accredited by the Middle States Association Commission on Elementary and Secondary Schools in 2020 and is now accredited through January 2029.

== Student population ==
Most of the students are from the Jewish communities of northern New Jersey and New York, with some commuting from Central New Jersey.

As of the 2023–24 school year, the school had an enrollment of 998 students and 97.0 classroom teachers (on an FTE basis), for a student–teacher ratio of 10.3:1.

== Co-curricular programs and activities ==
The school has over 100 student clubs, in areas including the arts, languages, sciences, leadership and other interests.

=== Sports ===
There are 25 athletic teams and seven athletic clubs in total. More than 70 percent of students participate on one or more of the sports teams and clubs. There are four basketball teams, one baseball team, two boys floor hockey teams, one girls floor hockey team, and one boys wrestling team, which consecutively won five Wittenberg wrestling titles. There are three volleyball teams – the girls volleyball teams have won the most championship games of any yeshiva volleyball team - three soccer teams, two swimming teams, three softball teams, one bowling team, and two track teams, among others. Frisch also has the first-ever yeshiva ice hockey team, which, in its first year of existence, qualified for the NJ state tournament. Frisch competes in ice hockey under the supervision of the New Jersey State Interscholastic Athletic Association. In 2016, half of Frisch's Yeshiva League sports teams qualified for the championships, and six teams won the championships.

The baseball team won three consecutive Metropolitan Yeshiva High School Athletic League titles (2014, 2015, 2016), and won the Columbus Baseball Invitational yeshiva high school tournament, dubbed the "Jewish World Series", in each of 2016 and 2017.

In 2015, Frisch won the Red Sarachek Tournament hosted by Yeshiva University for the first time. After losing in the championship game in 2013 and 2014, they defeated the Hebrew Academy of the Five Towns and Rockaway by a score of 75–73 in triple-overtime to claim the title. In 2017, Frisch came back and won the Sarachek Tournament, defeating the Shalhevet Firehawks (of Los Angeles) by a score of 49–47 in the tournament final.

In 2016, Frisch began hosting the Wittenberg Wrestling Tournament, after Yeshiva University announced that it would no longer host the annual event.

The ice hockey team won the McMullen Cup and Monsignor Kelly Cup in 2018. The team won the McMullen Cup in 2021 after defeating Scotch Plains-Fanwood High School by a score of 2–1 in the tournament final.

=== Chesed ===
A Chesed Society coordinates community projects throughout the year. Frisch students run a winter camp for children with special needs who have off from public school during the winter break week.

== Notable alumni ==
- Eitan Bernath (born 2002, class of 2020), social media personality, chef, and Principal Culinary Contributor on The Drew Barrymore Show
- Erica Brown, author, Vice Provost for Values and Leadership at Yeshiva University and the founding director of its Rabbi Lord Jonathan Sacks-Herenstein Center for Values and Leadership
- Jeremy Dauber, class of 1990, Rhodes Scholar and Columbia University Professor of Yiddish Literature
- Tali Farhadian Weinstein (born 1975/76), former federal prosecutor and former candidate for New York County District Attorney
- Alisa Flatow (1974–1995), victim of the Egged bus 36 bombing
- Daniel Fridman, S'gan Rosh Yeshiva of Torah Academy of Bergen County and Rabbi of the Jewish Center of Teaneck
- Jeremy Frommer, financier and entrepreneur
- Ryan Karben (born 1974), former New York State Assemblyman
- Sharon Kleinbaum (born 1959), Senior Rabbi of New York City's Congregation Beit Simchat Torah
- Jared Kushner (born 1981), businessman, real estate investor and senior advisor to his father-in-law President Donald Trump
- Arthur Lenk (born 1964), Israeli Ambassador to Azerbaijan, 2005–2009 and South Africa, 2013–2017
- Daniel S. Nevins (born 1966), Dean of the Rabbinical School of the Jewish Theological Seminary of America
- Michael Salzhauer (born 1972), plastic surgeon and social media celebrity
- Rick Schwartz (born c. 1968), film producer
- Rena Sofer (born 1968), actress
- Regina Spektor (born 1980), singer and songwriter, attended the school for freshman and sophomore years
- Gil Student (born 1972), rabbi and publisher

== Controversy ==
In 2018, students were invited to participate in a voluntary letter writing campaign thanking President Trump if they "believe[d] that the president's decision was correct" regarding the relocation of the U.S. Embassy from Tel Aviv to Jerusalem. They were informed of the letter-writing campaign by the school's then-director of Israel education and faculty adviser of the school's Israel advocacy club, Rabbi David Sher. However, the letter-writing campaign itself was initiated by the Israel Advocacy organization NORPAC. Instructions for participating in the campaign included a reminder to "sign your name at the bottom," while NORPAC's boiler-plate letter praised the president's "courageous leadership" for the embassy decision. Sher's email stated twice that the campaign was voluntary.

The email was sent to students without prior parental consent, and some parents at the school lodged complaints in private forums, stating that the move was "sycophantic" and that the school should be "apolitical" and not attempt to "normalize Trump." Journalists at Ha'aretz and Newsweek got wind of this disapproval, and published articles implying that the school forced or strongly urged all students to write letters praising Trump.

The school principal, Rabbi Eli Ciner, noted that these private conversations were leaked to the press also without parental consent. Ciner acknowledged that parents who did not agree with Trump complained, though stressed that the campaign was "completely voluntary" and that expression of different political opinions was an expression of democracy In a statement to the Jewish Telegraphic Agency, Ciner stated, “As a religious Zionist school, we encourage our students as civic minded American citizens to write to the administration when they agree or disagree with the government’s policies regarding the State of Israel. In this particular case, many of our students strongly supported the president’s decision recognizing Jerusalem as Israel’s capital.”

A columnist for Jewish Telegraphic Agency wrote regarding the letter writing campaign press coverage that "behaviors considered typical going back decades" were "distorted by their proximity to the 45th president" in this particular case, commenting that:

Missing in much of the reporting was the fact that like much of the mainstream Jewish community, most Jewish schools see teaching about and advocating for Israel a central part of their mission and a key to instilling Jewish identity. If anything, Israel advocacy training has increased as Jewish organizations invest more resources in fighting the Boycott, Divestment and Sanctions movement aimed at Israel.
