= Jeremy Dauber =

American academic

- Born: Jeremy Asher Dauber; February 20, 1973 (age 53)
- Education: Harvard University; University of Oxford
- Awards: Rhodes Scholarship
- Scientific career
- Fields: Yiddish and Jewish literature American Jewish culture American studies
- Workplaces: Columbia University

Jeremy Asher Dauber (born February 20, 1973) is the Atran Professor of Yiddish Language, Literature, and Culture in the Department of Germanic Languages at Columbia University, specializing in Yiddish and Jewish literature, American Jewish culture, and American studies.

== Biography ==
=== Early life and education ===
A native of Teaneck, New Jersey, Dauber attended Yavneh Academy and is a 1990 graduate of the Frisch School in Paramus, New Jersey. He graduated from Harvard College in 1995 summa cum laude with a degree in social studies and earned his DPhil from the University of Oxford in 1999 where he was a Rhodes Scholar. During his time at Oxford, Dauber wrote the libretto for an opera that was later played in Boston, Massachusetts.

=== Columbia University ===
Dauber began teaching as a professor at Columbia University in 2000. The Jewish Week described Dauber's rapid ascent to a position of influence in Yiddish letters, “Within a year of completing his doctorate in Yiddish literature at Oxford University, Jeremy Dauber returned to the United States, found a job heading the Yiddish studies program at Columbia University, and was invited by the National Yiddish Book Center to manage its ambitious compilation of a list of the 100 greatest works of modern Jewish literature."

Since 2008, he has been the director of the Institute for Israel and Jewish Studies at Columbia. In 2009, he was named an inaugural member of the Shalom Hartman Institute North American Scholars Circle.

Dauber's research interests include Yiddish literature of the early modern period, Hebrew and Yiddish literature of the nineteenth century, the Yiddish theater, the history of Jewish comedy, and American Jewish literature.

== Writing ==
Dauber wrote a column on television and movies for the Christian Science Monitor that was recognized by the National Society of Newspaper Columnists in 2003. He also wrote a movie that was screened at the Cannes Film Market.

Dauber is co-editor of the journal Prooftexts: A Journal of Jewish Literary History.

=== Books ===
- Antonio's Devils: Writers of the Jewish Enlightenment and the Birth of Modern Hebrew and Yiddish Literature (Stanford University Press, 2004)
- The Range of Yiddish: A Catalog of an Exhibition from the Yiddish Collection of the Harvard College Library, Marion Aptroot and Jeremy Dauber, Harvard University Press, 2005.
- Landmark Yiddish Plays (SUNY Press, 2006) co-editor and co-translator, with Joel Berkowitz
- The Worlds of Sholem Aleichem: The Remarkable Life and Afterlife of the Man Who Created Tevye (Schocken, 2013)
- Jewish Comedy: A Serious History (W.W. Norton, 2017)
- American Comics: A History (W.W. Norton, 2021)
- American Scary (Algonquin Books, 2021)
