= Torah Academy of Bergen County =

Yeshiva high school in Bergen County, New Jersey, United States

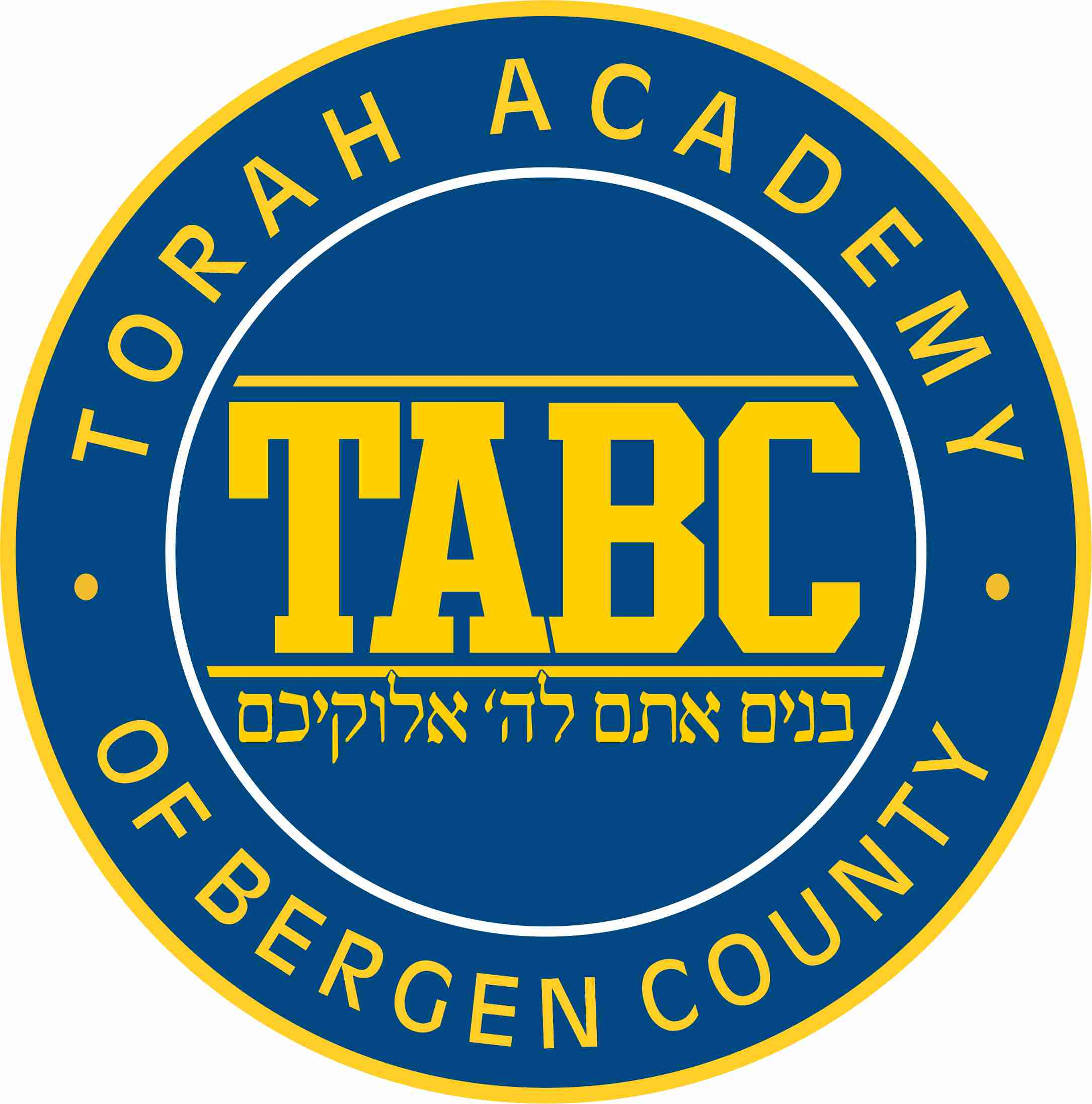

Location
- 1600 Queen Anne Road; Teaneck, Bergen County, New Jersey 07666; United States; 40.904722°N 74.001955°W

Information
- Type: Private, all-male Yeshiva high school
- Established: 1982
- NCES School ID: AA001514
- Head of school: Rabbi Shlomo Stochel
- Faculty: 47.5 FTEs
- Grades: 9–12
- Enrollment: 327 (as of 2019–20)
- Student to teacher ratio: 6.9:1
- Colors: Royal Blue and Gold
- Team name: Storm
- Accreditation: Middle States Association of Colleges and Schools
- Newspaper: Eye of the Storm; Storm Watch; Kol Torah; Science and Medical Report
- Affiliation: Modern Orthodox Judaism
- Website: www.tabc.org

Torah Academy of Bergen County (commonly referred to as TABC) is a four-year yeshiva high school located in Teaneck township of Bergen County, New Jersey, United States. The school utilizes a split-schedule day offering both Jewish studies and college preparatory secular courses. The school has been accredited by the Middle States Association of Colleges and Schools Commission on Elementary and Secondary Schools since 2005.

TABC is run by Rosh HaYeshiva Rabbi Joshua Kahn, head of school Rabbi Shlomo Stochel, as well as Mashgiach ruchani (religious guidance counselor) Rabbi Michael Hoenig.

As of the 2019–20 school year, the school had an enrollment of 327 students and 47.5 classroom teachers (on an FTE basis), for a student–teacher ratio of 6.9:1. The school's student body was 100% White.

== Academic programs ==
Various Advanced Placement (AP) courses are offered primarily to juniors and seniors, such as AP Biology, AP Calculus, AP English Language and Composition, AP English Literature and Composition, AP Physics, AP Psychology, AP Statistics, and AP United States History.

The building hosts a second school called the SINAI Special Needs Institute. The program serves children of below to above average intelligence with different degrees of learning disability and a wide variety of behavioral characteristics, whose needs could not be addressed by traditional Jewish day school programs and curricula.

== Extracurricular activities ==
TABC has a number of extracurricular activities, some that do well even on the international level. The school's Mock trial team was the 2005 New Jersey State Champions and received press coverage both in the Tri-State Region as well as overseas for its efforts to gain accommodations to participate in the National High School Mock Trial Championship in Charlotte, North Carolina without being required to compete during the Jewish Sabbath.

The school has an International Bible Contest (Chidon HaTanach) team which is coached by Rabbi Neil Winkler. In 2017, junior Shlomi Helfgot placed 4th in the world in the international competition which takes place in Jerusalem on Yom HaAtzma'ut.

The school also has a notable Science Olympiad Team, having won the Yeshiva League for the past 6 years, as well as College Bowl, with Junior Varsity having been undefeated since 2014.

== Athletics ==
TABC has various sports teams, including soccer, baseball, softball, basketball, hockey and wrestling and some others.

In an effort to build inter-community relationships in Teaneck, former Torah Academy athletic director Bobby Kaplan and then assistant principal Rabbi Tzvi Grumet, arranged for the TABC Storm to play a pair of exhibition basketball games in 2000 against the Knights of the Al-Ghazaly High School, a Muslim high school in the township.

The varsity hockey team has won the MYHSAL championship five times (1997–1998, 2006–2007, 2007–2008, 2012-2013 and 2015–2016). The JV team has won the MYHSAL championship a record nine times (1997–1998, 2002–2003, 2008–2009, 2009–2010, 2010–2011, 2011–2012, 2012–2013, 2013–2014, 2017–2018 and 2022-2023).

TABC's wrestling team had placed 3rd in the Wittenberg Championships from 2007 to 2010. In 2009, TABC had six finalists and two champions. In 2010, TABC had three champions - Navid Ahdoot (112 lbs), Evan Friedlander (171 lbs) and Dovid Greenfield (285 lbs) - as well as several second and third place wrestlers. In 2011 TABC placed second overall with three first-place winners including Shimmy Auman, Evan Friedlander, Dovid Greenfield. In 2013, TABC won Wittenberg with three champions, and eleven total placers. TABC wrestlers Efraim Ellman, Dovid Greenfield, Navid Ahdoot, Ramin Ahdoot and Lior Shachar have been inducted into the Wittenberg Hall of Fame. TABC Wrestling has also continued to place well at Wittenberg even fielding smaller teams. They have wrestled at the Brick Memorial Tournament, the Randolph Wrestling Tournament and the North Bergen Wrestling Tournament.

The TABC track team was undefeated in 2014–2015, 2015-2016, and 2016–2017. The team is coached by alumnus Shmuel Knoller ('13). Notably, Zachary Greenberg came in 3rd place in his age group in the Jerusalem Marathon in 2016.

The school also has both a varsity and junior varsity basketball team coached by former St. John's assistant Coach Oswald "Oz" Cross.

The TABC Athletics department has been run by Oren Glickman since 2023.

== Yeshiva University Red Sarachek Tournament ==
The Yeshiva University Red Sarachek basketball tournament plays some of its games in the TABC gym, for which they received an award in 2004. TABC also participated in Sarachek in 2012, entering the tournament as the 13th seed and finishing ranked #12 overall. In 2016, TABC again participated in the tournament, entering as the #9 seed. In the first round, TABC defeated the Rabbi Alexander S. Gross Hebrew Academy Warriors on a last second shot, but were defeated in the second round by eventual-champion DRS Wildcats 34–31.

In 2025, TABC entered the Sarachek tournament as the fourth seed and would go on to beat the Magen David Yeshiva Warriors in the national championship game with a final score of 61-49, earning TABC their first ever Sarachek title.

== Notable alumni ==
- Zevi Samet (born 2003), college basketball player
