= Gush Etzion Junction =

Road junction in the West Bank

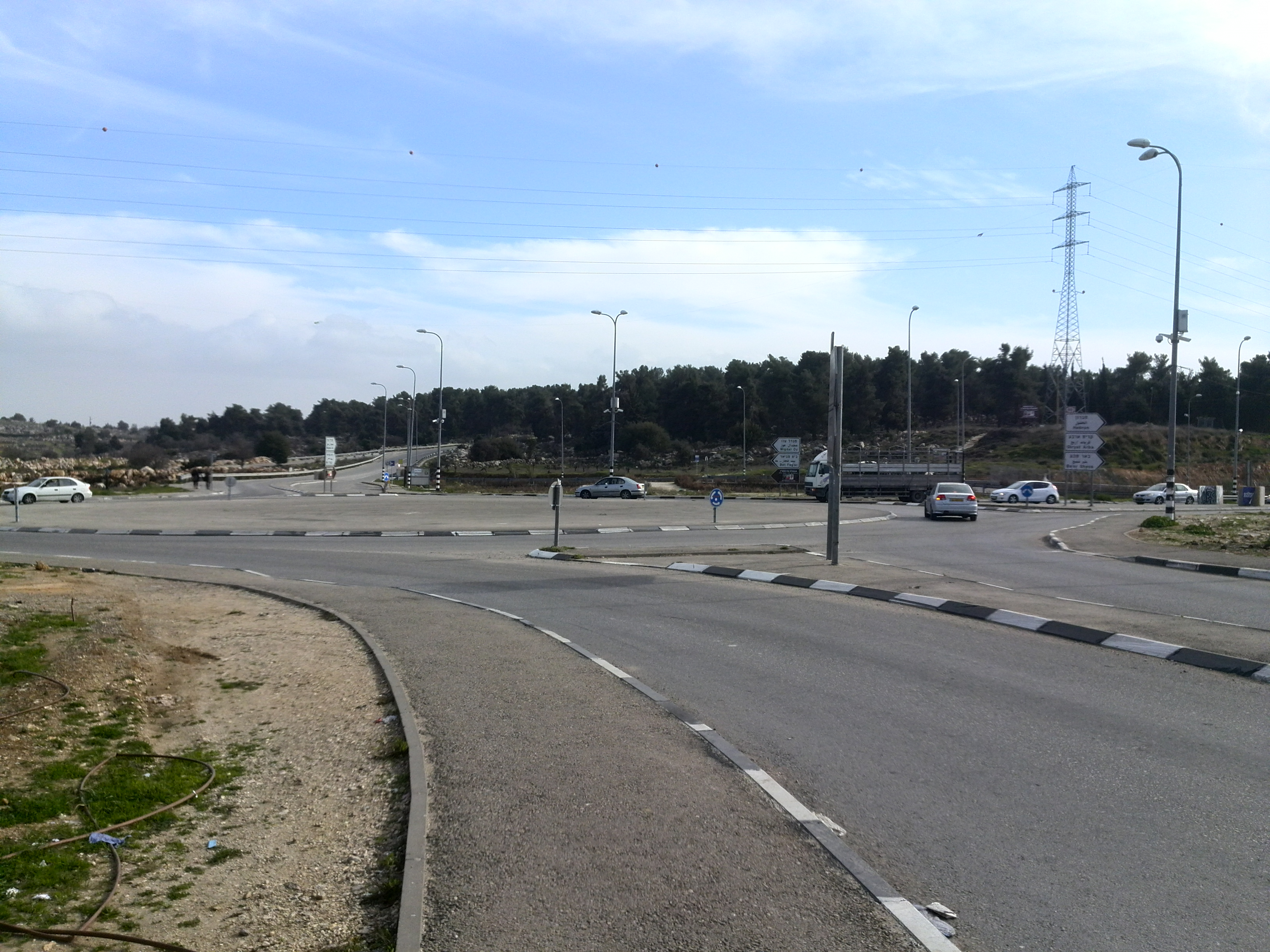
- The Junction in 2015
- Interactive map of Gush Etzion Junction

Location
- Gush Etzion, West Bank
- Coordinates: 31°38′46.05″N 35°7′55.85″E
- Roads at junction: Highway 60; Route 367

Construction
- Type: Roundabout intersection
- Opened: Early 1930s

Gush Etzion Junction (Hebrew: צומת גוש עציון, romanized: Tzomet HaGush Etzion), also known simply as Gush Junction, is a 120-dunam (0.12 km^{2}; 0.046 sq mi) business, commercial and tourism center in the southern West Bank, which serves as the entry point to the Gush Etzion bloc of settlements. It is administered by the Gush Etzion Regional Council.

Long known as a "congenial meeting spot for Israelis and Palestinians," in the autumn of 2015 the junction was the site of about ten Palestinian attacks against Israelis.

== Geography ==
Gush Etzion Junction is located in the northern Judean Hills at about 950 metres (3,120 ft) above sea level. The junction is a 25-metre (82 ft) diameter roundabout at the intersection of Route 60 and Route 367. Nearby communities include Efrat, Elazar, Alon Shvut, Kfar Etzion, Migdal Oz and Beit Fajjar. It is a 15-minute drive to the southern Jerusalem neighborhood of Gilo.

== History ==
In 1926, Zichron David purchased lands that included the area of this junction, with the aim of establishing a Jewish settlement on the Jerusalem-Hebron highway.

In 1933, Shmuel Zvi Holtzman purchased the place from Zichron David. He then established a clinic at this junction for both Jewish and Arab residents living in the area to maintain good neighborly relations.

== Establishments ==
Adjacent to the junction on the northwest are a plant nursery, a shop selling snacks, cigarettes and lottery tickets and The Gush Etzion Winery and its mehadrin dairy/fish restaurant, BaYekev.

On the southwest are a gas station, an automotive repair shop, an electronics store, a Judaica center and a Rami Levy discount supermarket. Attached to the supermarket is a hamburger joint, a pizzeria and a discount clothing store, all part of the Rami Levi group. In 2015 a competing chain of supermarkets, Shufersal opened a store.

In 2007, Rami Levy had begun construction of Harim Mall, a two-story shopping mall as an extension to the south side of the supermarket and above it. This mall opened in late 2015.

A visitors' center is located four kilometres (2.5 mi) to the west in Kibbutz Kfar Etzion as is the mehadrin dairy/fish restaurant, Gavna.

== Attacks ==
The hitchhiking post at the junction has been the site of a number of shootings and stabbings, as well as several failed attempts at attacks.

=== Attacks ===
- October 2005: Three killed, three injured in a shooting attack at the junction.
- January 2006: A Palestinian man stabs an Israeli man and girl; the attacker is shot and injured by an off-duty police officer.
- December 2009: A woman is stabbed in the back by a Palestinian man.
- November 2015: 2015 Gush Etzion Junction shooting on November 19, 2015, a Palestinian man shot and killed 3 people (including American student, Ezra Schwartz, and Alon Shvut resident Rabbi Yaakov Don) and wounded 5. On November 23, 2015, A Palestinian man stabbed and killed a 21-year-old student Hadar Buchris. He was shot and killed by security forces at the scene. In response, the government is planning bypass roads to separate Israeli vehicles from Palestinian vehicles at this junction.
- September 2018: A Palestinian teenager, Khalil Jabarin, 17, from Yatta fatally stabbed a 45-year-old Israeli-American man who lived in Efrat, Ari Fuld, at a shopping mall near the Gush Etzion junction.
- November 2025: Palestinian Islamic Jihad carried out a car-ramming and mass stabbing that killed one civilian and injured others, including a child.

=== Attempted attacks ===
- November 2010: A Palestinian man attempted to stab Israeli civilians at the junction and was arrested by the IDF.
- January 2011: Shots were fired in the area; there were no injuries.
- October 2015: A Palestinian man tried to ram into Israelis waiting at a bus stop but hit the concrete blocks placed there to stop such attacks. A 20-year-old IDF soldier and a 21-year-old Israeli civilian were lightly wounded. He exited his car with a knife drawn and tried to stab his victims and was shot and killed.
- March 2016 On March 15, 2016, an Arab woman described by authorities as a terrorist was injured after she drove her car to attack a bus shelter, but lost control as IDF soldiers shot into her car, and crashed into bollard poles protecting the bus stop before she could hurt anyone. She was immediately apprehended and taken to hospital for treatment of her injuries.
