= Yeshiva Derech HaTorah =

Coordinates: 40.615878°N 73.944768°W

- ישיבה דרך התורה

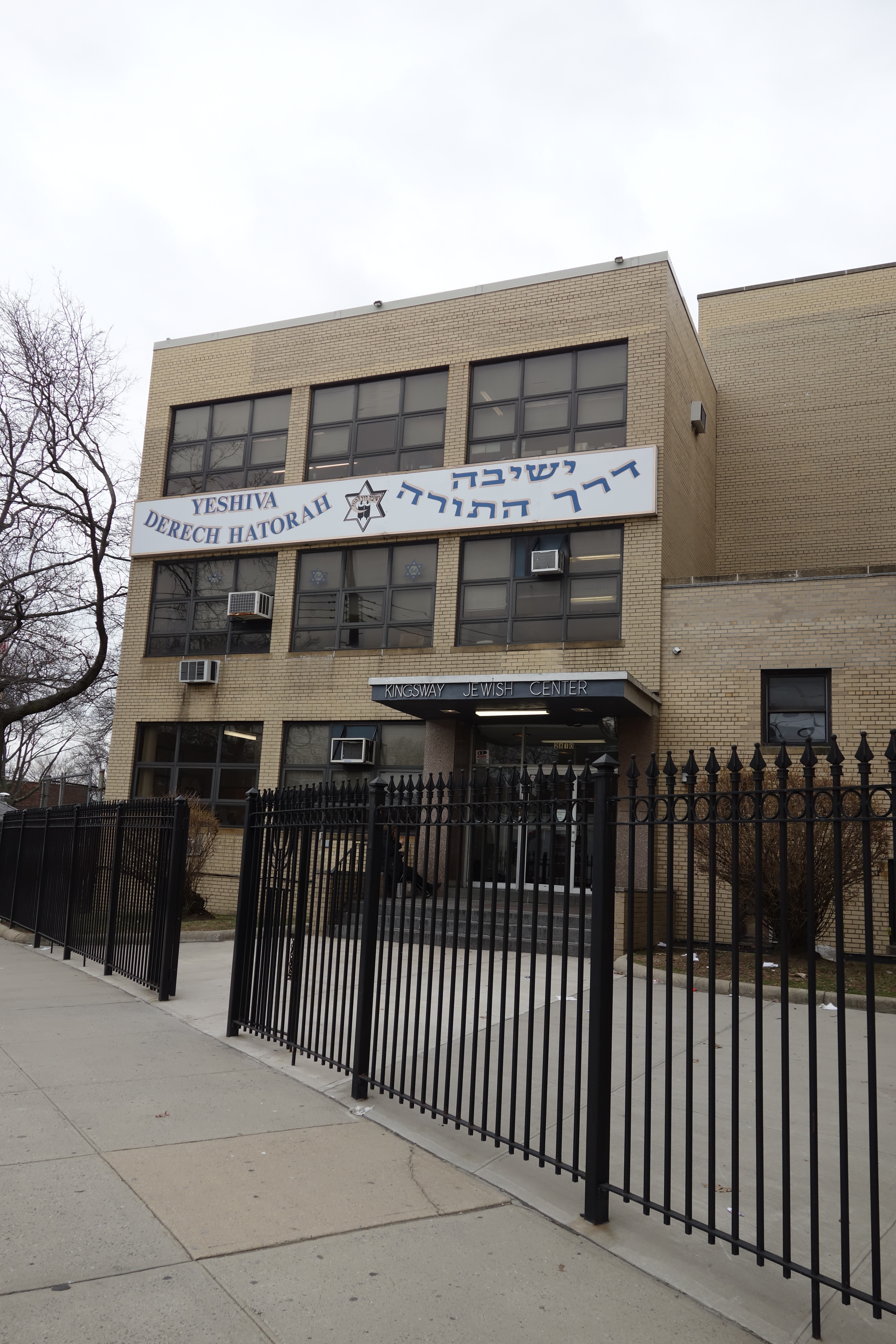
- Yeshiva Derech HaTorah

Location
- 2810 Nostrand Avenue; Brooklyn, New York; USA

Information
- Type: Jewish Modern Orthodox
- Motto: Big brain ideas
- Established: 1980 as Yeshivat Mizrachi L'Banim
- Principal: Rabbi Elimelech Chanales
- Grades: K–8,9-12
- Enrollment: 265
- Colors: ES blue & white, HS burgundy & cream
- Website: www.ydh.org

Yeshiva Derech HaTorah is an Orthodox Jewish elementary school and high school for boys in Brooklyn, New York. Yeshiva Derech HaTorah is chartered by the Board of Regents of the University of the State of New York.

The school is dedicated to the teachings of Orthodox Judaism, and has a fully approved New York State general studies curriculum as well. It enrolls students from K through 12th grade. The nursery program was discontinued in 2015. As of the 2015-16 school year, the school had an enrollment of 227 students in kindergarten through twelfth grades according to the New York State Department of Education.

In September 2006, Yeshiva Derech HaTorah High School opened.

The school's motto is "Excellence in Education, in your Neighborhood".

== Leadership ==
The current principal of Yeshiva Derech HaTorah Elementary School and High School is Rabbi Elimelech Chanales. The elementary school general studies principal is Mr. Yehuda Goldstein. The founding principal of Yeshiva Derech HaTorah High School was Rabbi Yisroel Grossberg. The current High School principal is Rabbi Dov Milstein. The high school literary magazine Epiphany began publication in 2009 under the guidance of faculty advisor and chair of the English Department Carol Hagler. In 2012 the literary magazine was renamed The Write Stuff.

== History ==
In 1979, a group of Brooklyn parents met to discuss the need for a new type of Yeshiva. Not satisfied with the existing schools, they were seeking an Orthodox all boys Yeshiva completely devoted to Torah, and firmly committed to the State of Israel. Philosophical guidelines were drawn up to provide an education in Ahavat Torah, Ahavat Am Yisroel and Ahavat Eretz Yisroel.

In September 1980, the Yeshiva opened its doors as a preschool in the Beth Abraham Synagogue on Bragg Street. To accommodate the many requests for admission, the school moved the next year to larger quarters in the Young Israel of Bedford Bay on Brown Street expanding to elementary grades. The Yeshiva quickly outgrew those quarters, and relocated to its present home in the Kingsway Jewish Center. Here the school continued to grow with classes from nursery to eighth grade. In 1995 the school’s name was changed from Yeshivat Mizrachi L’Banim to Yeshiva Derech HaTorah. The name change did not represent a departure from the philosophy or ideology of the founding parents in 1979. In September 2006, Yeshiva Derech HaTorah High School opened.

== Student demographics ==
Yeshiva Derech HaTorah is made up of Jewish students and teachers from a variety of backgrounds. The school is predominantly Ashkenazi Jews, whose families originated from communities in Germany, Poland, Eastern Europe and Russia although there are a number of students from the Sephardic or Syrian community.
