= Murder of Ari Fuld =

2018 murder in the West Bank

- Location: 31°38′43.287″N 35°7′49.874″E; Harim mall, Gush Etzion Junction, West Bank, Palestine
- Date: September 16, 2018; 8 years ago
- Weapon: knife
- Deaths: 1
- Injuries: 1 (perpetrator)
- Victim: Ari Fuld
- Perpetrator: Khalil Jabarin
- Convictions: intentionally causing death

On 16 September 2018, American-Israeli settler and activist Ari Fuld (Hebrew: ארי פולד), was stabbed to death by Palestinian Khalil Jabarin at the Gush Etzion Junction in the West Bank. Jabarin was sentenced to life imprisonment and scheduled to be released during a prisoner exchange during the Gaza war. In June 2025, the US Supreme Court decided Fuld v. Palestine Liberation Organization, finding unanimously that Israeli victims of terrorism can sue the Palestinian Authority.

== Background ==
Born in 1972 or 1973, Fuld was originally from Queens, New York. He and his brothers attended Salanter Akiba Riverdale Academy, an Orthodox school in the Bronx where his father was the principal. He graduated from Yeshiva University High School in 1991 and immigrated to Israel in 1994. A Holocaust survivor's grandson, Fuld served in an elite unit in the Israeli paratroopers. According to his father, he was a heavy machine gunner. He chose to remain in the reserves after he had completed his required time there. While serving in the 2006 Lebanon War, he suffered minor shrapnel injuries. He was a fourth-degree black belt in tora dojo, a form of karate developed by American Jews, which he also taught.

The married father of four lived in the Israeli settlement of Efrat in the West Bank, where he served as a member of the security team. Known on social media for his advocacy for Israel and Israeli settlements in the West Bank, he was occasionally suspended from Facebook for his comments in online discussions. He was also a host on "Frenemies", an ILTV show. Fuld worked for Standing Together, an organization that supports Israel Defense Forces (IDF) soldiers, and was known to organize care packages for soldiers fighting in Gaza. He was a member of The Jewish Home, a right-wing, religious Zionist party. One of his brothers, Hillel, is a tech influencer and pro-Israel advocate. Another brother, Eytan, is Bezalel Smotrich's spokesperson.

== Killing ==
On 16 September 2018, 17-year-old Palestinian Khalil Yusef Ali Jabarin went to the Harim mall at the Gush Etzion Junction near the Kfar Etzion settlement in the West Bank. The shopping mall was open to both Palestinian and Israeli customers. According to a mall employee, he bought falafel from her. Security footage shows Jabarin waiting behind Fuld for a minute before stabbing him in the back. Next, Fuld chased Jabarin, jumping over a small wall, and his legs buckled. After righting himself, Fuld pulled his gun and shot Jabarin before collapsing. Another Israeli civilian also shot Jabarin. Paramedics took Fuld to Shaare Zedek Medical Center where he was pronounced dead; Jabarin was taken to Hadassah Hospital Mount Scopus and survived. Fuld was credited with possibly saving the life of the mall employee. The employee said that Jabarin had run at her with his knife drawn and that Fuld is "not just a hero. He gave his life for me." Fuld was one of dozens of Israelis killed in stabbings, shootings and car-rammings, by Palestinians or Israeli Arabs since late 2015. More than 260 Palestinians killed by Israelis were killed in the same period. According to the Israeli government, most were killed in self-defense.

=== Reactions ===
Fuld had a large social media following. After his murder, a crowdfunding campaign by his family raised over $1 million. Thousands of people attended Fuld's funeral in Kfar Etzion. Israeli Prime Minister Benjamin Netanyahu met with Fuld's family before the funeral and later tweeted, "I embraced [the family] in the name of the entire nation in this time of terrible grief. We are alive thanks to heroes like Ari. We will remember him forever." Retired British army officer Richard Kemp said that Fuld was "a soldier to the last". U.S. Ambassador to Israel David Friedman attended Fuld's funeral and tweeted that "America grieves as one of its citizens was brutally murdered by a Palestinian terrorist." Fuld was also eulogized by Dov Lipman, the The Jewish Home party, and former IDF spokesperson Peter Lerner.

Jabarin's father told ABC News that he believed he would be fired from his job in Israel. He stated that "If I knew my son was planning this I would have tied him up with a rope at home and prevented him from leaving." Shortly after the attack, Jabarin's mother reported that she had informed Palestinian and Israeli security forces that Jabarin planned to carry out an attack but that Palestinian police were unable to locate him. The IDF confirmed her statement but said that the attack happened shortly after she had spoken to them. Later in court, it was reported that she came to the checkpoint searching for her son and that she did not inform the soldier why. A spokesman for Hamas praised the killing as a "natural response to Israeli crimes against Palestinians". The mayor of Yatta, Jabarin's hometown in the West Bank, called for an end to violence on all sides. He stated that the Israeli government "incites" attacks and is "pushing the Palestinian people everywhere".

The Palestinian Authority (PA) denied a report from an Israeli outlet that it had paid Jabarin's family soon after Fuld's death. The PA stated that Jabarin's family could apply for financial support from the Palestinian Authority Martyrs Fund during Jabarin's imprisonment. Such payments, given to the families of Palestinians imprisoned or killed by Israel, are criticized by many Israelis as "pay to slay" incentives for Palestinians to attack Israelis. PA official Nabil Shaath characterized the payments as welfare and support for victims of Israeli violence. David Friedman criticized the payments as a misuse of American taxpayer funds "to fund stipends to terrorists and their families". In July 2018, the Israeli government had passed a law intended to prevent these payments by confiscating tax money it collected on behalf of the PA.

== Trial ==
The day after Fuld's murder, IDF soldiers raided the Jabarin home to map out the building and prepare it for demolition. They also detained Jabarin's brother. The IDF released a statement that they will destroy the Jabarins' home in order "to act determinedly to prevent terror attacks and to deter terrorists". The practice has been criticized as collective punishment. The Jabarin family appealed the demolition, but Israel's Supreme Court rejected the appeal. Fuld's widow supported the demolition. The home was ultimately blown up by the IDF in January 2019.

According to the Jerusalem Post, Jabarin was charged with murder, three counts of attempted murder, and possession of an unlicensed weapon. The Judea Juvenile Military Court ordered that he remain in custody until the end of the trial. Jabarin was convicted of Fuld's murder and additional charges of attempted murder in January 2020. He was sentenced to life in prison, and the Fuld family was awarded 1.25 million shekels ($365,000) in damages.

== Legacy and aftermath ==
In November 2018, the Israel Police posthumously awarded Fuld the Medal of Distinction. The commendation praised Fuld for halting Jabarin's attack and for his advocacy work against the boycott, sanctions, and divestment movement. Fuld's family founded the Ari Fuld Project with the aim of continuing projects he worked on. It provides support to IDF soldiers and awards an annual "Lion of Zion" prize.

In 2020, Fuld's family filed a lawsuit against Iran and Syria for allegedly supporting Hamas. Four years later, a US district court fined Iran and Syria $191 million. In June 2025, the US Supreme Court decided Fuld v. Palestine Liberation Organization, finding unanimously that Israeli victims of terrorism can sue the Palestinian Authority. The decision overturned a lower court's ruling that it had no jurisdiction over the PA. In August 2025, Fuld's family joined a lawsuit alleging that UNRWA provides assistance to Hamas and Hezbollah.

Jabarin was to be freed as part of a hostages-and-prisoners exchange in February 2025 during the 2025 Gaza war ceasefire. As part of the deal, Jabarin would be deported from Israel to Yatta and permanently banned from entering Israeli territory. At the last minute, Netanyahu halted the exchange over Hamas holding "humiliating" ceremonies during the release of Israeli hostages.
