= Rick Schwartz =

American film producer

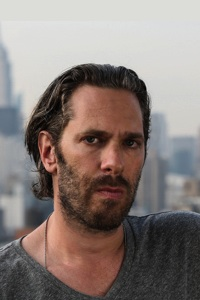
- Born: New York
- Occupations: Film and TV Producer

Rick Schwartz is an American film and television producer and financier based in New York, whose credits include The Departed, Black Swan, Gangs of New York, Machete, The Others, and Lip Sync Battle.

== Career ==
Schwartz began his film career at Miramax under Harvey and Bob Weinstein, working there for seven years and eventually serving as the company's senior vice president of production. At Miramax, Schwartz oversaw the development and production of projects including Martin Scorsese’s Gangs of New York, and The Departed, and Alejandro Amenabar’s The Others.

In 2008, Schwartz founded Overnight Productions, which has financed and produced movies by directors including Robert Rodriguez, Darren Aronofsky and Gela Babluani.

Later, Schwartz partnered with American financier, Jeremy Frommer to develop a technology company. He co-founded Jerrick Media, a producer and distributor of digital media content, in 2013.

== Filmography ==
He was a producer in all films unless otherwise noted.

=== Film ===
Year	Film	Credit
2000	Love's Labour's Lost	Associate producer
2000	Malèna	Executive producer
2001	The Others	Executive producer
2001	Birthday Girl	Executive producer
2002	Gangs of New York	Co-executive producer
2003	The Battle of Shaker Heights	Executive producer
2003	The Human Stain	Executive producer
2004	The Aviator	Executive producer
2006	The Departed	Co-producer
2007	First Born	
2007	The Lucky Ones	
2009	Labor Pains	
2010	13	
2010	Machete	
2010	Black Swan	Executive producer
2013	Machete Kills	

Miscellaneous crew

Year	Film	Role
1998	The Mighty	Assistant: Harvey Weinstein
1998	Shakespeare in Love	Assistant: Harvey Weinstein
2001	Birthday Girl	Production executive: Miramax

Production manager

Year	Film	Role
2000	Malèna	Executive in charge of production

Thanks

Year	Film	Role
2010	Hesher	Special thanks

=== Television ===
Year	Title	Credit	Notes
2015	Nate Bargatze: Full Time Magic	Executive producer	Television special
2015	Sharing	Executive producer	Television film
2015−18	Lip Sync Battle	Executive producer Supervising producer	
