= SINAI Special Needs Institute =

Disability organization in New York, United States

Coordinates: 40.90181°N 73.99892°W

SINAI Schools is an organization based in the New York metropolitan area that provides education for children and young adults with special needs. SINAI is the only Jewish day school for children with special needs that has received accreditation from the Middle States Association of Colleges and Schools.

== Individualized special education ==
SINAI's student-to-professional ratio is greater than 1:2. This allows SINAI to create, implement, closely monitor, and, as needed, regularly modify an individualized program for each child. SINAI provides speech, language, occupational, psychological, and behavioral therapies. SINAI also provides mainstreaming opportunities in academic, social, and vocational settings.

== Schools and programs ==
=== Elementary schools ===
SINAI includes elementary divisions partnered with SAR Academy in Riverdale, SINAI at RYNJ in River Edge, New Jersey, and SINAI at JKHA in Livingston, New Jersey, and SINAI at Yeshiva of Central Queens (YCQ) in Queens, New York. SINAI elementary schools serve children with a wide range of special needs, including complex learning disabilities, social and neurological conditions such as Autism Spectrum and anxiety disorders, and developmental disabilities. Students are placed into social and academic age groups based on their individual needs.

=== High schools ===
Depending on their needs, students will be placed either in an academically rigorous program, designed for children with academic and/or social challenges including complex learning disabilities and Aspergers, or into a functionally academic program, designed for children with developmental disabilities.

Students who are ready for an academically rigorous program but who face learning disabilities or social skills challenges benefit from SINAI's Maor High School at Rae Kushner Yeshiva High School in Livingston, New Jersey. Many students at Maor fall into a "gray area" where they might otherwise attend a mainstream high school but would struggle academically or socially as a result. At Maor, these same children are able to take advantage of everything that Kushner has to offer them socially while learning in small classes tailored to their specific needs, and attending selected mainstream classes with the support they need to succeed.

Students with intellectual or developmental disabilities attend SINAI's Karasick Shalem High Schools at TABC (in Teaneck, New Jersey), Ma'ayanot (in Teaneck, New Jersey), and Heichal HaTorah (in Teaneck, New Jersey). The functional academic program at Shalem provides students with the skills they need to succeed as they move into adulthood within the inclusive environment of their partner schools. Karasick Shalem High School at Heichal HaTorah serves boys aged 18–21 who have graduated from Shalem at TABC.

== Adult programming ==
SINAI also offers an adult transitional program with the Nathan Miller SHELI (Supported Home Environment for Learning Independence) residence for men. SHELI is designed to meet the social, recreational, and emotional needs of young adults with developmental disabilities in the context of a supervised housing facility. This program guides young adults through their transitions to group living while promoting their independence as adults.
