= Salanter Akiba Riverdale Academy =

Coordinates: 40°54′14″N 73°54′40″W

Salanter Akiba Riverdale Academy (SAR Academy)
- ישיבת סער
- Riverdale, Bronx, New York; United States

Information
- Type: Private coeducational primary, middle, and secondary
- Established: 1969
- Principal: Rabbi Binyamin Krauss
- Grades: PreK-8
- Enrollment: approx. 1,000
- Colors: Yellow and black
- Mascot: Bee
- Nickname: SAR
- Accreditation: New York State Association of Independent Schools; The Blue Ribbon Award (For academic excellence)
- Affiliation: Open Orthodox
- Website: www.saracademy.org

Salanter Akiba Riverdale Academy, better known by the acronym, SAR Academy, is a coeducational, private Modern Orthodox Jewish day school. The school is located in the Riverdale section of the New York City borough of the Bronx.

Its name derives from the three schools which merged to form it, Salanter (named after Rabbi Yisrael Salanter), Akiba, and the Riverdale Academy, all Jewish day schools. The three schools merged in 1968 and adopted the current name. The school is situated on the former estate of the Italian operatic and symphonic conductor Arturo Toscanini. The land for the school was purchased in 1968. The school moved into its new building in 1974. Designed by Caudill Rowlett Scott, the building was given the Albert S. Bard Award in 1975.

The school's founding principal was Rabbi Sheldon Chwat, who was succeeded by former assistant principal Rabbi Yonah Fuld. Rabbi Fuld was succeeded by then assistant principal Rabbi Joel Cohn. All of the former principals subsequently moved to Israel. Rabbi Binyamin Krauss began his tenure as principal at the start of the 2005–06 academic year. As of 2024, the administration is rounded out by associate principals Sarah Jabbour, Sharon Richter, Beth Pepper, and Rebecca Ostro Nagata.

The school is closely affiliated with SAR High School, which is headed by the former assistant principal of the academy, Rabbi Tully Harcsztark. Slightly more than half of the High School's student body is made up of students from the elementary school.

SAR requires students to take a dual curriculum, taking both General Studies courses as well as Judaic Studies. General Studies classes include Math, Science, English and Social Studies. The Judaic Studies courses are Hebrew language, Mishnah, Talmud (Gemara) and Bible studies (Tanakh).

During the 1991–92 school year, Salanter Akiba Riverdale Academy was recognized with the Blue Ribbon School Award of Excellence by the United States Department of Education, the highest award an American school can receive. The school also fostered a creative arts program that began in 1985, headed by musician and educator, Jonathan Dzik and professional stage/film producer, Jay Michaels.

== Predecessor schools ==
Akiba Hebrew Academy was affiliated with the Hebrew Institute of University Heights, predecessor to the Hebrew University of Riverdale. Members of the congregation asked its rabbi, Simon G. Kramer, to form a day school, because the area public schools were inadequate. It started with kindergarten in 1947, in the Hebrew Institute building, and added grades annually until it had a full K-8 program. Kramer led the school until 1964, when he left to head the Hebrew Theological College in Chicago. The school dissolved three years later, merging with Salanter and Riverdale.

Salanter Yeshiva originated in Harlem around 1906 by Rabbi Shmarya Leib Hurwitz, a constituent of his Rabbi Israel Salanter Synagogue and Talmud Torah. The organization was located at 114th Street and Madison Avenue. It later moved to 74 East 118th Street, and in 1923, to 1389 Washington Avenue in the Bronx. At this time, it was also called Yeshiva D'Bronx. In 1940, it moved to 1946 Webster Avenue. In 1970, it merged with Akiba and Riverdale.

== Controversies and investigations ==
=== Systemic sexual abuse ===
==== Stanley Rosenfeld, assistant principal ====
Stanley Rosenfeld, a convicted sex offender, was an assistant principal and English teacher at SAR. Nearly 40 witnesses have testified that while they were students there, Rosenfeld would invite children to his home on shabbat for a sleepover, and sexually abuse them while they slept. There are also allegations of physical abuse. When other faculty alerted the principal, no actions were taken. Even after he was dismissed from the school, he was brought back to teach language arts, years later. In a documented report, it is noted that administrators were aware of his actions even when he was hired back.

==== Rabbi Sheldon Schwartz, teacher ====
Schwartz, formerly a Judaics teacher at SAR, was also named in reports of systemic sexual abuse at SAR. Former students reported that he assisted Rosenfeld in recruiting students for sleepovers, stayed with them overnight as well, and told students that their abuse had been a dream. He was employed until his dismissal in 2018.

=== Production of child pornography ===
Rabbi Jonathan Skolnick was the associate principal of Judaic Studies at SAR until he was arrested by the FBI on September 13, 2019, for the production of child pornography, on charges of "charges of child enticement; production, receipt, and possession of child pornography; and sending extortionate communications" with the students of SAR. It was disclosed to the school in an email sent the following Monday, three days after his arrest on Friday night. Skolnick was accused of posing as several teenage girls to trick underage boys into sending nude photographs of themselves, and then threatening to publicly release the ones he had to secure the sending of more. Geoffrey Berman at the Department of Justice commented that "This arrest exemplifies law enforcement's ability to detect those attempting to use the 'anonymity' of the internet to prey on young children."

The FBI investigation revealed some evidence that Skolnick had a known pattern of such behavior prior to his appointment at SAR.

Skolnick pled guilty on April 5, 2022, to one count of child enticement and one count of possession of child pornography and in October, Skolnick was sentenced to 15 years in prison.

== Notable alumni ==
- Dahlia Adler, author
- Brian Ash, screenwriter, producer
- Ari Fuld, Israeli settler, activist, murder victim
- Hillel Fuld, businessman
- Ari Gold, singer-songwriter
- Shabbos Kestenbaum, antisemitism activist
- Ralph Lauren, fashion designer (Salanter)
- Achinoam Nini, singer-songwriter
- Chaim Potok, author (graduated from Salanter)
- Regina Spektor, singer-songwriter
- Jonathan Tropper, novelist
