= Mock trial =

Simulation of court hearings

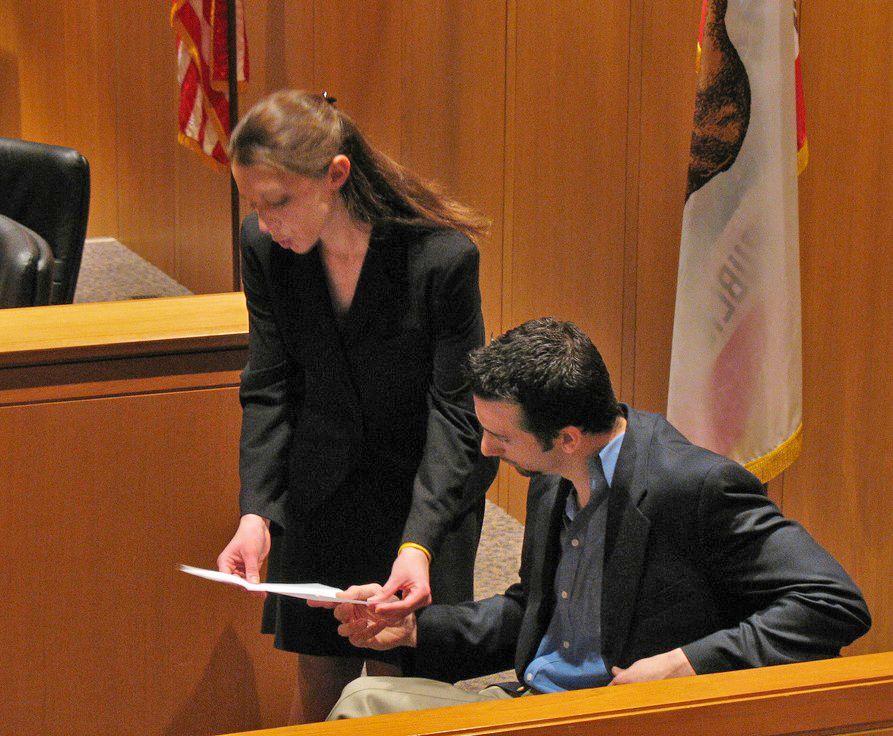
Mock trials allow researchers to examine confirmation biases in a realistic setting.

A mock trial is an act or imitation trial. It is similar to a moot court, but mock trials simulate lower-court trials, while moot court simulates appellate court hearings. Attorneys preparing for a real trial might use a mock trial consisting of volunteers as role players to test theories or experiment with each other. Mock trial is also the name of an extracurricular program in which students participate in rehearsed trials to learn about the legal system in a competitive manner. Interscholastic mock trials take place on all levels including primary school, middle school, high school, college, and law school. Mock trial is often taught in conjunction with a course in trial advocacy or takes place as an after school enrichment activity. Some gifted and talented programs may also take place in one.

== Litigation related mock trials ==
Litigators may use mock trials to assist with trial preparation and settlement negotiations of actual cases. Unlike school-related mock trials, these mock trials can take numerous forms depending on the information sought. For example, when faced with complex fact issues in a particular case, attorneys might convene a mini mock trial to try different methods of presenting their evidence, sometimes before a jury.

== Competitive school-related mock trials around the world ==
=== Asia Pacific ===
Guam has been hosting the annual Asia-Pacific Invitational Mock Trial Competition. In 2011 and 2012, there were 14 teams from Guam, South Korea, and Saipan in its 4th annual competition. The competition was held at the Superior Court of Guam. The teams made up of mostly junior and senior students from high schools. The Champion of the 4th Annual Asia-Pacific Invitational Mock Trial Competition was Marianas Baptist Academy of Saipan.

=== Australia ===
Mock trial competitions in Australia are held regionally. These include:

- The Law Society of South Australia Mock Trial Competition comprises a series of simulated court cases by students years 10, 11 and 12 from 32 schools in South Australia.
- The Law Society of Western Australia Interschool Mock Trial Competition is held each year for students enrolled in years 10, 11 and 12 in Western Australia. There were 773 students representing 68 teams from 38 schools participated in 2011.
- The Capital Region Mock Trial Competition is organized by University of Canberra. There were teams of schools in Australian Capital Territory region with year 10, 11 and 12 students.
- The New South Wales Mock Trial Competition has been running since 1981 for students years 10 and 11 in New South Wales initially with 28 schools. There have also been international events with mock trial competitions between Australia and the United Kingdom. In 2008, schools from this region also traveled to New York City to compete in the Empire Mock Trial Competition. The first Asia-Australia mock trial competition via video conference between Australian teams and a Korean team was held in 2009.

=== Continental Europe ===
Mock trials in continental Europe are less coordinated than their UK or US counterparts, but there are a few isolated examples. In Germany, the Faculty of Legal Sciences of the University of Regensburg organizes the REGINA Mock Trial. The University of Erlangen-Nuremberg organizes a mock trial specialized in administrative law. In Spain, there is a mock trial program specialized in insurance law coordinated by the Fundacion INADE-UDC Chair of Risk Management and Insurance.

=== United Kingdom ===
The National Bar Mock Trial Competition involves students taking on the roles of barristers and witnesses and presenting their case against teams from other schools. Young Citizens, in association with His Majesty's Courts and Tribunal Service and the Bar Council, has been running Mock Trial Competitions annually since 1991. The competition consists of several regional heats and a national final to decide the winner. In 2022/23, 938 students aged between 15 – 18 years old from 144 schools participated in the competition. The heats were supported by over 70 legal volunteers, including judges, barristers and law students.

The Magistrates Mock Trial Competition, organised by Young Citizens in association with the Magistrates Association, involves students taking on the roles of magistrates and witnesses. In 2022/2023, approximately 2,900 students aged between 12 – 14 years from 193 schools participated in the competition. The heats were supported by approximately 600 legal volunteers, including judges, barristers and law students.

Mock Trials are primarily aimed at promoting confidence in public speaking as well as introducing young people to the justice system and legal profession.

In Scotland, The School Mock Court Case Project runs both primary and secondary school competitions, although has undertaken a number of international competitions. Currently some 100 schools, circa 3,000 students are involved. As of 2021, international schools started entering the programme, with over 16 countries taking part.

=== United States ===
==== Competition framework ====
Competitive mock trial functions in yearly cycles. Each year, a case packet is distributed to all participating schools in late summer to early fall. The case packet is a series of documents including the charges, penal code, stipulations, case law, and jury instructions as well as exhibits and affidavits relevant to the case.

National mock trial teams consist of a minimum of six and a maximum of twelve official members. The size of state mock trial teams can vary; California, for example, allows up to 25 official team members. Each team prepares both sides of the case: prosecution and defense in a criminal trial, plaintiff and defense in a civil action. Each side is composed of two or three attorneys as well as two or three witnesses, all played by members of the team. Teams must be organized into two sides of five to six players for the prosecution/plaintiff and defense. High school mock trial is governed by state bar associations; cases, rules, and competition structure vary from state to state. College mock trial is governed by the American Mock Trial Association (AMTA), meaning that every school uses the same case and is subject to the same rules.

===== High school =====
The mock trial program was started to allow high school students to experience a courtroom setting in a variety of hands-on roles through its proprietary live action role-play system. The mock trials are set up and structured just like a real court and are bound by substantially similar rules. High school competitions can even be held in functional courtrooms or be presided over by real judges. Competing teams are typically coached and scored by practicing attorneys. Each year the case for pre-Nationals competitions alternates between a civil case and a criminal case. Witnesses are typically given gender neutral names such that any student could play any role.

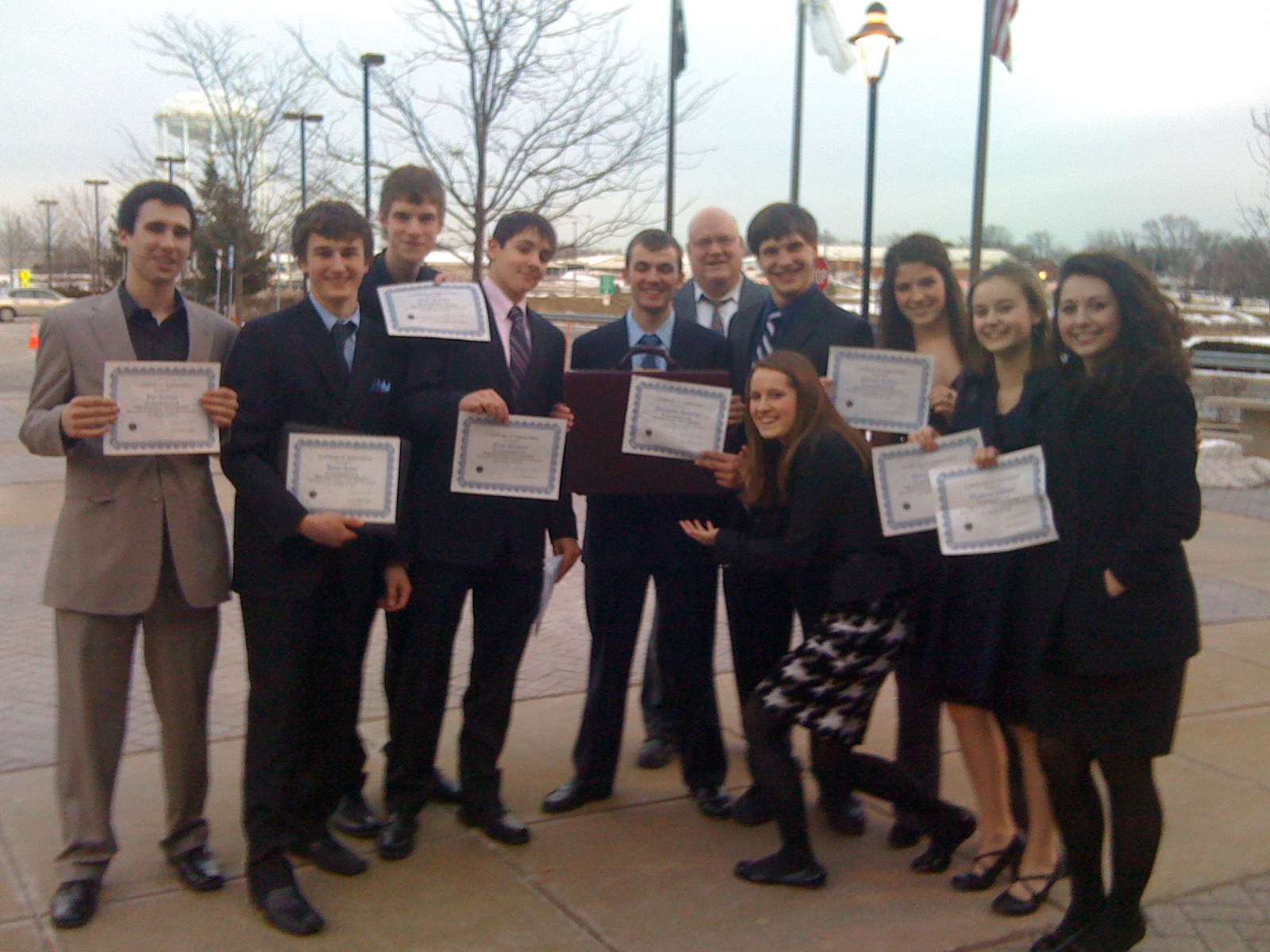
A high school mock trial team in Illinois

The National High School Mock Trial Championship began in 1984. Each year, various participating states around the country take turns hosting the tournament.

Each state has its own case every year that is different from the national case. This means that the winners of each state competition, who move on to nationals, must study and prepare a completely different case in time for the National High School Mock Trial Championship in May. The national competition is governed by National Mock Trial Championship, Inc.

===== College =====
Inter-collegiate mock trial is governed by the American Mock Trial Association. This organization was founded in 1985 by Richard Calkins, the dean of the Drake University Law School. AMTA sponsors regional and national-level competitions, writes and distributes case packets and rules, and keeps a registry of mock trial competitors and alumni. The case packet is generally written and distributed prior to the scholastic year in August, and case changes are made throughout the season, usually in September, December, and finally in February after Regional competitions and prior to the Opening Round of Championships. Since 2015, AMTA has released a new case to be used for the National Championship following the completion of the Opening Round of Championships. Approximately 700 teams from over 400 universities and colleges compete in AMTA tournaments. In total, AMTA provides a forum for over 7,300 undergraduate students each academic year to engage in intercollegiate mock trial competitions across the country.

== In popular culture ==
In the 2020s, a LARP experience called the Jury Experience toured the UK. Court shows, of varying legal authenticity, also remain popular on TV and in entertainment.

== See also ==
- Model Congress
- Model United Nations
- Mock election
- Moot court
