= Gush Etzion =

Israeli settlement cluster in the West Bank

Coordinates: 31°39′28″N 35°07′15″E

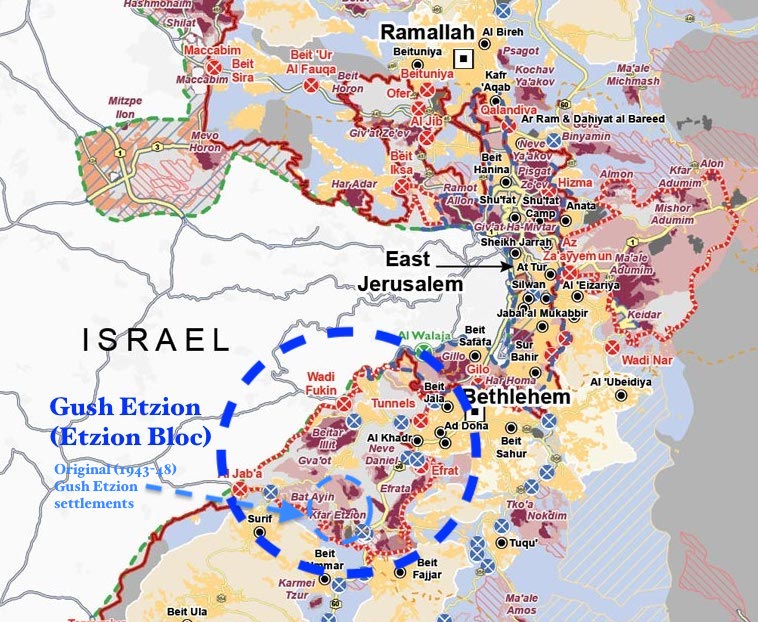
Gush Etzion in the 2018 OCHA OpT map, showing both the modern definition and the area of the original 1943-48 settlements

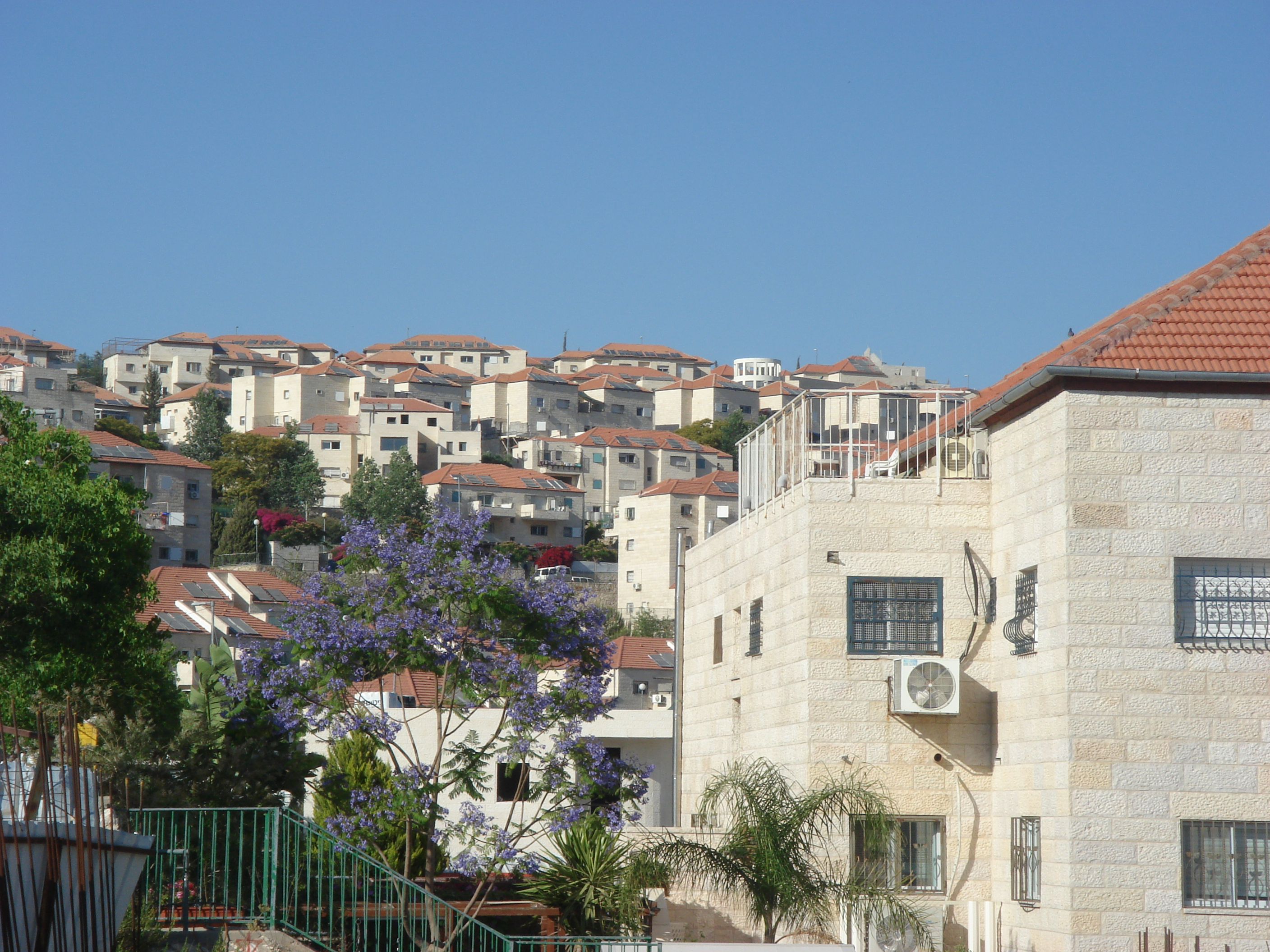
Beitar Illit, the largest city in Gush Etzion, was founded in 1985

Gush Etzion (Hebrew: גּוּשׁ עֶצְיוֹן, lit. Etzion Bloc) is a cluster of Israeli settlements located in the Judaean Mountains, directly south of Jerusalem and Bethlehem in the West Bank. The core group dates back to the 1927 establishment of Migdal Eder, which was depopulated and destroyed after the 1929 Palestine riots; it includes four Jewish agricultural villages that were founded in 1943–1947 and depopulated and destroyed by the Arab Legion during the 1948 Palestine war, after the Kfar Etzion massacre on May 13, 1948, and the subsequent surrender of the other three communities. The area was left outside of Israel with the 1949 armistice lines. These settlements were rebuilt after the 1967 Six-Day War, along with new communities that have expanded the area of the Etzion Bloc. As of 2011, Gush Etzion consisted of 22 settlements with a population of 70,000.

The international community considers Israeli settlements in the West Bank illegal under international law, but Israel disagrees.

== History ==
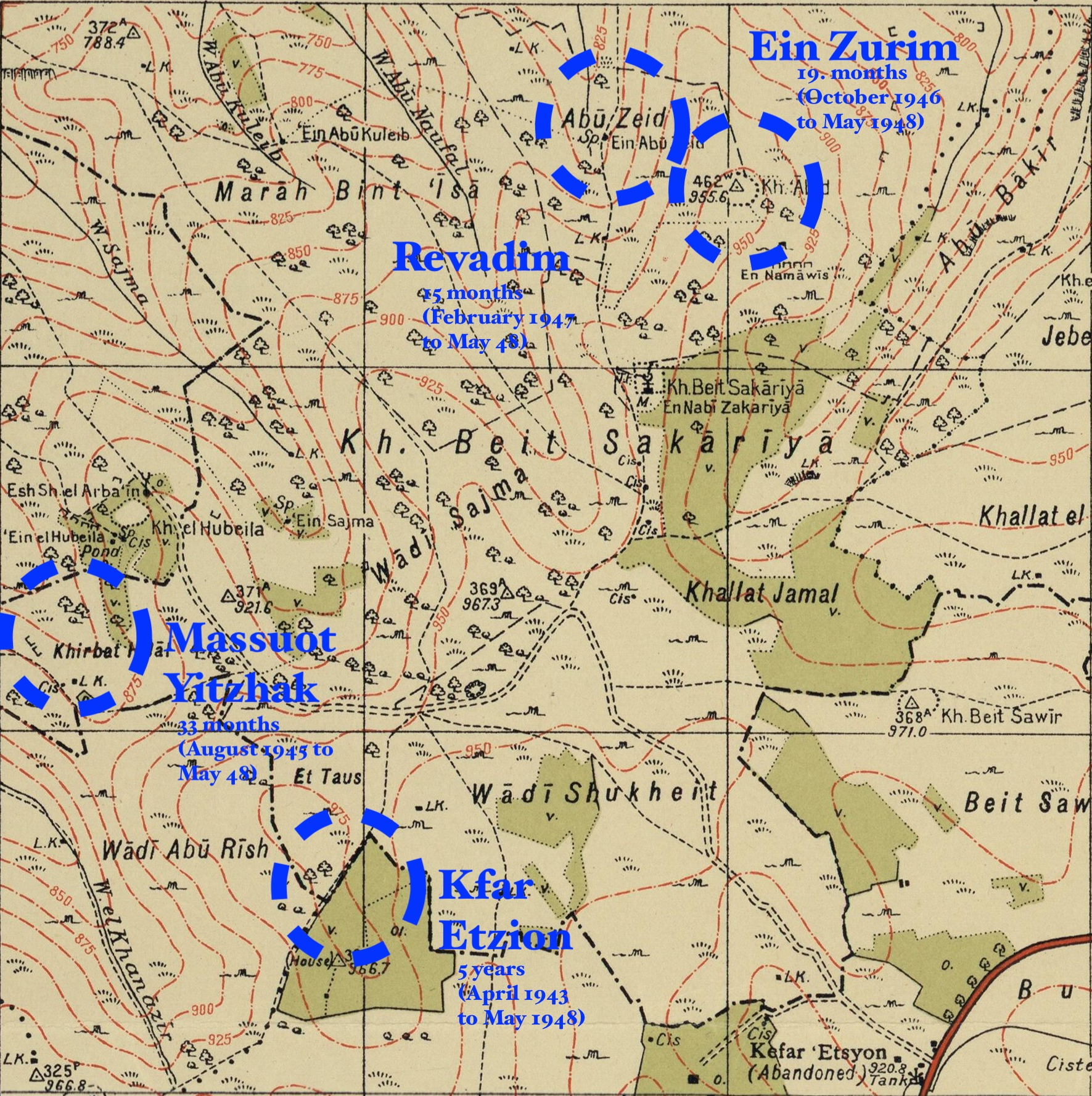
The four kibbutzes of the Gush Etzion Bloc (Kfar Etzion, Ein Tzurim, Massu'ot Yitzhak, Revadim), constructed on land purchased from 1920 to 1930, overlaid on a 1943 Survey of Palestine map; they are shown adjoining the village boundaries of Khirbet Beit Zakariyyah

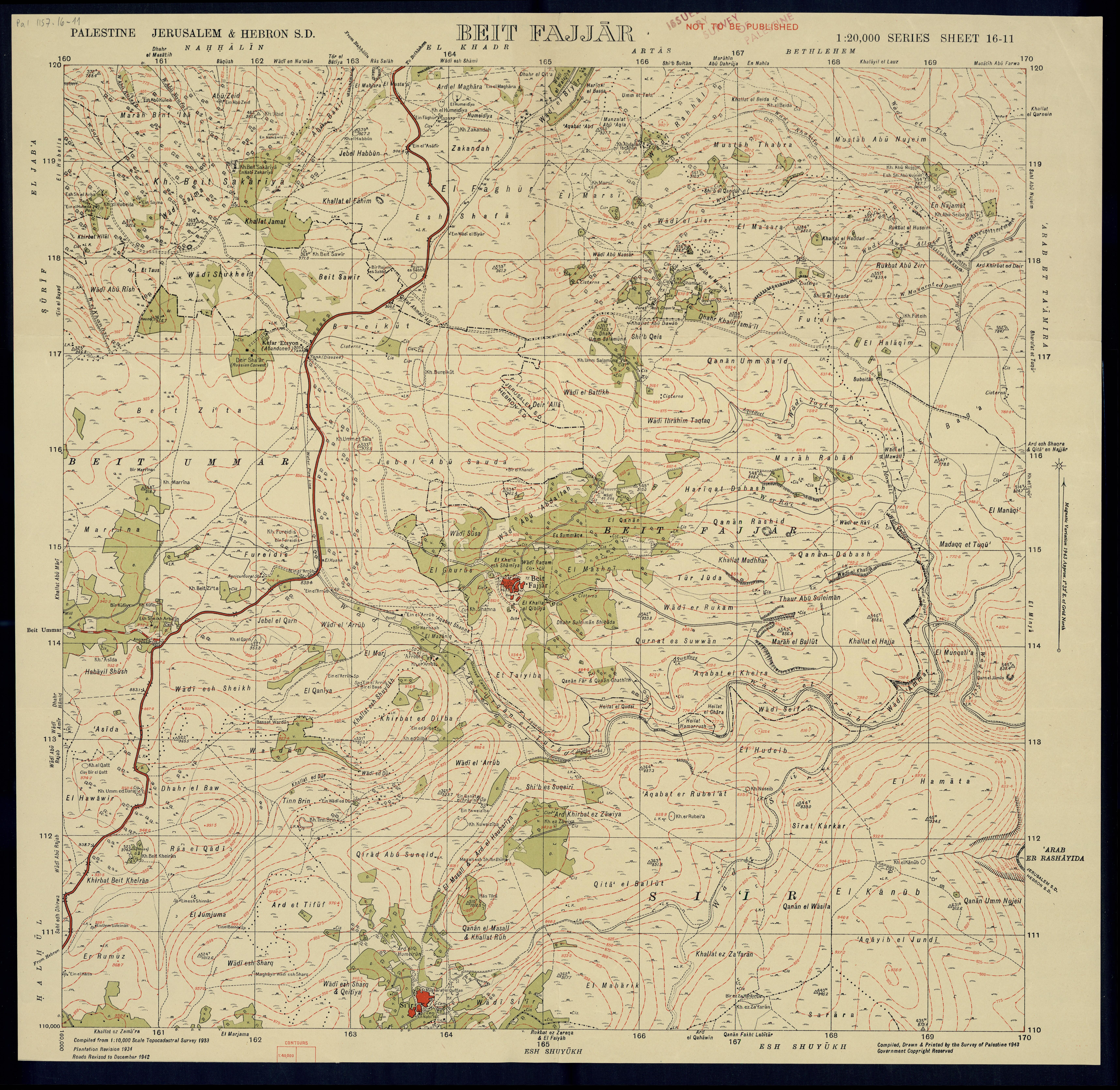
1943 Survey of Palestine map, shortly before the founding of Jewish settlements in the area. "Kefar Etsyon" is shown as abandoned (top left), referring to the 1935-37 failed settlement.

The four core original communities of Gush Etzion were Kfar Etzion (founded in 1943), Massu'ot Yitzhak (1945), Ein Tzurim (1946) and Revadim (1947). The four Jewish communities were built on land acquired from 1920 to 1930. The land of all four communities had been on Jewish-owned property purchased decades earlier and located in the village boundaries of Khirbet Beit Zakariyyah. From November 29, 1947, Kfar Etzion was under siege and cut off from Jerusalem. On May 13, 1948, when the village surrendered, 127 Jewish inhabitants were massacred by local village irregulars, with the possible involvement of the Arab Legion. The other villages surrendered the next day with the International Red Cross and British officials acting as mediators. The homes were plundered and burned; the 350 inhabitants were taken by Arab troops and kept for months in a Jordanian prisoner-of-war camp in Zarqa. In the aftermath of the destruction, a 700-year-old tree known as the "lone oak" that had been located among the four kibbutzes was one of the few items left standing.

The establishment, defense and fall of Gush Etzion have been described as "one of the major episodes of the State of Israel-in-the-making", playing a significant role in Israeli collective memory. The motivation for resettling the region is not so much ideological, political or security-related as symbolic, linked in the Israeli psyche to the massive loss of life (1% of its total population) in the 1947–1949 Palestine war.

=== Settlements in Mandatory Palestine ===
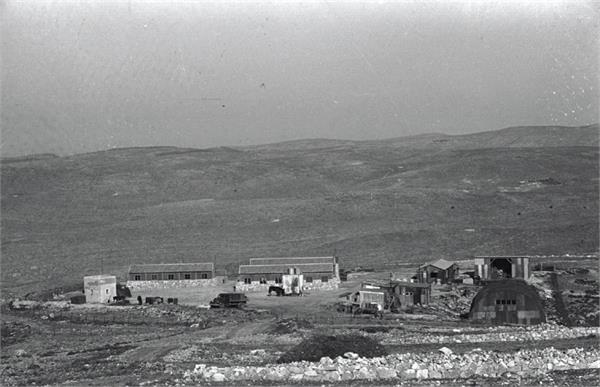
Revadim, December 1947

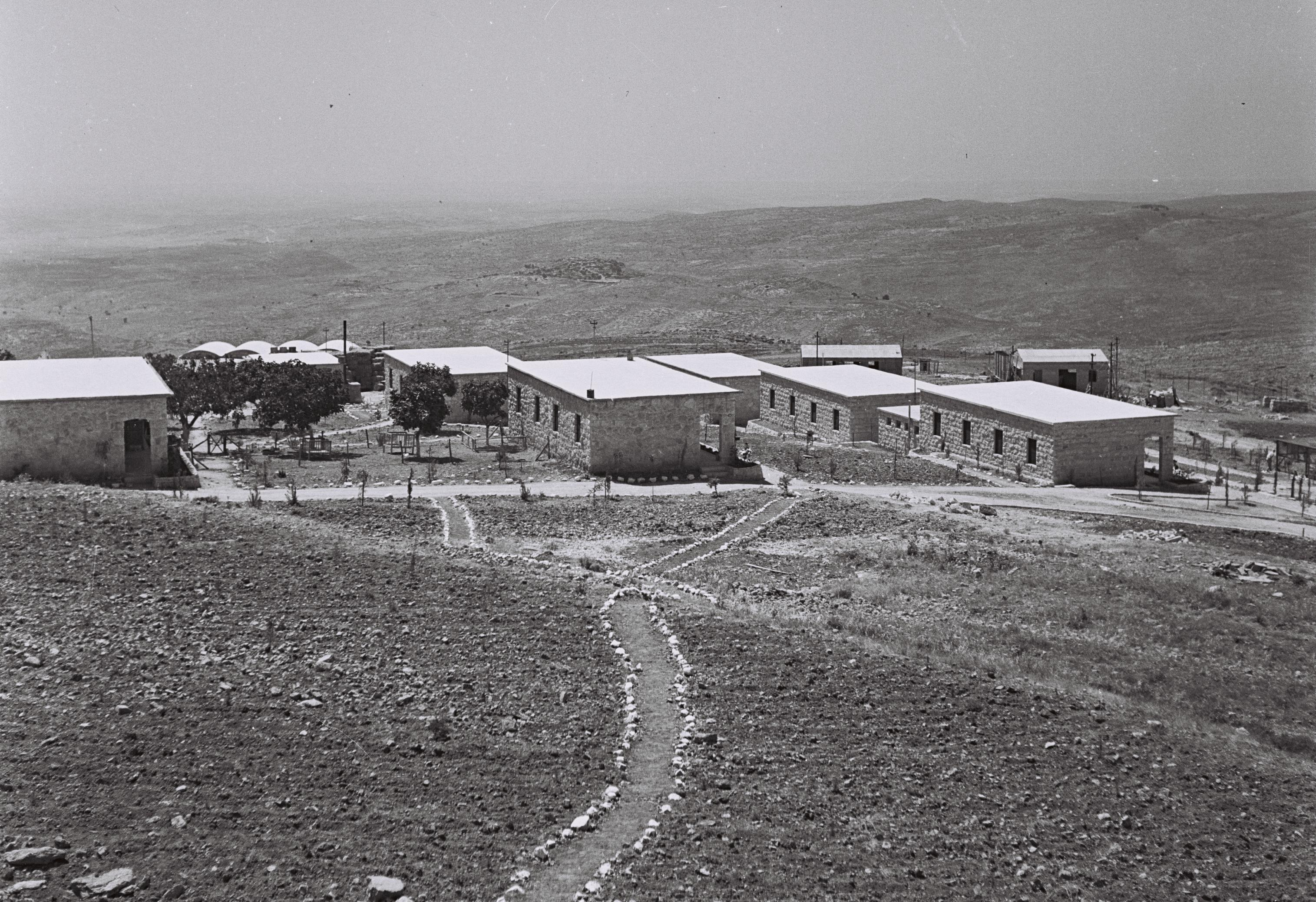
Kibbutz Masu'ot Yitzhak, May 1947

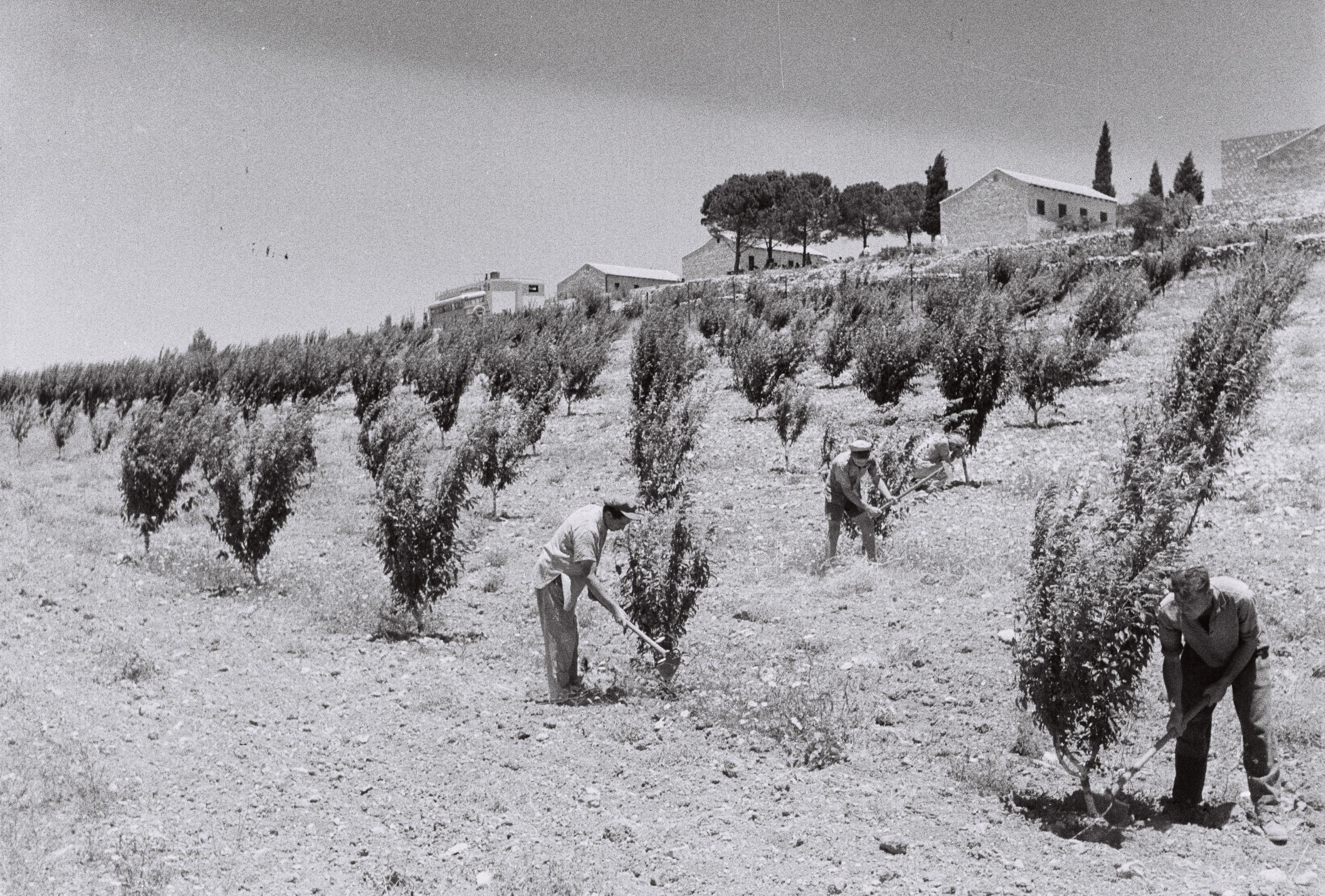
Kfar Etzion, 1947

In 1927, a group of religious Yemenite Jews founded an agricultural village they named Migdal Eder (Hebrew: מִגְדַּל עֵדֶר), based on a biblical quotation (Genesis 35:21). The land had been purchased in 1925 by Zikhron David, a private Jewish land holding company at a site between Bethlehem and Hebron that fell between the zones of influence of the local Arab clans. This early community did not flourish, mainly due to economic hardships on the rocky soil, difficult weather conditions and escalating tension with neighboring Arab communities. Two years later, during the 1929 Palestine riots and recurring hostilities, Migdal Eder was attacked and destroyed. Residents of the neighboring Palestinian village of Beit Ummar sheltered the farmers, but they could not return to their land.

In 1932, a Jewish businessman of German extraction, Shmuel Zvi Holtzmann, provided financial backing for another attempt at resettling the area, through a company named El HaHar ("To the Mountain"). The kibbutz established there in 1935 was named Kfar Etzion, in his honor (the German word Holz means "wood", which is etz עץ in Hebrew). The 1936–1939 Arab revolt made life intolerable for the residents, who returned to Jerusalem in 1937. Most of the structures built by Holtzman and his associates were destroyed by local Arab residents.

The Jewish National Fund organized a third attempt at settlement in 1943 with the re-establishment of Kfar Etzion by members of a religious group called Kvutzat Avraham. Despite the rocky soil, shortage of potable water, harsh winters, and constant threat of attack, this group managed to succeed.

Their isolation was somewhat relieved by the establishment in 1945 of Masu'ot Yitzhak and Ein Tzurim, populated by members of the religious Bnei Akiva movement and Religious Kibbutz Movement. Against the backdrop of an impending struggle for Israeli independence, the secular Hashomer Hatzair movement founded a fourth kibbutz, Revadim. A religious center, Neve Ovadia, was also founded by the bloc's members. By the start of the 1948 Arab–Israeli War, the Etzion bloc numbered 450 residents and stretched over an area of 20,000 dunams (20 km^{2}).

=== Civil war and Arab–Israeli War ===
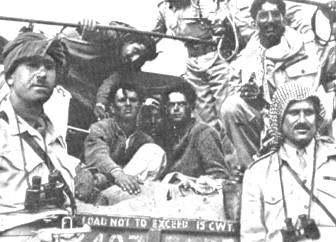
Jewish prisoners in Jordan, after the fall of Gush Etzion, May 1948

On November 29, 1947, the United Nations approved the Partition Plan. Though the bloc fell within the area allotted to a proposed Arab state, the Haganah command decided not to leave, though efforts to keep the communities under Jewish control became increasingly fraught as convoys of defenders and supplies were unable to reach the bloc. Arab hostilities began almost immediately, and travel to Jerusalem became exceedingly difficult. For five months the bloc was besieged, first by Arab irregulars, and then by the Jordanian Arab Legion. Throughout the winter hostilities intensified and several relief convoys from the Haganah in Jerusalem, were destroyed in ambushes and 10 convoy members were killed. For 47 days the armed conflict was intense. In January, the women and children were evacuated to Ratisbonne Monastery with British assistance. An emergency reinforcement convoy put together by the Haganah and attempting to get from Hartuv to Gush Etzion under cover of darkness on January 15-16 was discovered; in the ensuing battle, all members of the Convoy of 35 were massacred. Despite some resupply flights by Piper Cubs out of Tel Aviv, landing onto an improvised airfield, adequate supplies were not getting in.

On March 27, land communication with the Yishuv was severed completely when the Nabi Daniel Convoy was ambushed and 13 fighters were killed on its return journey to Jerusalem. In the following months, Arab irregular forces continued small-scale attacks against the bloc, which the Haganah was able to effectively withstand. At times, the Haganah forces, commanded by Uzi Narkiss, ambushed Arab military convoys—and, according to Morris, also Arab civilian traffic and British military convoys—on the road between Jerusalem and Hebron. The defenders of Gush Etzion and the central command in Jerusalem mulled evacuation, but, although they had very few arms, a decision was made to hold out due to their strategic location as the only Jewish-held position on Jerusalem's southern approach from Hebron.

==== Gush Etzion massacre ====
On May 12, the commander of Kfar Etzion requested from the Central Command in Jerusalem permission to evacuate the kibbutz, but was told to stay. Later in the day, the Arabs captured the Russian Orthodox monastery, which the Haganah used as a perimeter fortress for the Kfar Etzion area, killing twenty-four of its thirty-two defenders. On May 13, a massive attack began, involving parts of two Arab Legion infantry companies, light artillery and local irregular support, attacking from four directions. The kibbutz fell within a day; the Arab forces massacred 127 of the 133 surrendering defenders. The total number of dead during the final assault, including those killed in the massacre and those who committed suicide, was estimated to be between 75 and 250. Only three men and one woman survived. The last message the fighters managed to relay to Jerusalem was “"The Queen has fallen,” which became a tragic symbol of the area’s fall. The following day, the day Israel declared its independence, the three other kibbutzim surrendered. The Arab Legion took 320 persons as prisoners of war and held them in Jordan for a year before releasing them.

In October 1949, Rabbi Shlomo Goren was given permission by Jordanian officials to search the site of the four destroyed Gush Etzion communities. His investigation of the site located many bodies that had not been properly buried, despite the claims of Arab officials that they had been interred three days after the conclusion of the battle. An estimated half of the 100,000 Jewish residents of Jerusalem lined the path of the procession on November 17, 1949, in which the bodies of the victims were buried in a common grave on Mount Herzl, nearly 18 months after they had been killed by Arab forces.

=== Interim period (1949–1967) ===
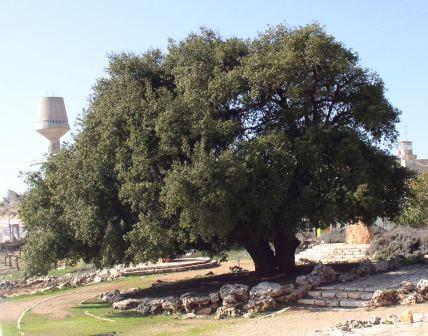
"The lone oak", one of Gush Etzion's symbols

In May 1948, the women and children evacuated from the bloc before the battle were taken to the Ratisbonne Monastery in Jerusalem. In June 1948, when the road to Jerusalem was opened, they were moved to Petah Tikva for two months. The refugees lived at the Netzah Yisrael school until the school year began, later resettling in Giv'at Aliyah, a neighborhood in Jaffa organized like a kibbutz.

Four years later, the returning prisoners of war of the bloc founded Nir Etzion in the Mount Carmel area near Haifa. Nir Etzion sought to accept the majority of the bloc's children into it, but despite wishing to unite in a new place of residence, the issue of joining Nir Etzion was a matter of debate among the children, many of whom joined the Nahal military unit. The survivors of Masu'ot Yitzhak, Ein Tzurim, and Revadim founded their communities anew in Israel proper.

The interim period saw the rise of two movements designed to commemorate the fall of Gush Etzion, through songs, poetry, prose and cultural activities. Both the land of the bloc, and the events that transpired there in the war of 1948, became sacred to the descendants of the original participants. Some compared the story of the yearning to return to the bloc to the story of the Jews yearning to return to the Land of Israel. From 1949 to 1967, some survivors would gather annually on the Israel–Jordan frontier after the Yom HaZikaron / Independence Day ceremony (independence day was one day after the bloc had fallen) and gaze at the giant oak tree ("The lone oak") there in remembrance of what had been. Poems and stories were written that humanized the lone tree. This was criticized by the novelist Haim Be'er, who called the bloc's settlement movements a "fervent cult" and compared them to the Canaanites.

=== Re-establishment ===
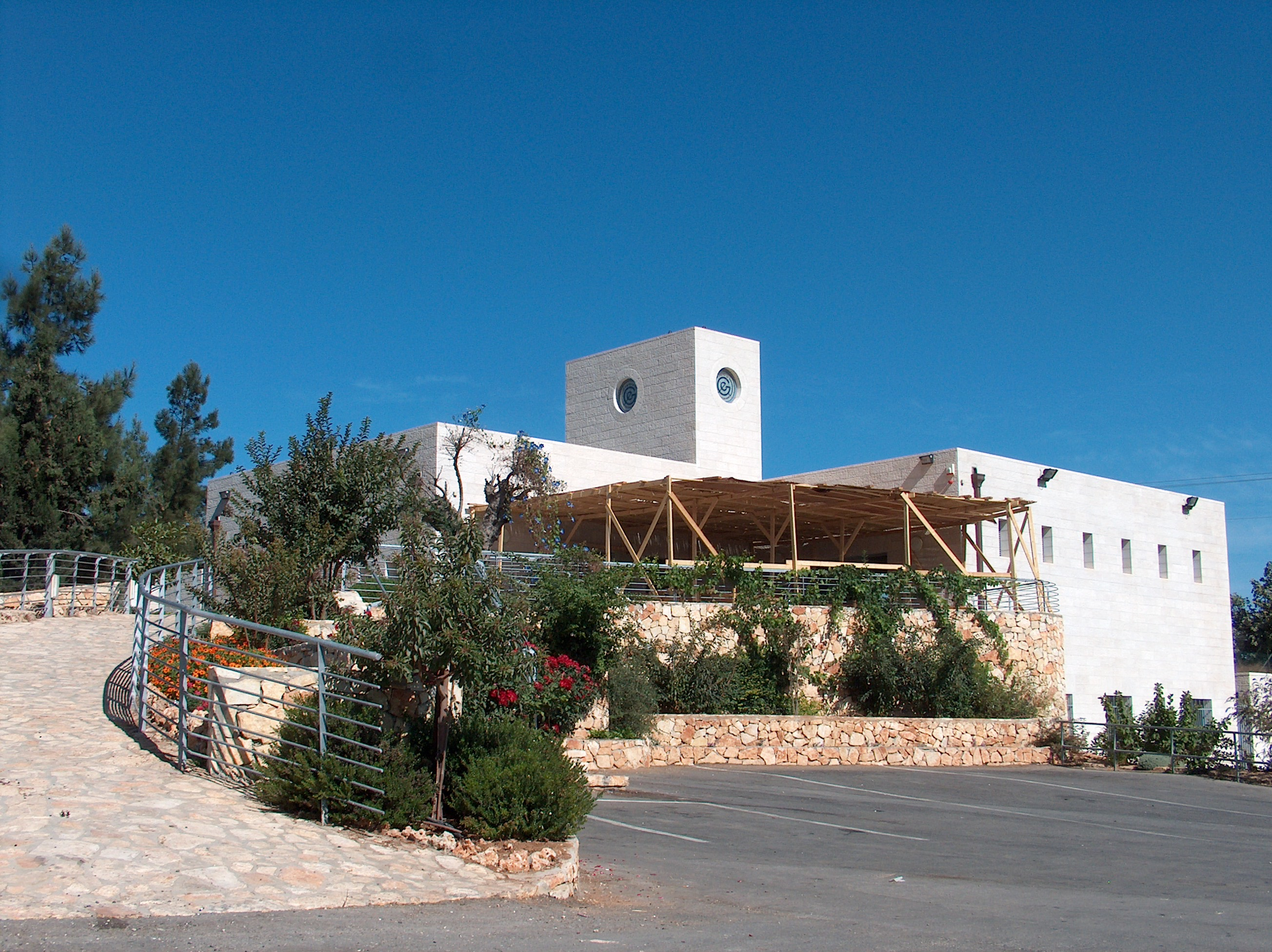
Alon Shvut winery

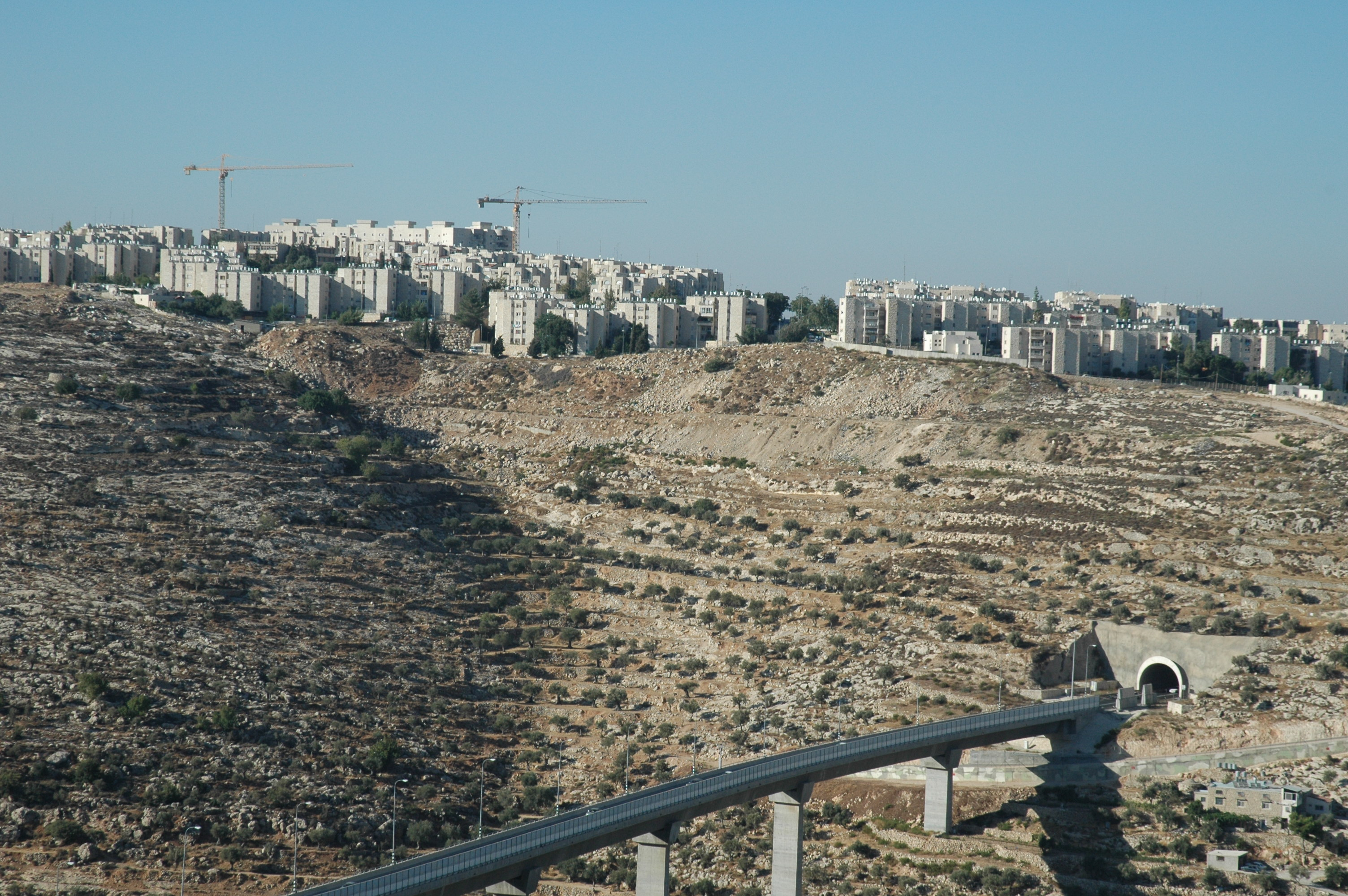
Bridge and tunnel on Highway 60, leading from Jerusalem to Gush Etzion

As a result of the 1967 Six-Day War, Israel controlled the area of the former Etzion Bloc. A loose organisation of Bnei Akiva activists, who later coalesced into Gush Emunim, led by Hanan Porat, whose parents had been evacuated, petitioned Israeli prime minister Levi Eshkol to allow the reestablishment of Kfar Etzion. Among the supporters were Ra'anan Weitz, head of the settlement department in the Jewish Agency; minister of internal affairs Haim-Moshe Shapira; and Michael Hazani of the national religious movement. Supporters of the Allon Plan in the government were also in favor of settling the bloc. Eshkol was finally persuaded to give a green light to the plan. He was not decisive however, and the settlement movement did not immediately begin to build in the entire bloc, but only on the location of Kfar Etzion. Construction began in September, 1967. Since the government initially decided not to establish civilian settlements in the captured territories, the settlement was falsely portrayed as a Nahal outpost. According to Ra'anan Weitz's plan, Kfar Etzion was meant to be one of three settlements in the new bloc, which also included Aviezer. A new middle village would be established on Jewish National Fund land purchased in the 1940s.

Weitz's plan of creating a line of settlements based on territorial continuity, however, had a number of opponents: the descendants of the original residents of the bloc, the settlers on the ground, the Religious Kibbutz Movement, and the Israel Defense Forces. The IDF surveyed the land and decided that, "Kfar Etzion B should be founded near the existing Kfar Etzion, and not near the former Green Line". This eventually was supported by defense minister Moshe Dayan, who envisioned five settlement points in the West Bank, one of them being the Etzion bloc. On September 30, 1968, the government gave permission to create a regional center and Hesder Yeshiva in Kfar Etzion, a major demand of the settlers and the final departure from the continuity plan.

In the same decision, the government appointed a committee for planning the settlement of the bloc. In accordance with the committee's recommendations, Revadim and the settlement of Rosh Tzurim were founded on the former site of Ein Tzurim in July 1969, and Alon Shvut in June 1970. Many other settlements and two municipalities (Efrat and Beitar Illit) have been founded in the area of the historic Etzion bloc, and its name was taken for the greater Gush Etzion Regional Council.

Today there is a museum about the history of Gush Etzion.

== Today ==
Here is a list of communities in modern Gush Etzion.

Name	Founded	Population (EOY 2008)	Type
Alon Shvut	1970	3,400	Community settlement
Bat Ayin	1989	900	Community settlement
Beitar Illit	1985	38,800	Independent municipality
Efrat	1983	8,300	Independent municipality
Elazar	1975	1,706	Community settlement
Karmei Tzur	1984	700	Community settlement
Kedar	1984	960	Community settlement
Kfar Eldad	1994	120	Community settlement
Kfar Etzion	1967	820	Kibbutz
Gevaot	1984	75	Community settlement
Har Gilo	1968	570	Community settlement
Ibei HaNahal	1999	50	Outpost
Ma'ale Amos	1982	270	Community settlement
Ma'ale Rehav'am	2001	40	Outpost
Metzad	1984	380	Community settlement
Migdal Oz	1977	440	Kibbutz
Neve Daniel	1982	1,883	Community settlement
Nokdim	1982	1,300	Community settlement
Pnei Kedem	2000	100	Outpost
Rosh Tzurim	1969	560	Kibbutz
Sde Boaz	2002	90	Outpost
Tekoa	1975	1,600	Community settlement

=== Gush Etzion Junction ===
The entrance to the Gush Etzion bloc is the Gush Etzion Junction, which is located just west of the intersection of Route 60 and Route 367. The junction is located between Efrat and Alon Shvut and very close to Migdal Oz. It is the site of the Gush Etzion visitors' center, a gas station, an automotive repair shop, a Rami Levy discount supermarket, an electronics store, the Gush Etzion Winery (one minute towards Alon Shvut on the north side of the road), a bakery, natural foods store, eyeglass shop, clothing store and pizza / felafel / shawarma stands. Across the street are a nursery and car dealership. The junction is a popular hitchhiking post, both south to Hebron / Be'er Sheva and north to Jerusalem, as well as west towards Bet Shemesh and the coast) which has frequently been the site of attacks by Palestinians against Israeli citizens.

=== 2014 "State land" classifications ===
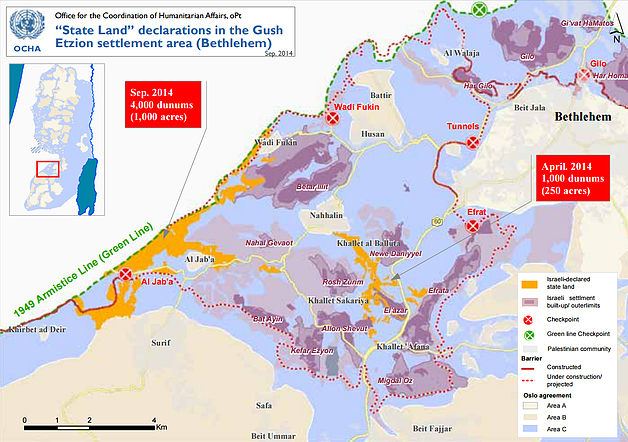
2014 Declarations of "State Land" in Gush Etzion settlement bloc

On 6 April and 25 August 2014, the Israeli Civil Administration declared 1,000 and 3,799 dunums of land respectively in the Bethlehem Governorate within the boundaries of Surif, Nahalin, Husan, Jab'a and Wadi Fukin villages as "state land". According to Peace Now, it was the largest confiscation of Palestinian land in three decades.

The United States responded to the announcement by rebuking Israel for taking measures that were 'counter-productive' to the two-state solution in peace talks. The expropriation was also condemned by the United Nations, the United Kingdom, Egypt, France, Spain, Russia, the European Union, Turkey, Norway, Japan and Amnesty International.

As of September 2014, eight years after approving the 45 kilometres (28 mi) stretch of barrier enclosing Gush Etzion, no progress had been made on it. The reclassified land would be on the Palestinian side of the barrier. On 21 September 2014, the government voted to not reauthorize the barrier in the Gush Etzion area.

== See also ==
- Convoy of 35
- Gush Etzion Convoy
