= Sdeh Bar Farm =

Coordinates: 31°39′38.21″N 35°14′39.68″E

Sdeh Bar Ranch: שדה בר (Hebrew)
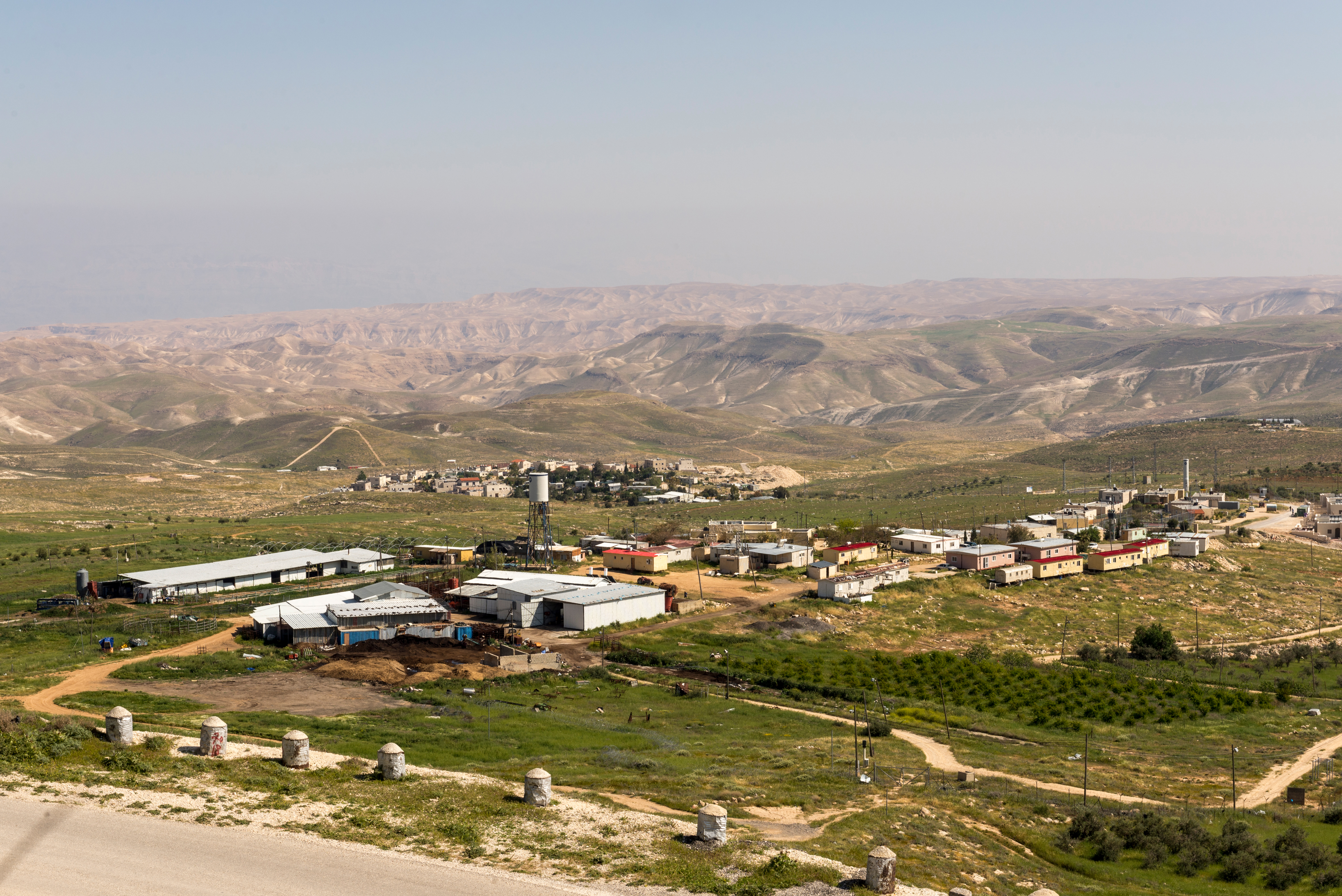
- Sdeh Bar Ranch
- Interactive map of Sdeh Bar Ranch
- Country: Palestine
- District: Judea and Samaria Area
- Region: West Bank
- Population (2011)

Sdeh Bar Ranch (Hebrew: חַוַּת שְׂדֶה בָּר, Havat Sdeh Bar) is a residential children's home dedicated to the rehabilitation of boys at risk ׁׂׂׂ(NGO).

Founded in 1998, the 25-acre ranch provides a unique therapeutic approach, allowing the troubled youth to rebuild their sense of security and re-establish their trust in themselves and their peers, so that they can become contributing members of society.

In addition to professional therapy and education, the ranch utilizes a peer-driven decision-making model that incorporates skill-building activities like farming and horseback riding with creative outlets like music and sports. Unlike other establishments, the boys can continue living on the ranch after turning 18.

The ranch is an Israeli settlement in the West Bank. Originally an Israeli outpost, it has been retroactively designated a suburb of Nokdim, located adjacent to the Palestinian village of Jubbet ad-Dib. Located south of Bethlehem near the foothills of Herodium, it falls under the jurisdiction of Gush Etzion Regional Council.

The international community considers Israeli settlements in the West Bank illegal under international law, but the Israeli government disputes this.

== History ==
Since its establishment, it has dealt with the most troubled youth in Israel, this is what Melamed Aharon, District Court Judge (President of the Juvenile Courts) had to say about the ranch in a court order from 2001: “For the defendant's good fortune, he was admitted about two months ago to the Sde Bar Ranch, where the manager, known to the court as a warm, caring, and exceptional individual, has had many boys come to him in a similar situation to that of the defendant, who, after extended treatment at Sde Bar Ranch, went on to serve in elite IDF units. For the first time in his miserable life, the defendant received warm and loving care, and a very positive change became evident in him, both in his appearance and in his words in court. Therefore, in light of the defendant's age and condition, I do not doubt that a conviction, imprisonment, or a suspended sentence would close the door to his rehabilitation and turn him into a habitual and dangerous criminal. However, holding him in the mentioned institution for an extended period could rehabilitate him. For this reason, without hesitation, I consider it my duty to assist him and hereby order a placement in the institution for 4 years”. Today, the same young man owns a popular bar in Tel Aviv and, in the past, served in an elite unit in the IDF.

Since 2012 a boutique dairy restaurant has been operating at the settlement. Today, the restaurant operates as a social event venue run by the boys, with all the money going directly to them.
