= Tent of Nations =

Coordinates: 31.6777°N 35.1342°E

Tent of Nations is an educational and environmental farm covering 400 dunams next to the village of Nahalin, on a hill top southwest of Bethlehem. The farm has been in Daoud Nassar's family since 1916 when his grandfather purchased the land known as Dahers’ Vineyard. The farm is now surrounded by the Gush Etzion settlement bloc.

The Nassars are a Lutheran Christian Palestinian family.

== History ==
The Nassar family purchased the farm in 1916, during a time when Palestinian Christians were beginning to emigrate. At the time the country was still under Ottoman rule. The property was registered with the British during the 1918–1948 British Mandate in Palestine. When the state of Israel was founded in 1948, Bethlehem fell under Jordanian control—the family has papers from the Jordanians.

After the 1948 Palestine war, when many Christians left the country, Bishara Nassar began visiting nearby villages to sing songs and lead bible study in family homes. He thought music might deepen the faith of Bethlehem's children and encourage them to stay. Bishara's children turned the farm into a center for "peace-building and non-violent resistance" called the Tent of Nations. The family has held workshops on the farm for over 20 years. They run summer camps for local schools to teach Palestinian children about non-violent resistance. Amal Nassar believes these lessons are critical for a generation that has grown up in the refugee camps behind Israel's separation barrier.

The West Bank was occupied by Israel during the Six-Day War in 1967 and in the 1970s Israeli settlers began to build on the hilltops of the West Bank. The hilltops around the Nassar family's farm became the Jewish settlements of Neve Daniel, Beitar Illit, Alon Shvut and Elazar. These settlements are part of the Gush Etzion settlement bloc.

== Ownership dispute ==
The family owns the 100-acre farm since 1916 and registered it during the British Mandate (1924–25). It was declared state land by Israel in 1991 but in 2005 the Israeli high court allowed Nassar to begin and register the land.

On May 19, 2014 the IDF bulldozed Dahar Nassar's orchard of 1,500 fruit trees. The Nassar family had filed an appeal on May 12 in response to a notice from the Israeli Civil Administration. One week later, without a ruling from the appeal court, the land was bulldozed. There was significant international outcry from the Presbyterian Church. The Presbyterian Church was accused of being motivated by "traditional antisemitism" in an article published in the conservative American Jewish magazine Commentary. CAMERA, the Committee for Accuracy in Middle East Reporting in America, said Christian activists were "passing on anti-Israel propaganda offered to them by Palestinian Christians in the West Bank as the gospel fact."

== International support ==
The Tent of Nations project is supported by associations called "Tent of Nations friends" chartered in four countries: Sweden, Switzerland, United States and United Kingdom.
