= Tzur Shalem =

Coordinates: 31.6061577°N 35.0961215°E

Tzur Shalem is an Israeli outpost attached to the Israeli settlement of Karmei Tzur in The Gush Etzion settlement bloc in the West Bank. The outpost is under the jurisdiction of the Gush Etzion Regional Council. The international community considers Israeli settlements in the West Bank illegal under international law, but the Israeli government disputes this.

Tzur Shalem was founded in March 2001 in memory of Shmuel Gillis, a senior hematologist at Hadassah Medical Center in Jerusalem who lived in Karmei Tzur. Dr. Gillis was killed by Palestinians earlier in 2001.

The outpost, which is just 100 metres (330 ft) from its parent community of Karmei Tzur, started with 6 caravans. By the summer of 2004 it had grown to 22 caravans.

In June 2002 Palestinians killed Eyal and Yael Sorek and army reservist Shalom Mordechai in Tzur Shalem. The attack called the legitimacy of outposts in general into question in Israel. Avraham Rotem, a researcher at the Begin-Sadat Center for Strategic Studies, said that a settlement of even five families would require 60 to 80 soldiers along with a vast amount of infrastructure in order to defend it. Rotem claimed that "[a]nything can be defended. But the question is if it is smart, and whether the IDF needs this on its head, and the answer to that question is no. These tiny settlements are an albatross on the neck of the IDF."
