= Jubbet ad-Dib =

- Local Development Committee

Arabic transcription(s)
  - Arabic: جبة الذيب
  - Latin: Jubbet adh-Dhib (official); Jub al-Dib (unofficial)
- Location of Jubbet ad-Dib within Palestine
- Coordinates: 31°39′48″N 35°14′54″E
- Palestine grid: 173/119
- State: State of Palestine
- Governorate: Bethlehem
- Founded: 1929

Government
  - Type: Local Development Committee
  - Head of Municipality: Riad Khamis

Area
  - Total: 0.4 km^{2} (0.15 sq mi)

Population (2017)
  - Total: 144
  - Density: 360/km^{2} (930/sq mi)
- Name meaning: "the Well of Wolves"

Jubbet ad-Dib (Arabic: جبة الذيب, also spelled Jubbet adh-Dhib) is a small Palestinian village in the central West Bank, part of the Bethlehem Governorate. It is located about 6.5 kilometers southeast of Bethlehem and is just east of the Palestinian town of Jannatah and north of the Israeli settlement Kfar Eldad. Its lands border on the settlement of Havat Sdeh Bar. It had a population of 144 according to the 2017 census by the Palestinian Central Bureau of Statistics (PCBS). Jubbet ad-Dib has a total land area of 402 dunams, of which 8 constitute as built-up area, and is situated at an altitude of 628 meters above sea level.

== History ==
The village was established in 1929 by Bedouin Arabs who had previously lived and grazed their livestock there. The inhabitants were part of the Bani Harb tribal confederation based in the Arabian Peninsula. The village name translates as "the Well of the Wolves." Currently, Jubbet ad-Dib's population mostly belong to one clan, al-Wahsh. There is one mosque in the village, the Hamza Bin Abd al-Muttalib Mosque.

The men of the village mainly work as construction labourers in Israel, and commuting through the Separation fence is time consuming, -rising at 3 a.m. and returning only in the evening, so that they are frequently absent during the working week. Tired of waiting the women eventually organized their own solution. In 2002 the Palestinian National Authority (PNA) established a five-member local development committee to administer Jubbet adh-Dhib. The PNA appoints all members and there is no headquarters for the committee in the village itself. In recent years the village has relied on the leadership of the Women's Committee, which has successfully found international and donors of a school, a school bus, a solar heating system, and solar electricity, infrastructure which has also benefited from the aid and assistance of local NGOs, such as the Israel-Palestinian Comet-ME since 2016, and the Bimkom group of Israeli planners, who helped map the village confines.

== Economy and infrastructure ==
About 70% of Jubbet ad-Dib's employed workforce work in the Israeli labor market. The remainder largely work in agriculture. The unemployment rate in 2008 was 16%. According to one elderly woman's memory, the villagers first asked to be linked up to a power grid in the 1970s, but in the end it required 40 years to get a connection. According to a report by Human Rights Watch (HRW), Jubbet ad-Dib's local administration first applied to be connected to the Israeli electricity grid in 1988. Israeli authorities repeatedly denied the village electricity, as the village is under Israeli administrative control in "Area C." The village did not have paved roads connecting it to other Palestinian occupied localities. Children were required to walk down muddy tracks to get to a nearby school. Residents cannot afford vehicles; most residents who need services walk for transportation. By 2008, there were no schools or government institutions in the village, most services were provided by nearby towns such as Beit Ta'mir and Za'atara.

The Netherlands eventually provided the funds for the solar power system. Nine months after its installation, the Israel military government, together with the IDF confiscated the panels in late June 2017 on the grounds that they had been installed without an Israeli permit. The loss of the equipment, consisting of 96 solar panels and electronic equipment, resulted in the loss of electricity for the 30 families living in the village. The original donor, the Netherlands government, protested the confiscation and, after three months, in October, the equipment was returned. The Dutch later said they would continue projects to help Palestinians, with or without Israeli permission.

On 2a2 August 2017, six EU-donated steel cabins serving as a school in the area were demolished or removed along with school equipment by Israeli authorities on the day before school term started. This, and other destruction of Palestinian educational facilities by Israel, were condemned by France. The school served 64 villager children, and a replacement structure was erected within days, successfully, by Bethlehem activists, despite an incursion by Israeli troops who attempted to use tear gas to disperse the workers.

The model the women have developed has improved women's status in the village, and they are frequently called on for advice on broader regional problems of development.

== See also ==
- Herodium
