= Yosef Zvi Rimon =

Israeli rabbi

Rabbi Yosef Zvi Rimon יוסף צבי רימון
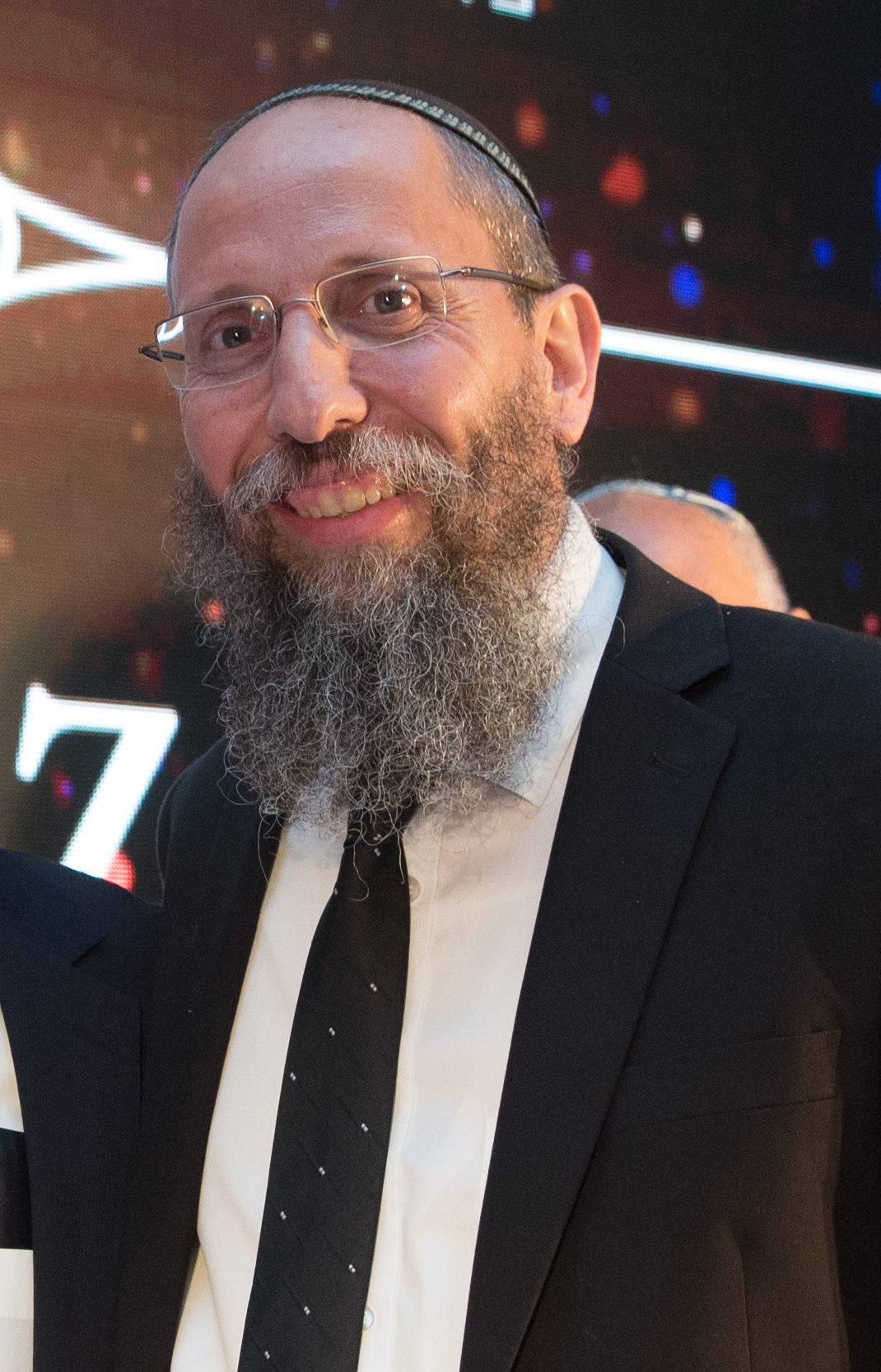

Personal life
- Born: 1968 (age 57–58) England
- Spouse: Sharon Blumenzweig
- Children: 8
- Parent(s): David and Rita Rimon
- Education: Yeshivat Har Etzion

Religious life
- Religion: Judaism
- Denomination: Orthodox Judaism

Jewish leader
- Yeshiva: Yeshivat Har Etzion
- Residence: Alon Shevut

Yosef Zvi Rimon (Hebrew: יוסף צבי רימון רב; born January 18, 1968) is an Israeli Religious Zionist who is a rabbi of the Gush Etzion Regional Council and the Ashkenazi Synagogue of Alon Shvut Darom. He is rosh yeshiva (dean) of the Jerusalem College of Technology (Machon Lev) and a Rosh Kollel at Yeshivat Har Etzion.

Rimon was born in England to Rita and David Rimon, the son of the poet Yosef Zvi Rimon (he), after whom he is named, and grew up in Tel Aviv. He attended Yeshivat Har Etzion. He was in a tank unit in Israel's 188th Armored Brigade.

Rimon was elected as Gush Etzion’s first chief rabbi and rabbi of the Gush Etzion Regional Council in 2021. As of March 2024 he was president of the World Mizrachi Movement.

== Awards and recognition ==
- Moskowitz Prize for Zionism (2014)
- The Marcus Katz Prize (he) (2018)
