= Karmei Tzur =

Israeli settlement in the West Bank

Karmei Tzur: כַּרְמֵי צוּר (Hebrew)
- Etymology: Vineyards of Rock
- Location within the Southern West Bank
- Coordinates: 31°36′33″N 35°6′5″E
- Country: Palestine
- District: Judea and Samaria Area
- Council: Gush Etzion
- Region: West Bank
- Affiliation: Hapoel HaMizrachi
- Founded: 1984
- Founder: Residents of Alon Shvut
- Population (2024): 987
- Website: www.carmatz.com

Karmei Tzur, or Carmei Tzur (Hebrew: כַּרְמֵי צוּר) is an Israeli settlement organized as a community settlement in the West Bank located north of Hebron in the Judean hills between the Palestinian towns of Beit Ummar and Halhul. The National Religious community falls under the jurisdiction of Gush Etzion Regional Council. Under the terms of the Oslo Accords of 1993 between Israel and the Palestine Liberation Organization, Karmei Tzur was designated Area "C" under full Israeli civil and security control. In 2024 it had a population of 987.

The international community considers Israeli settlements in the West Bank illegal under international law, but the Israeli government disputes this.

According to a Peace Now report from 2006, 27% of the land on which Karmei Tzur is built is privately owned, all or most of it by Palestinians. According to Israeli law, settlements on privately owned Palestinian land are illegal.

== History ==
Karmei Tzur, meaning "Vineyards (or Olive Groves) of Rock" or "Stalwart Vineyards", was established in 1984 by a group of students from the Har Etzion Yeshiva in Alon Shvut, and was named after the nearby Hasmonean and Biblical place of Beth-Zur

== Geography ==
Karmei Tzur is situated east of the Israeli West Bank barrier, 8.3 kilometers from the Green line in the Judean hills north of Hebron, 22 kilometers from Jerusalem. The settlement has a total area of about 420.000 square meters.

== Population ==
There are about 200 families living in the settlement with more than 1,000 people in total. This includes 13 families living in the adjacent Tzur Shalem outpost and eight immigrant families of Inca Jews from Trujillo, Peru, who have been housed there as part of an absorption program. The settlement is home to Yeshiva students, educators, academics, army officers, traders, and doctors. Most of the residents work in Gush Etzion, Kiryat Arba, or Jerusalem.

== Education ==
Local children are educated within the settlement until they reach school age. School children are transported to schools in the centre of Gush Etzion. There is a wide variety of after school activities provided in the settlement.

== Outposts ==
Karmei Tzur has an outpost, Tzur Shalem, which is also considered illegal under Israeli law. It was established in 2001 in memory of Dr. Shmuel Gillis, a senior physician at the Hadassah Medical Center and resident of Karmei Tzur of English origins who was killed when Palestinians shot him while driving home on 1 February 2001 during the Second Intifada. The name was chosen by Gillis′ widow. “Shalem”, meaning “whole”, shares some of the letters of Gillis′ first name “Shmuel”, and the word “tzur”, meaning “rock”, is one of the names for God and also symbolizes strength and steadfastness. The outpost with more than twenty caravans and 13 families is located to the west of Karmei Tzur and has views of the Shephelah Region.

== Israeli-Palestinian conflict ==
In February 2001, Dr. Shmuel Gillis (42) of Karmei Tzur was shot eleven times by Palestinian gunmen while driving. He died instantly. In June 2002 Hamas militants, possibly assisted by Islamic Jihad men, infiltrated the Tzur Shalem outpost and killed Ayal Sorek (23) and his 9-month-pregnant wife Yael (24) along with reserve soldier Shalom Mordechai (35) from Nahariya.

As B'Tselem reports, in October 2011, settlers from Karmei Tzur threw stones at Palestinians demonstrating against what they claimed was the seizure of their primarily privately owned land forming the special security area (SSA) surrounding the settlement, which settlers can enter freely, while the Palestinian landowners must obtain special permits to enter. A Palestinian photographer who was filming the events was injured, while apparently security officials from the settlement and Israeli soldiers did not intervene.

In February 2012, Karmei Tzur resident Zehava Weiss, a teacher, was attacked with stones and bricks near the Palestinian town Beit Ummar while driving to Karmei Tzur. Although her car was armored, the windshield was shattered and the exterior was dented in several places. According to her, similar attacks are a near daily occurrence. Following the incident, two suspects were arrested near the Palestinian town of Al-Khader.

The settlement is home to Reuven Ben-Uliel, the father of the convicted attacker in the Duma arson attack, and the rabbi of Karmei Tzur. In 2020, Amiram Ben-Uliel was convicted by an Israeli court for the murder of three people, two other attempted murders, three counts of arson and of conspiring to commit a racially motivated crime as part of a "terrorist act". The Ben-Uliel family released a statement supporting their son and protesting his innocence.
