= Jerusalem Literary Review =

Israeli Russophone literary magazine

The Jerusalem Literary Review, also translated as Jerusalem Magazine or Jerusalem Journal (Russian: Иерусалимский журнал, romanized: Ierusalimsky Zhurnal, Hebrew: כתב עת ירושלםי) was a magazine of modern Israeli literature in Russian. Headquartered in Jerusalem, it was issued during 1999-2022, with two later irregular issues. His editor-in-chief was Igor Bialsky.

Later, Новый Иерусалимский журнал (כתב העת ירושלים החדש, New Jerusalem Magazine, New Jerusalem Journal) was started as a continuation, with an expanded scope. It is printed biannually by a non-profit association "Tachanat Ruah", Tekoa, also available onine.
