= Ma'ale Rehav'am =

Ma'ale Rehav'am: מַעֲלֶה רְחַבְעָם (Hebrew)
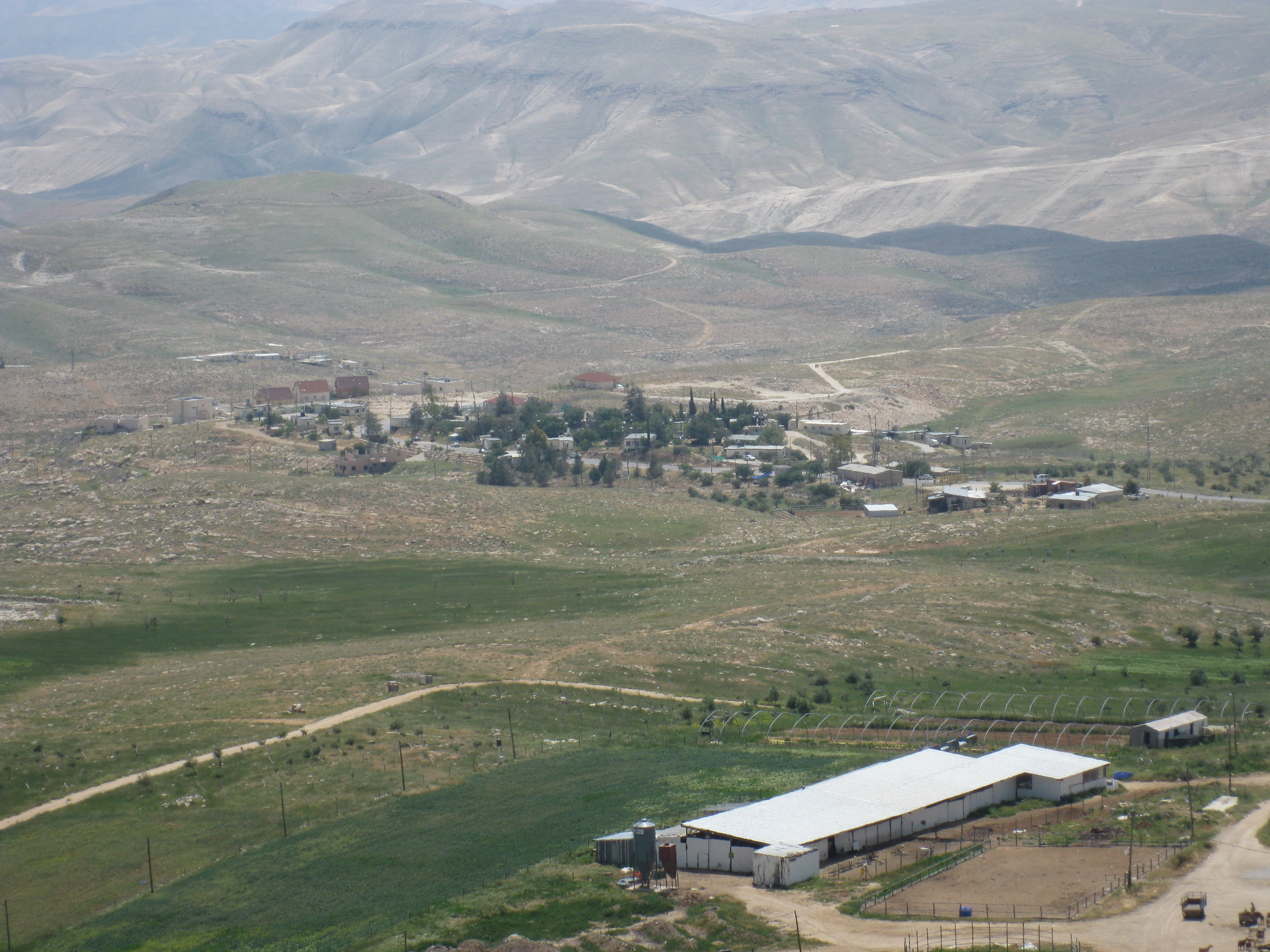
- View from Herodium on Ma'ale Rehav'am

- Location within the Southern West Bank
- Coordinates: 31°38′51″N 35°15′29″E
- Country: Palestine
- District: Judea and Samaria Area
- Council: Gush Etzion
- Region: West Bank
- Founded: 2001
- Founder: Amana
- Population (2011)
- Website: Maaleh Rehavam on the Gush Etzion website

Ma'ale Rehav'am (Hebrew: מַעֲלֶה רְחַבְעָם) is an Israeli outpost in the West Bank, located south of Bethlehem and northeast of Hebron in the northeastern Judean Mountains on Road 3698 in the eastern Etzion bloc. Its mother community, the settlement of Nokdim is administrated by the Gush Etzion Regional Council, which lists Ma'ale Rehav'am as a separate "community" on its official website.

The international community considers Israeli settlements in the West Bank illegal under international law, but the Israeli government disputes this. Outposts like Ma'ale Rehav'am, on the other hand, are considered illegal even under Israeli law. Ma'ale Rehav'am was among the outposts the Israeli government pledged to remove under the 2003 Road map for peace. According to IDF sources, demolition orders have been issued for most of the houses, but development has continued.

== History ==
With assistance from Amana, Ma'ale Rehav'am was founded in 2001 after, and in reaction to, the assassination of Rehavam Zeevi for whom it is named, who was an ardent supporter of settlements in the occupied territories. Ma'ale Rehav'am was built on land that was declared state land belonging to Nokdim and originally zoned for that purpose. It is located inside an area designated as a nature preserve.

On 16 May 2006, Ma'ariv ran an article claiming that Ma'ale Rehav'am was built on private Palestinian land. Residents filed a suit for slander, and the Jerusalem court ruled on 25 June 2009 that Maariv had to publish a correction and compensate the residents with 1,000 shekels each.

As its mother settlement Nokdim, the small 'mixed' community of about thirty families (February 2013) stands out in that non-observant and religiously observant Jewish families live together. In general, while large Israeli towns and cities have heterogeneous populations, small communities usually are either homogeneous non-religious or religious. The community is based on the ecovillage model which has taken shape in olive and almond groves, a muscat grape vineyard, and an orchard growing thirty-five different fruit varieties. Most residents live in mobile homes, but there also are a few permanent structures.

On 13 February 2013, six or nine, depending on the sources, mobile homes were torn down in Ma'ale Rehav'am before the High Court of Justice issued a temporary injunction forbidding the Israeli Civil Administration from demolishing homes in the outpost. In the riots following the demolition, several protesters were arrested. In a so-called "price tag" attack, the ancient Muslim Mamilla cemetery in west Jerusalem was vandalized the following day, apparently in retaliation over the demolitions in Ma'ale Rehav'am. In May 2014, the Israeli government decided to evacuate ten buildings in the settlement while giving Israeli authorization to the remainder.
