= Kfar Eldad =

Israeli settlement

Kfar Eldad: כְּפַר אֶלְדָּד (Hebrew)
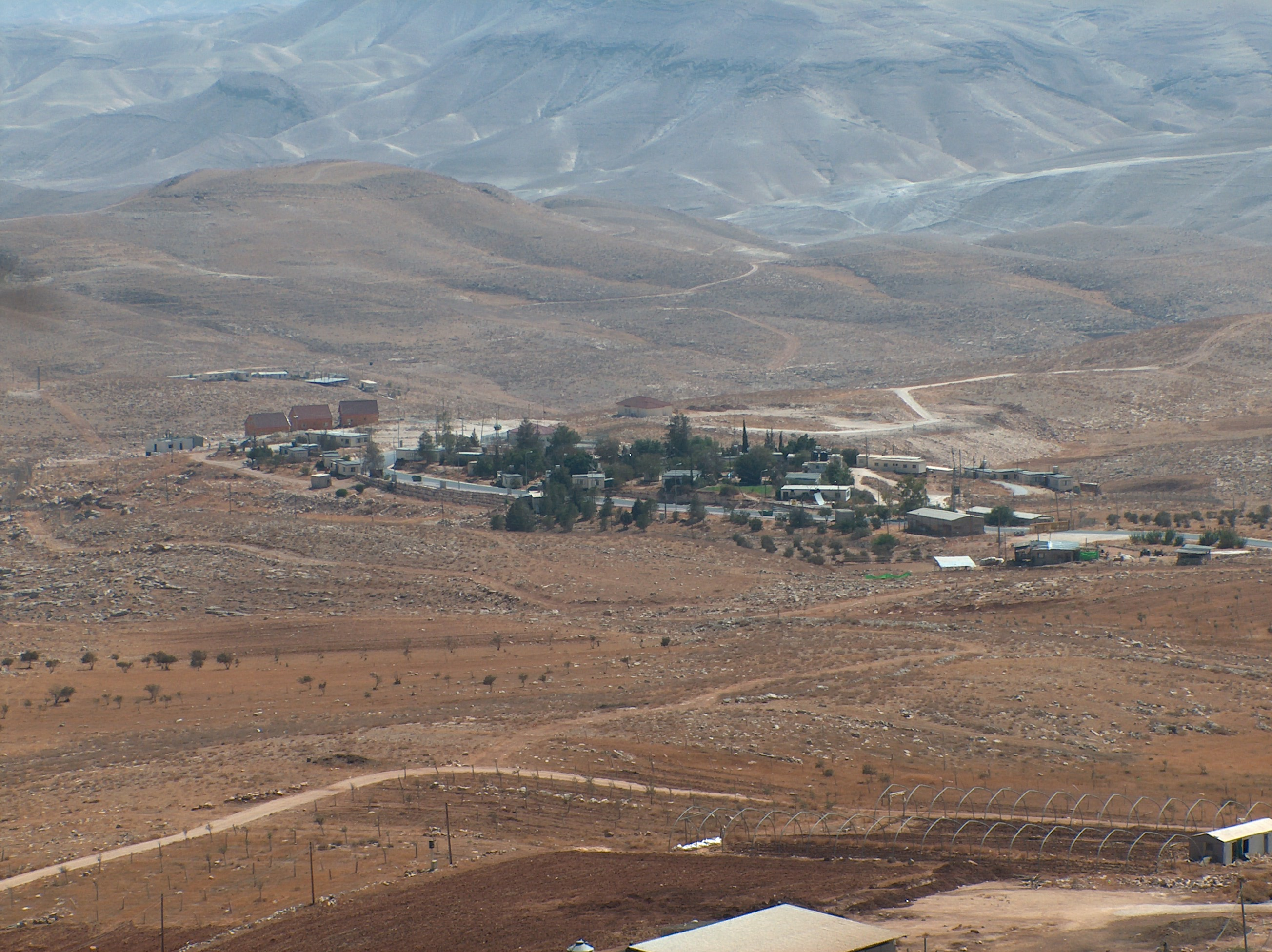
- View of Kfar Eldad, the outpost of Maale Rehav'am is on the left.

- Location within the Southern West Bank
- Coordinates: 31°39′14″N 35°15′3″E
- Country: Palestine
- Council: Gush Etzion
- Region: West Bank
- Founded: 1982
- Founder: Residents of Nokdim

Kfar Eldad (Hebrew: כְּפַר אֶלְדָּד) is an Israeli settlement organised as a community settlement in the West Bank, south of Jerusalem. Kfar Eldad is administered by the Gush Etzion Regional Council. The settlement is in the vicinity of Herodium and overlooks the Judean Desert.

The international community considers Israeli settlements in the West Bank illegal under international law, but the Israeli government disputes this.

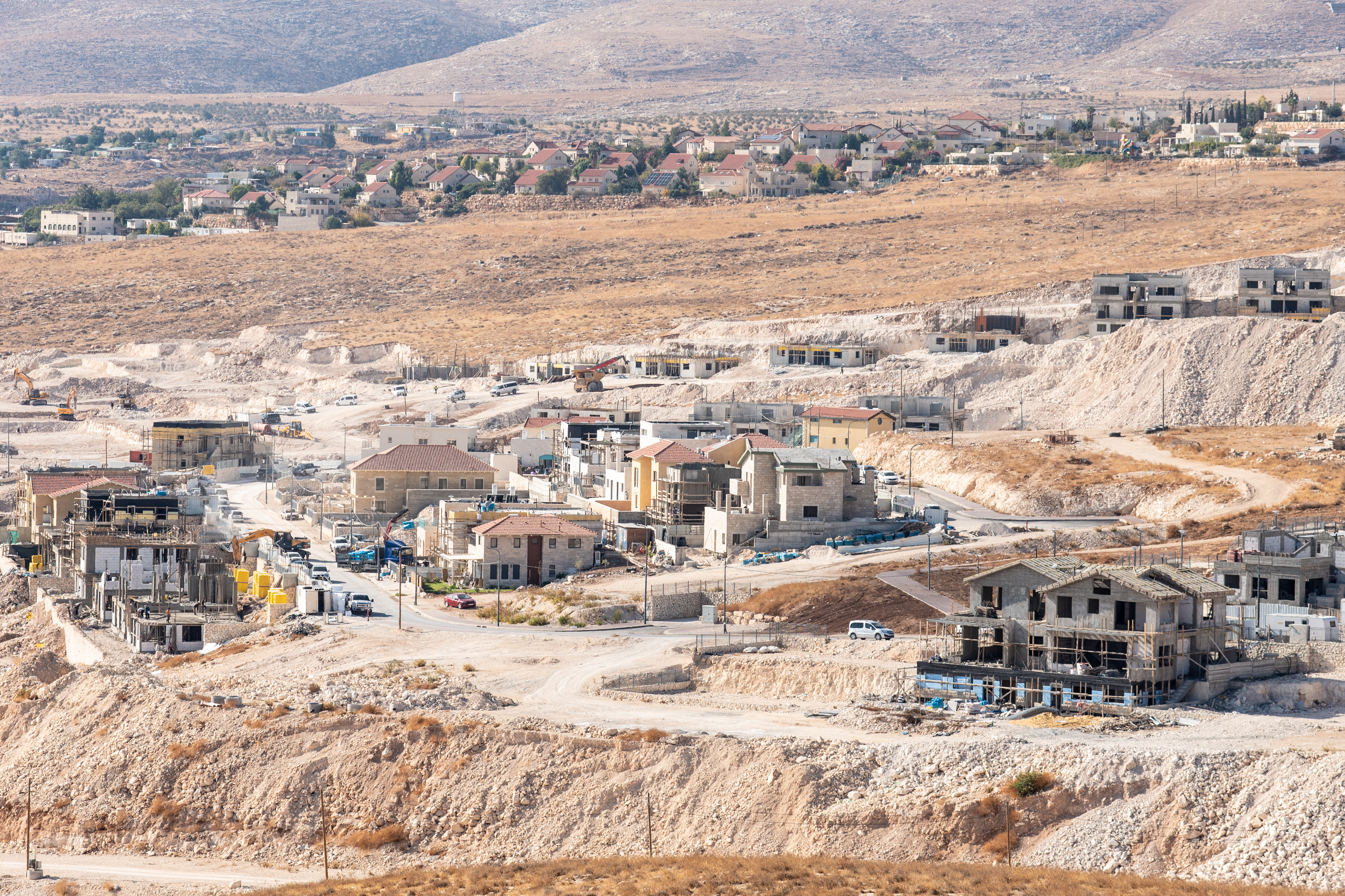
Construction of homes in 2019

== History ==
Kfar Eldad is named after Israel Eldad, a Lehi member and Israeli philosopher. The population is made up of both native born Israelis and Russian immigrants. Secular and religious people live side by side. The settlement was established by families from Nokdim and served as a temporary housing site prior to that town's construction.

In 2012, the population consisted of 80 families.

== Notable people ==
- Ze'ev Elkin
