= Mishmeret Yesha =

Israeli organization who trains Israeli settlers to guard their outposts and settlements

- Founded: 1988
- Founder: Yisrael Danziger
- Region served: Israel and the West Bank
- Volunteers: 4,000
- Website: Mishmeret Yesha

Mishmeret Yesha (Hebrew: משמרת יש"ע) is an Israeli organization that trains Israeli settlers in counterterrorism techniques and the use of weapons to guard Israeli outposts and settlements against attacks from Palestinian terrorism. It was founded in 1988 and its name means "Guardians of Yesha." Yisrael Danziger is head of operations for the organization and one of its three founders.

== Principles ==
Mishmeret Yesha lists five principles that it says defines the organization.

- "The Torah of Israel and the words of the prophets are the ideological basis for the Nation of Israel. Any and all national decisions will be based on this and only this ideology."
- "Jerusalem is the eternal capital of Israel and Mt. Moriah, site of the Third Temple to be built in our day."
- "Every grain of sand and every stone in the Land of Israel are holy to the Nation of Israel. No authority is allowed to relinquish any portion of the land."
- "The political and spiritual leadership of the Nation of Israel must be comprised of people possessing vision, absolute faith and uncompromising integrity."
- "The only home for the Nation of Israel is the Land of Israel. The security and strength of the Nation of Israel is dependent on the military, political and economic independence of Israel, which will be achieved via the ingathering of the exiles and the removal of all hostile elements from the land."

== Operations ==
Mishmeret Yesha started as an ad hoc legal counsel during the First Intifada to provide legal assistance to Israeli settlers who were in court for shooting at Palestinians. Since 1988, the organization has operated the "Matir Assurim - The Jewish Legal Fund" with the stated aim of assisting "Jews victimized by anti-Israel NGOs and government policies, and who personally suffer from the Arab terror let loose on the people of Israel".

Mishmeret Yesha's main operations are now in security training, medical aid, legal assistance, education, the building of connector roads, and land development. By 2008 Mishmeret Yesha had about 4,000 volunteers and had helped train more than 100 "rapid response teams" of settlers in the West Bank. The Israeli Defense Force (IDF) then provides M16 rifles, Tavor rifles, and ammunition to authorized teams. Settlers with civilian gun licenses also carry personal handguns. The IDF also allows Mishmeret Yesha to use its bases for training. The training takes place over a year and involves marksmanship and fitness components. Trainees must also miss 20 workdays during their year of training.

The New York Times described Mishmeret Yesha as a "radical organization" that supports the "creation of jobs and development for Jews" but "rejects working with or acknowledging any legitimacy to Palestinians". The organization does agricultural work intended to maintain a Jewish presence in the West Bank. Their largest project is in the area around Shilo, where they have cleared and planted thousands of dunams of land near Shvut Rachel and Adei Ad. It also owns sheep and has fields around Hebron and Itamar. It also runs a factory which designs and makes bullet-proof vests.

Mishmeret Yesha organizes opposition to directives from Israel's Supreme Court to dismantle Israeli outposts, such as Amona, to prevent them from being carried out. In 2005, Baruch Ben Yosef, one of the patrons of Mishmeret Yesha, said "we can put together thousands of youth".

== Locations ==
Residents of numerous settlements and outposts have received training from Mishmeret Yesha, including Sde Boaz, Shavei Shomron, Kfar Tapuah, Bat Ayin, Pnei Kedem, and Esh Kodesh.

Mishmeret Yesha insists that settlements that receive its training exclude Arabs. Yisrael Danziger told the Jerusalem Post that "we don't want to have anything to do with any organization that employs Arabs. There is no sense in training a rapid response team in a settlement or institution where you have a bunch of Arabs walking around gathering information."

== Yisrael Danziger ==
Mishmeret Yesha founder Danziger made aliyah from Williamsburg, Brooklyn in 1972 at the age of 19. His was the only white family on their street and Danziger recalled that "As early as I can remember I felt strange, out of place, in Williamsburg. Everything about those people was weird, the way they reacted to things. I did not know why I had that feeling."

In 1969 there were anti-Jewish riots in Williamsburg and Danziger attended a speech by Meir Kahane which gave him the idea that Jews could use force to defend themselves and their families. Danziger attributes his eventual foundation of Mishmeret Yesha to this experience.

Danziger has said that Arab citizens of Israel, who make up 20% of Israel's population, should be transferred to an Arab country because they are "intrinsically disloyal to Israel" and "a cancer because of who they are and what they believe". He believes that this "will have to happen in the course of a very major war." Danziger, who rejects the word "Palestinian", has said that "the Arabs have to understand that they can’t stay here" (in the West Bank) and that "there is no in-between possible."

Danziger is a voting member of the Likud Central Committee.
