= Pnei Kedem =

Illegal israeli outpost in the occupied Palestinian West Bank

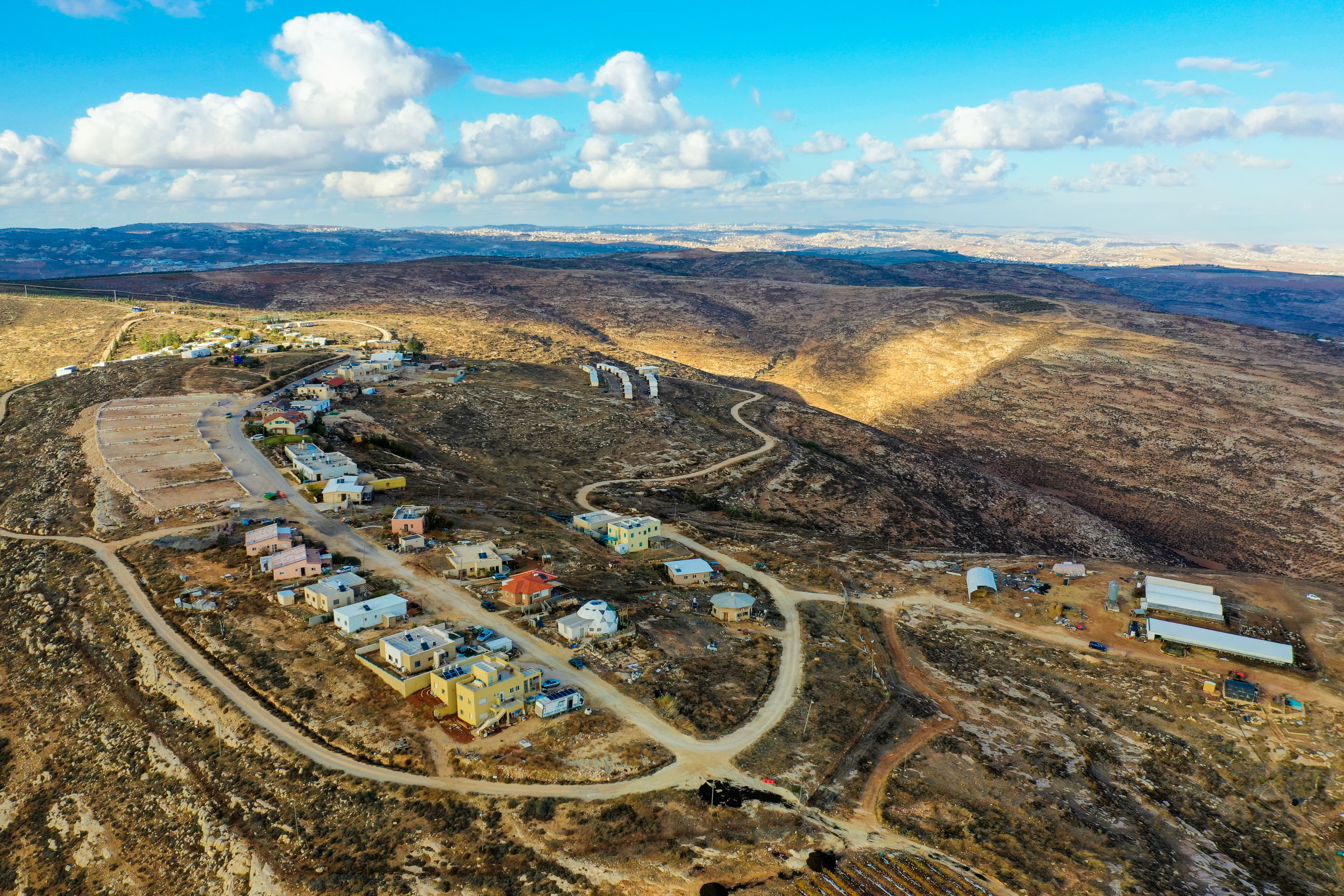

- Location within the Southern West Bank
- Coordinates: 31°35′18″N 35°11′45″E
- Country: Palestine
- District: Judea and Samaria Area
- Council: Gush Etzion
- Region: West Bank
- Founded: 2000
- Founder: Amana
- Population (2011): 70 families
- Website: http://www.pneikedem.org/

Pnei Kedem (Hebrew: פְּנֵי קֶדֶם) is an Israeli settlement in the West Bank. It is located next to the Palestinian city of Si'ir and is formally connected to the Israeli settlement of Metzad, in the southeastern part of the Gush Etzion settlement bloc, in the eastern Judean Mountains facing Nahal Arugot (Arugot Stream). Pnei Kedem stands at an elevation of 930 metres above sea level, 14.5 km east of the Green Line, on the Palestinian side of the Separation Barrier.

The international community considers all Israeli settlements in the occupied West Bank, including East Jerusalem, illegal under international law.

== History ==
The outpost was built in October 2000 with assistance from Amana within the boundaries of the nearby Israeli settlement of Metzad and on adjacent lands. In 2003, Pnei Kedem was given the status of a permanent township without being legalized, receiving lighting and other services from the Israeli Defense Ministry, despite the Israeli government's pledge in the Road Map to remove illegal outposts.

Pnei Kedem holds an annual kite festival during Chol HaMoed Sukkot which attracts thousands of participants.

In November 2007, Haaretz reported that a settler of Pnei Kedem complained that he had 500 olive tree saplings uprooted by Palestinians.

As reported by The Jerusalem Post in 2008, settlers from Pnei Kedem receive "counterterrorism training" from the organization Mishmeret Yesha in "how to quickly neutralize terrorist infiltrators". In September 2011, before the Palestinian Authority's statehood bid at the United Nations, Arutz Sheva published photographs of women from Pnei Kedem being trained with firearms and live ammunition.

The population of Pnei Kedem receives its municipal services from the Gush Etzion Regional Council, which lists it on its official website as a separate community. But as Israeli authorities do not recognize the outpost as an independent settlement, the Israel Central Bureau of Statistics counts its residents as living in Metzad. According to Arutz Sheva, Pnei Kedem was home to 32 families in 2011 and absorbing new residents.

== Notable residents ==
- Simcha Rothman (born 1980), Israeli Religious Zionist Party politician, as of 2022-23 a member of the Knesset
