= Sde Boaz =

Israeli settlement in the West Bank

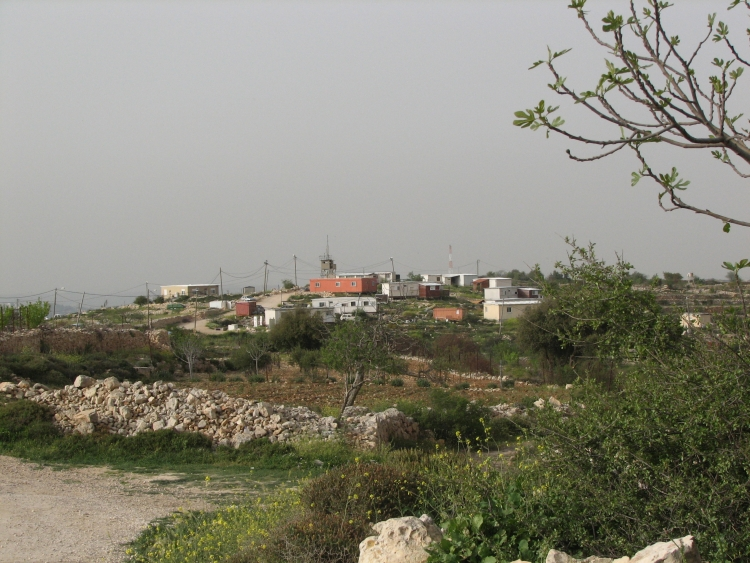

- Location within the Southern West Bank Location within the West Bank Location within State of Palestine
- Coordinates: 31°41′35″N 35°08′52″E
- Country: Palestine
- District: Judea and Samaria Area
- Council: Gush Etzion
- Region: West Bank
- Founded: 2002, legalized 2023
- Founder: Students and soldiers

Sde Boaz (Hebrew: שדה בועז, lit. 'Boaz's Field') is an Israeli settlement in the West Bank, built in 2002 almost entirely on private Palestinian land, and legalized in 2023. Located on a hill above Neve Daniel, it falls under the jurisdiction of Gush Etzion Regional Council.

The international community considers Israeli settlements in the West Bank illegal under international law, but the Israeli government disputes this.

== History ==
The settlement was established in 2002 by Hananel Shear-Yashuv, who claimed the land by moving a shipping container to the top of the hill and moving into it. It is named after Boaz from the Book of Ruth.

In its charter, Sde Boaz proclaims its desire to live in peace with its Arab neighbors and eschew violence. It is an environmentally friendly agricultural community that accepts both religious and non-religious Jews.

Israeli Prime Minister Ehud Olmert has called outposts like Sde Boaz a "disgrace." On taking office in 2006, Olmert began the destruction of illegal outposts in order to comply with the terms of the Road map for peace and by 2008 had agreed to dismantle Sde Boaz among these.

In 2006 Sde Boaz was the site of a massive protest against the court-ordered Israeli Defense Force (IDF) destruction of illegal Israeli construction. The IDF managed to destroy a small house and a stable as the court had ordered, but hundreds of Israeli protesters prevented the soldiers from destroying the foundation of a house under construction.

By 2008 some residents of Sde Boaz were being trained by Mishmeret Yesha, a non-profit organization that teaches settlers counterterrorism techniques and the use of guns so that they can form "rapid response teams." The IDF supplies settlers who've received the training with M16 rifles and ammunition.

On February 12, 2023, the Israeli government legalized Sde Boaz.

== Demographics ==
Most of the residents are professionals who commute to work. Apart from communal agriculture projects, some families engage in private organic farming, raising chickpeas, cauliflower, tomatoes, watermelons, lettuce, grapes, mulberries and olives. Experimental crops include tomatillos, North American pumpkins and sweet peas.
