= Ibei HaNahal =

Coordinates: 31°36′18″N 35°13′8″E

Ibei HaNahal: איבי הנחל (Hebrew)
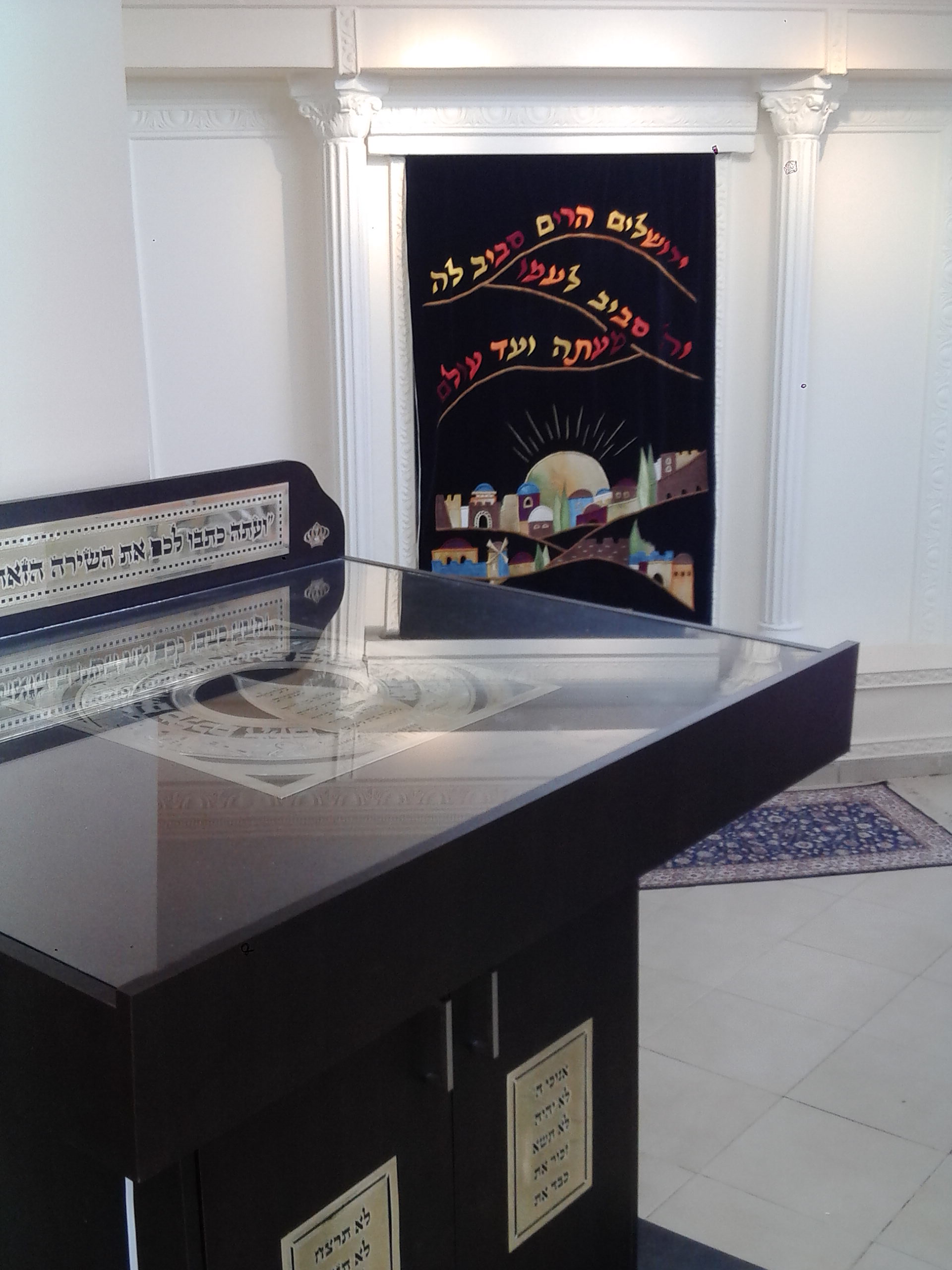
- Interactive map of Ibei HaNahal
- Country: Israel
- District: Judea and Samaria Area
- Council: Gush Etzion
- Region: West Bank
- Founder: Amana
- Population (2011)

Ibei HaNahal (Hebrew: איבי הנחל, lit. Buds of the Valley) is an Israeli settlement within the Gush Etzion settlement block in the West Bank. It was founded in 1999 and named after Biblical words from Song of Songs 6:11.

The residents established it as an ecovillage. On March 22, 2025, the Israeli government legalized Ibei HaNahal.

The international community considers Israeli settlements in the West Bank illegal under international law, but the Israeli government disputes this.
