= Metzad =

Israeli settlement in the West Bank

Metzad: מיצד (Hebrew)

Hebrew transcription(s)
  - Unofficial: Asfar
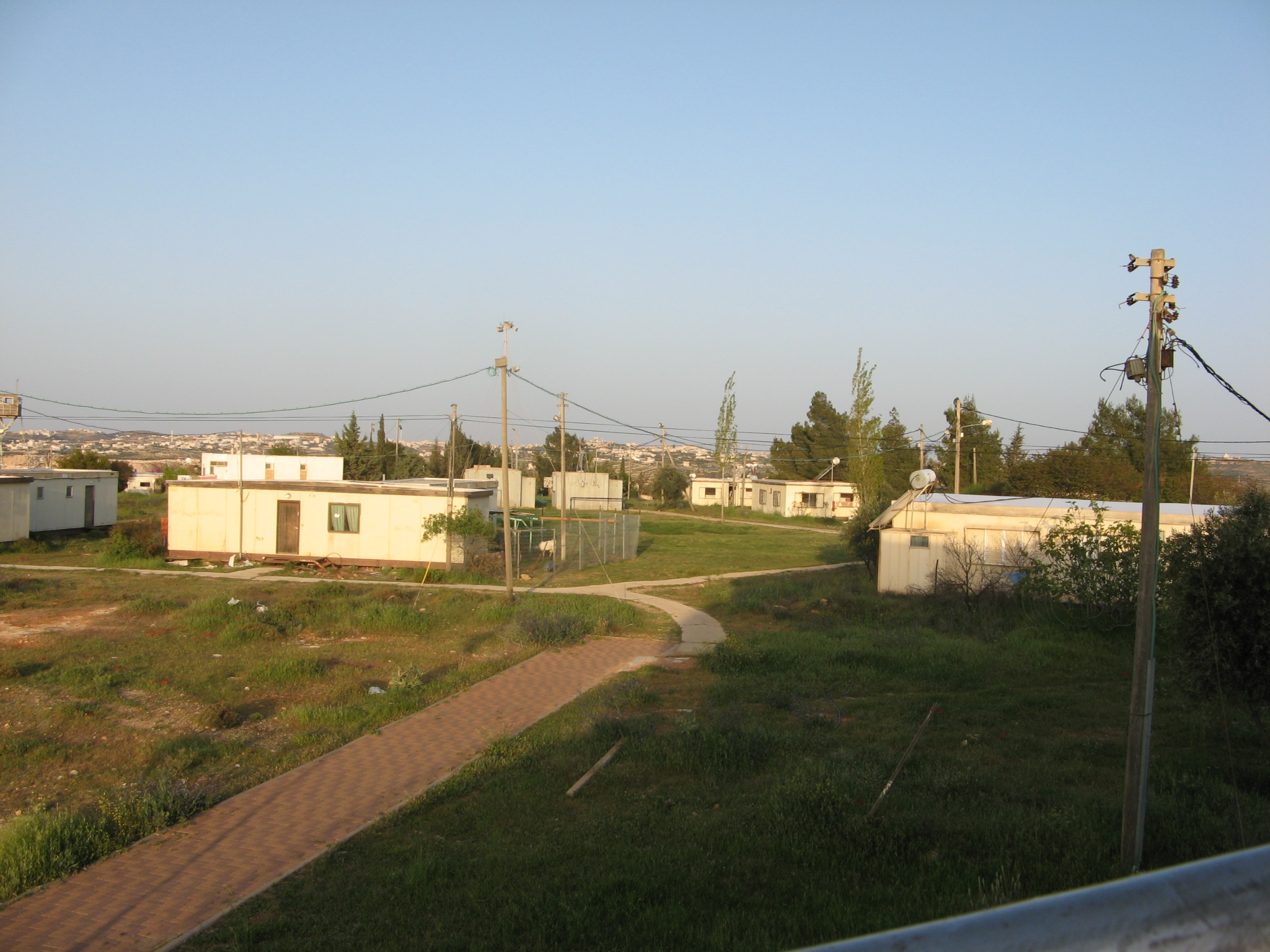

- Location within the Southern West Bank
- Coordinates: 31°35′9″N 35°11′14″E
- Country: Palestine
- District: Judea and Samaria Area
- Council: Gush Etzion
- Region: West Bank
- Founded: 1984
- Population (2024): 1,513

Metzad (Hebrew: מיצד), also known as Asfar (אַסְפָר), is an Israeli settlement organised as a community settlement in the Gush Etzion settlement bloc in the West Bank. Established as by ultra-orthodox Jews in 1984, it is located south of Bethlehem in the eastern Judean Mountains, 14.5 km from the Green Line, outside the Separation Barrier. In January 2022 its population was 1110, up 35% from five years earlier. It falls under the municipal jurisdiction of the Gush Etzion Regional Council.

The international community considers Israeli settlements in the West Bank illegal under international law, but the Israeli government disputes this.

== History ==
Metzad was established in 1984 by immigrants from the United States, the United Kingdom, South Africa and France. The settlement was built on the site of a Nahal paramilitary outpost called Nahal Asfar (named after a biblical place of the Maccabean revolt (1 Maccabees 9:33)) established in 1983, and which Palestinians state was confiscated from the village of Ash-Shuyukh. The first structures on Metzad were erected by the Israel Defense Forces's civil corps of engineers. They were handed over for civilian use at the time of the creation of Metzad in 1984. Initially, the road up to the settlement was unpaved, water was brought by truck, and electricity was sporadically provided by a generator.

The next phase of development involved the placement of sixty caravans to serve as homes, offices, security compound, award-winning Preschool facilities, Clinic, Youth Center, Library, Weaving and Art Studios, and Computer Center. Construction of a new neighborhood of twenty-five permanent homes began in 1992. This included the building of a Family Health Center, an industrial building housing both the Weaving Studio and a Simcha Hall for special events and an outdoor basketball court.

Metzad is the southernmost settlement in the Gush Etzion bloc, and is one of its three Haredi settlements, the others being Betar Illit and Ma'ale Amos. The settlement contains one Kollel: Metzudat David and elementary school "Dover Shalom". The synagogue is the highest building in Metzad. The second floor offers a panoramic view of the Judean Mountains, the Dead Sea and Jerusalem.

Immediately to the west is Khirbet ez-Za'feran or Hurvat Za'afran, thought to be the site of the ancient Bor Asphar (Well of Asphar), where, according to 1 Maccabees and Josephus, the Maccabees gathered following Judas Maccabeus's death.
