= Gush Etzion Regional Council =

Israeli regional council in the West Bank

Coordinates: 31°39′N 35°7′E

Gush Etzion גוש עציון
- Regional council (from 1980)

- Interactive map of Gush Etzion
- Region: West Bank
- District: Judea and Samaria Area

Government
  - Head of Municipality: Yaron Rosenthal

Population (2024)
  - Total: 28,686
- Website: Official website

The Gush Etzion Regional Council (Hebrew: מועצה אזורית גוש עציון, Mo'atza Azorit Gush Etzion) is a regional council in the northern Judean Hills, the northern part of the southern area of the West Bank, administering the settlements in the Gush Etzion region, as well as others nearby. The headquarters are located adjacent to Alon Shvut.

The current mayor of the Council is Yaron Rosenthal, elected in 2024.

In August 2021, Rabbi Yosef Zvi Rimon was elected Chief Rabbi of the Gush Etzion Regional Council.

== List of settlements ==
This regional council provides various municipal services for the following Israeli settlements within its territory:

=== Area of historic Gush Etzion ===
- Alon Shvut (see also Masu'ot Yitzhak: History.)
- Bat Ayin
- Carmei Tzur
- Gvaot
- Elazar
- Har Gilo
- Kfar Etzion, kibbutz
- Migdal Oz, kibbutz
- Neve Daniel
- Rosh Tzurim, kibbutz (see also Ein Tzurim: Original kibbutz.)
- Sde Boaz

=== Judean Mountains area ===
- Ibei Hanachal
- Kedar
- Kfar Eldad
- Ma'ale Amos
- Ma'ale Rehav'am
- Metzad
- Nokdim (El David)
- Pnei Kedem
- Tekoa

All of the settlements in the historic Gush Etzion area are on the Israeli side of the West Bank Barrier, except for Carmei Tzur. None of the settlements in the Judean Mountains area are, except for Kedar which is located far north of the others very close to Maale Adummim and is within the eastern Jerusalem section of the barrier.

== Demographics ==
Historical population
Year	Pop.	±%
1983	2,800	—
1995	6,200	+121.4%
2008	14,200	+129.0%
2022	26,400	+85.9%
2024	28,526	+8.1%

== Voting Patterns ==
In the 2022 election, 87 percent of voters in the regional council voted for the parties of the right-wing coalition led by Benjamin Netanyahu, while 13 percent voted for the parties of the center-left coalition led by Yair Lapid and 0.06 percent voted for the Arab parties.

In the 2026 election, 73 percent of voters in the regional council voted for the parties of the right-wing coalition led by Benjamin Netanyahu, while 14 percent voted for the parties of the center-left coalition led by Gadi Eisenkot and 0.1 percent voted for the Arab parties. An additional 3.5 percent voted for the Reservists, and 7.4 percent voted for Amcha Yisrael. Voter turnout increased 27 percent from the 2022 election.
