= Neve Daniel =

Israeli settlement in the West Bank

Neve Daniel: נְוֵה דָּנִיֵּאל (Hebrew)
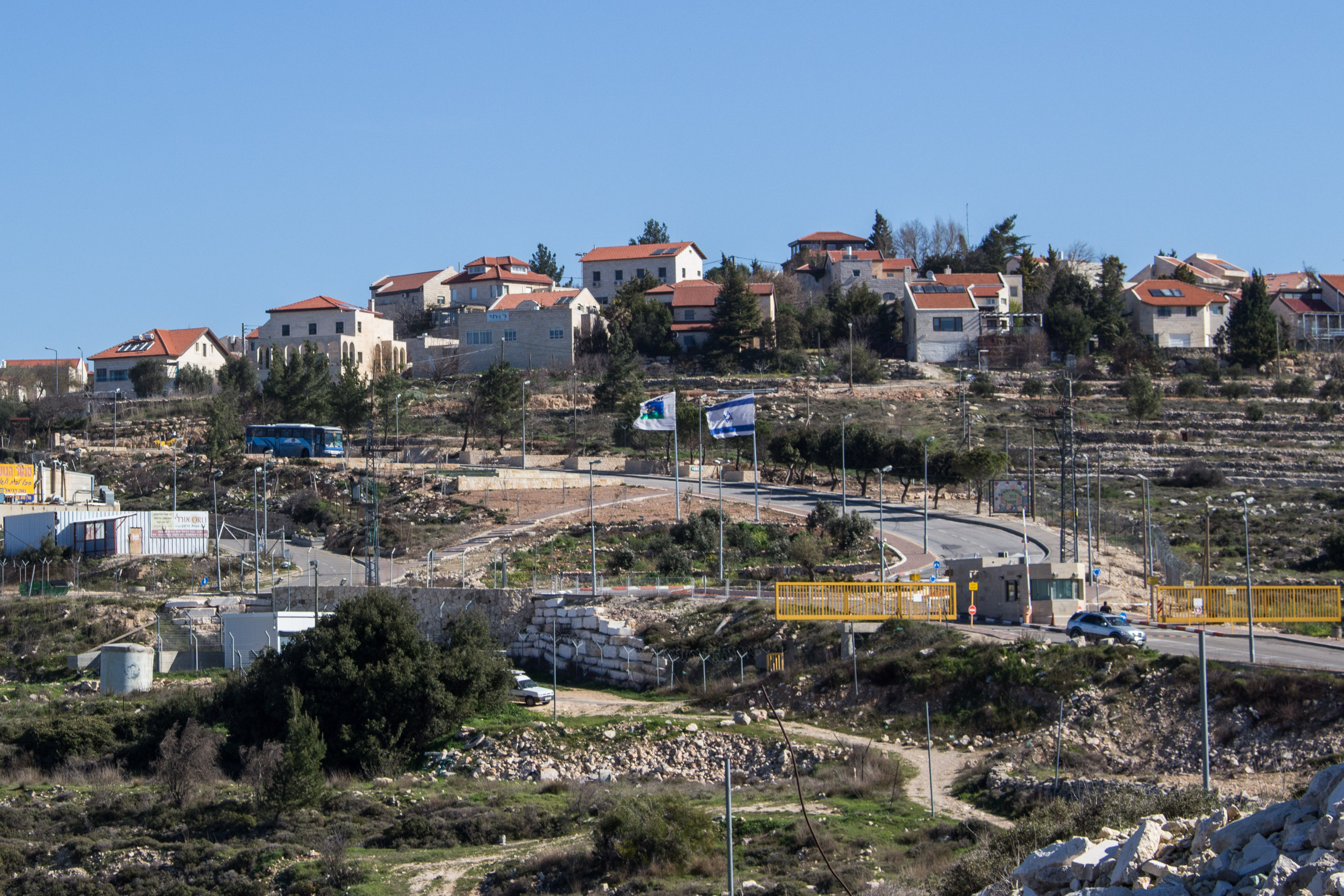

- Location within Israel Location within the West Bank Location within the Southern West Bank
- Coordinates: 31°40′37″N 35°08′37″E
- Country: Palestine
- District: Judea and Samaria Area
- Council: Gush Etzion
- Region: West Bank
- Affiliation: Hapoel HaMizrachi
- Founded: 18 July 1982
- Population (2024): 2,418

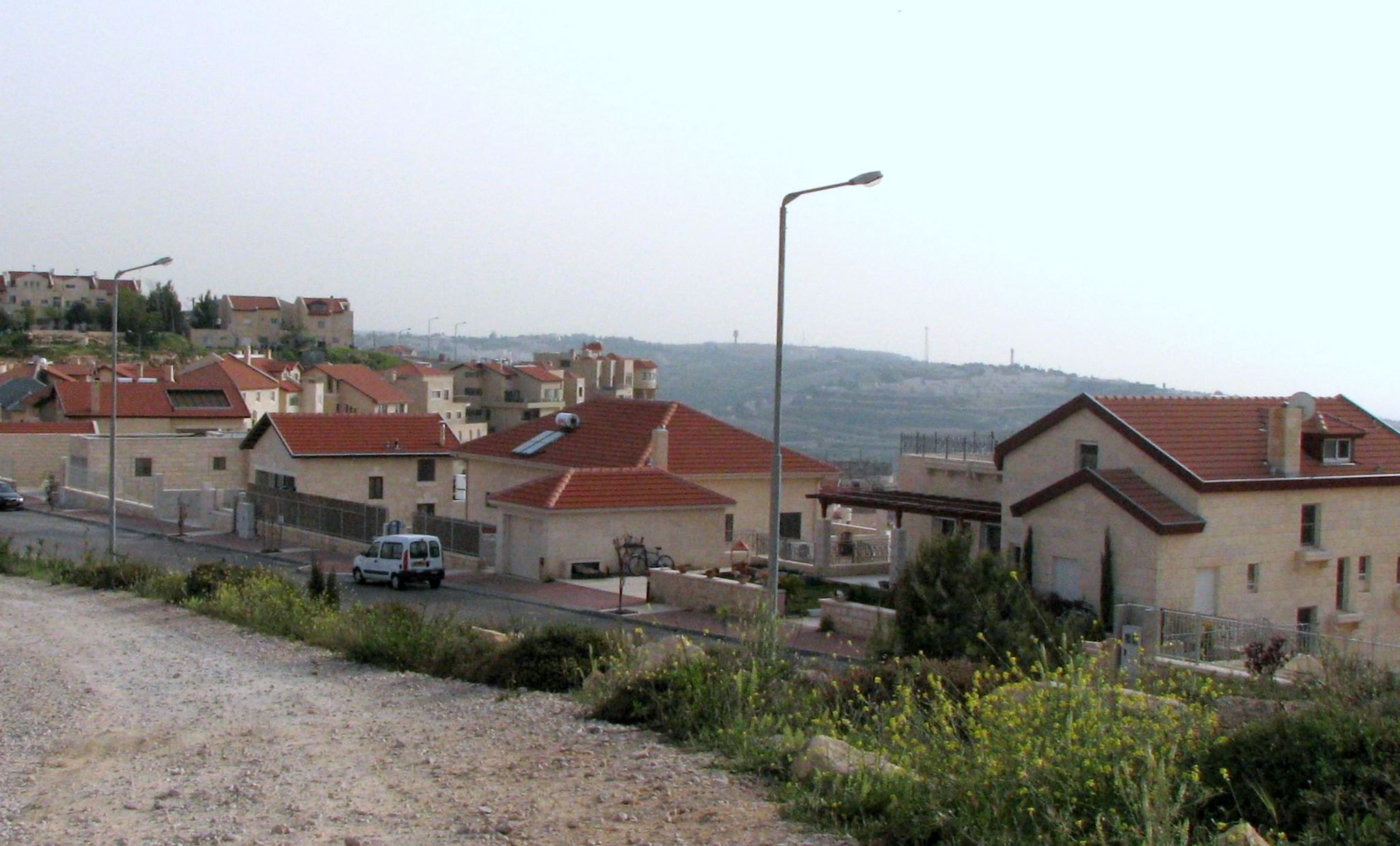
Neve Daniel

Neve Daniel (Hebrew: נְוֵה דָּנִיֵּאל) is an Israeli settlement in the West Bank. Located in western Gush Etzion south of Jerusalem and just west of Bethlehem, it sits atop one of the highest points in the area – close to 1,000 meters above sea level, and has a view of much of the Mediterranean coastal plain, as well as the mountains of Jordan. In 2024, it had a population of 2,418. It is organised as a community settlement and falls under the jurisdiction of Gush Etzion Regional Council.

The international community considers Israeli settlements in the West Bank illegal under international law, but the Israeli government disputes this.

== Geography ==
Neve Daniel is located in the western part of the Gush Etzion bloc, approximately 12 kilometers south of Jerusalem and immediately west of Bethlehem. The town lies along the ridge separating the Judean Mountains from the coastal plain, at an elevation approaching 1,000 meters above sea level. Due to its height, Neve Daniel experiences colder winters than much of central Israel and occasionally receives snowfall.

The community overlooks large portions of the Mediterranean coastal plain to the west, including on clear days views extending as far as Ashdod and Tel Aviv, as well as the eastern Judean Desert and the mountains of Jordan to the east.

== History ==
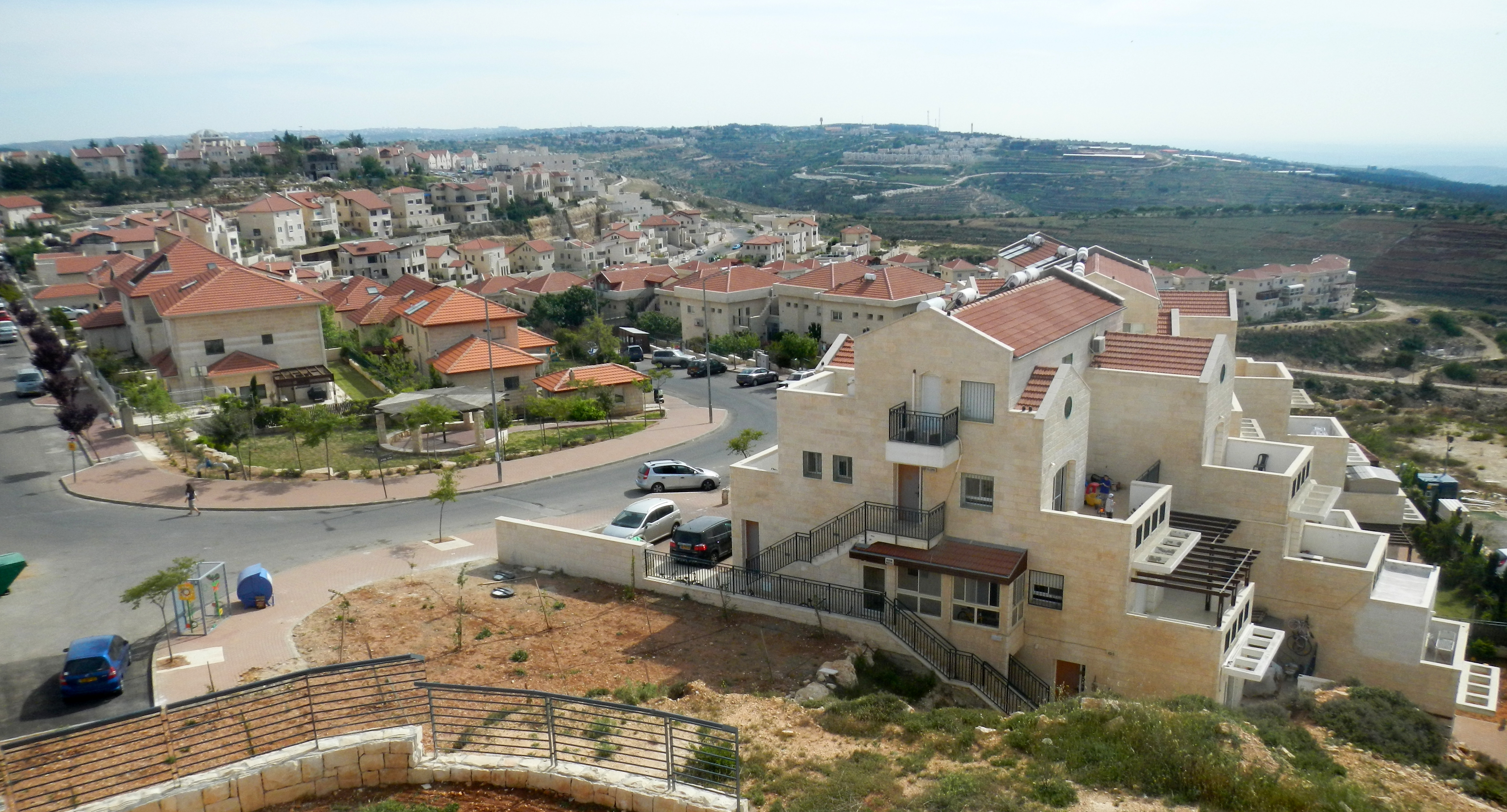
Neve Daniel

Neve Daniel was established on 18 July 1982 on the site of The Cohen Farm. The Cohen Farm was founded on September 6, 1935, on lands purchased from Arab residents of Bethlehem, that were transferred to the Jewish National Fund in 1943. The farm was abandoned during the Arab riots, and remained under Jordanian control until 1967.

According to ARIJ, Israel confiscated land from two nearby Palestinian villages in order to construct Neve Daniel:

- 556 dunams from Wadi an-Nis,
- 27 dunams from Al-Khader.

The new community was named for an-Nabi Daniel, Arabic for Prophet Daniel, a site at a bend in the road several kilometers southwest of Bethlehem where a convoy bringing supplies to Gush Etzion was ambushed. The loss of the "Nabi Daniel Convoy" became a turning point in the fight for Gush Etzion. The road to Gush Etzion had been blocked by Arab villagers who organized attacks on vehicles traveling to and from Jerusalem. The convoys traversing the route consisted mainly of so-called "sandwich trucks", improvised armored vehicles reinforced with two sheets of steel welded onto the cabin and cargo area and a layer of wood placed in between. On 27 March 1948, a convoy of 51 vehicles returning from Gush Etzion encountered an impassable roadblock and came to a halt. The Arabs positioned on both sides of the road opened fire. According to Irgun fighter Yehuda Lapidot, during the battle, 15 Jewish fighters were killed, 73 wounded, and most of the Haganah's fleet of armored transport vehicles, 10 armored cars, 4 armored buses and 25 armor-plated trucks, were destroyed. An alternative theory is that the community was named by the leader of another convoy destroyed while attempting at resupplying Gush Etzion in 1948, Daniel "Dani" Mass of the Convoy of 35.

On a visit to Neve Daniel in 2009, former U.S. president Jimmy Carter told his hosts: "I have been fortunate this afternoon in learning the perspectives that I did not have." At a meeting in the garden of Shaul Goldstein, who was then the head of the Gush Etzion regional council, Carter said: "This particular settlement area is not one that I can envision ever being abandoned or changed over into Palestinian territory. This is part of settlements close to the 1967 line that I think will be here forever."

== Status under international law ==
Like all Israeli settlements in the Israeli-occupied territories, Neve Daniel is considered illegal under international law, though Israel disputes this. The international community considers Israeli settlements to violate the Fourth Geneva Convention's prohibition on the transfer of an occupying power's civilian population into occupied territory. Israel disputes that the Fourth Geneva Convention applies to the Palestinian territories as they had not been legally held by a sovereign prior to Israel taking control of them. This view has been rejected by the International Court of Justice and the International Committee of the Red Cross.

== Demography ==
Neve Daniel has a mixed population of native Israelis and immigrants from the former Soviet Union, France, Canada, and the United States. The population doubled from 800 residents in 2001 to nearly 1,500 in 2008, and in 2015 to 2,577 residents comprising over 400 families. The majority of residents are religious Zionists.

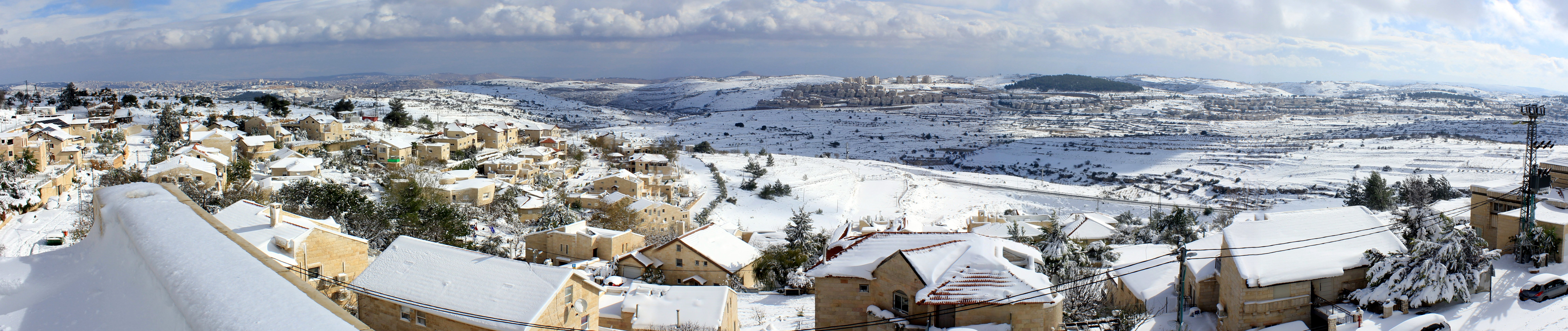
Snow in Neve Daniel, 2013

== Architecture ==
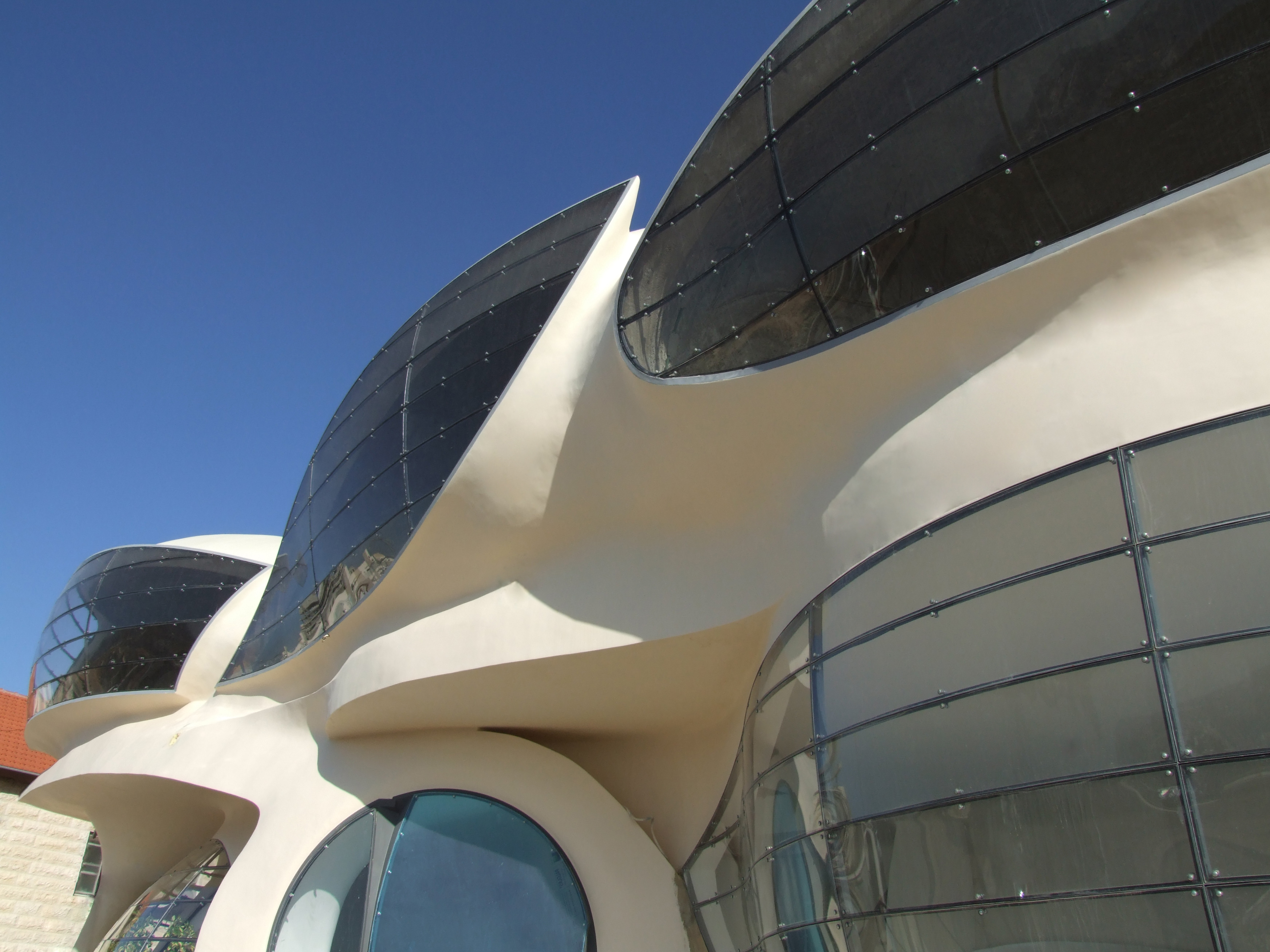
The Pavie House

Ephraim Henry Pavie, a French-born architect who made aliyah to Israel in 1983, designed a free form four-story concrete house for his family in Neve Daniel. None of the above-ground walls is straight. Pavie, whose architectural style Yonatan Kanti of the Israeli daily Ma'ariv compared to the futurism of Eero Saarinen's TWA Flight Center, said the house attracts attention from passers-by but is not universally appreciated.

== Notable residents ==
- David Bar-Hayim (born 1960), rabbi and philosopher
- Yuli Edelstein (born 1958), Israeli politician (Likud)
- Yuval Freilich (born 1995), épée fencer, 2019 European Épée Champion
- Shuli Mualem (born 1965), Israeli politician (The Jewish Home)
