= Ma'ale Amos =

Israeli settlement in the West Bank

Ma'ale Amos: מַעֲלֵה עָמוֹס (Hebrew)
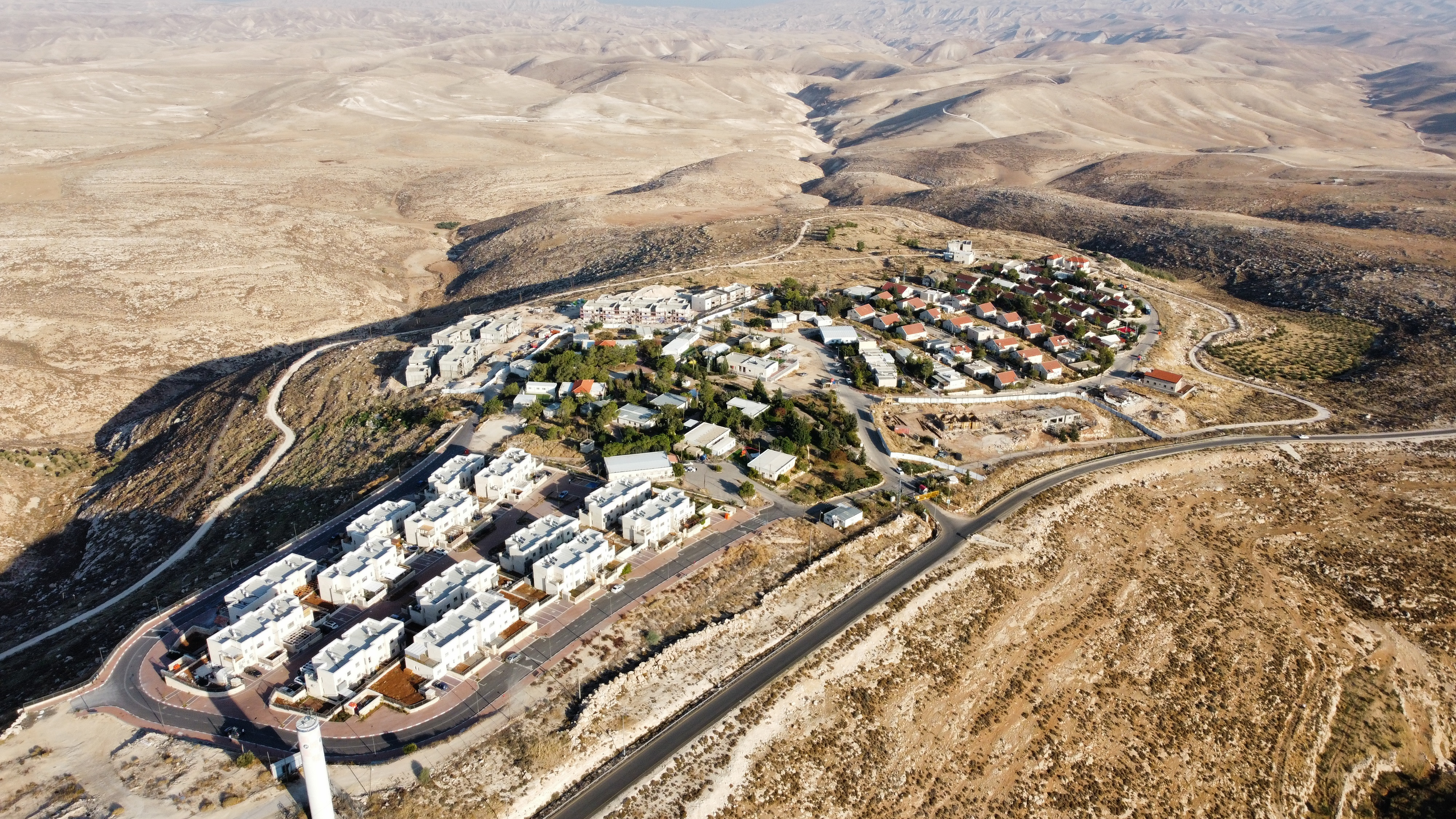
- Etymology: Ascent of Amos
- Location within the Southern West Bank Location within the West Bank
- Coordinates: 31°35′47″N 35°13′46″E
- Country: Palestine
- District: Judea and Samaria Area
- Council: Gush Etzion
- Region: West Bank
- Affiliation: Mishkei Herut Beitar
- Founded: 1981
- Population (2024): 1,340
- Website: gush-etzion.org.il/project/maale-amos-2/

Ma'ale Amos (Hebrew: מַעֲלֵה עָמוֹס, lit Ascent of Amos) is an Israeli settlement organized as a community settlement in the southern West Bank. Located 20 km southeast of Jerusalem, at an elevation of 725 meters above sea level, it falls under the jurisdiction of Gush Etzion Regional Council. In 2024 it had a population of 1,340.

Israeli settlements in the West Bank are considered by the international community to be illegal under international law, which the Israeli government disputes.

== History ==
The settlement was established in 1981 by the Jewish Agency and Aish HaTorah. and was named after the Biblical prophet Amos, who lived in the village of Tekoa nearby.

One of the community's founders was rabbi and former actor Uri Zohar. An early resident was Aryeh Deri, now head of the Shas party, whose first political position was as the representative of Ma'ale Amos to the Gush Etzion Regional Council. The town's first spiritual leader was Rabbi Hillel Zaks, grandson of the Yisrael Meir Kagan, the Chofetz Chaim. The first mayor was Rabbi Moshe Lazerus.

By end of the 1990s, almost half the population was made of immigrants from the Soviet Union. Many others including the Rabbi, Zev Wolf Charlop, are immigrants from the United States.

The settlement has two elementary schools, a Beis Yaakov for girls, and cheder for boys.
