= Nokdim =

Israeli settlement in the West Bank

Nokdim: נוֹקְדִים (Hebrew)
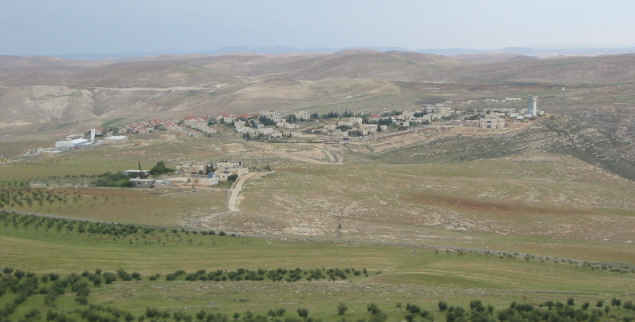

- Location within the Southern West Bank
- Coordinates: 31°38′38″N 35°14′41″E
- Country: Palestine
- District: Judea and Samaria Area
- Council: Gush Etzion
- Region: West Bank
- Affiliation: Amana
- Founded: 5 July 1982
- Founder: Residents of Tekoa
- Population (2024): 3,498

Nokdim (Hebrew: נוֹקְדִים, lit. Shepherds) is an Israeli settlement organized as a community settlement in the West Bank. Located south of Bethlehem in the northern Judean Mountains, it falls under the jurisdiction of Gush Etzion Regional Council. In 2024 it had a population of 3,498.

The international community considers Israeli settlements in the West Bank illegal under international law, but the Israeli government disputes this.

A mixed community of religious and secular Jews, both native Israelis and immigrants, Nokdim is home to the religious pre-army Mechina Magen Shaul, established in 1996.

== History ==
Nokdim was founded on 5 July 1982 by residents of Tekoa. The settlement was originally named El-David in memory of two residents of Tekoa—Eli Pressman, a new immigrant from France who was killed in the 1982 Lebanon War, and David Rosenfeld, manager of the tourist site at Herodium who was murdered in July 1982 by two of his Palestinian employees. The name was rejected by the Government Naming Committee who suggested the name Nokdim, which was accepted by the settlers.

The name is taken from the Bible (Amos 1:1) because of nearby settlement of Tekoa: "...Amos, who was among the shepherds of Tekoa".

== Land dispute ==
A 2006 Peace Now-report said that up to 30 percent of the land Nokdim is built on is privately owned, all or most of it by Palestinians. According to Israeli law, settlements on privately owned Palestinian land are illegal.

== Israeli–Palestinian conflict ==
In September 2001, Sarit Amrani (26) of Nokdim was murdered in Tekoa when terrorists opened fire on her family's car. Her husband Shai was seriously injured, while their three children, Zohar (4), Ziv (2) and Raz (3 months), who were in the car at the time of the shooting survived physically unharmed.

In February 2002, Aharon Gorov (46) and Avraham Fish (65) were murdered in a shooting attack between Nokdim and Tekoa. Fish's daughter Tamar Lipschitz, who was nine months pregnant, was shot in the stomach. After being rushed to the hospital, she delivered a daughter through Caesarean section. Fish's granddaughter, Karine (4), suffered from shock. Al-Aqsa Martyrs' Brigades claimed responsibility.

== Notable residents ==
- Avigdor Lieberman (born 1958), former Israeli Defense Minister (Yisrael Beiteinu) and former Foreign Minister.
