= Way of the Patriarchs =

Transportation route in ancient Israel

Coordinates: 32°02′51″N 35°17′20″E

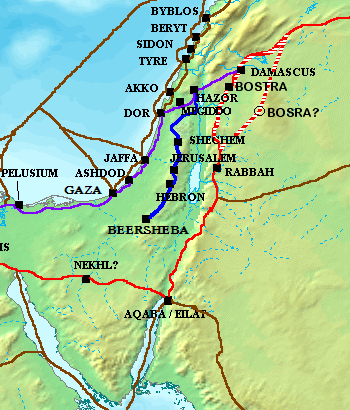
Way of the Patriarchs (blue) with Via Maris (purple) and King's Highway (red)

The Road of the Patriarchs or Way of the Patriarchs (Hebrew: דֶּרֶךְ הֲאָבוֹת Derech haʾAvot Lit. Way (of) the Fathers) is an ancient north–south route traversing the land of Israel and the region of Palestine. The modern Highway 60 (Israel-Palestine) follows roughly the route of the Way of the Patriarchs. The name is used by biblical scholars because of mentions in biblical narratives that it was frequently travelled by Abraham, Isaac and Jacob.

It is also called the Hill Road or the Ridge Route because it follows the watershed ridge line of the Samarian and Judaean Mountains. It runs from Megiddo and Hazor south to Beersheba by way of Shechem, Bethel, Jerusalem, Ephrath and Hebron. Unlike the Via Maris and the King's Highway which were international roads crossing the territories of many peoples, the Ridge Route was wholly within the territory of ancient Israel.

== Modern equivalent ==
The modern Highway 60 follows roughly the route of the Way of the Patriarchs (without the more recent bypasses), passing through Afula, Jenin, Nablus, Ramallah, Jerusalem, Bethlehem, Halhul, Hebron and Dhahiriya.

== Archaeological findings ==
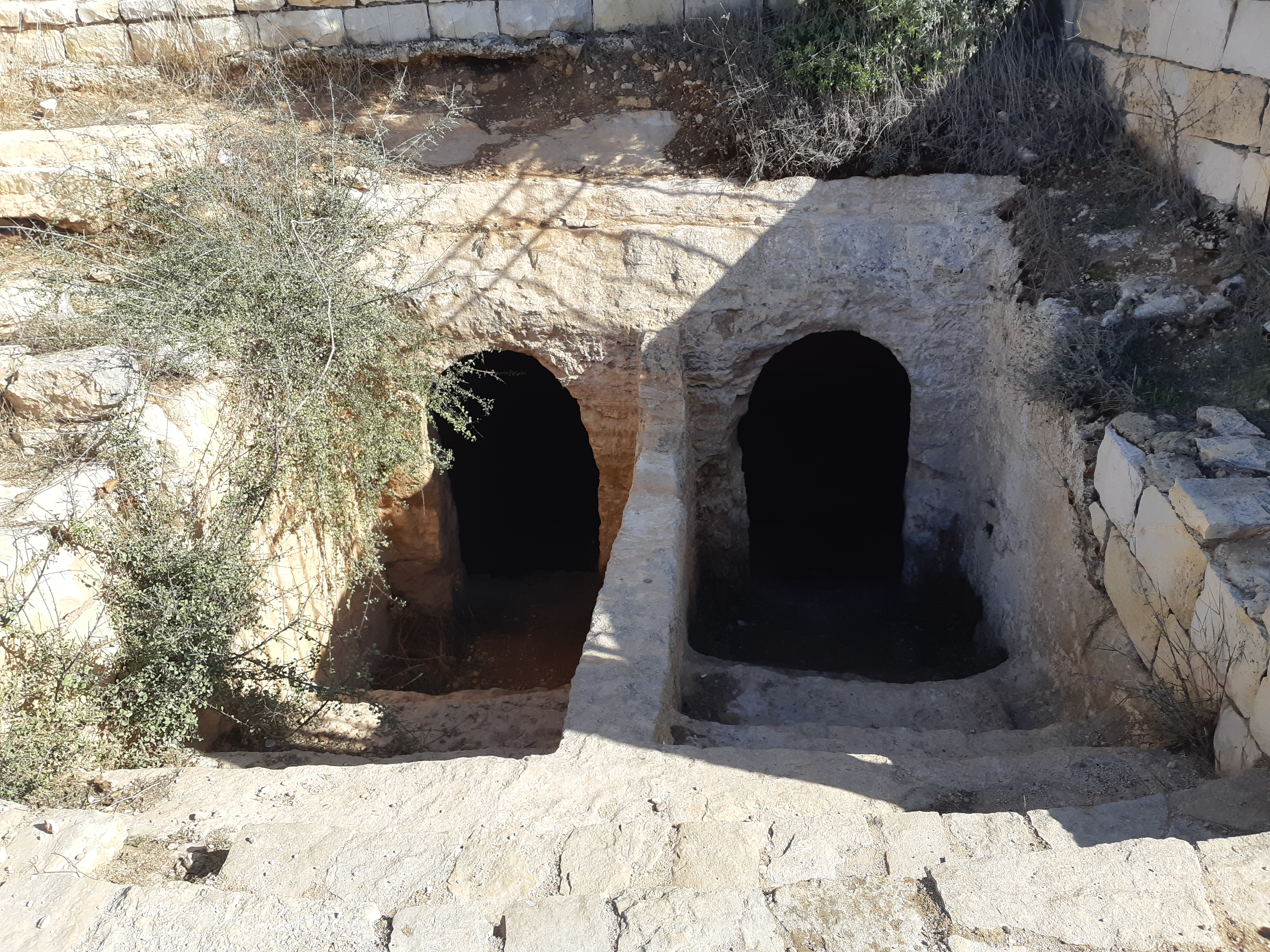
Entrance to ritual baths (mikve) for pilgrims on the Way of the Patriarchs near Alon Shvut

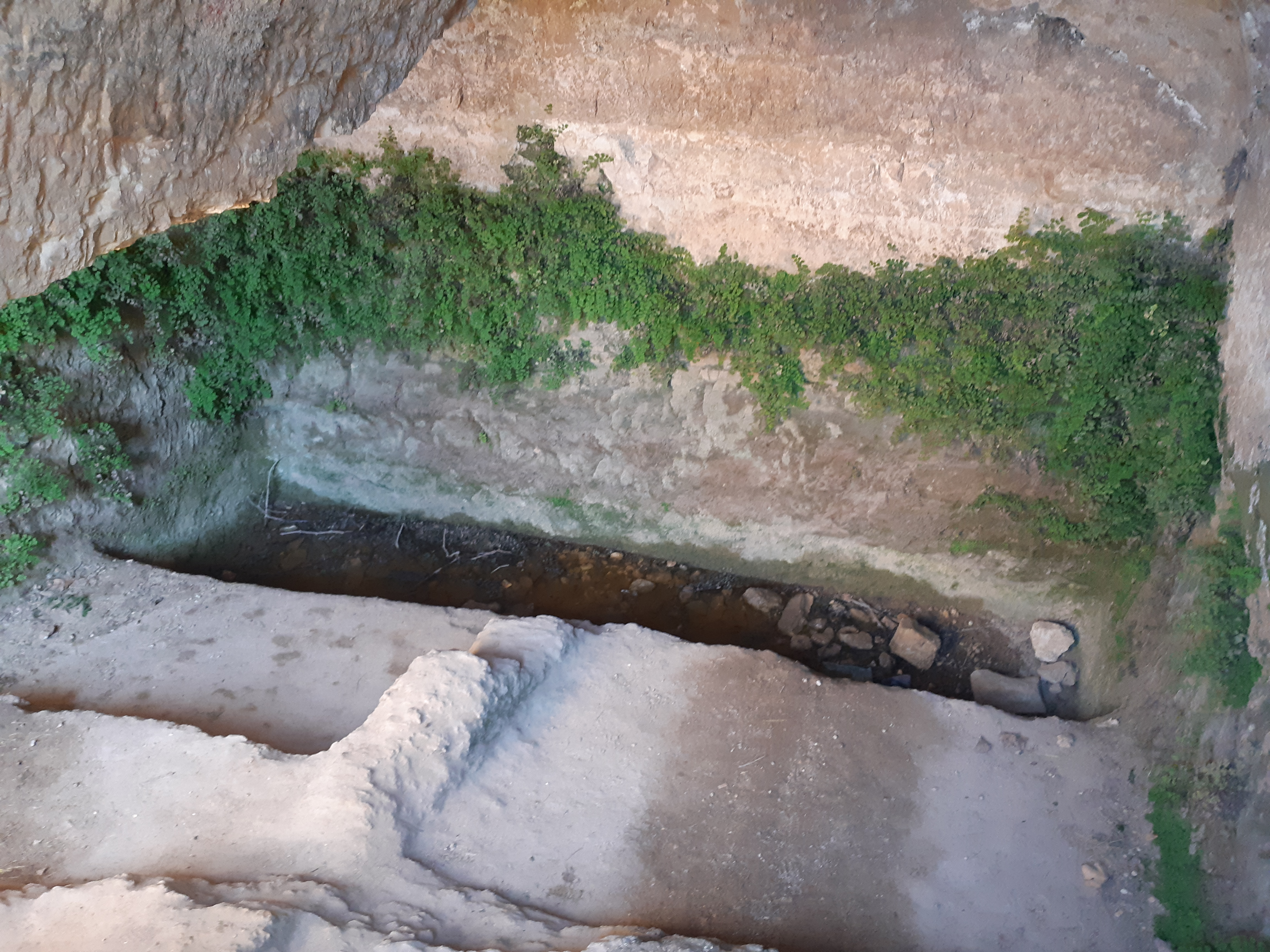
Interior of ritual baths (mikve) on the Way of the Patriarchs near Alon Shvut

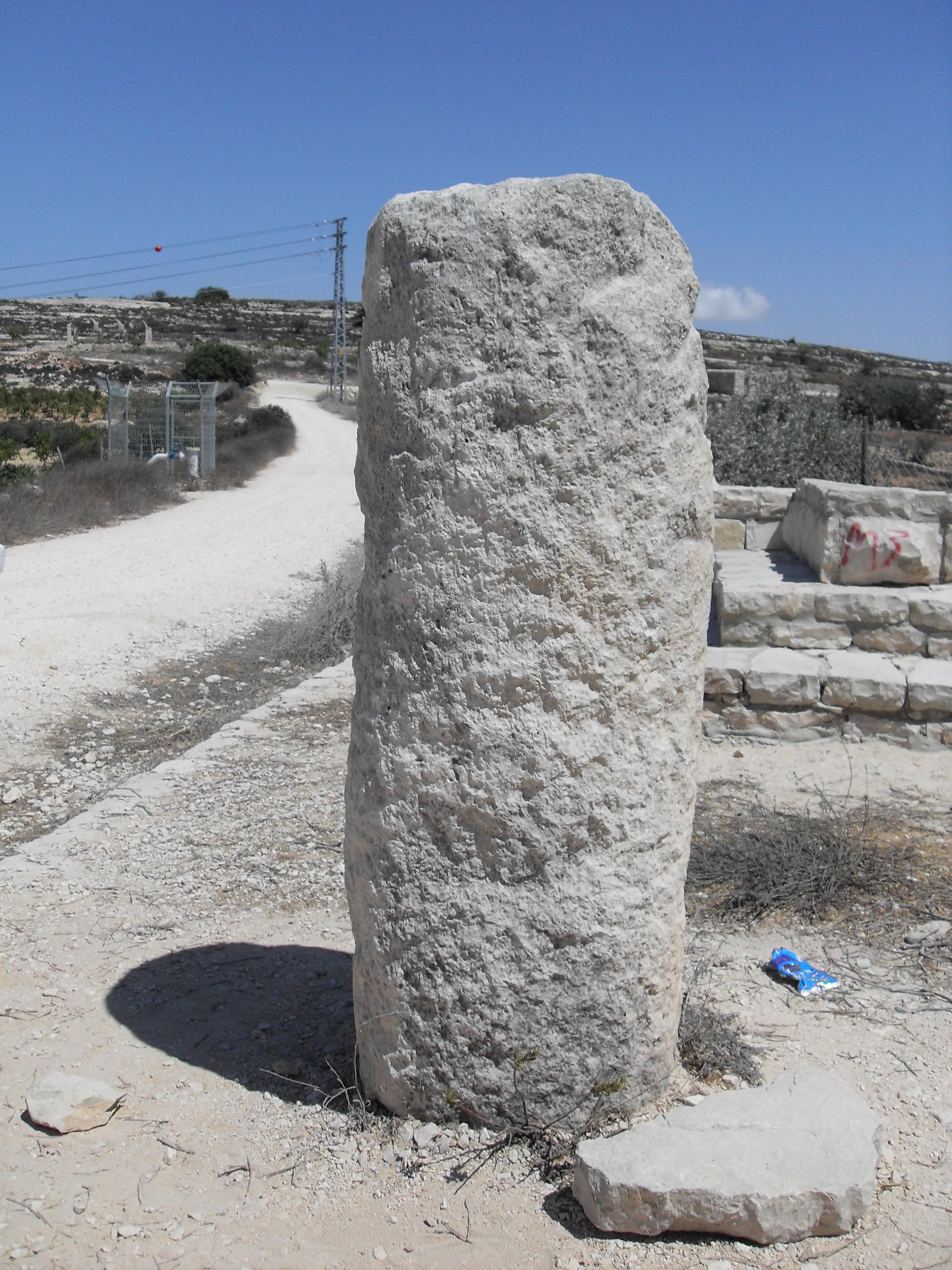
Roman milestone adjacent to the ritual baths near Alon Shvut

=== Ritual baths ===
Way stations were discovered along the route between Beersheba and Jerusalem from the time of the ancient Temple and later during the Hellenistic and Roman eras. Ritual baths (mikvaot, Hebrew: מקוואות) served pilgrims during their journey.

=== Milestones ===
Milestones have been discovered along the route signalling that, even in Roman times, the route was used as a major road. The stones represent the distance to Jerusalem.

== Biblical events ==
=== The Maccabees' Battle of Beth Zechariah ===
The Way of the Patriarchs passes by Khirbet Beit Zakariyyah, a small Palestinian village near the Israeli settlement of Alon Shevut, possibly the site of the Battle of Beth Zechariah between Judas Maccabeus and the Seleucid Greeks. It was there that Judah's brother, Eleazar Avaran, was killed after stabbing and killing one of the Greek elephants. This incident is commemorated by the name of the adjacent community, Elazar.

=== Battle of Gibeah ===
The biblical story of the Concubine of the Hill from the Book of Judges, leading up to the battle of Gibeah (Judges 19), tells of a small family caravan journeying on the ridge route from Bethlehem towards Jerusalem. Gibeah is generally identified with Tell el-Fūl.

== Route near ancient Jerusalem ==
Ancient Jerusalem (today's Old City) was not situated on the mountain watershed. Indeed, the Ridge Route did not pass directly through the ancient city but was situated just to the west, about a 20-minute walk from the city walls. The route from Bethel southwards would have passed through today's neighborhoods of Beit Hanina, Shuafat, French Hill, Givat HaMivtar and Kerem Avraham, crossing Jaffa Road at the center of modern down-town Jerusalem behind the HaMashbir Department Store building, and continuing along Shmuel HaNagid St. (peak height: Ratisbonne Monastery), King George St., Keren HaYesod St., and finally the Hebron Road to Bethlehem.

== East-west connections ==
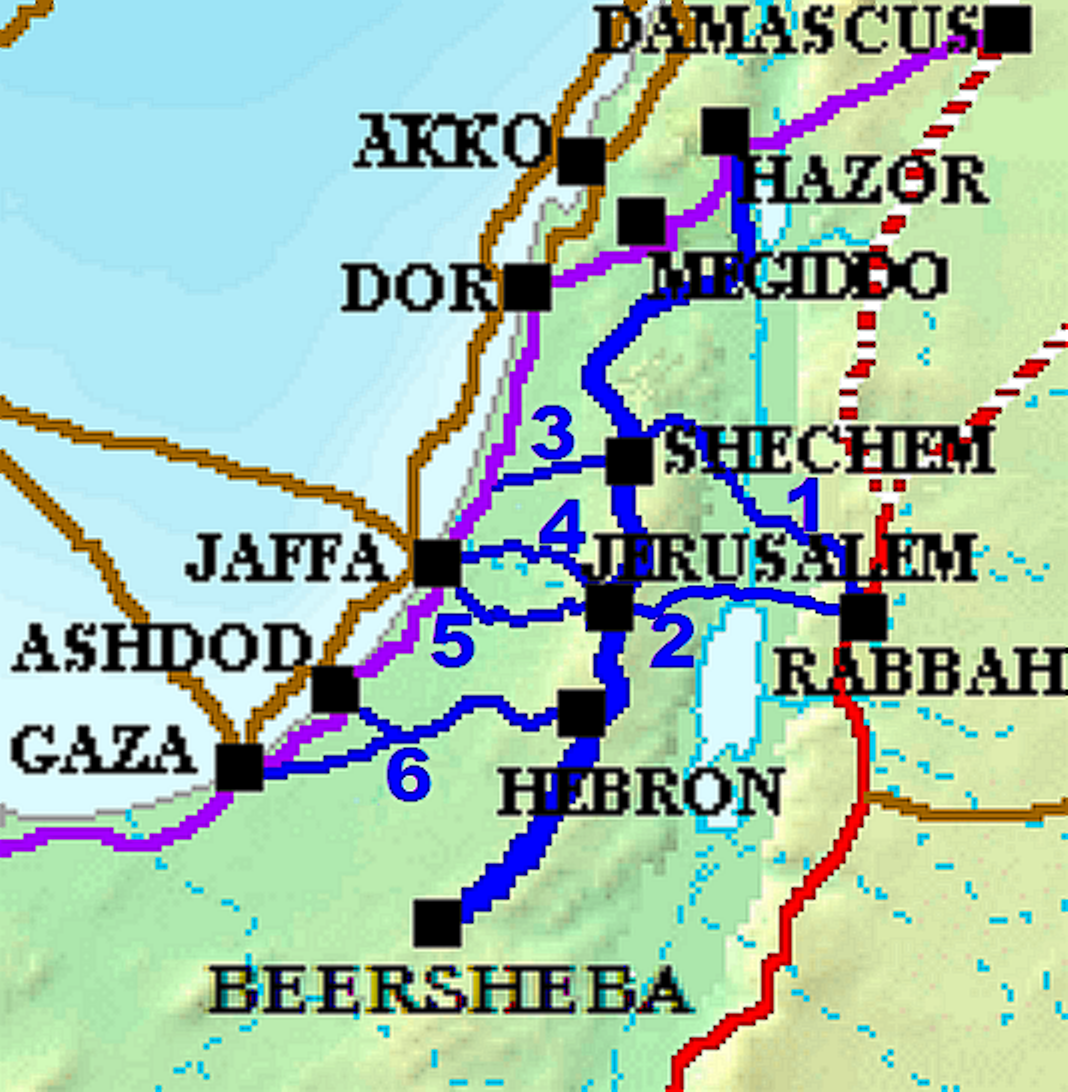
Roads across the Way of the Patriarchs (blue): 1–Sunset Road 2–Red Ascent 3–Aphek Ascent 4–Beit Horon Ascent 5–Ayalon Road 6–Lachish Road

The route connected to Via Maris and the King's Highway by way of several east-west roads:

An important connection was "The Sunset Road" (Hebrew: דֶּרֶךְ מְבוֹא הַשֶּמֶש Derech Mevo HaShemesh) (Deut 11:29–30) leading from The King's Highway, crossing the Jordan River at the location of today's Adam Bridge (Jisr Damiat) and ascending through the Tirtza Valley (Wadi Al Fara) to Mount Gerizim and Shechem. Today's eastern leg of Route 57 roughly follows the ancient track.

The "Red Ascent" (Hebrew: מַעֲלֵה אֲדֻמִּים Ma'ale Adumim) (Joshua 15:7 and Joshua 18:17) formed a boundary of the tribe of Judah ascending from the Valley of Achor to Debir and turning north to Gilgal. It takes its name from the red rock lining the ascent. Highway 1 between Jerusalem and the Jordan Valley follows the ancient route.

To the west of Shechem, the ancient "Aphek Ascent" from the Via Maris and the coastal plain passed through Aphek, Soco and today's Kfar Saba. Highway 55 duplicates the eastern part of this route.

"The Bethoron Ascent" (Hebrew: מַעֲלֵה בֵּית חוֹרוֹן Ma'ale Beit Horon) (Josh 10:10) from the coastal plain passes today's Ben Gurion Airport, then rose along an offshoot of the watershed ridge leading to today's Beit Hanina as it approached Jerusalem. Today's Route 443 follows the ancient road with minor deviations.

The ascent from Jaffa to Jerusalem through the Plain of Ayalon is now duplicated by Route 412, Highway 44 and Route 1.

Further south, Highway 35 roughly follows the path of the ancient "Lachish Road" from Gaza, Ashkelon and Ashdod through the Lachish region to Hebron.

== See also ==
- Incense Route
- King's Highway
- Nablus Road inside East Jerusalem
- Via Maris
