= Migdal Oz =

Israeli settlement in the West Bank

Migdal Oz: מִגְדַּל עֹז (Hebrew)
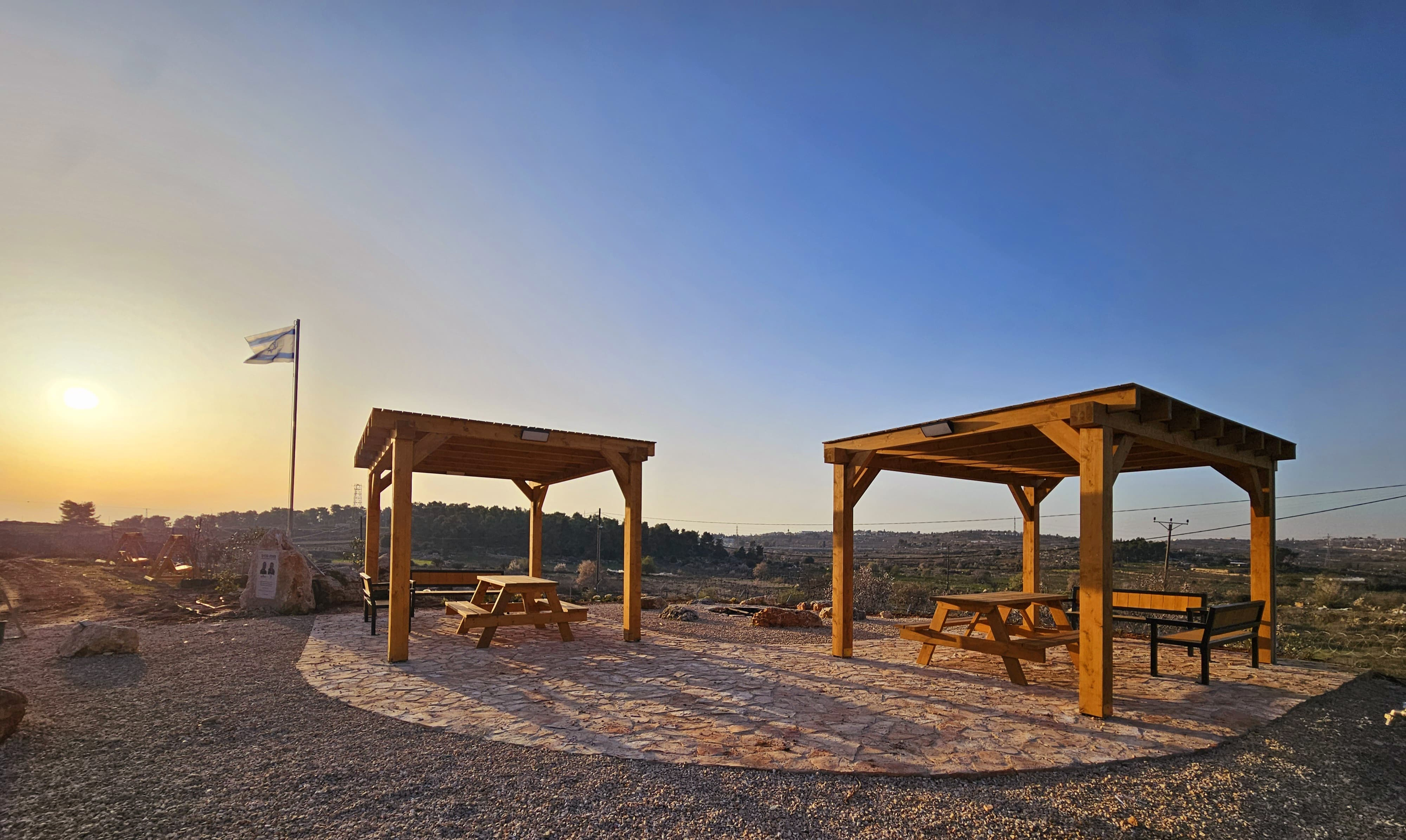

- Location within the Southern West Bank
- Coordinates: 31°38′27″N 35°8′38″E
- Country: Palestine
- District: Judea and Samaria Area
- Council: Gush Etzion
- Region: West Bank
- Affiliation: Religious Kibbutz Movement
- Founded: 1977
- Population (2024): 615

Migdal Oz (Hebrew: מִגְדַּל עֹז, lit. Tower of Strength) is an Israeli settlement and income-sharing community kibbutz in the West Bank. Located in the historic Etzion bloc 7.4 km from the Green Line and west of the Israeli West Bank barrier, it falls under the jurisdiction of Gush Etzion Regional Council. It neighbors the communities of Kfar Etzion, Alon Shevut, Elazar and Efrat. In 2024 it had a population of 615.

The international community considers Israeli settlements in the West Bank illegal under international law, but the Israeli government disputes this.

== History ==
Migdal Oz was established in 1977 on the site of Migdal Eder, a Jewish village destroyed 50 years previously early in the course of the 1929 Palestine riots. The name is taken from a Biblical phrase describing God, written in Psalm 61:4 and Proverbs 18:10.

According to ARIJ, Israel confiscated 41 dunams of land from the Palestinian village of Khirbet Beit Zakariyyah in order to construct Migdal Oz.

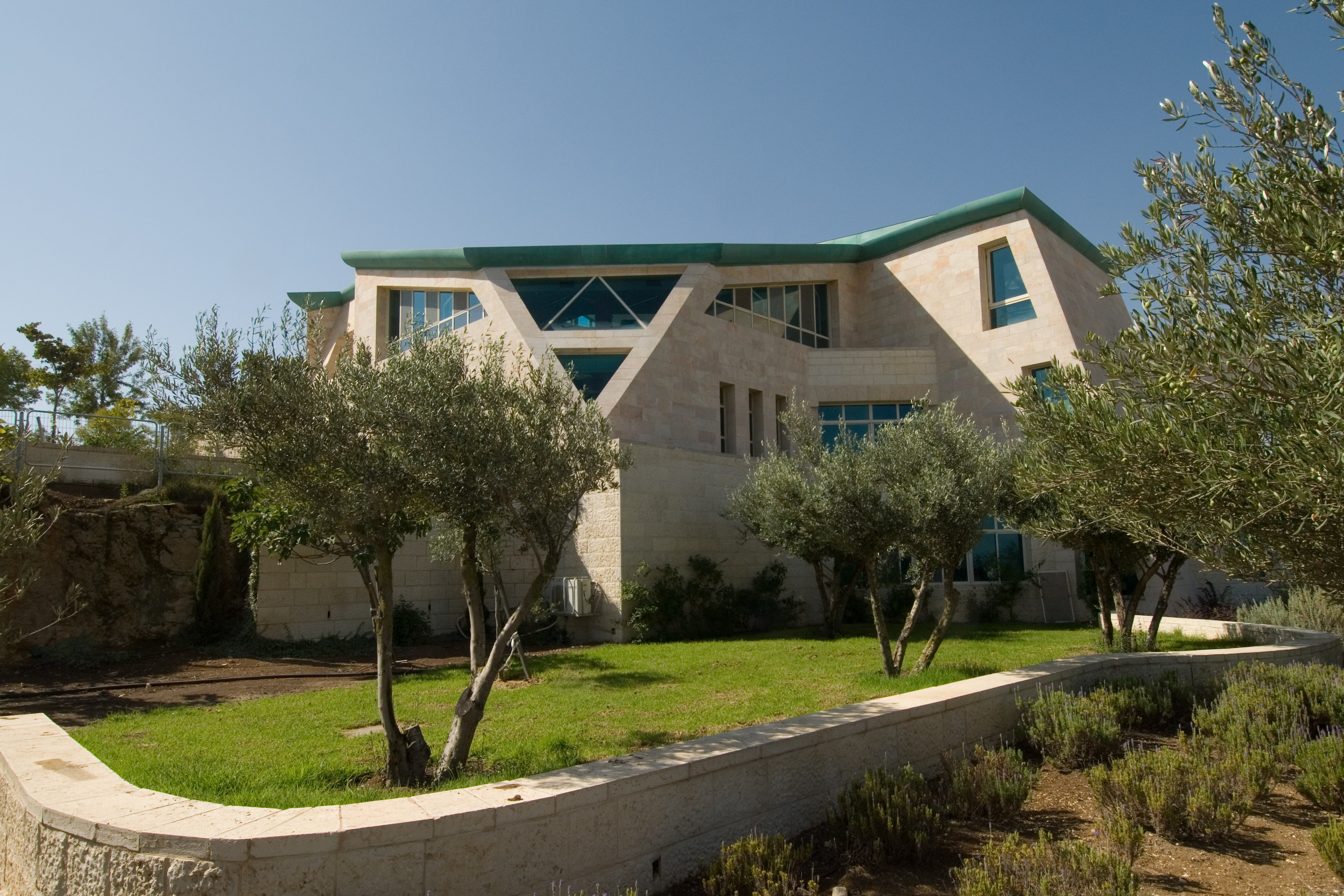
Migdal Oz (seminary)

Located in Migdal Oz is the Migdal Oz Beit Midrash which is headed by Esti Rosenberg and operates under the auspices of Yeshivat Har Etzion. The seminary building also houses the women's campus of the Herzog College, which prepares its students for teaching. The college teaches 14 subjects.

In January 2013, the Israel Defense Forces arrested a Palestinian who admitted to firing a gun in the direction of a security post at the entrance of Migdal Oz, not hurting anyone. In 2019, an 18-year-old boy, Dvir Sorek, was stabbed to death in the settlement by two Palestinian men.

== Archeology ==
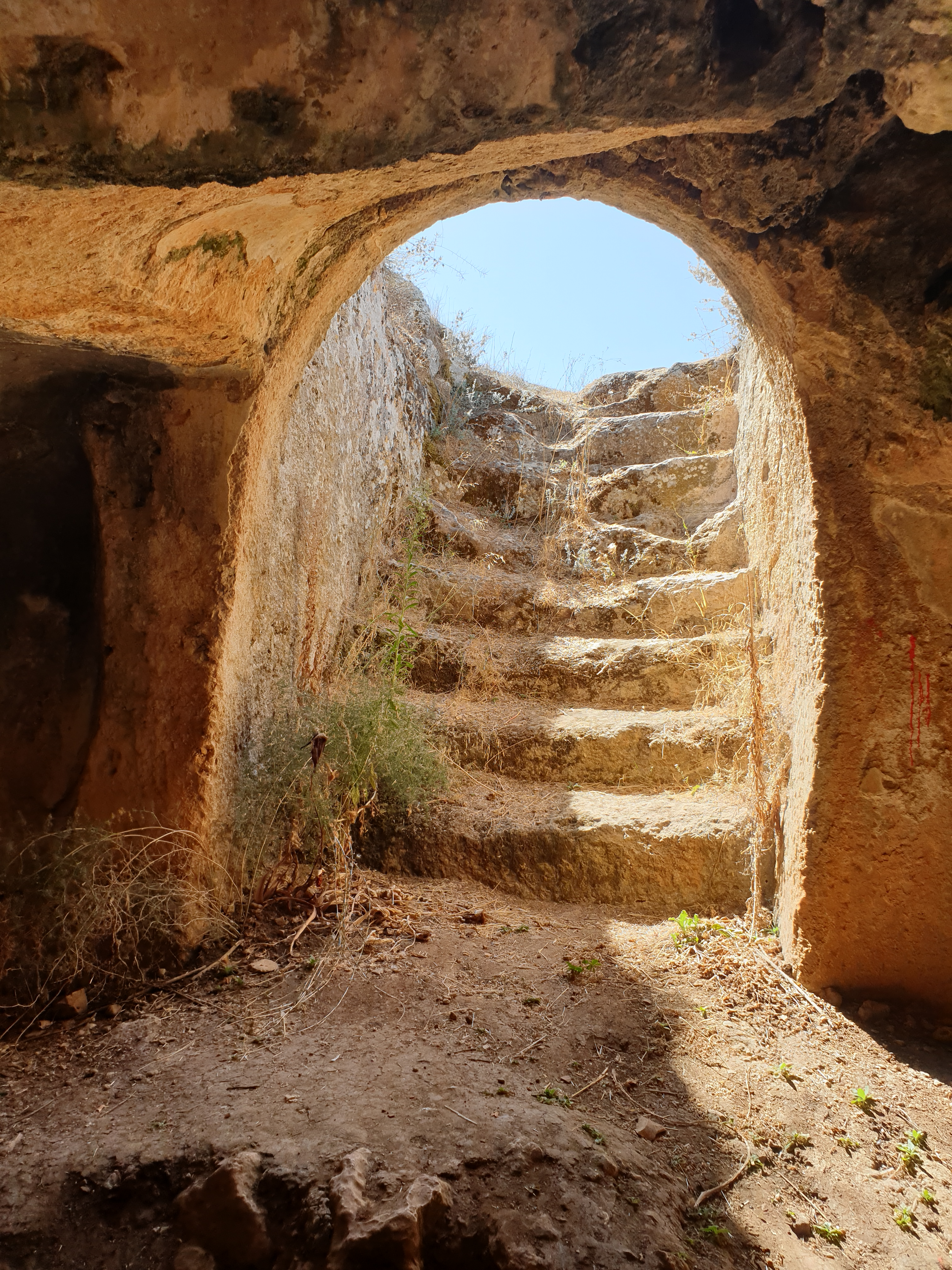
Mikveh entrance and stairs

Within the area of the Kibbutz is the hill known as Horvat Brachot, where the remains of second temple Jewish settlement was found. It includes mikvahs, hiding caves, ruined houses among them an intact inkwell was found from that period. Alongside it are the remains of a Byzantine church dated to the fifth century AD, which includes mosaic floors that are now preserved and displayed at the Israel Museum and The Good Samaritan Museum

== Economy ==
Its main agricultural pursuits include three turkey coops with 16,000 birds apiece, a dairy housing 260 cows that is among the largest in the country, and fruit orchards. Along with neighbouring Gush Etzion, Rosh Tzurim, and Kfar Etzion, Migdal Oz jointly farms six square kilometers of olive groves near Kiryat Malakhi and Lakhish in the shfelah.

Migdal Oz is also home to some high tech and light industry. The eponymous Migdal Oz seminary, an advanced women's beit midrash, was opened in 1997 in the Kibbutz
