= Alon Shvut =

Israeli settlement in the West Bank

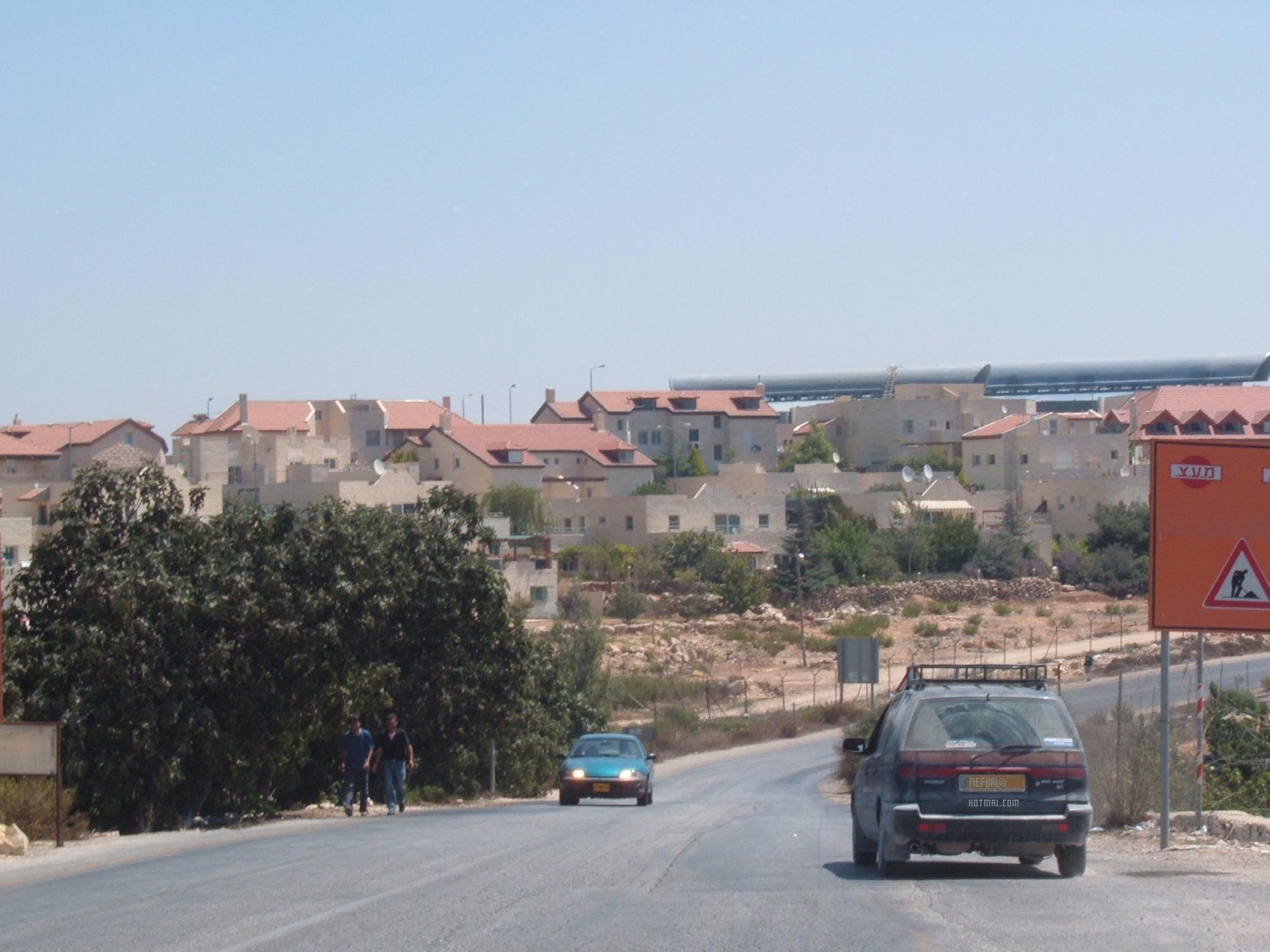
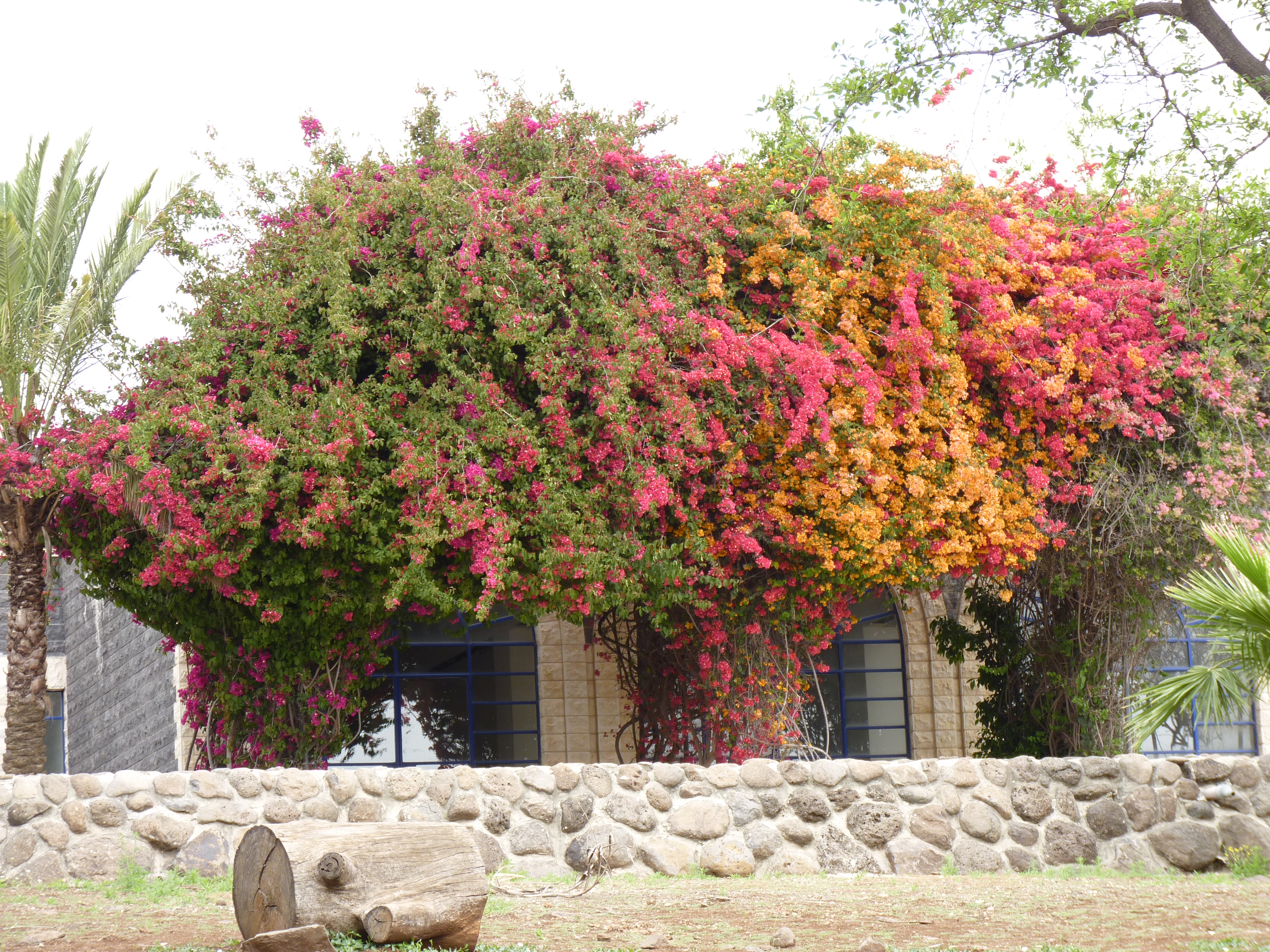
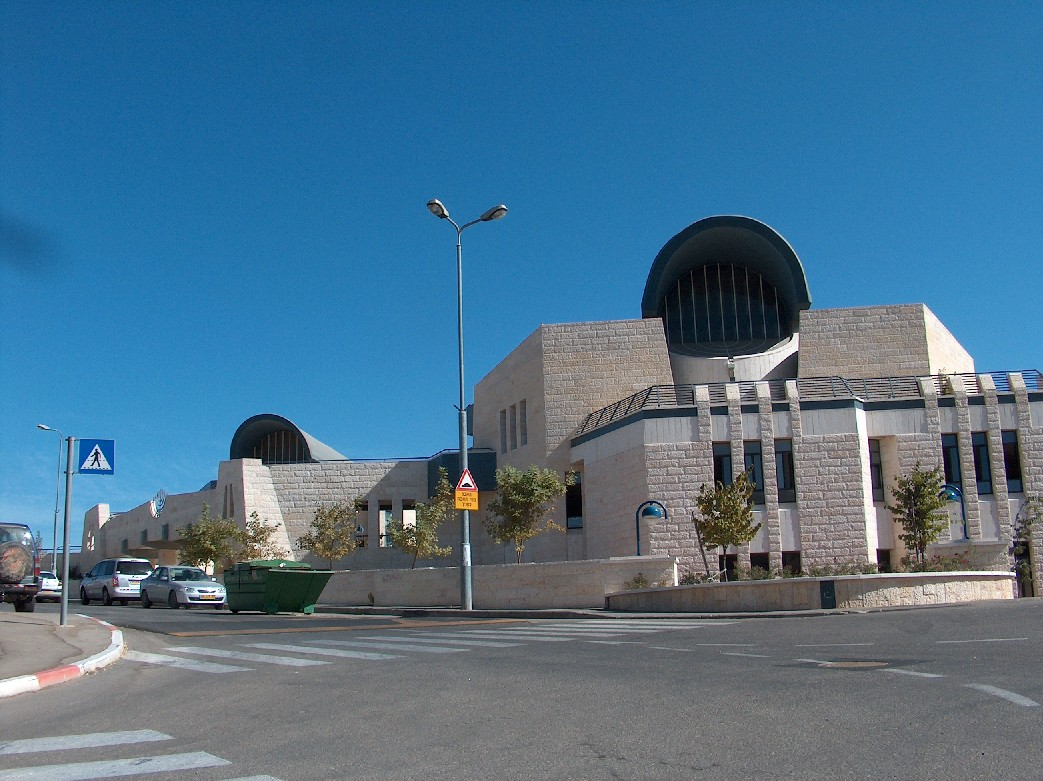
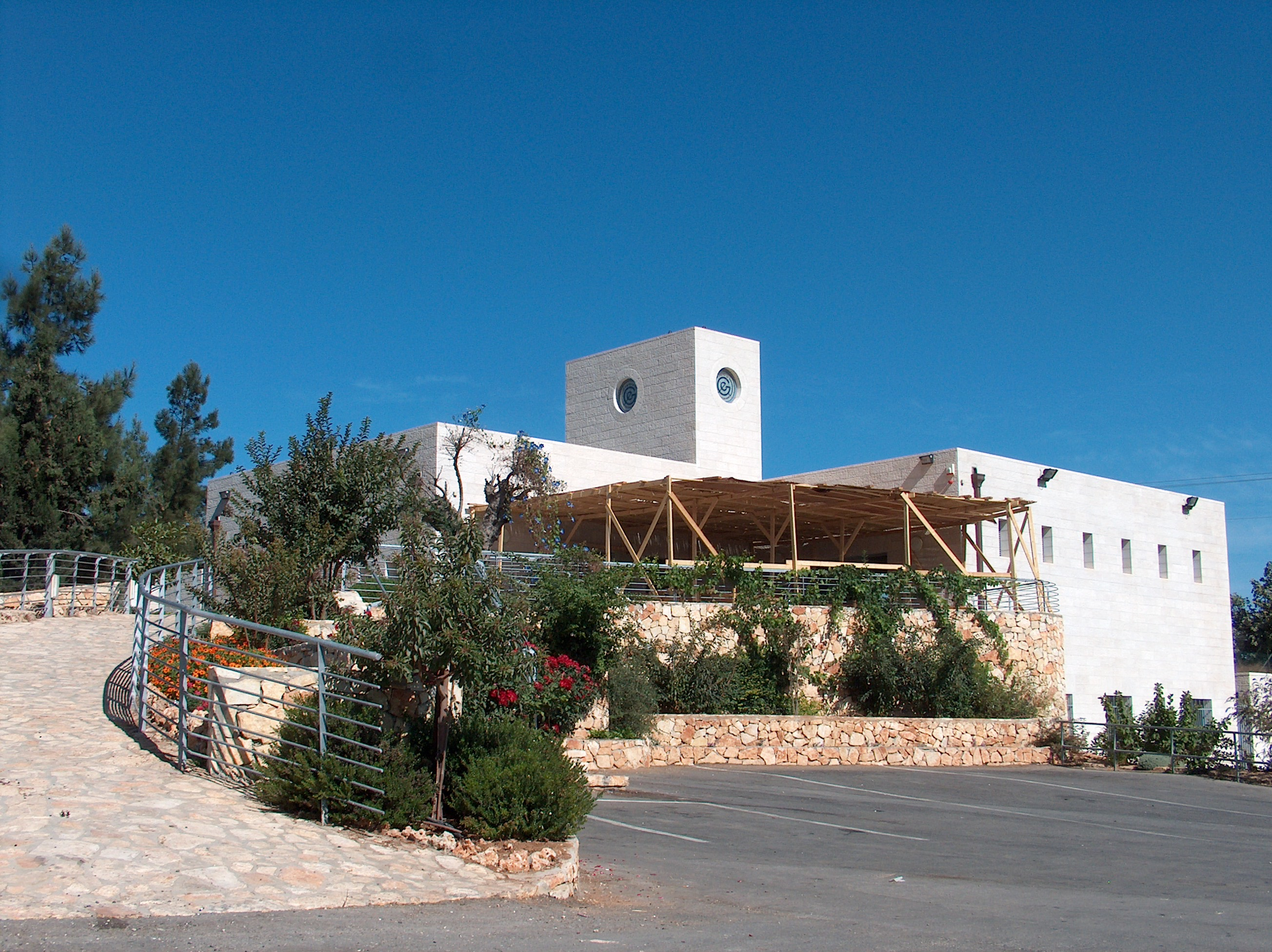
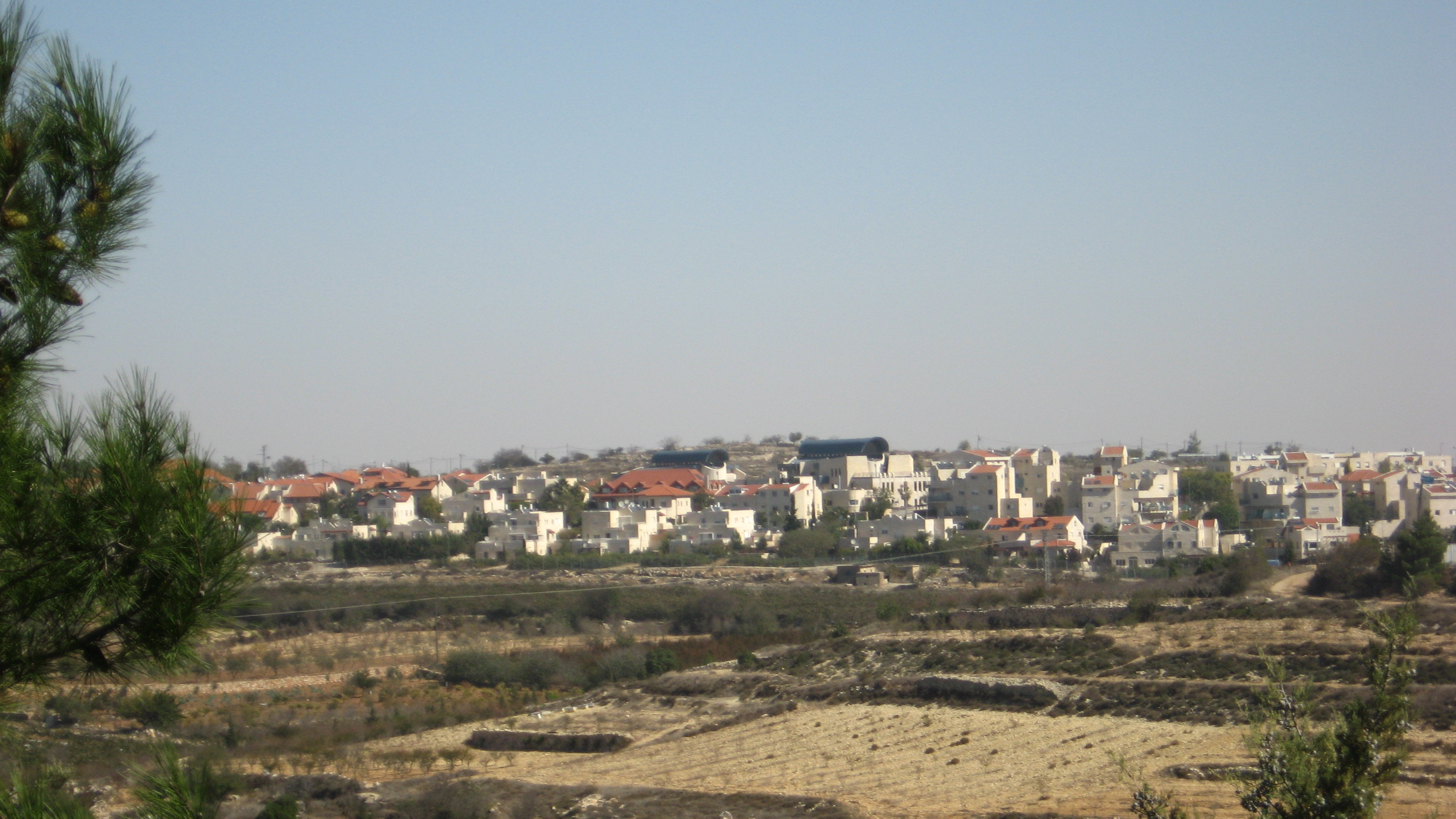
Alon Shvut: אַלּוֹן שְׁבוּת (Hebrew); ألون شفوت (Arabic)

Hebrew transcription(s)
  - Official: Allon Shevut
- Etymology: Oak of return
- Location within Israel Location within the West Bank Location within the Southern West Bank
- Coordinates: 31°39′17″N 35°7′40″E
- Grid position: 162/118 PAL
- Country: Palestine
- District: Judea and Samaria Area
- Council: Gush Etzion
- Region: West Bank
- Founded: 1970
- Population (2024): 3,141

Alon Shvut (Hebrew: אַלּוֹן שְׁבוּת) is an Israeli settlement in the West Bank, established in June 1970 over lands confiscated from the nearby Palestinian town of Khirbet Beit Zakariyyah. It is part of the Etzion bloc of the West Bank, administered by the Gush Etzion Regional Council, and neighbors the Israeli settlements of Kfar Etzion, Rosh Tzurim, Neve Daniel, Elazar, Bat Ayin, Migdal Oz, and Efrat. In 2024, its population was 3,141.

The international community considers Israeli settlements in the West Bank illegal under international law, but the Israeli government disputes this.

== Etymology ==
Alon Shvut, literally, "oak of return", is a reference to the return of the Jews expelled from Gush Etzion by the Jordanian Arab Legion in 1948 following the Kfar Etzion massacre. The 700-year-old Kermes Oak (Quercus calliprinos) is sacred to the Arabs with the name Ballutet el Yerzeh (oak of Yerzeh). It was a major landmark of Gush Etzion and became known as "lone oak". The town was constructed adjacent to the oak, which is considered a symbol of renewal and continuity. The oak is incorporated in the municipal emblem.

Yigal Allon, who sponsored the establishment of the town, said that the name was chosen in his honour.

== History ==
=== Megalithic stone tower ===
To the south of Beit Sawir were the remains of a megalithic stone tower of great antiquity but unknown purpose, described during the first two decades of the 20th century.

=== Hellenistic and Roman periods ===
Alon Shvut is located on the site of the Battle of Beth Zechariah, fought between the Maccabees and the Seleucid army after the defeat of the Seleucids in Jerusalem. The ancient town of Beit Zakariah, in northern Judea, is identified with the ruins of Khirbet Zechariah, less than a kilometer north of Alon Shvut. It was considered the nearest area to Jerusalem whose topography could be exploited by the Maccabees to block the northward advance of the Seleucid army, after the Maccabee defeat in the Battle of Beth Zur.

Alon Shvut sits on the ancient road to Jerusalem, which is still marked by Roman milestones. Many mikvehs believed to have been used by pilgrims on the way to the Temple in Jerusalem have been found in the surrounding hills. Dozens of ancient grape and olive presses, as well as cisterns hewn out of the bedrock, testify to a long history of agriculture.

The hill at the east end of Alon Shvut is known as Khirbet Beit Sawir (ruins of Beit Sawir) or in recent times Giv'at HaHish. An excavation by Yuval Peleg found a columbarium, a winepress and a ritual bath (mikveh) from the Hellenistic or Roman period.

=== Beit Sawir and Faghur ===
In 1596, Beit Sawir appeared in Ottoman tax registers as being in the Nahiya of Quds of the Liwa of Quds. It had a population of 8 Muslim households and paid taxes on wheat, barley, olives or vines or fruit trees, and goats or beehives. The much larger Arab village of Fagur was nearby to the north-east. In 1838 both Faghur and Beit Sawir were reported as "in ruins or deserted," likewise in the late 19th century.

=== Alon Shvut ===
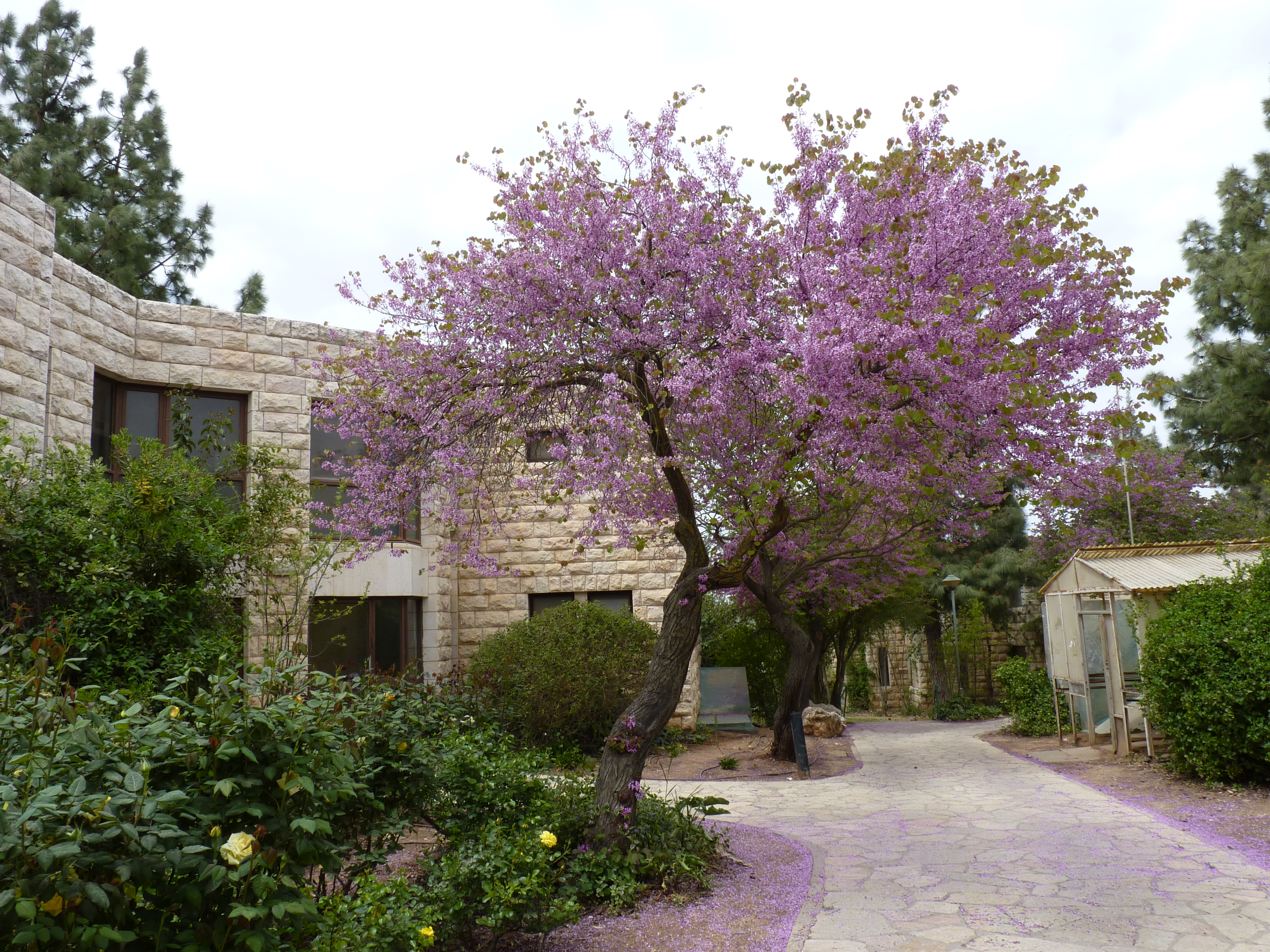
Alon Shvut in spring

Alon Shvut was planned by Moshe Moskovic, a member of Masu'ot Yitzhak, established in the Etzion Bloc before 1948. The army invited him back after the Six-Day War. He drew up a plan for the reconstruction of Gush Etzion as a regional centre, envisaging it as a hub for agricultural trade and tourism as well as educational institutions with dormitory facilities for students from all over the country. The educational structures would consist of (a) a High Yeshiva in a military framework (Nahal), (b) a Jewish study academy, (c) a seminar for activists, and (d) a school for teaching in Har Hevron (the Hebron Hills).

Yigal Allon became its political sponsor, and paved the way for the realization of Moskovic's programme, which was designed to replace the demolished Masu'ot Yitzhak with a new community, Alon Shvut. Funding came directly from the government, and from the Rothschild Foundation. Half of the surviving members of the prewar settlements of Masu'ot Yitzhak and Ein Tsurim, chose not to return. The first settlers moved in on 25 June 1970, and the official founding ceremony was held on 5 July.

According to ARIJ, Israel confiscated 920 dunams of land from the nearby Palestinian village of Khirbet Beit Zakariyyah in order to build Alon Shvut.

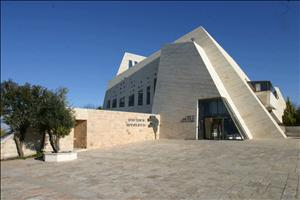
Yeshivat Har Etzion

From the outset, Alon Shvut was conceived of as a combined educational centre and a residential quarter for families associated with the then-nascent Yeshivat Har Etzion hesder yeshiva, an institution that by special arrangement with the government combines a five-year programme of religious study with army service. Graduates from these Gush Etzion yeshivot make up a disproportionately high percentage of fighting men in the elite units of Israel Defense Forces (IDF). It developed as a communal and service center in a predominantly agricultural region. For many years Alon Shvut housed the only health clinic, grocery, post office and bank in the area.

2014 Alon Shvut stabbing attack: On 10 November 2014, a Palestinian Muslim terrorist ran over three Jews at a bus stop at Alon Shvut. He then left his vehicle and stabbed all three while they were lying on the ground. One of the victims, 25- or 26-year-old occupational therapist Dahlia Lemkus, died of her wounds.

== Legal status ==
The international community considers Israeli settlements a violation of the Fourth Geneva Convention's prohibition on the transfer of an occupying power's civilian population into occupied territory and are as such illegal under international humanitarian law. Israel disputes that the Fourth Geneva Convention applies to the Palestinian territories as they had not been legally held by a sovereign prior to Israel taking control of them. Only the U.K. and Pakistan officially recognised the Hashemite Kingdom of Jordan's annexation of the West Bank with all other members of the UN remaining uncommitted. This view has been rejected by the International Court of Justice and the International Committee of the Red Cross.

According to Peace Now, 24.13% of Alon Shvut and the nearby Israeli outpost of Givat Hahish is built on Palestinian land. Yaacov Katz, former head of the local municipal council, says that the southern neighborhood of Alon Shvut was built on land purchased in the 1920s and on principle, the municipality only built on land proven to belong to Jews, adding, "Morally and ethically, that is how it should be done".

== Geography ==
Gush Etzion Regional Council building

Located in the northern Judean Hills at about 950 m above sea level, Alon Shvut is warm and dry in summer. Winters are mild, with rainfall and a few centimeters of snow about once a year. The old and new neighborhoods are contiguous, and lie on a northwest–southeast axis along the ridge of a hill, with a gradual plain descending to its south and dramatic gullies dropping to its north. The Givat HaHish neighborhood is on an extension of the ridge which abuts a gully to the northeast of the town.

Alon Shvut is located a few hundred meters west of the Gush Etzion Junction, where Route 60, the north–south artery which roughly follows the watershed from Nazareth through Jerusalem to Beersheba meets Route 367, which descends west into the Elah Valley to the coastal plain and Tel Aviv area. Travel time to Jerusalem is approximately 15 minutes.

== Demography ==
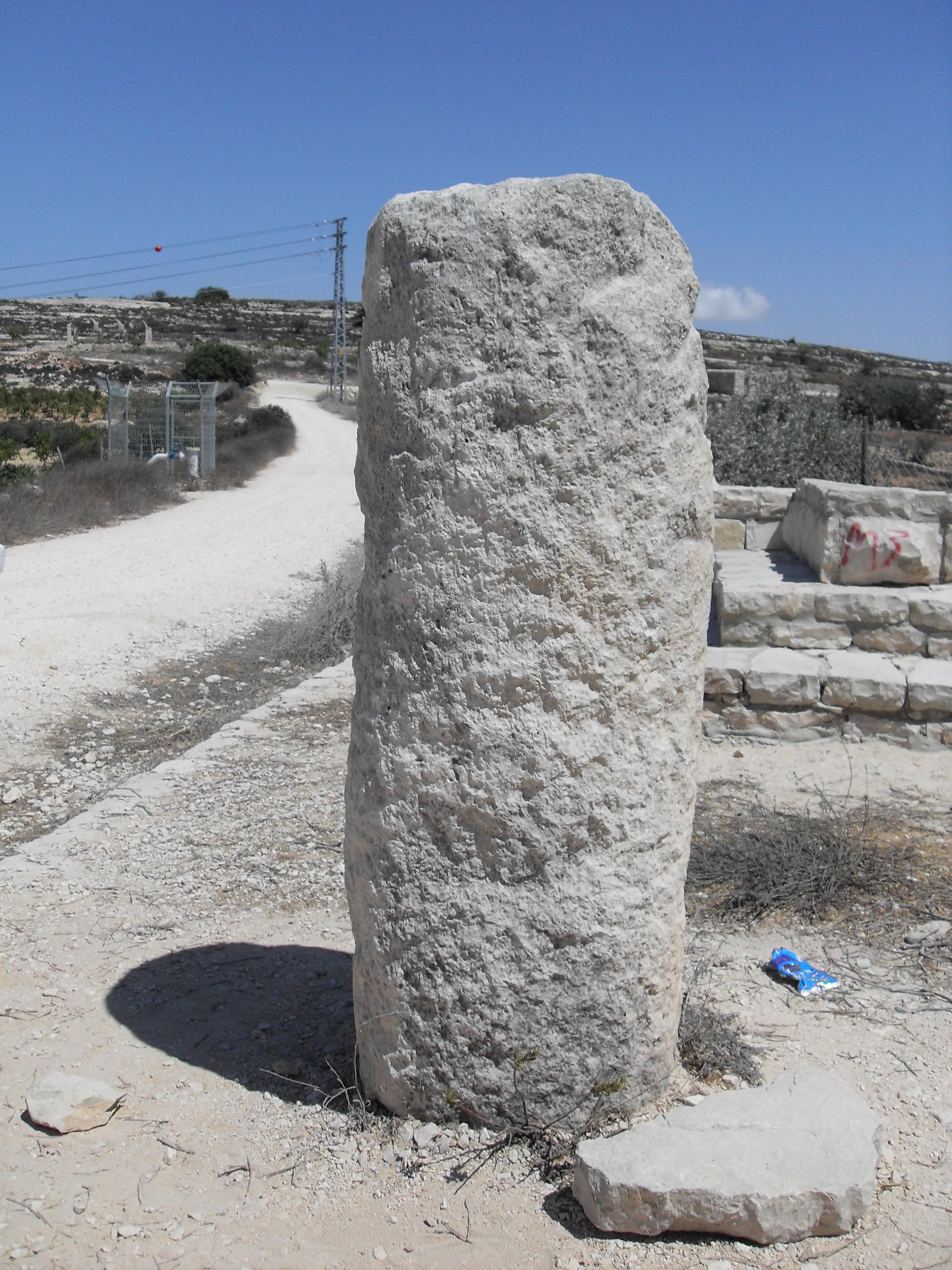
Roman milestone on Way of the Patriarchs on the outskirts of Alon Shvut

There are residents speaking English, Russian, German, French, Amharic, Spanish, and Portuguese, among other languages. In 2000, a second neighborhood doubled the size of the town to accommodate an increased demand for housing. Among the new residents were those who had been unable to acquire lots in the original neighborhood, as well as many young families that had moved to Israel from abroad ("made aliyah"), especially from the United States. In the summer 2002, a group of 90 Incan Jewish immigrants, former Christians who converted to Judaism and who hail from Trujillo, Peru moved into mobile homes on the site. Donna Rosenthal writes of this community:

Not all settlers were born Jewish; in summer 2002, Peruvian Indians left huts and were welcomed into new trailer homes in this Judean hills settlement. Although these former Christians have taken Hebrew names, they do not yet know the difference between Herzl and Hamas. The "Inca Jews" already have been taught the "holy trinity": the Torah, the People, the Land. And they call the West Bank of the Jordan river by its Biblical names, Judea and Samaria. "We knew we were coming to a place called 'territories' because we know other Peruvians who immigrated earlier and are living in the settlements," said a kippa-wearing convert who carried a Spanish-Hebrew prayer book. "But I have no problem because I don't consider the territories to be occupied. You cannot conquer what has belonged to you since the time of the patriarch Abraham."

A third neighbourhood is planned for the Giv'at HaHish (גִּבְעַת הָחִי"שׁ) area northeast of the town, named after the Haganah's Hish unit's operations there.

== Educational and religious institutions ==
Much of Alon Shvut's growth has been tied to the presence of Yeshivat Har Etzion. In addition to the families of faculty, many of its students have made their homes in the town. The yeshiva, housed in a large, white building overlooking the valley, also attracts many English-speaking students from around the world. Its founders are considered of the more moderate educators in the Hesder Yeshiva program and have gained a reputation of tolerance and modernity for the institute. Alon Shvut rabbinical school encouraged the family of a yeshiva student killed in a Tel Aviv Hamas bus bombing incident to donate his organs, and a Palestinian girl was the recipient of his liver. The teachers are respected authorities on biblical commentary, traditional law and Jewish philosophy. Herzog College for Teachers is located in Alon Shvut. Tsomet Institute is a research institute based in Alon Shvut that seeks ways of reconciling Jewish law with modern technology to enable hospitals, police, fire departments, and the military to carry out their duties on Sabbath.

== Economy ==
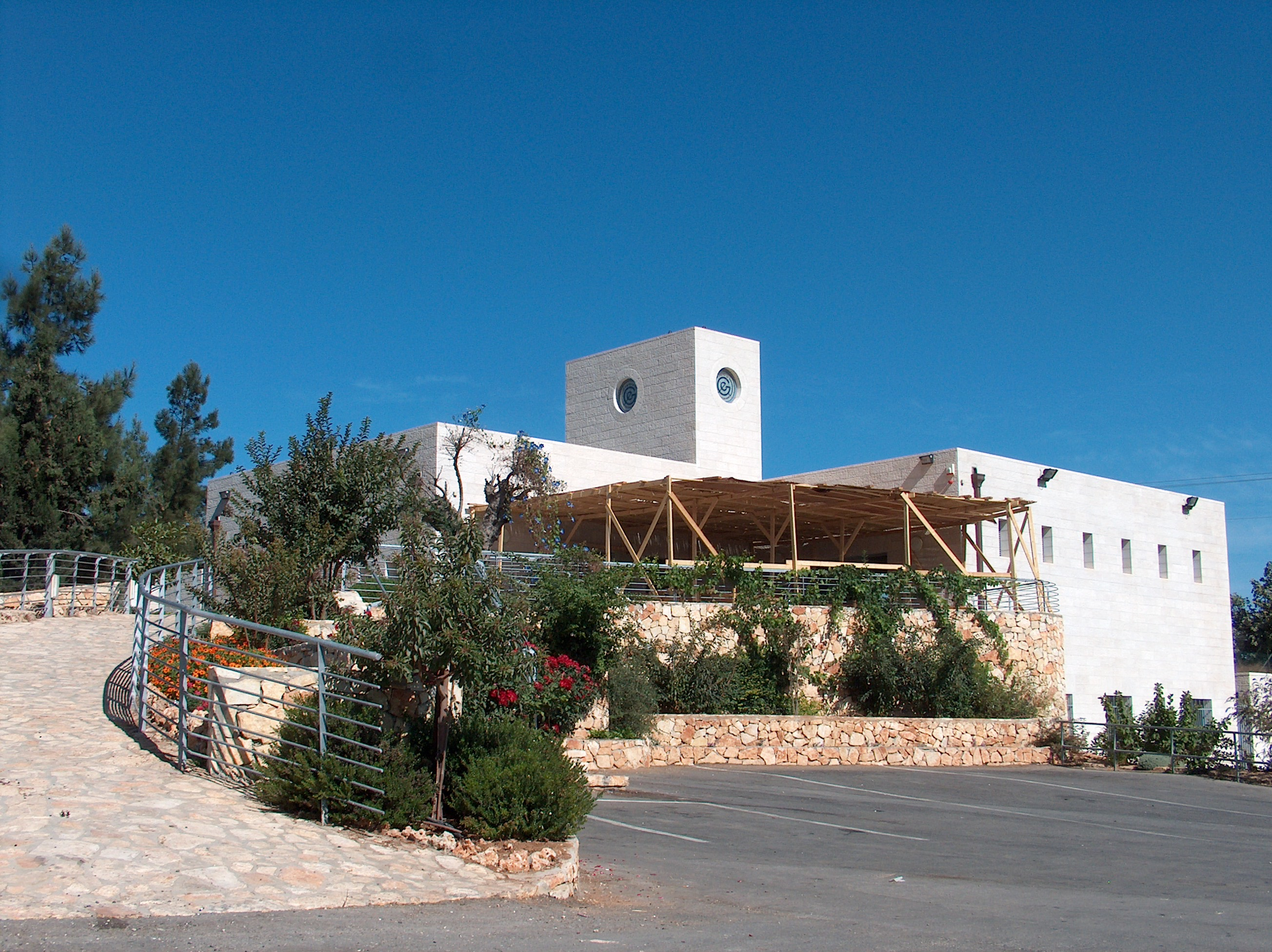
Gush Etzion Winery near Alon Shvut

The Lone Tree microbrewery, established in 2010, is located in Alon Shvut. In 2007, the Gush Etzion winery, a modern facility on the road to Alon Shvut, won a gold medal for its Cabernet Franc in the annual Mediterranean International Wine and Spirit Challenge, also known as Terravino.

== Local culture ==
The annual Bible-learning seminar at Herzog College is a 5-day event that attracts thousands of participants from all over the country. In 2010, over 100 leading scholars delivered 150 lectures. In 2011, the seminar drew 5,000 participants and offered 200 lectures in such subjects as Biblical archaeology, hermeneutics, linguistics, poetry, history, geography, kabbalah, and Jewish law.

Use of the local Olympic-size swimming pool is conducted on a gender-segregated basis.

Alon Shvut and the neighboring community of Neve Daniel are linked by a path called Derech Ha’Avot (Way of the Patriarchs).

== Voting Patterns ==
In the 2026 election, 65 percent of voters in Alon Shvut voted for the parties of the right-wing coalition led by Benjamin Netanyahu, while 17 percent voted for the parties of the center-left coalition led by Gadi Eisenkot. An additional 4.5 percent voted for the Reservists, and 10.1 percent voted for Amcha Yisrael. The Arab parties did not receive any votes. Voter turnout increased 13 percent from the 2022 election.

== See also ==
- 2014 Alon Shvut stabbing attack
- Israeli wine
