= Battle of Beth Zechariah =

Battle in 162 BC

Coordinates: 31°39′50.40″N 35°07′23.70″E

- Part of the Maccabean Revolt
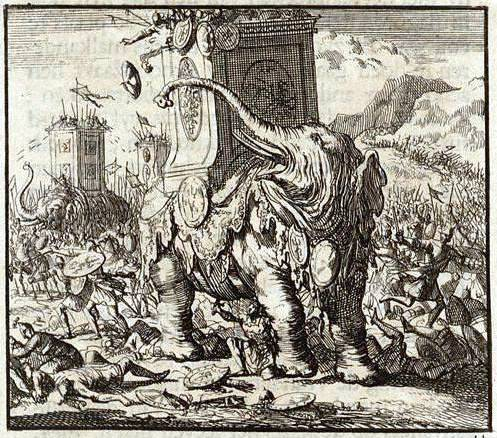
- 1698 illustration of Eleazar fighting an elephant at the battle by Jan Luyken
Date	May 162 BC
Location	Beth-Zechariah, near modern day Alon Shvut, West Bank
Result	Seleucid victory

Belligerents
Maccabean army	Seleucid Empire

Commanders and leaders
Judas Maccabeus; Eleazar Avaran †	Lysias

Strength
est. 10,000–20,000	est. 50,000 infantry, 30 war elephants, 5,000 cavalry

The Battle of Beth Zechariah took place around May 162 BC during the Maccabean revolt fought between Jewish rebels under the leadership of Judas Maccabeus (Judah Maccabee) against an army of the Seleucid Empire, the Greek successor state (diadochi) to the Macedonian conquests that controlled Syria and Babylonia. The battle was fought at Beth Zechariah (modern Khirbet Beit Zakariyyah) and was a Seleucid victory, with the rebels driven from the field in retreat. Judas's brother Eleazar Avaran died in combat with a war elephant. The defeat allowed the Seleucids to continue their campaign and besiege the Jewish holy city of Jerusalem.

== Primary sources ==
The Battle of Beth Zechariah is recorded in the book of 1 Maccabees (1 Maccabees 6:28–47) and in two of Josephus's histories: Antiquities of the Jews Book 12, Chapter 9 and The War of the Jews Book 1.1.41–46. 1 Maccabees is considered the main source on the battle; its detailed description of the Seleucid forces suggests that the author either was an eyewitness, or was able to interview an eyewitness in detail. Antiquities largely echoes 1 Maccabees, Josephus's main source, although he adds additional details based on his first-hand knowledge of Judean topography and geography; War of the Jews contains new material that is absent from and sometimes contradicts 1 Maccabees, however, suggesting other Greek sources were used by Josephus in its composition, such as Nicolaus of Damascus.

2 Maccabees describes Lysias's expedition in very general terms (2 Maccabees 13:13–26), although it focuses on a raid undertaken by Judas at night as well as a Jewish traitor Rhodocus who was caught passing secrets to the Seleucids. It seems the author knew the truth of the battle as 2 Maccabees describes Lysias's eventual retreat as due to political concerns and not the result of a military defeat, and did not want to linger on an embarrassing setback for the rebellion. 2 Maccabees also dates the expedition to 149 SE (163 BC), slightly earlier than 1 Maccabees; which date is preferred is disputed by scholars.

== Background ==
In autumn 164 BC, Regent Lysias launched an expedition to Judea to defeat the Maccabean rebellion. The Maccabees under Judas Maccabeus fought the Greeks at the Battle of Beth Zur. Whether from losses in the battle or from news of the death of King Antiochus IV reaching Judea, Lysias left Judea and negotiated a compromise. He returned to the Seleucid capital of Antioch to fend off a political challenge for leadership from Philip (Greek: Philippus), a prominent Seleucid official from Media in the eastern half of the Empire who claimed Antiochus IV had appointed him regent before his death. The Maccabees captured Jerusalem, cleansed the temple, and rededicated the altar for Jewish worship. However, Seleucid forces still controlled the Acra, a strong fortress within the city that faced the Temple Mount. The Maccabees participated in a number of campaigns across greater Palestine while the Seleucid government was concerned with internal politics in the capital. Around April 162 BC (Year 150 of the Ancient Macedonian calendar), Judas laid siege to the Acra, attempting to eradicate the most prominent symbol of Seleucid power in Judea. This drew a strong Seleucid response: Lysias left Antioch and made a second expedition to Judea to relieve the Acra. (Note: Some scholars believe that Lysias only made a single expedition to Judea, as 2 Maccabees suggests the Battle of Beth Zur happened after the cleansing of the temple, and that Lysias's expedition happened in 149 SE by the Macedonian version of the year count (rather than 150 SE by the Babylonian version). In this scenario, the events of the first expedition happen immediately before the Battle of Beth Zechariah. Still, most scholars favor the 1 Maccabees version of two expeditions separated by two years.)

An issue both sides would struggle with was food shortages. The sources say that it was a fallow year previously; the exact implications of that statement are unclear, but it appears food supplies were thin if not at famine level. The problem had been exacerbated by a wave of Jewish refugees from outlying regions that had been brought to Judea for their own safety as the outlying regions descended into disorder with raids and civilian violence and murders between the Jewish and Gentile populations. Lysias's expeditionary force was quite large, and armies acquired a substantial amount of their provisions from local foraging and requisitions in antiquity.

According to Josephus, the Seleucids had an army of about 50,000 infantry, about 5,000 cavalry, and approximately 80 war elephants. 1 Maccabees describes an even larger infantry army but only 32 elephants; historians generally take the lesser and assume Josephus was more accurate on his infantry estimate, and 1 Maccabees was more accurate on the number of elephants. The size of the Jewish army is unknown, but they appear to have trained a Hellenistic-style army in the year and a half since taking Jerusalem, as Josephus mentions a Jewish phalanx. Historians speculate that the Jews may have had anywhere from 10,000 to 20,000 soldiers.

== Lysias's expedition ==
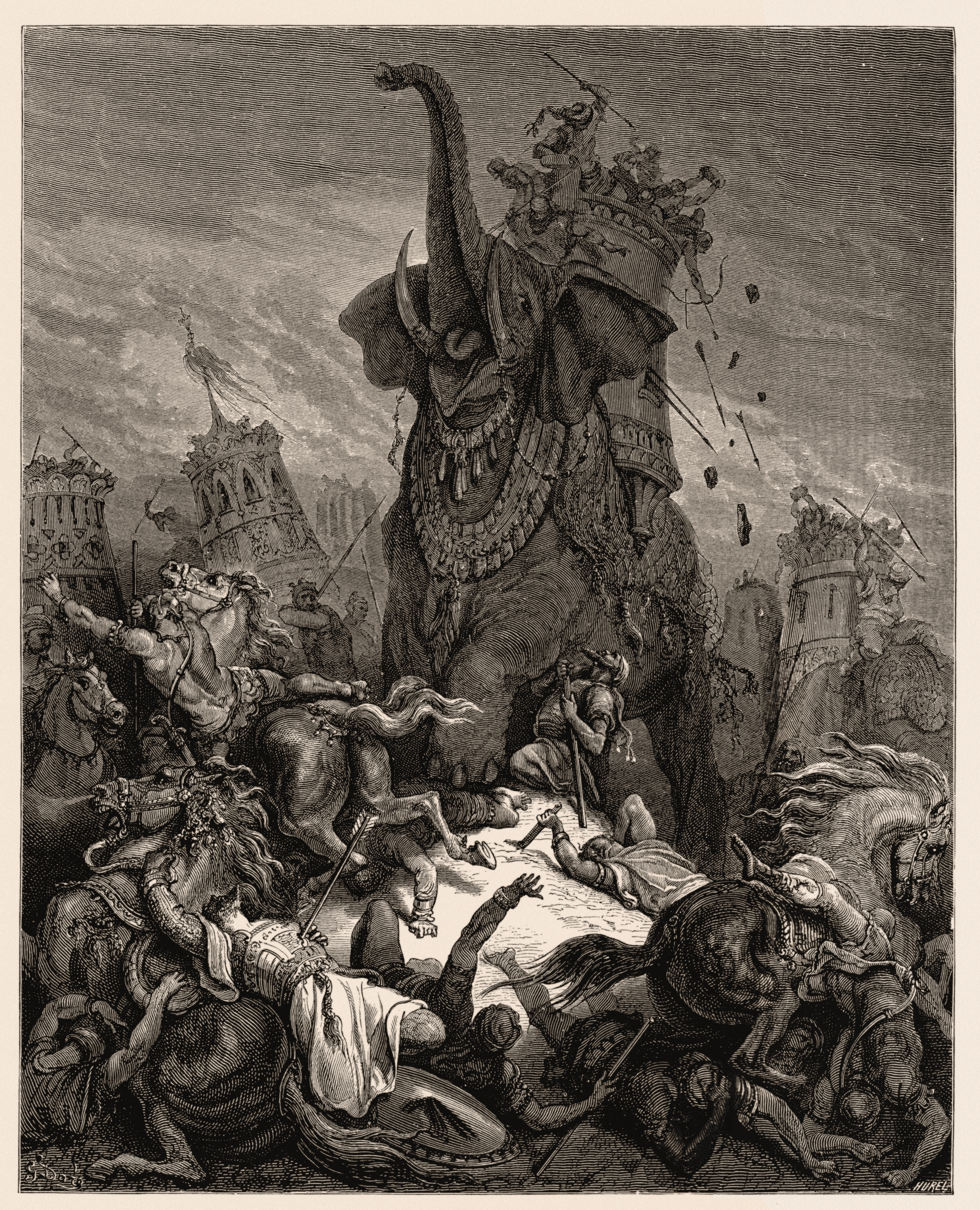
Eleazar Avaran trampled by a war elephant. Adasa would be the last battle with significant war elephant use for the Seleucids, as the Romans would hamstring the remaining elephants in the next months. Illustration by Gustave Doré in 1866.

Lysias and the Seleucid army of Syrian Greeks approached Judea from the southwest through Mount Hebron and besieged Beth-zur. After Beth-zur surrendered, they continued northward toward Jerusalem, about 32 kilometres (20 mi) away. Judas declined to revert to the guerrilla tactics of earlier in the revolt, as this would likely mean ceding southern Judea and Jerusalem without contest. Instead, he rallied an army to intercept the expedition and positioned his troops on the high ground on the main road to Jerusalem. The Seleucids would be required to enter via a valley approach, restricting their numeral advantage. Near the end of May 162 BC, the two armies clashed at a narrow pass near Beth Zechariah.

Lysias sent a force to take the nearby ridges to cover his main force's advance and their flanks, likely his cavalry and possibly skirmishers. The high ground there would also provide scouting and better visibility to the battle's progress. The bulk of the troops marched through the valley path with light infantry at the front, and war elephants and the heavy infantry, a Greek phalanx armed with sarissas, behind. The light infantry could remove any obstacles found in the elephant's path, and slow any surprise attack on the formation.

The war elephants unnerved Judas's troops. As the Jews began to break for the rear, Judas's brother, Eleazar Avaran, attempted to show his fellow soldiers that the elephants were vulnerable. Charging into the mouth of the Syrian forces, he attacked a large elephant. Eleazar cast himself under the animal and thrust his sword into its belly. The elephant crushed Eleazar, killing him, although the elephant eventually perished as well. This show of bravery was not enough to rally the Jewish forces, which collapsed under the heavy pressure of the Greek phalanx. The Maccabees retreated to mountainous and defensible Aphairema, near the original center of the revolt.

Lysias marched north to Jerusalem and laid siege to the rebel forces there. However, Lysias was limited by time: he could not spend too long away from the capital without risking his position as leader. Both sides were running short on food. The siege eventually ended with a peace deal: Lysias agreed to end his siege of Jerusalem, and the Maccabees ended their siege of the Acra. Lysias confirmed the repeal of Antiochus IV's anti-Jewish decrees. The Greeks also tore down a defensive wall at "Mount Zion", possibly referring to the Temple Mount. With the peace deal in place, Lysias was able to return to Antioch to fend off a renewed challenge from Philip for leadership of the Seleucid empire and guardianship of the young Antiochus V Eupator. He left around June or July 162 BC, although he may have sent some of his forces back earlier. According to Josephus, Philip was captured and executed; it is unknown whether Josephus had some unknown and lost source for Philip's eventual fate, or this was simply a conjecture based on the fact that Philip never did attain leadership of the Empire.

== Analysis ==
2 Maccabees 13:2 writes that 300 scythed chariots were deployed as part of the expedition. As scythed chariots were generally used for lowland combat on flat plains, this information is doubtful; the ground in Judea is not very level, and it would be difficult to accelerate the chariots to the speed needed to make them effective. It is uncertain that the Seleucids even had so many chariots to send even if they wanted to. Neither 1 Maccabees nor Josephus mention chariots, both sources more interested in military details than 2 Maccabees is. Polybius describes 140 chariots at the military parade at Daphne in 166–165 BC, but does not indicate scythes on them; it is possible that these were merely ceremonial and utilitarian chariots meant for normal transportation rather than warfare.

1 Maccabees describes a larger army than Josephus does, saying that the expedition consisted of one hundred thousand foot-soldiers, twenty thousand horsemen, and thirty-two elephants. Scholars believe these numbers grossly exaggerated - such manpower likely exceeds the entire Seleucid army, and if actually sent, would have been even more of a logistics nightmare to feed and supply than Josephus's suggestion of 50,000 infantry and 5,000 cavalry. The number of elephants is more unclear; Josephus writes that eighty elephants were with the expedition, although historian Bezalel Bar-Kochva argues for a lower figure. He suggests that Josephus might have misread an "8" (an Eta) as an "80" (a Pi) and notes that only 36–42 elephants were recorded by Polybius at the Daphne parade. Since elephants do not reproduce while in captivity and new elephants were likely difficult to procure due to losses in Seleucid territories closest to India, it is unlikely the Seleucids would have sent nearly all of those elephants that survived to 162 BCE to Judea, making a lower estimate more reasonable.

A point of uncertainty on the conflict between Eleazar and the elephant is that 1 Maccabees writes that "the king" was on the elephant that Eleazar attacked. The ten-year old king is not described as accompanying the expedition, though. It is possible that king really referred to regent, and Eleazar somehow thought that Lysias or some other important commander must have been on the elephant, perhaps due to some impressive royal seal or decoration; if he did, this belief was likely incorrect, as Hellenistic commanders almost always rode on horses in the style of Alexander the Great. 1 Maccabees also describes the elephant as dying "instantly"; this is likely an exaggeration from the fog of war. The elephant may have eventually died, but as elephant hunters can attest to, they do not die quickly or easily. With the technology of the era, only an arrow fired nearly point-blank from a powerful bow to the brain or heart could instantly fell an elephant, and even a grave abdominal wound could take a few hours to bleed the elephant to death.

A final point of uncertainty is when Alcimus would come to power as High Priest. According to 1 Maccabees, it is only after Demetrius I Soter comes to power, suggesting a later date of 162–161 BC. However, 2 Maccabees suggests Alcimus was appointed during Antiochus V's reign. If the version in 2 Maccabees is trusted, then it is possible that Lysias arranged for Alcimus to be High Priest as part of the peace deal that concluded his expedition.

== Legacy ==
The use of war elephants was possibly banned by the Treaty of Apamea, the peace treaty that ended the Roman–Seleucid War in 188 BC which had required the Seleucids to give up their war elephants. The Seleucids generally considered the Treaty to only apply to the elephants they handed over at the time, however. The Romans sent a delegation in 162 BC a few months after the battle, and interpreting the treaty in the harshest possible way, they hamstrung the remaining elephants they could find and burnt some Seleucid warships. As a result, this battle was one of the last ones where the Seleucids could deploy a major force of war elephants; their use afterward was rarer.

The Maccabees were a more common topic in Christian art and literature than Jewish works from the Roman era to the Industrial age, as the Hasmoneans were not well-regarded by the Jewish rabbis and sages who compiled the Jewish canon after the fall of the Hasmonean kingdom for a number of reasons. Eleazar was seen in Christian works as prefiguring Jesus Christ for his selfless sacrifice. European Christian artists also made works at least partially due to the opportunity to draw an elephant, an exotic and exciting subject in the medieval and Renaissance era.

Jews did eventually return to the topic of the Maccabean Revolt, but largely in the 19th and 20th centuries. Eleazar's heroism was commemorated in a Hanukkah coin issued by the Bank of Israel in 1961.

The town of Elazar in the West Bank was named after the son of Mattathias, since it is on the road to Beit Zur (near present-day Karmei Tzur and the Arab town of Halhul). The small Arab hamlet of Hirbeit Zakariya (sitting on an ancient Byzantine site), and the large single oak tree of Alon Shvut, are the location of ancient Zechariah / Zakariya.
