= Battle of 3 Shevat =

Coordinates: 31.65962°N 35.12437°E

- Part of the 1947-48 civil war in Mandatory Palestine and the 1947-1949 Palestine war
Date	January 14, 1948
Location	Gush Etzion, Mandatory Palestine
Result	Palestinian Arab failure

Belligerents
(Kingdom of Hejaz) Army of the Holy War	(Israel) Haganah

Commanders and leaders
Abd al-Qadir al-Husayni	Uzi Narkiss; Moshe Dayan

Strength
400 fighters	Unknown

Casualties and losses
100 killed 104 wounded	3 killed

The Battle of 3 Shevat took place during the 1947–1949 Palestine war on January 14, 1948 (Hebrew date: 3 Shevat).

The battle began with a large attack on Gush Etzion by Arab groups in the area, reinforced by Arabs and Bedouins who came from as far as Jerusalem and Beer Sheva, under the command of Abd al-Qadir al-Husayni. They attempted to capture the center of Gush Etzion, and to divide the four settlements of Gush Etzion into two separate enclaves and destroy them. Their attack was repulsed, at the cost of heavy losses to the attackers.

== Background ==
At this point, Gush Etzion consisted of four Jewish communities: Kfar Etzion, Ein Tzurim, Masu'ot Yitzhak, and Revadim.

Beginning in December 1947, there was a gradual escalation of hostilities between Gush Etzion residents and nearby Arabs. On December 11, the Convoy of Ten was ambushed, at the cost of 10 lives. Jewish revenge activities for this and other attacks included the destruction of Arab cars and buses.

Several days before January 14, Hagana intelligence reported the presence of numerous non-local Arabs in the area, gathered with the intention of attacking and destroying the Gush Etzion communities.

== The attack ==
Abd al-Qadir al-Husayni sent a force of 400 armed and trained fighters to the area, and they were joined by armed locals. The plan was to close the roads to prevent Jewish reinforcements from arriving, to conquer Kfar Etzion, to occupy Beit Zakariah to split up Gush Etzion and control the main road, and finally to conquer the remaining three communities. Al-Husseini went from place to place in his jeep to organize the various units from the attack. Many Arabs arrived from the Hebron area, some to take part in battle, and others to plunder afterwards. They arrived with their women and children, and with bags and baskets, in order to gather plunder.

Arab forces ambushed farmers from Ein Tzurim, firing on them. When the farmers fled to Ein Tzurim, the Arabs turned to attack Beit Zakariah. The conquered the "Russian mountain". But when they tried to advance towards Kfar Etzion, they were fired upon and retreated. They then tried to attack Kfar Etzion from three sides, but heavy fire was directed at them and they retreated again.

Meanwhile, Uzi Narkiss (the commander in Kfar Etzion) send urgent messages to Palmach and Hish commanders in Jerusalem, wanting them to ask the British army to intervene and stop the attack.

Beit Zakariah was the most strategically important point, as its conquest would split Gush Etzion into two and make its conquest easier. This was a small Arab village whose residents abandoned it after the Convoy of Ten battle, out of fear of Jewish retaliation (this was the first Palestinian village to be abandoned in the entire war). Arab forces then turned their attack on Beit Zakariah. The Jewish defenders retreated once their ammunition ran out. Jewish commander Aryeh Amit (Tepper), who was leading Palmach and Hish forces out of Ein Tzurim and Revadim, encountered the retreating defenders, and forced them to return to Beit Zakariah under threat of being shot by the Palmach.

== The counter-attack ==
At this point it became clear that the main Arab attack was on Beit Zakariah. Tepper noticed that the Arabs had sat down to rest and eat. He saw 300 Arab fighters organized in two rows with green flags, ready to storm Beit Zakariah. Tepper then launched a surprised attack on them. The Arabs fled hastily, leaving behind dozens of dead. Husseini then sent a force to counter-attack, but Tepper had already withdrawn his forces from the area, and Husseini's forces attacked empty positions. Meanwhile, Jewish forces attacked from a different direction, chasing the Arab forces to an open field where heavy fire was concentrated on them. The battle continued until dark, and then the Jewish forces returned to Kfar Etzion.

== Consequences ==
Only three Jewish fighters were killed in the battle, compared to over 200 Arab fighters. British authorities knew about the battle, but chose not to intervene. The British police commander in Hebron said that he learned of the attack only around midday, when he saw Arabs celebrating in Hebron. The Arabs claimed that Kfar Etzion and Revadim had been destroyed.

The battle was a disappointment for the Arabs - local Arabs feared a Jewish reprisal, the High Arab Command was blamed for neglecting its soldiers, the Husseini family lost status, and local Arabs began to rely on the Arab Liberation Army rather than serving as an independent military force. Yigal Yadin said of this battle, "It was one of our greatest victories, a mighty victory under the circumstances of those days, and relative to the weakness of our forces." Yigal Alon wrote that the counter-attack was the most successful of the entire war.

The Arabs tried to hide the extent of the defeat. The Shai intelligence unit gathered the names of 100 dead and 104 wounded among the Arab fighters, and published their names in Arabic on the Hagana radio station. Gush Etzion was not attacked again until April 12, 1948. Due to this defeat, Husseini cancelled his plans to attack Jewish communities, and focused on attacks on the roads.

Meanwhile, Gush Etzion remained isolated and lacking in military equipment, and without medical resources for the wounded. The Convoy of 35 were intended to reinforce the Gush Etzion defenses, and they carried medical equipment with them.
