= Shivat Zion (organisation) =

Israeli non-profit

- שיבת ציון
- Founder: Shraga Evers
- Type: Non-profit organisation
- Headquarters: Jerusalem
- Services: Assisting Jewish emigration to Israel and occupied Palestine
- Chief executive officer: Shraga Evers
- Website: shivat-zion.com

Shivat Zion (Hebrew: שיבת ציון) is an Israeli non-profit organisation founded in 2002 that provides assistance to Jews emigrating to Israel and Jewish settlements in Palestine. The name Shivat Zion means "return to Zion".

== History ==
Shivat Zion was founded by Shraga Evers, a Dutch-born Israeli, and began operations in February 2022. Evers said that Shivat Zion was established to address a lack of specialised support for prospective immigrants to Israel from non-English speaking Western Europe and Latin America. Its services were intended to complement those provided by the Jewish Agency for Israel, the Ministry of Aliyah and Integration and other organisations that help Jews emigrate to Israel. In July 2025, Shivat Zion announced an expansion of its immigrant support services to include people living in the United Kingdom.

== Controversy ==
In April 2026, Declassified UK reported that Shivat Zion was offering assistance to British Jews considering moving to Efrat, an Israeli settlement in the Gush Etzion area of the occupied West Bank. The report also stated that a representative of the organisation had discussed the possibility of donations benefiting from UK tax subsidies.

In the House of Commons, Clive Lewis asked the government whether sanctions should be imposed on charity officials in light of the Declassified UK reporting. The Foreign Office declined to speculate on potential sanctions.

Shivat Zion subsequently participated at a fair in London supporting British Jewish emigration to Israel, organised by the World Zionist Organization, the Jewish Agency for Israel, and Israel’s Aliyah and Integration Ministry, in May 2026. According to the Times of Israel (ToI), over 1,200 people participated in this fair. The ToI highlighted the nervousness of the community after the spate of recent attacks against the Jewish community, including the stabbing in Golders Green of two men, the Hatzola ambulance arson attack and the death of two people in an attack on a Manchester synagogue on Yom Kippur.

== Legal status ==
Shivat Zion describes itself as a non-profit organisation and states that it is an initiative of the Association for the Advancement of Giving and Social Progress in Israel (R.A.).

== See also ==
- Zionism
- Greater Israel
