= Khirbet Beit Zakariyyah =

Palestinian village in the West Bank close to Bethlehem

- Municipality type D (Village council)

ar transcription(s)
  - Arabic: خربة بيت زكريا
  - Latin: Khallet Sakarya (unofficial)
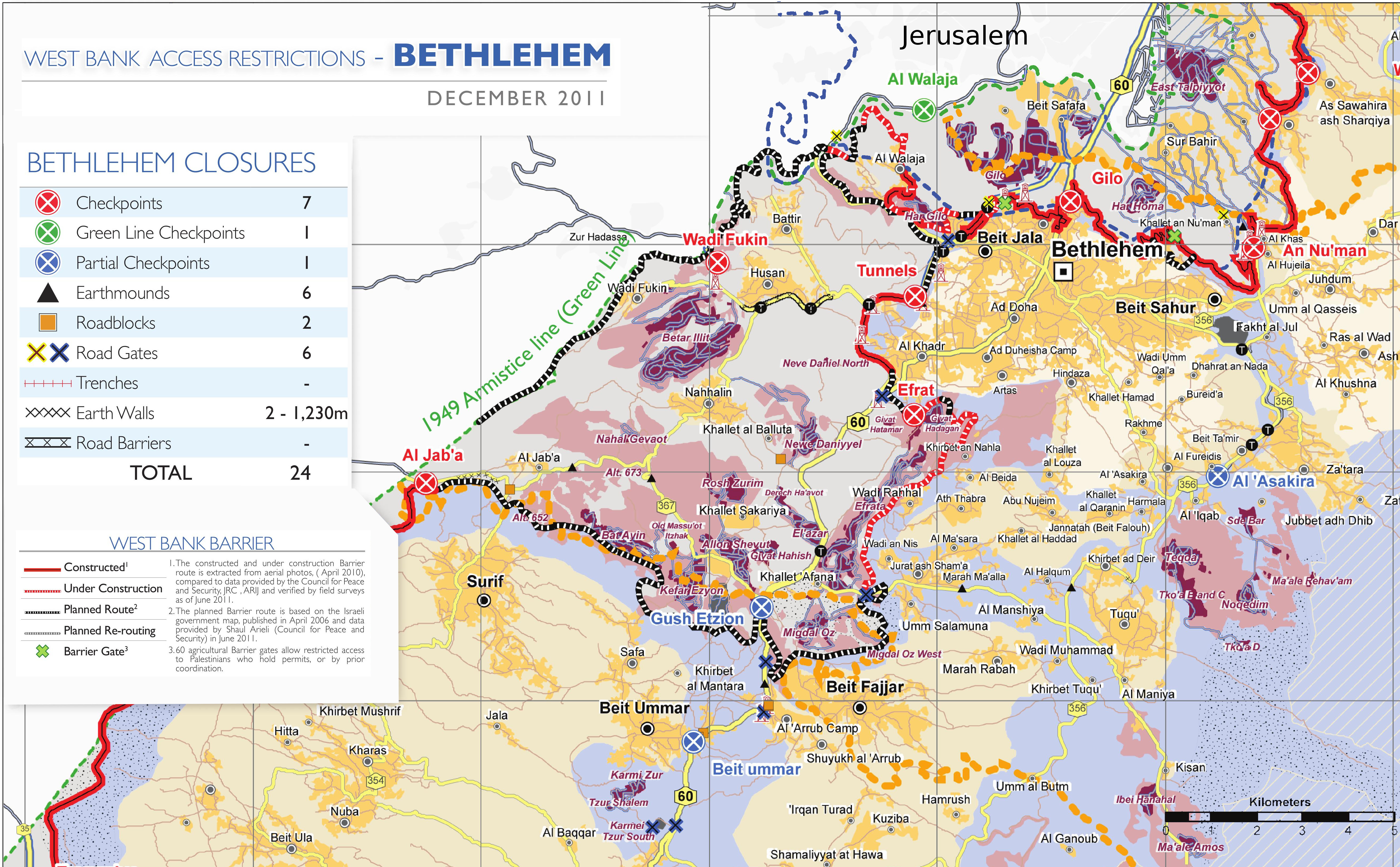
- Area map showing Khallet Sakariya, 2011

- Location of Khirbet Beit Zakariyyah within Palestine Location of Khirbet Beit Zakariyyah within the West Bank
- Coordinates: 31°39′47″N 35°07′24″E
- Palestine grid: 160/118
- State: State of Palestine
- Governorate: Bethlehem

Government
  - Type: Village council
- Elevation: 950 m (3,120 ft)

Population (2017)
  - Total: 142
- Name meaning: Khurbet Beit Skâria; The ruin of Beit Skaria (the ancient Beth Zacharias)

Khirbet Beit Zakariyyah (variants: Beit Iskâria, Khirbet Zakariah, Beit Skâria; Arabic: خربة بيت زكريا) is a small Palestinian village southwest of Bethlehem in the West Bank, perched on a hill that rises about 995 metres (3,264 ft) above sea level. Administratively, it is associated with the village of Artas under the Bethlehem Governorate. It is also located in between the Israeli settlements of Alon Shevut and Rosh Tzurim, both of which were built on land confiscated from the village. The village had a population of 142 in 2017.

== Location ==
Khirbet Beit Zakariyyah is located 9 kilometers (5.6 mi) (horizontal distance) south of Bethlehem. It is bordered by Wadi an Nis to the east, Nahhalin to the north, Al Jab’a to the west, and Beit ‘Ummar and Surif to the south.

== History ==
The village may be the site of the Battle of Beth Zechariah between the Jewish Maccabeans and Selucid Greek forces during the Maccabean revolt against the Seleucid Empire, in the year 162 BCE.

Three rock-cut burial caves, dating to the 1st century BCE have been excavated, and pottery fragments from the 1st century BCE were found. Potsherds from the Roman and Byzantine era have also been found here.

In the Byzantine period an important church was located here, which appears on the Madaba map. Since then a mosque, going by the name Nabi-Zakariah, has been built on the site of the church. Some of the ruins of the church are preserved in the courtyard and roof of the mosque. In general, some of the houses in the village are built on top of ancient ruins and caves (among which is a columbarium).

During the Crusader era, Casale Zacharie, like nearby al-Khidr, probably was a Christian village, and it was granted with al-Khidr to the church of Bethlehem between c. 1155 and c. 1186.

Pottery fragments from the Mamluk era have also been found.

=== Ottoman era ===
In the Ottoman census of 1538–1539, Bayt Dhakariyya was located in the nahiya of Halil, while in 1557, it was noted that the village revenues went to an Imperial imaret in Jerusalem.

In 1852, Edward Robinson noted Beit Sakarieh “on an almost isolated promontory or Tell, jutting out northwest between two deep valleys; and connected with the high ground south by a low neck between the heads of those two valleys."

An Ottoman list from about 1870 notes a Muslim wali, dedicated to a Sheikh Zakarja, located under a large tree. Several cisterns were also noted, and that the old Roman road to Jerusalem passed by.

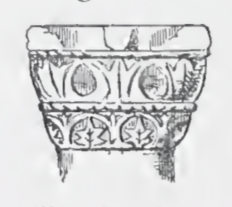
A Byzantine capital, noted in 1873

The PEF's Survey of Western Palestine visited in 1873 and noted: "From the main Roman road on the south a path leads to this ruin, situate on the brow, overlooking deep valleys on the east and north. Beside the path is a square foundation about 50 feet side, of roughly-dressed stones. The remains on the hill-brow are those of a large modern village, with more ancient foundations. One wall consists of stones 4 1/2 feet long, 2 feet high, roughly dressed. There is also a mosque, with a portico on the west, sunk below the surface. On the north side of this portico a pillar is placed with a capital of basket-work (see illustration), like the eighth century Byzantine capitals. The shaft is 2 feet diameter. The mosque door was shut; perhaps it may represent the site of the church which once stood at this place. [..] Drafted stones with a rough boss were also found, and another capital, apparently Byzantine. To the west of the site are rock-cut tombs, now blocked. A tree grows over the Mukam, or mosque."

French explorer Victor Guérin visited the village and described the ruins he saw around the village mosque:

A small mosque contains, they say, a tomb, which is no longer visible, buried as it is under rubble; it is believed to contain the venerated remains of Abu Zakaria. At the entrance of this sanctuary, I notice two columns which seem to come from a Byzantine church; the capitals, in fact, represent a sort of basket of rushes intertwined like the meshes of a net.

=== Gush Etzion settlement bloc ===
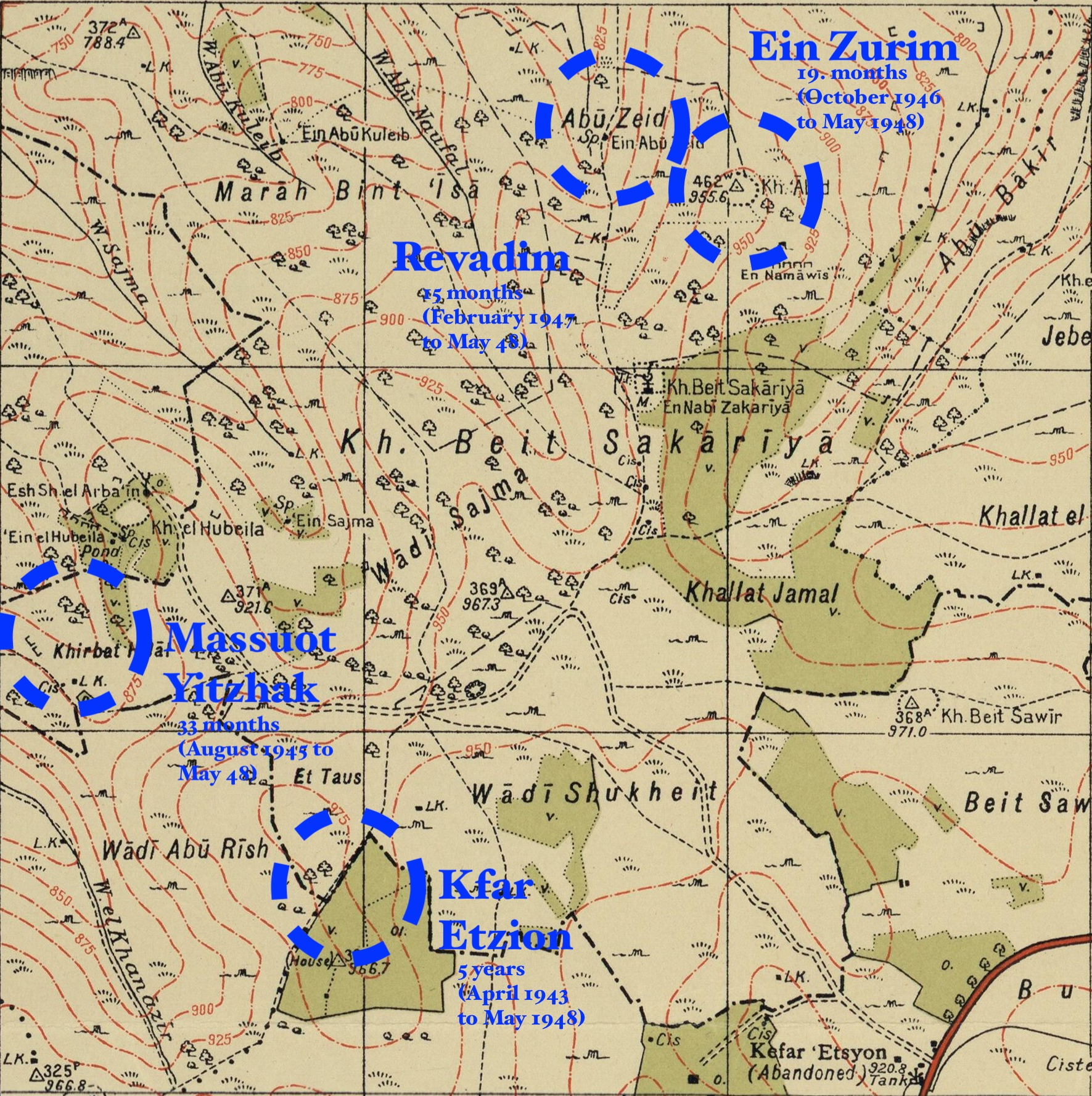
The four kibbutzes of the Gush Etzion Bloc (Kfar Etzion, Ein Zurim, Massuot Yitzhak, Revadim), constructed on land purchased from 1920 to 1930, overlaid on a 1943 Survey of Palestine map; they are shown adjoining the village boundaries of Khirbet Beit Zakariyyah

Between 1943 and 1947, four Jewish communities -- Kfar Etzion, Ein Zurim, Massuot Yitzhak and Revadim -- were built on land acquired from 1920 to 1930; the area became known as Gush Etzion (the "Etzion Bloc").

=== 1948 ===
On January 14, 1948, Arab forces led by Abd al-Qadir al-Husayni attempted to capture the strategic hill of Beit Zakariah, and thus to split Gush Etzion into two in preparation for its total conquest. However, Jewish forces defeated them in the Battle of 3 Shevat. The defeat had strategic implications for all of Palestine - as a result, Husseini cancelled his plans to attack Jewish communities, and focused on attacks on the roads.

=== Jordanian era ===
In the wake of the 1948 Arab–Israeli War, and after the 1949 Armistice Agreements, Khirbet Beit Zakariyyah came under Jordanian rule. The Jewish villages in the Etzion block were depopulated. These villages were re-established after 1967.

=== 1967-present ===
Since the Six-Day War in 1967, Khirbet Beit Zakariyyah has been under Israeli occupation.

After the Oslo Accords in 1995, 100% of Khirbet Beit Zakariyyah land was classified as Area C, under full Israeli control.

According to ARIJ, Israel has confiscated land from Khirbet Beit Zakariyyah in order to construct six Israeli settlements:

- 920 dunams for Allon Shevut
- 780 dunams for Rosh Zurim
- 420 dunams for Kfar Etzion
- 144 dunams for Bat Ayin
- 45 dunams for Efrat
- 41 dunams for Migdal Oz

== Bibliography ==
- Ben-Yosef, Sefi, ed. (n.d.). "Khirbet Zakaria (Beit Iskâria)". Israel Guide - Judaea (A useful encyclopedia for the knowledge of the country) (in Hebrew). Vol. 9. Jerusalem: Keter Publishing House. pp. 179–180. OCLC 745203905.
- Conder, C.R.; Kitchener, H.H. (1883). The Survey of Western Palestine: Memoirs of the Topography, Orography, Hydrography, and Archaeology. Vol. 3. London: Committee of the Palestine Exploration Fund.
- Guérin, V. (1869). Description Géographique Historique et Archéologique de la Palestine (in French). Vol. 1: Judee, pt. 3. Paris: L'Imprimerie Nationale.
- Palmer, E.H. (1881). The Survey of Western Palestine: Arabic and English Name Lists Collected During the Survey by Lieutenants Conder and Kitchener, R. E. Transliterated and Explained by E.H. Palmer. Committee of the Palestine Exploration Fund.
- Peleg, Yuval; Feller, Yaron (2004-05-31). "Rosh Zurim". Hadashot Arkheologiyot – Excavations and Surveys in Israel (116). Israel Antiquities Authority.
- Pringle, D. (1993). The Churches of the Crusader Kingdom of Jerusalem: A-K (excluding Acre and Jerusalem). Vol. I. Cambridge University Press. ISBN 0-521-39036-2.
- Robinson, E.; Smith, E. (1856). Later Biblical Researches in Palestine and adjacent regions: A Journal of Travels in the year 1852. London: John Murray.
- Schürer, E.; Millar, F.; Vermes, G. (2014). The History of the Jewish People in the Age of Jesus Christ. A&C Black. ISBN 978-1472558275.
- Singer, A. (1994). Palestinian Peasants and Ottoman Officials: Rural Administration Around Sixteenth-Century Jerusalem. Cambridge University Press. ISBN 9780521476799.
- Socin, A. (1879). "Alphabetisches Verzeichniss von Ortschaften des Paschalik Jerusalem". Zeitschrift des Deutschen Palästina-Vereins. 2: 135–163.
- Toledano, E. (1984). "The Sanjaq of Jerusalem in the Sixteenth Century: Aspects of Topography and Population". Archivum Ottomanicum. 9: 279–319. Archived from the original on 2016-03-05.
- van de Velde, C.W.M. (1858). Memoir to Accompany the Map of the Holy Land. Gotha: Justus Perthes. (p. 166)
