= Eleazar Avaran =

Maccabean revolutionary

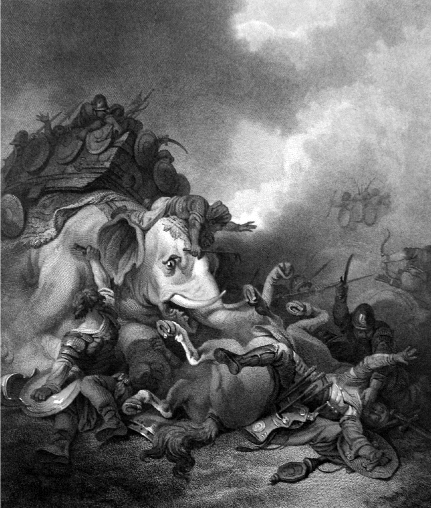
The Heroism of Eleazar, engraved plate in the Macklin Bible after a painting by Philip James de Loutherbourg, 1815.

Eleazar Avaran, also known as Eleazar Maccabeus, Eleazar Hachorani/Chorani (Hebrew: אלעזר המכבי Eleazar HaMakabi, אלעזר החורני Eleazar HaChorani; died 162 BC) was the fourth son of Mattathias and the younger brother of Judas Maccabeus. He was killed at the Battle of Beth-zechariah (1 Maccabees 6:32–33) during the Maccabean revolt.

Little is known about Eleazar, except his heroic death as was told. According to the scroll of Antiochus, his father saw in him a Zealot among zealots, like Pinhas. In 2 Maccabees 8:21–23 it is told that Eleazar read from the Tanakh in front of the people just before the last battle began in 3 Maccabees 6:1–15.

== Death and legacy ==
According to 1 Maccabees 6:43–46, during the Battle of Beit Zechariah, Eleazar identified a war elephant that he believed to carry the Seleucid King Antiochus V, due to the special armor the elephant wore. He decided to endanger his life by attacking the elephant and thrusting a spear into its belly. The dead elephant then collapsed upon Eleazar, killing him as well. Despite this heroic effort, the smaller Jewish army was defeated in the battle. Josephus wrote that Eleazar, though killing many enemy soldiers, did not gain any real effect besides the name he made for himself. In another variation of this story which appears in the Megillat Antiochus, Eleazar's body is discovered after sinking in the excrement of an elephant.

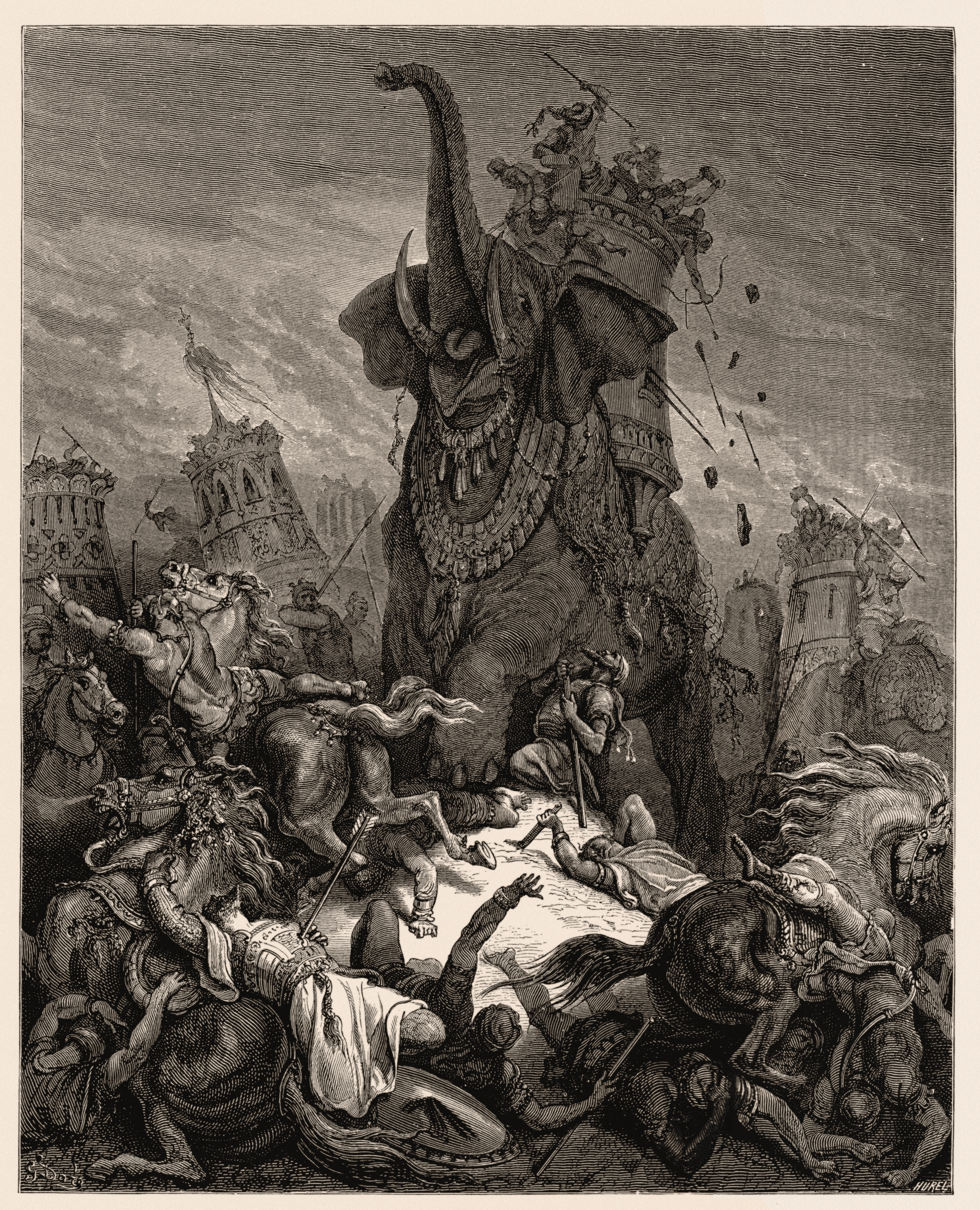
Death of Eleazer (illustration by Gustave Doré from the 1866 La Sainte Bible)

All of the members of the family of Mattathias were given nicknames in addition to their personal names as can be seen in 1 Maccabees 2:1–5 (For example, Judas was given the name 'ha'Makabi', meaning 'the Hammer'.) Eleazar was given the name 'Avaran' ("Sauran" in the Alexandrian version of the book of 1 Maccabees), which has been taken to mean 'the Piercer' (in reference to his death) or 'to be white' (referring to his light complexion). Other versions are "Horan", possibly derived from "Hor"="hole", similar to the "piercer" designation; and "Eran" (alert, vigorous).

Eleazar's death was a popular subject for art in the Middle Ages, where it was given a typological significance as prefiguring Christ's sacrifice of himself for mankind. The chance to portray an elephant was also welcomed by artists, although as most had never seen one, the results are often very strange. It is also portrayed in a painting of 19th century French artist Gustave Doré. The Israeli settlement, Elazar, in Gush Etzion, near the site of the battle of Beth-zechariah, is named after him. Streets are named after him in Jerusalem and in Tel Aviv.
