= Elazar (Israeli settlement) =

Israeli settlement in the West Bank

Elazar: אֶלְעָזָר (Hebrew); إليعازر (Arabic)

Hebrew transcription(s)
  - Standard: El'azar
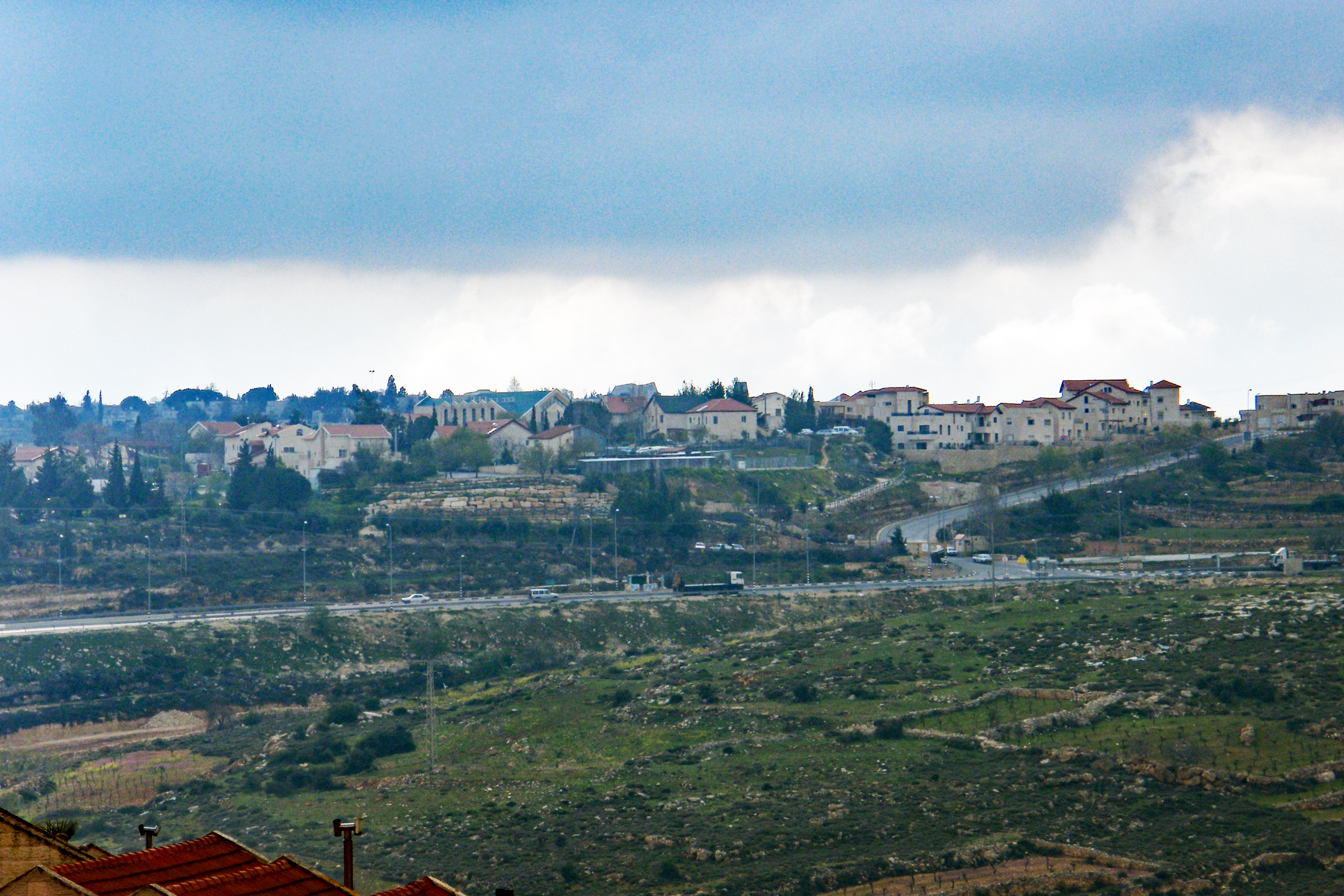
- Elazar from Efrat
- Etymology: Named for Eleazar Avaran
- Location within the Southern West Bank
- Coordinates: 31°39′36″N 35°8′31″E
- Country: Palestine
- District: Judea and Samaria Area
- Council: Gush Etzion
- Region: West Bank
- Affiliation: Hapoel HaMizrachi
- Founded: 1975
- Founder: Immigrants from North America
- Population (2024): 2,598

Elazar (Hebrew: אֶלְעָזָר) is an Israeli settlement in the West Bank, 18 kilometers south of Jerusalem in the Gush Etzion cluster of settlements. A community settlement, it had a population of 2,598 in 2024. It is administered by the Gush Etzion Regional Council. The international community considers Israeli settlements in the West Bank illegal under international law, although the Israeli government disputes this.

== Netiv HaAvot outpost ==
The Netiv HaAvot outpost, officially an expansion of Elazar, 500 meters beyond the Elzar settlement's jurisdiction, and adjacent to Alon Shvut is built on land which some human rights organizations consider privately owned Palestinian agricultural land, the former property of the Mussa family of al-Khader. Local Palestinian villagers say they owned and worked the land until military curfews and closures in the wake of the Al-Aqsa Intifada (Second Intifada) forced them to abandon it, whereupon settlers moved onto the land to build there in February 2001. An assistant to the Minister of Defence at that time, Brig. Gen. Baruch Spiegel, stated that the outpost was built on privately owned Palestinian land and on "survey land", meaning land whose ownership was still subject to determination. Netiv HaAvot subsequently figured among 105 outposts listed in the Sasson Report submitted to the Israel cabinet in 2005, and the report noted that Israeli Ministry of Housing and Construction had by that date spent NIS 300,000 to develop the outpost.

Netiv HaAvot has since been the subject of two High Court of Justice petitions. The court ordered the government to form a committee to examine the land ownership issue after 8 Palestinian farmers from al-Khader petitioned for the demolition of the outpost in 2002 on the basis that it was built on their privately owned land. No committee was constituted however. In 2008, a second petition to demolish the outpost was filed by Peace Now, and the state said a committee would be formed to examine land ownership. The office of the State Attorney responded by concurring that the outpost was unauthorized and that action, stop-work orders an demolitions, was being taken. In July 2009, justices ordered the state to provide a "clear timetable for carrying out the orders." The timetable was never produced, On being told by Israeli Labor MP Yuli Tamir, who confronted the residents, that the outpost had been built without permits, the Gush Etzion Council head Shaul Goldstein replied:"I have examined 200 locales around Israel, and they were all erected this way. This is the building culture in Israel."

The state, though having repeated for 9 years that the outpost had been built illegally, stated through the Attorney General on the 25 April 2010, in a notification to the High Court of Justice that the government was considering approving the settlement, subject to determining what buildings stood on state ground and which constructions were built on private Palestinian land. If cases were found reflecting the latter circumstance, then demolitions would proceed. B'tselem, the Israeli Human Rights organization argued that any such government approval would constitute approval of looting and unlawful construction, and implied that the state was ignoring obligations undertaking in the Road map for peace. The Peace Now petition was rejected in October 2010 by Justice Edmond Levy because the land survey had not been carried out. The survey, completed a month later, found that 60% of the outpost was built on privately owned Palestinian farmland. On April 13, 2014, Israel announced its intention to retroactively declare 983 dunams around Netiv HaAvot state land, marking the largest expropriation of West Bank territory in recent times. Palestinian village leaders were given notice of the state's intention to appropriate the land, and have 45 days to appeal the decision. According to Haaretz the "planned appropriation of land far exceeds the size of Netiv Ha'avot, which is built on just a few dozen dunams". About 50 families live in the outpost, including the secretary of Amana described by Haaretz as "the organization that is the driving force behind all the illegal outposts". Palestinians living in nearby villages were given 45 days to appeal the decision. Dror Etkes, head of the Peace Now settlement tracking project, described the decision as "a faithful reflection of the Netanyahu government's policy" intended to "extinguish the last embers of the negotiations with the Palestinians".

On June 12, 2018, the outpost was evicted due to a supreme court decision.
