= Efrat (Israeli settlement) =

Israeli settlement in the West Bank

Coordinates: 31°39′28.8″N 35°9′11.16″E

Efrat: אֶפְרָת, אֶפְרָתָה; أفرات
- Local council

Hebrew transcription(s)
  - ISO 259: ʔeprat, ʔepráta
  - Also spelled: Efrata (previously) (official)
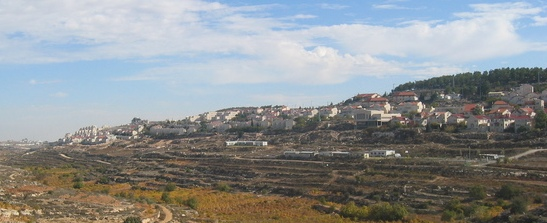
- Efrat, 2012
- Interactive map of Efrat
- Location within the Southern West Bank
- Region: West Bank
- District: Judea and Samaria Area
- Founded: 1983

Government
  - Head of Municipality: Dovi Shefler

Area
  - Total: 6,280 dunams (6.28 km^{2}; 2.42 sq mi)

Population (2024)
  - Total: 12,114
  - Density: 1,930/km^{2} (5,000/sq mi)

Efrat (Hebrew: אֶפְרָת), or previously officially Efrata (Hebrew: אֶפְרָתָה), is an Israeli settlement in the West Bank, established in 1983 in the Judean Mountains. Efrat is located 12 kilometers (7.5 mi) south of Jerusalem, between Bethlehem and Hebron, 6.5 km (4 mi) east of the Green Line, at the Palestinian side of the West Bank wall. The settlement stands at an altitude of up to 960 metres (3,150 feet) above sea level and covers about 6,000 dunam (1,500 acres). The international community considers Israeli settlements in the West Bank illegal under international law, but the Israeli government disputes this.

Considered the capital of Gush Etzion, it had a population of 12,114 in 2024. Although geographically located within Gush Etzion, it is independent from the Gush Etzion Regional Council, and Palestinians in negotiations do not consider it as part of that block, since it lies to the east of Route 60 — their side of the Geneva Initiative map. From November 2008 to March 2024, Oded Revivi, an attorney and lieutenant colonel in the army and member of the Likud Central Committee, was the head of Efrat regional council. He was beaten in a closely contested municipal election by longtime council member Dovi Shefler, who took office as Mayor of Efrat on April 1, 2024.

== Etymology ==
Efrat is named after the biblical place Ephrath. While according to the Israeli Ministry of the Interior, "Efrata" is the quotation from the Biblical verse, and therefore the town's name, Efrata's residents and municipality have maintained for many years that the reference isn't the location's name, but rather means "towards Efrat". This has recently changed, with the residents and municipality convincing the Ministry of the Interior of the correct name. The '-a' ending is common in Hebrew and may indicate female grammatical gender or mean 'her' or less frequent 'towards'. On the other hand, there are very clear biblical references to "Ephratah", in a context it cannot possibly mean "towards Ephrat", e.g. Ruth 4:11, 1 Chronicles 2:50, 1 Chronicles 4:4, Psalms 132:6, Micah 5:1. Therefore, there were until recently two names in use: Internal and private references speak of "Efrat", whereas all inter-city roadsigns, under purview of the national government, read "Efrata" (and still do, not having been updated in light of the recent change).

== Status under international law ==
Like all Israeli settlements in the Israeli-occupied territories, Efrat is considered illegal under international law, though Israel disputes this. Most of the international community considers Israeli settlements to violate the Fourth Geneva Convention's prohibition on the transfer of an occupying power's civilian population into occupied territory. Israel disputes that the Fourth Geneva Convention applies to the Palestinian territories as they had not been legally held by a sovereign prior to Israel taking control of them. This view has been rejected by the International Court of Justice and the International Committee of the Red Cross.

== History ==
=== Bronze Age ===
The area in which Efrat was constructed was the site of an Ancient Israelite settlement during the Bronze Age. Archaeological excavations revealed an ancient Jewish cemetery consisting of a tumulus built over a platform structure and more than twenty Bronze Age burial caves of the shaft tomb type, many of which had been reused over long stretches of time.

=== Classical antiquity ===
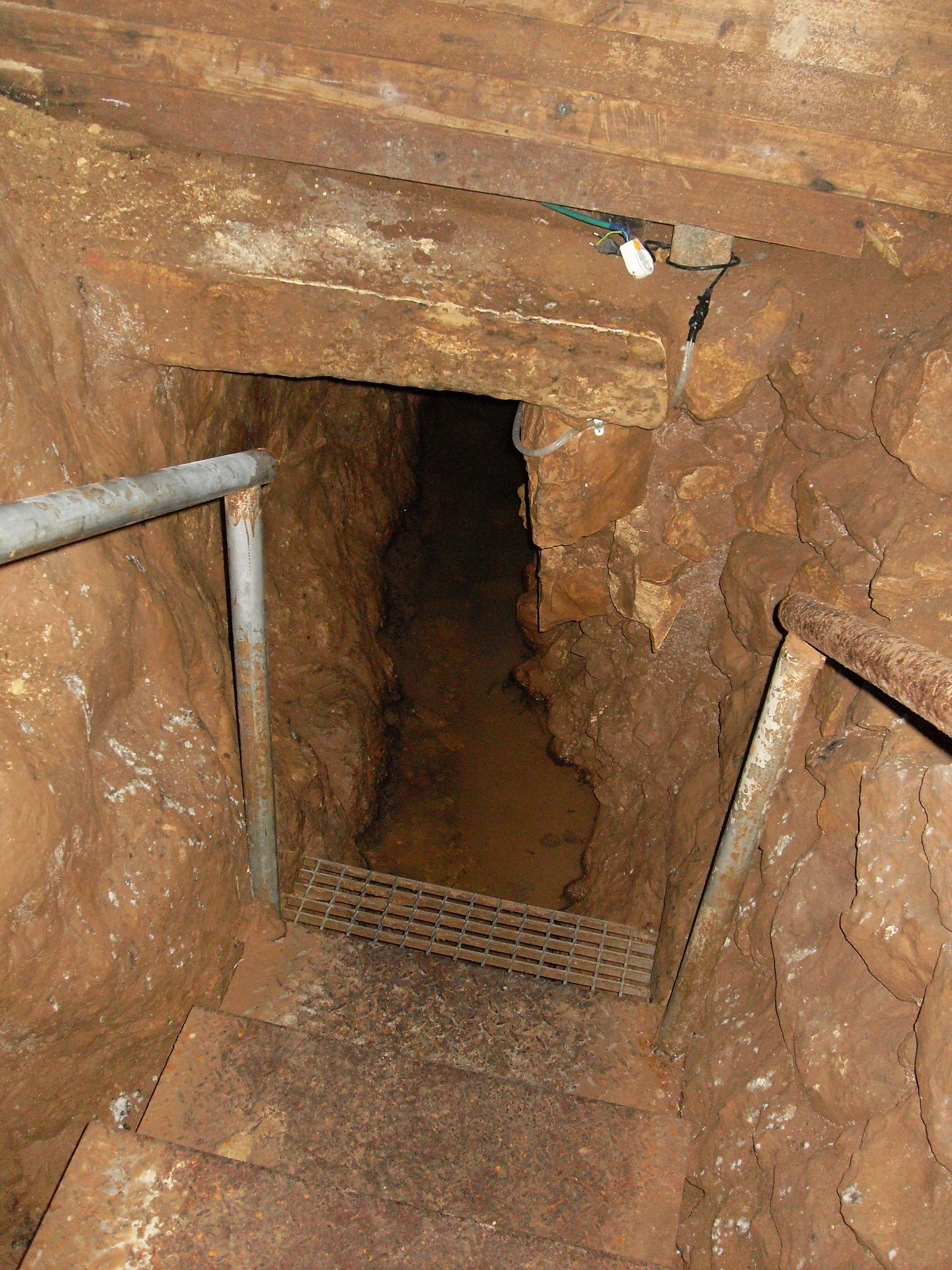
Ancient Judaean Aqueduct near Efrat

One of the three ancient Judaean aqueducts built by King Herod during the Herodian dynasty of Judea to supply the capital city of Judea, Jerusalem, with enough water to meet the needs of its population of 600,000, mostly Jews along with smaller numbers of Samaritans and Roman soldiers. The aqueduct is known as (Hebrew: אָמָת הבִּיאָר), in Hebrew.

=== Modern Efrat ===
Modern Efrat was established in 1983 by Moshe Moskovits, who became the first mayor of Efrat and Shlomo Riskin, an Orthodox rabbi from New York City who settled in Efrat and became its Chief rabbi. In January 2010, he made headlines, when he declared cigarettes as "treif" and together with Efrat's other chief rabbi Shimon Golan issued a prohibition against sale of cigarettes on halachic basis.

Although traditionally considered one of the more politically moderate settlements, in the Knesset elections of November 2022 almost half the residents voted for the far-right Religious Zionist Party.

=== Palestinian land claims ===
According to ARIJ, Israel confiscated land from four nearby Palestinian villages in order to construct Efrat:

- 2,180 dunams from al-Khader,
- 1,713 dunams from Wadi an Nis,
- 421 dunams from Artas,
- 45 dunams from Khirbet Beit Zakariyyah.

=== Land confiscations ===
In early 2009, the Israeli Civil Administration declared some 1,700 dunams (170 hectares or 420 acres) of land called “Givat Eitam” (Eitam Hill) by the settlers and “Khallet An-Nahla” by the Palestinians, previously considered part of Bethlehem and the village of Artas to be "state land", after a military appeals committee approved an August 2004 decision which rejected objections against the confiscation of the land filed by Palestinian landowners. A farm is to be established on the land as a placeholder until a plan to build 2,500 homes on the site can be carried out, which would double the size of the settlement. The land in question is inside the official municipal boundaries of Efrat set in 1999, but outside the separation barrier. Originally, “Givat Eitam” was included on the western side of the barrier, but as the result of deliberations in the High Court of Justice the route had to be changed and excludes “Givat Eitam”. According to Haaretz, “it can be expected that the establishment of the farm will be followed by the building of an access road and the deployment of IDF soldiers and other security arrangements, to guarantee the area's future role as part of Efrat”.

=== Ongoing expansion ===
In December 2011, it was reported that the IDF has also agreed to the expansion of Efrat and the Gush Etzion bloc with 40 single-family homes toward the north and north-east on “Givat Hadagan”, replacing the unauthorized trailer park of the campus of Yeshivat Siach Yitzhak on the site. “Givat Hadagan”, originally planned as a neighborhood of 500 homes in the 1990s, is located a few hundred meters from the Dheisheh refugee camp and from the Palestinian town of al-Khader, south of Bethlehem. Ten of the 40 planned houses are to be sold as finished houses comprising up to 160 square meters each, and the buyers of the remaining 30 lots will arrange for the construction of their homes themselves. After they are completed, the Jewish settlements in northern Gush Etzion will reach the edges of Bethlehem's southernmost suburbs. Earlier, the construction of 277 homes on a third hill in Efrat, called “Givat Hazayit”, had been approved as a reaction to the UNESCO's accepting Palestine as a full member.

After Palestinian gunmen killed one Israeli and injured five Israelis near Ma'ale Adumim, Israel's far-right Finance Minister Bezalel Smotrich in February 2024 announced a "settlement response" after speaking to Prime Minister Benjamin Netanyahu and Defense Minister Yoav Gallant, as "any harm to us will lead to more construction and more development and more of our hold all over the country", with 700 more homes in Efrat slated to be built. American Secretary of State Antony Blinken criticized the announcement, stating that new Israeli settlements are "inconsistent with international law" and "counter-productive to reaching an enduring peace", risking "Israel’s security". Israel's government in March 2024 fully approved 694 more settler homes for Efrat, reported Haaretz.

In February 2025, the Israeli government issued a tender for the construction of 974 houses in the Efrat settlement, expanding the settlement's population by around 40%, and blocking the development of Bethlehem. Israeli activist group Ir Amim cites U.S. President Donald Trump's public support for "ushering in a wave of settlement expansion".

In April 2026, Declassified UK reported that Shivat Zion, an Israeli organisation ostensibly promoting emigration to Israel, was offering assistance to British Jews considering moving to Efrat. The report also stated that an organisation representative had discussed the possibility of donations benefiting from UK tax subsidies.

== Demographics ==
Efrat's population are mainly religious Zionist, with a small number of ultra-orthodox and of non-observant residents. There are more than twenty Orthodox synagogues, mainly Ashkenazi, but a Sephardi and a Yemenite synagogue also exist, and there are several Yeshivot and Kollelim. The population includes native-born Israelis, and immigrants who have made aliyah from the United States, United Kingdom, Australia, France, South Africa, Argentina, The Netherlands, Canada, and Russia.

With a population of around 9,200 residents, Efrat is the largest settlement in the Gush Etzion settlement bloc, one of the settlement blocs that all Israeli governments have said they want to retain under any final-status agreement with the Palestinians.

== Neighborhoods ==
Efrat is made up of seven neighborhoods named for the Seven Species: Rimon (pomegranate), Te'ena (fig), Gefen (grapevine), Dekel (date palm), Zayit (olive), Tamar (date), and Dagan (grain – symbolizing both wheat and barley).

== Voting Patterns ==
In the 2026 election, 66 percent of voters in Efrat voted for the parties of the right-wing coalition led by Benjamin Netanyahu, while 18 percent voted for the parties of the center-left coalition led by Gadi Eisenkot and 0.1 percent voted for the Arab parties. An additional 4 percent voted for the Reservists, and 9.1 percent voted for Amcha Yisrael. Voter turnout increased 9 percent from the 2022 election.
