= Rachel's Tomb =

Holy site in Bethlehem

Tomb of Rachel
- Kever Rachel (Hebrew); Qabr Raheel (Arabic)
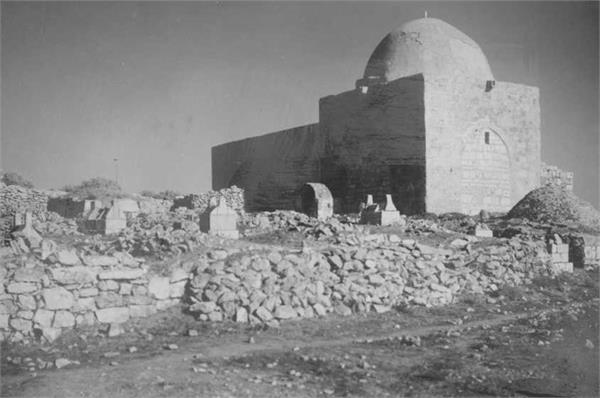
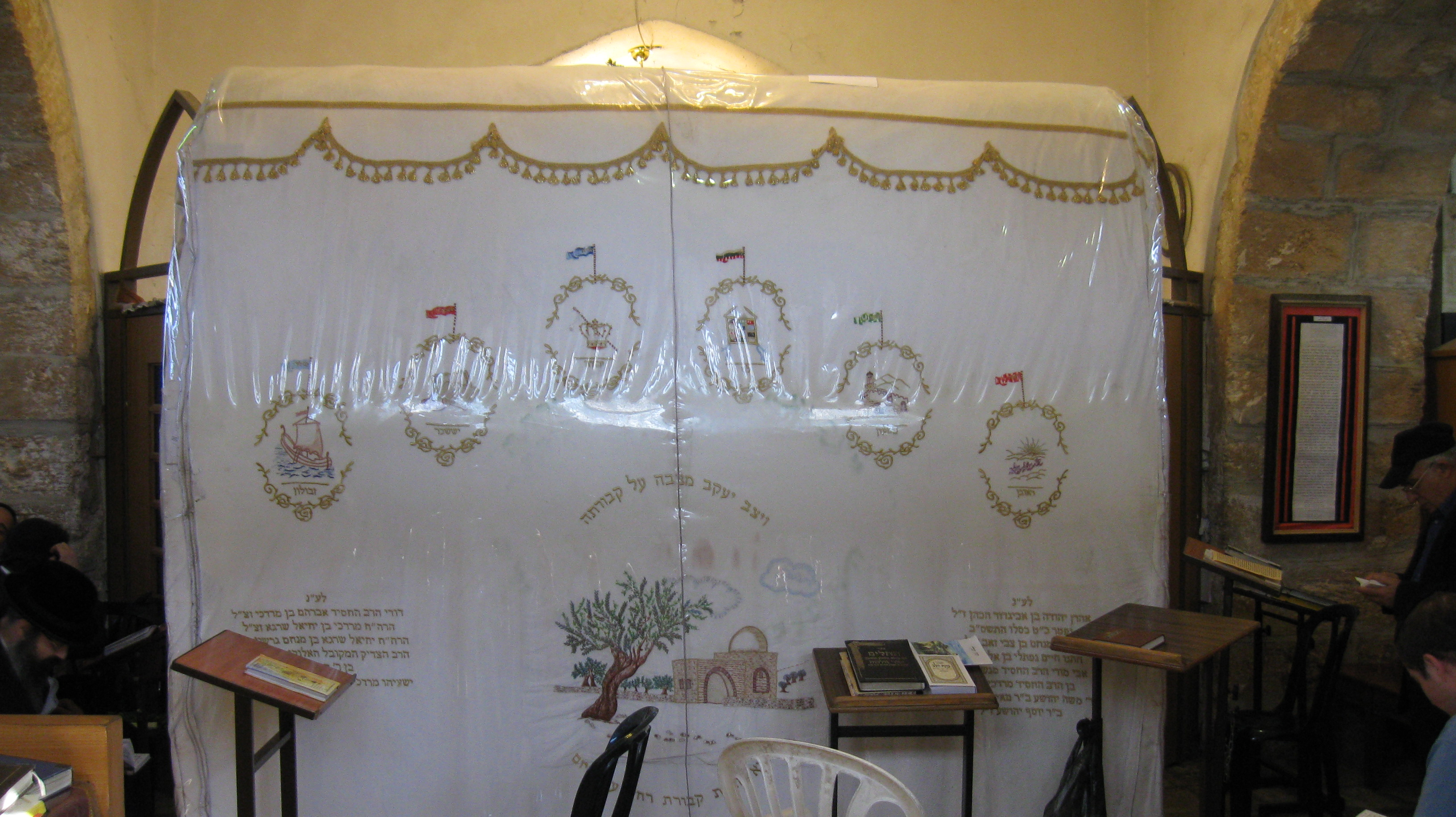
- Top: Rachel's Tomb and adjacent Islamic cemetery in the early 20th century, prior to the building of the modern Israeli fortification structure Bottom: Sarcophagus with a parochet covering

- Location within the West Bank
- 31.7193434°N 35.202116°E
- Type: tomb, prayer area
- Cultures: Jews, Muslims, Christians
- Location: near Bethlehem
- Region: West Bank
- Palestine grid: 1691/1251

History
- Built: Ottoman

Site notes
- Management: Israeli Ministry of Religious Affairs
- Public access: Limited
- Website: keverrachel.com
- Venerated as the fourth holiest site in Judaism

Rachel's Tomb (Biblical Hebrew: קְבֻרַת רָחֵל Qǝbūrat Rāḥēl; Modern Hebrew: קבר רחל Qever Raḥel; Arabic: قبر راحيل Qabr Rāḥīl) is a site revered as the burial place of the Biblical matriarch Rachel. The site is also referred to as the Bilal bin Rabah mosque (Arabic: مسجد بلال بن رباح, romanized: Masjid Bilāl ibn Rabāḥ). The tomb is held in esteem by Jews, Christians, and Muslims. The tomb, located at the northern entrance to the West Bank city of Bethlehem, next to the Rachel's Tomb checkpoint, is built in the style of a traditional maqam, Arabic for shrine.

The burial place of the matriarch Rachel had a matzevah erected at the site according to Genesis 35:20; the site was also mentioned in Muslim literature. Although the site is considered by some scholars as unlikely to be the actual site of the grave – several other sites to the north have been proposed – it is by far the most recognized candidate. The earliest extra-biblical records describing this tomb as Rachel's burial place date to the first decades of the 4th century CE. The structure in its current form dates from the Ottoman period, and is situated in a Christian and Muslim cemetery dating from at least the Mamluk period.

The first historically recorded pilgrimages to the site were by early Christians. Throughout history, the site was rarely considered a shrine exclusive to one religion and is described as being "held in esteem equally by Jews, Muslims, and Christians". Rachel's Tomb has been a site of Jewish pilgrimage since at least the eleventh century—possibly since ancient times—and remains a holy pilgrimage site for modern Jews. Meron Benvenisti described it as "one of the cornerstones of Jewish-Israeli identity".

British Jewish financier Sir Moses Montefiore significantly expanded the building in 1841, obtaining the keys for the Jewish community while building an antechamber, including a mihrab for Muslim prayer. Following a 1929 British memorandum, in 1949 the UN ruled that the Status Quo—an arrangement approved by the 1878 Treaty of Berlin concerning rights, privileges and practices in certain Holy Places—applies to the site. According to the 1947 United Nations Partition Plan for Palestine, the tomb was to be part of the internationally administered zone of Jerusalem, but the area was ruled by Jordan, which prohibited Jews from entering the area. Following the Israeli occupation of the West Bank in 1967, the site's position was formalized in 1995 under the Oslo II Accord in a Palestinian enclave (Area A), with a special arrangement making it subject to the security responsibility of Israel. In 2005, following Israeli approval on 11 September 2002, the Israeli West Bank barrier was built around the tomb, effectively annexing it to Jerusalem; Checkpoint 300 – also known as Rachel's Tomb Checkpoint – was built adjacent to the site. A 2005 report from OHCHR Special Rapporteur John Dugard noted that: "Although Rachel's Tomb is a site holy to Jews, Muslims and Christians, it has effectively been closed to Muslims and Christians." On October 21, 2015, UNESCO adopted a resolution reaffirming a 2010 statement that Rachel's Tomb was "an integral part of Palestine." On 22 October 2015, the tomb was separated from Bethlehem with a series of concrete barriers.

== Biblical accounts and disputed location ==
=== Northern vis-à-vis southern version ===
Biblical scholarship identifies two different traditions in the Hebrew Bible concerning the site of Rachel's burial, respectively a northern version, locating it north of Jerusalem near Ramah, modern Al-Ram, and a southern narrative locating it close to Bethlehem. In rabbinical tradition the duality is resolved by using two different terms in Hebrew to designate these different localities. In the Hebrew version given in Genesis, Rachel and Jacob journey from Shechem to Hebron, a short distance from Ephrath, which is glossed as Bethlehem (35:16–21, 48:7). She dies on the way giving birth to Benjamin:

"And Rachel died, and was buried on the way to Ephrath, which is Bethlehem. And Jacob set a pillar upon her grave: that is the pillar of Rachel's grave unto this day." — Genesis 35:19–20

Tom Selwyn notes that R. A. S. Macalister, the most authoritative voice on the topography of Rachel's tomb, advanced the view in 1912 that the identification with Bethlehem was based on a copyist's mistake. The Judean scribal gloss "(Ephrath, ) which is Bethlehem" was added to distinguish it from a similar toponym Ephrathah in the Bethlehem region. Some consider as certain, however, that Rachel's tomb lay to the north, in Benjamite, not in Judean territory, and that the Bethlehem gloss represents a Judean appropriation of the grave, originally in the north, to enhance Judah's prestige. At 1 Samuel 10:2, Rachel's tomb is located in the 'territory of Benjamin at Zelzah.' In the monarchic period down to the Babylonian captivity, it would follow, Rachel's tomb was thought to lie in Ramah. The indications for this are based on 1 Sam 10:2 and Jer. 31:15, which give an alternative location north of Jerusalem, in the vicinity of ar-Ram, biblical Ramah, five miles south of Bethel. One conjecture is that before David's conquest of Jerusalem, the ridge road from Bethel might have been called "the Ephrath road" (derek ’eprātāh. Genesis 35:19; derek’eprāt, Genesis 48:7), hence the passage in Genesis meant 'the road to Ephrath or Bethlehem,' on which Ramah, if that word refers to a toponym, lay. A possible location in Ramah could be the five stone monuments north of Hizma. Known as Qubur Bene Isra'in, the largest so-called tomb of the group, the function of which is obscure, has the name Qabr Umm beni Isra'in, that is, "tomb of the mother of the descendants of Israel".

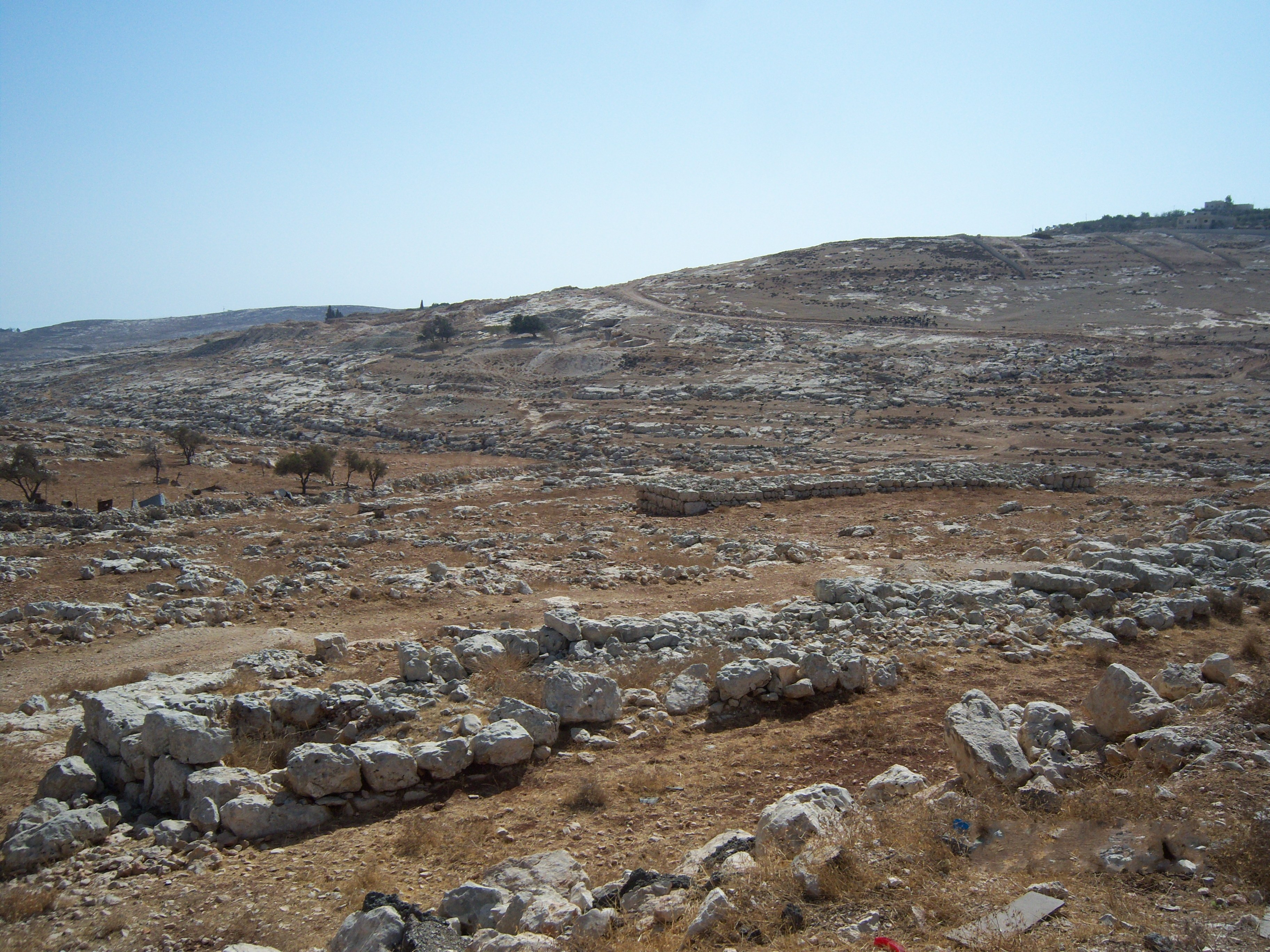
Qubur Bani Yisra'il, another possible location for Rachel's Tomb

=== Bethlehem structure ===
As to the structure outside Bethlehem being placed exactly over an ancient tomb, it was revealed during excavations in around 1825 that it was not built over a cavern; however, a deep cavern was discovered a small distance from the site.

== History ==
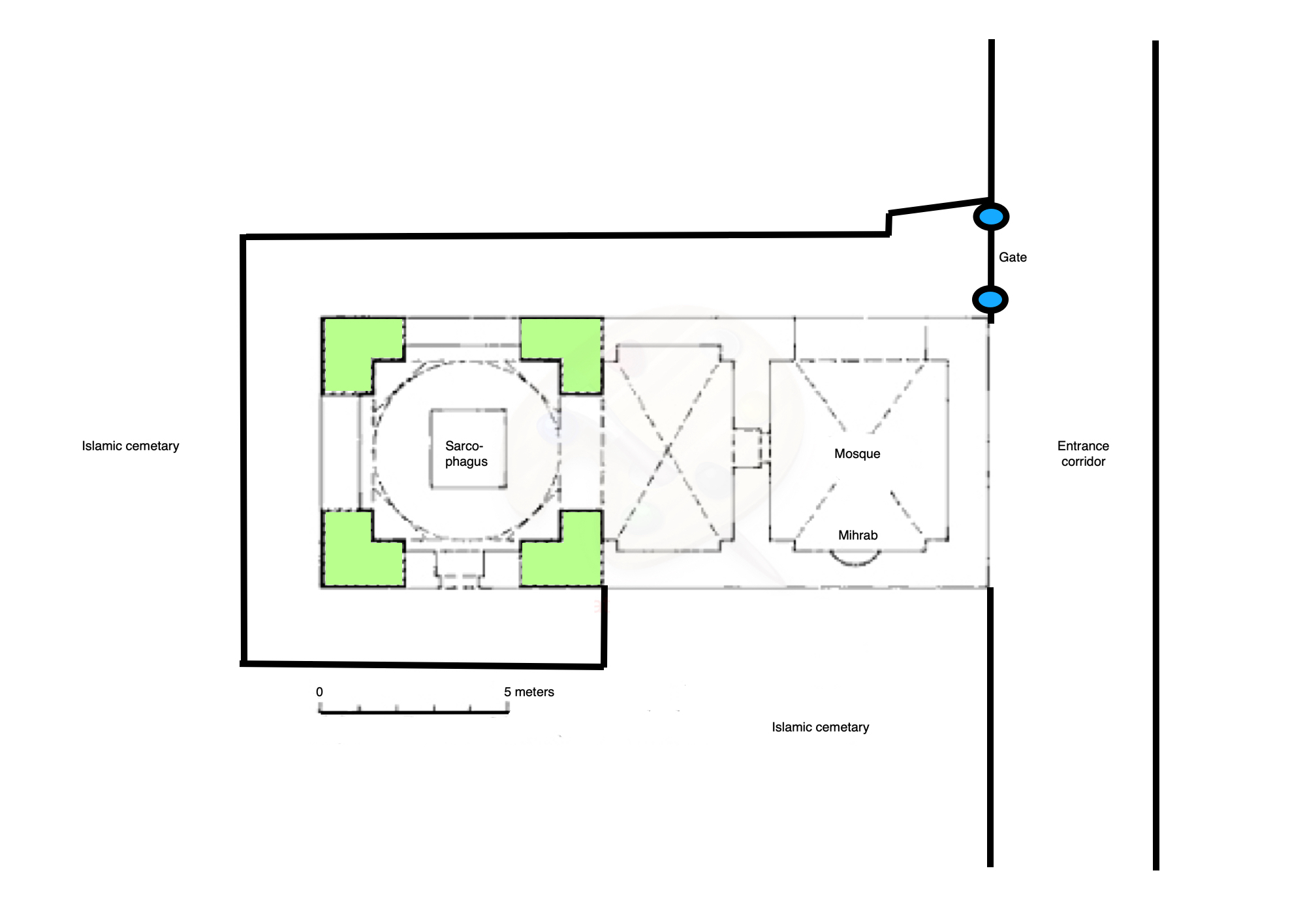
Modern layout of Rachel's Tomb, showing the historical layers of the building

=== Byzantine period ===
Traditions regarding the tomb at this location date back to the beginning of the 4th century AD. Eusebius' Onomasticon (written before 324), the Bordeaux Pilgrim (333–334), and Jerome (404) mention the tomb as being located 4 miles from Jerusalem.

The anonymous pilgrim of Piacenza (c. 575) also mentions the tomb, writing that a church had recently been erected on the site.

=== Early Muslim period ===
In the late 7th century Arculf reported a tomb "of crude workmanship, without any adornment, surrounded by a stone coping" marked with the name "Rachel." Bede similarly describes "an unopened tomb marked with the name Rachel".

During the 10th century, Muqaddasi and other geographers fail to mention the tomb, which indicates that it may have lost importance until the Crusaders revived its veneration.

=== Crusader period ===
Muhammad al-Idrisi (1154) writes, "Half-way down the road [between Bethlehem and Jerusalem] is the tomb of Rachel (Rahil), the mother of Joseph and of Benjamin, the two sons of Jacob peace upon them all! The tomb is covered by twelve stones, and above it is a dome vaulted." Pseudo-Beda (12th century) similarly writes "Over her tomb Jacob piled up twelve great stones for a memorial of his twelve sons. Her tomb, together with these stones, remains to this day."

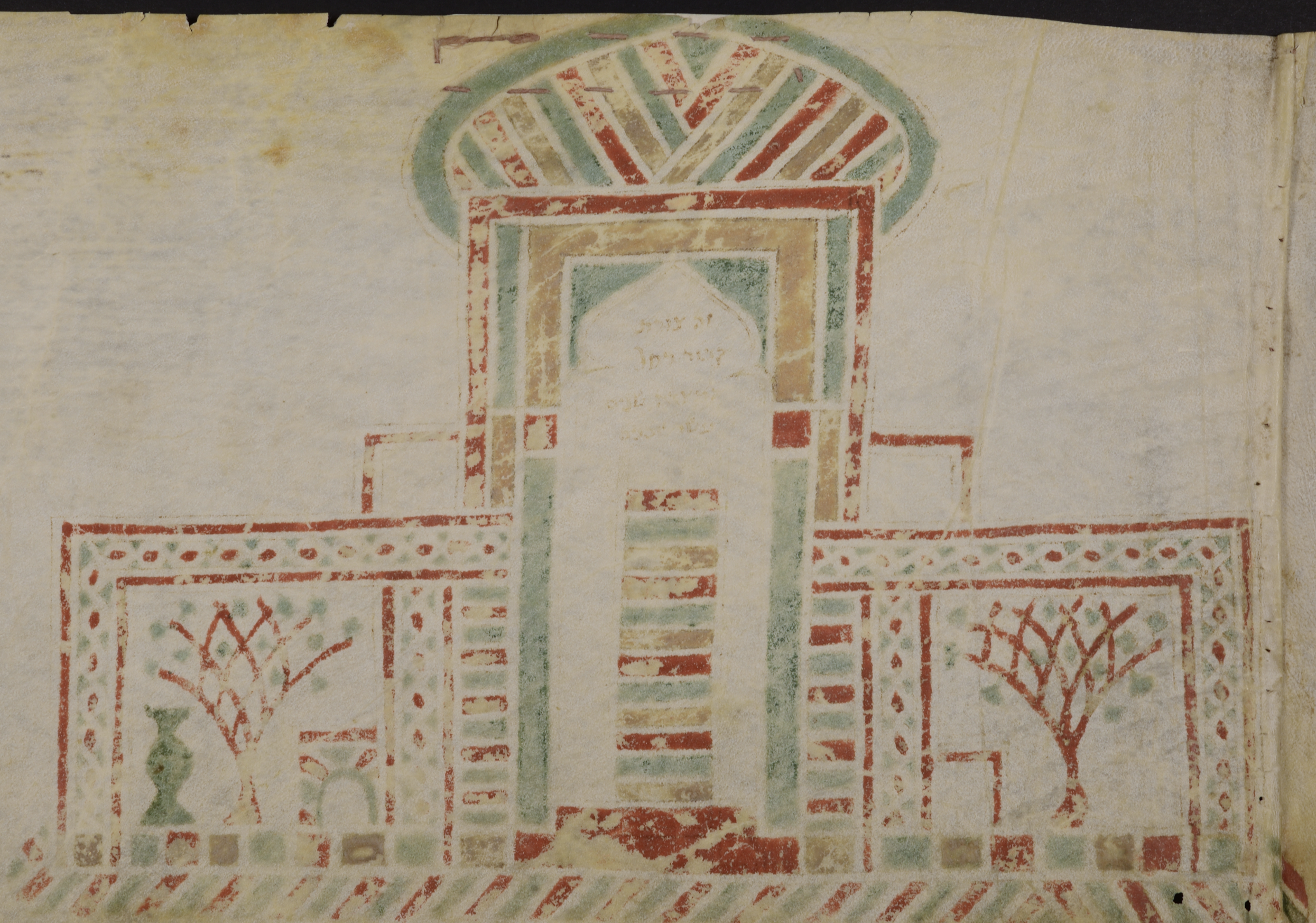
Rachel's Tomb in the "Florence Scroll" with twelve stones, c. 1315

Benjamin of Tudela (1169–71) and Jacob ben Netanel haKohen (c. 1170) were the first Jewish pilgrims to describe visits to the tomb. Benjamin mentioned a monument made of 11 stones and a cupola resting on four columns "and all the Jews that pass by carve their names upon the stones of the monument." Benjamin and Jacob explain that the 11 stones represent the tribes of Israel, excluding the baby Benjamin, while Petachiah of Regensburg (c. 1180) and the "student of Nachmanides" (14th century) argue that Joseph did not contribute a stone either, with the 11th stone representing Jacob: "The monument is of 12 (!) stones. Each stone is as wide as the grave and half as long, so that five layers of two stones each make ten. A final stone rests on top, which is as wide and as long as the grave." Already in the 11th century Tobiah ben Eliezer had written, "Each son contributed one of the 11 stones." Petachiah says the stones were "marble" (others describe them as "hewn") and that "Jacob's stone is very large, the burden of many men. The local priests tried several times to take it for use in a church, but each time they awoke to find it had returned to its place. It is engraved with 'Jacob'".

=== Mamluk period ===
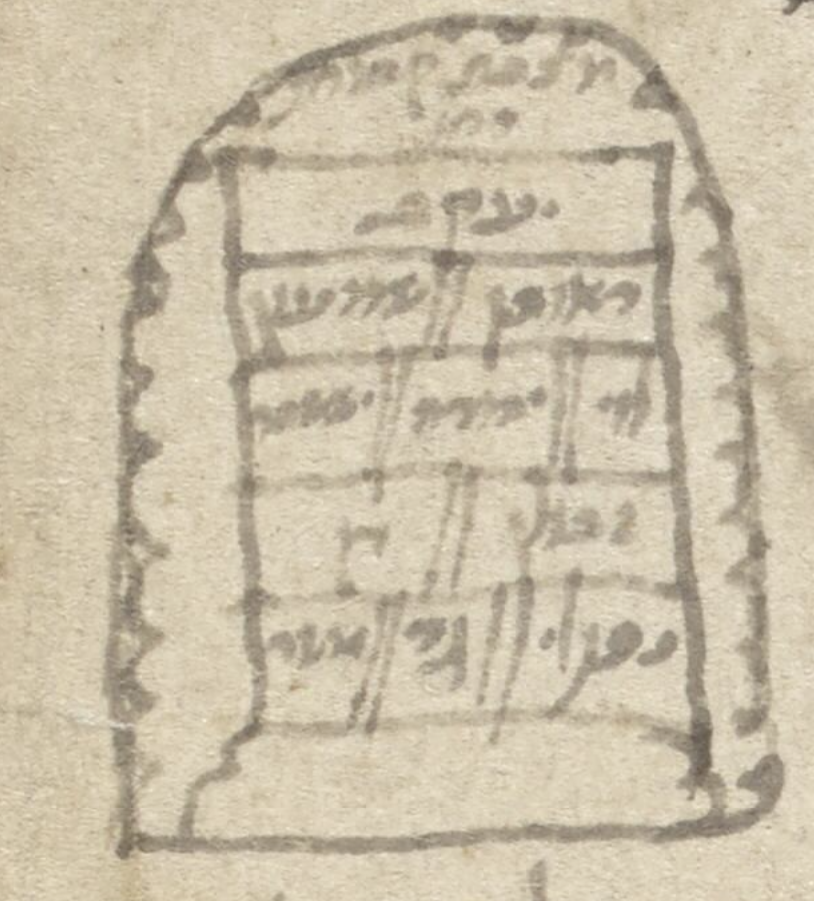
Diagram (before 1341) showing the arrangement of stones

In 1327, Antony of Cremona referred to the cenotaph as "the most wonderful tomb that I shall ever see. I do not think that with 20 pairs of oxen it would be possible to extract or move one of its stones." A Jewish pilgrimage guide (before 1341) describes a large dome, open on all four sides, with ten stones "ten fingers long" topped by one "sixteen fingers long" (diagram left). Nicolas of Poggibonsi (1346–50) describes the grave, including the "twelve stones", as 7 feet high and enclosed by a rounded tomb with three gates.

In the 15th century, if not earlier, the tomb was "appropriated by the Muslims" and rebuilt.

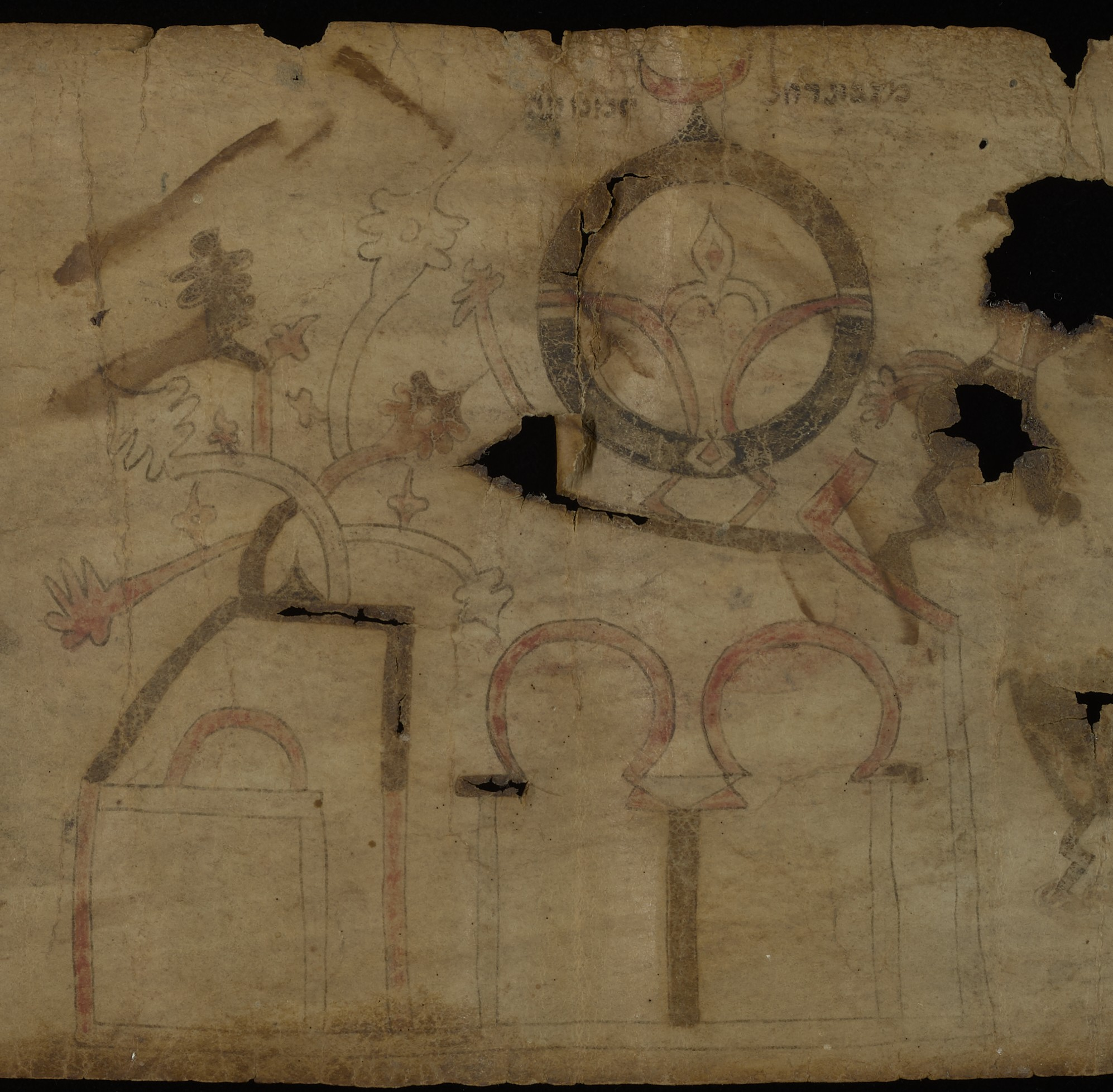
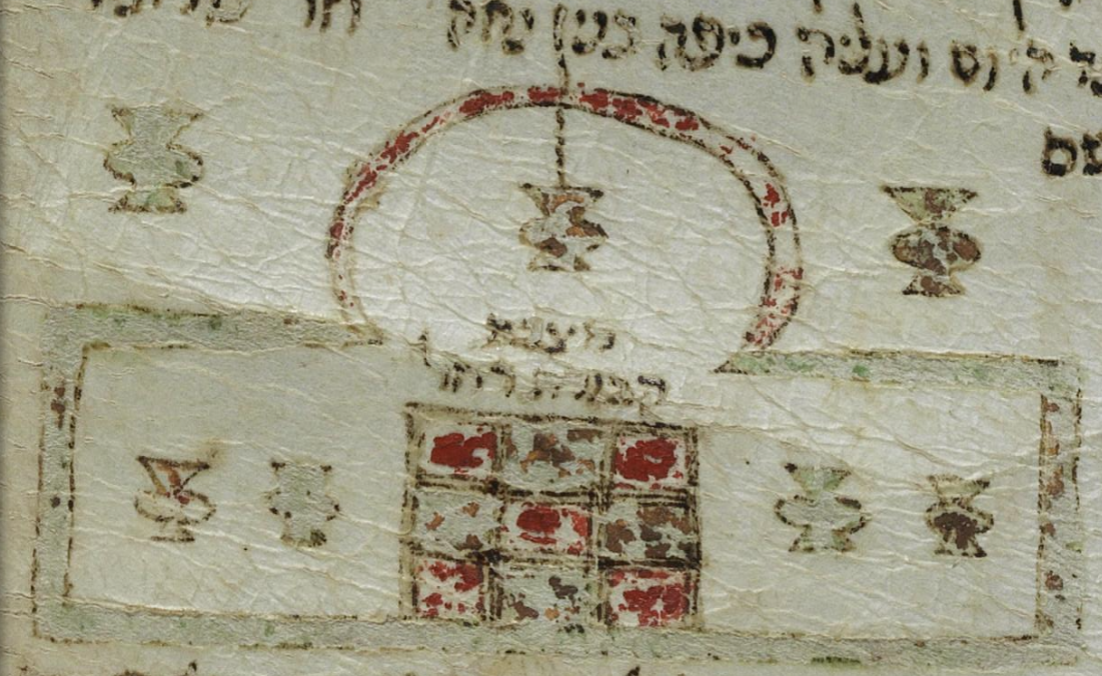
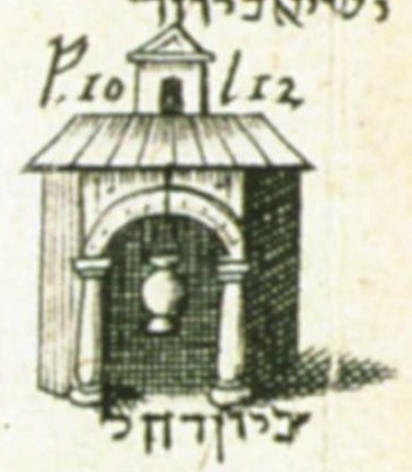
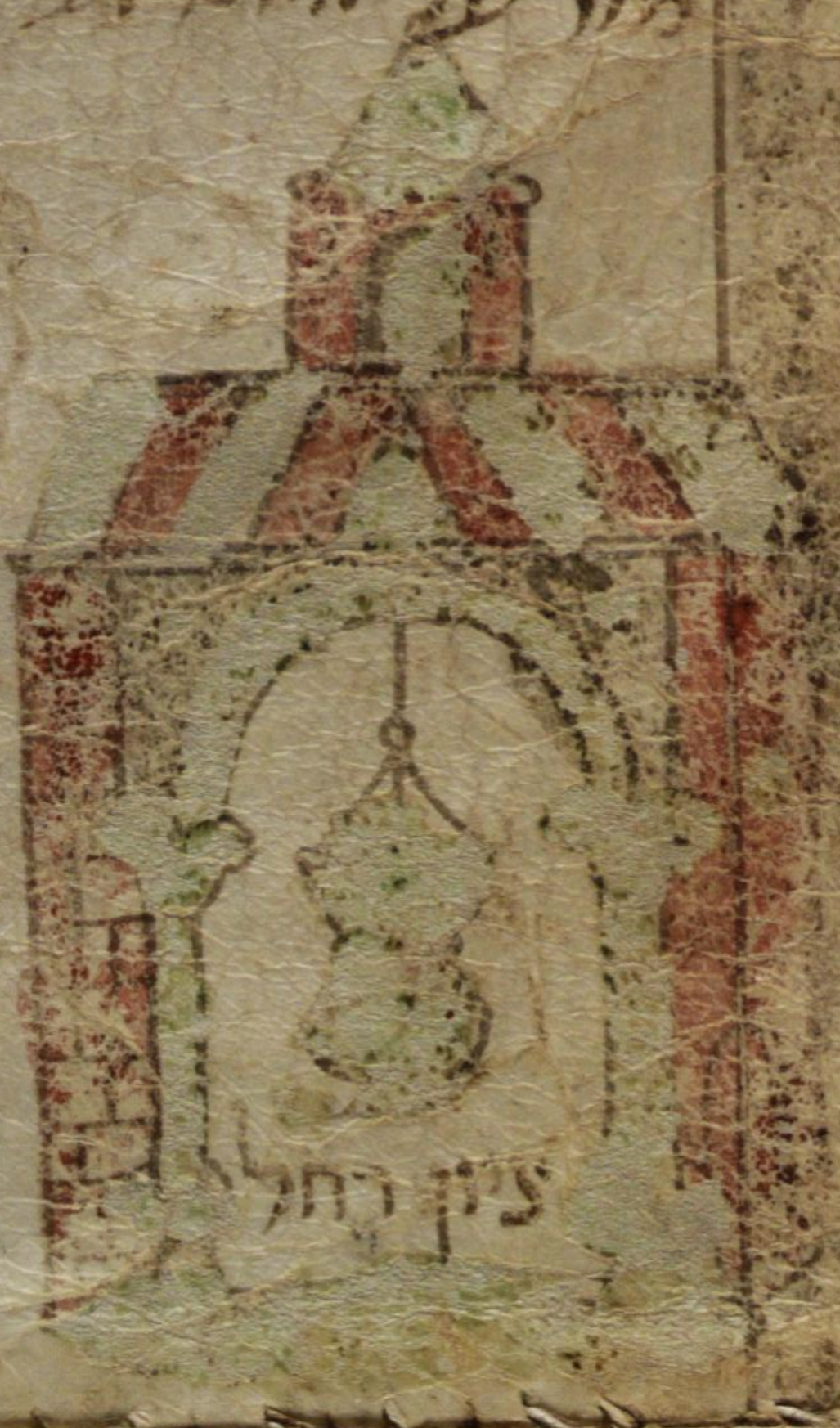
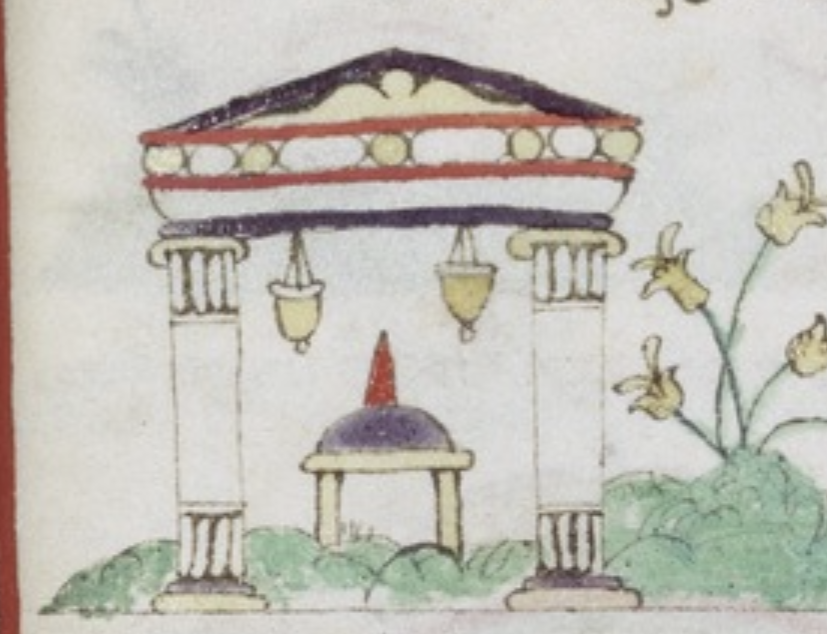
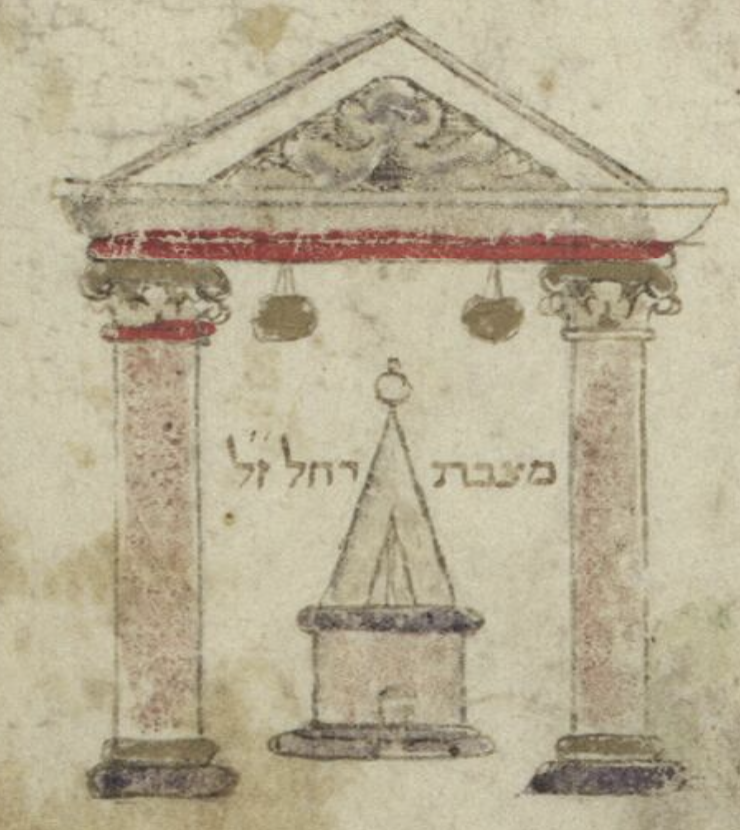
Depictions in copies of the 16th-century Jewish pilgrimage guide Yichus Avot

The Russian deacon Zosimus describes a "Saracen mosque" in 1421, and John Poloner describes a "Saracen building" in 1422. A guide published in 1467 credits Shahin al-Dhahiri (1410-1470) with the building of a cupola, cistern and drinking fountain at the site. The Muslim rebuilding of the "dome on four columns" was also mentioned by Francesco Suriano in 1485. Felix Fabri (1480–83) described it as being "a lofty pyramid, built of square and polished white stone"; He also noted a drinking water trough at its side and reported that "this place is venerated alike by Muslims, Jews, and Christians". Bernhard von Breidenbach of Mainz (1483) described women praying at the tomb and collecting stones to take home, believing that they would ease their labour. Pietro Casola (1494) described it as being "beautiful and much honoured by the Moors". Obadiah of Bertinoro (1488) writes that "There is a round dome built upon it but it does not look old to me." Mujir al-Din al-'Ulaymi (1495), the Jerusalemite qadi and Arab historian, writes under the heading of Qoubbeh Râhîl ("Dome of Rachel") that Rachel's tomb lies under this dome on the road between Bethlehem and Bayt Jala and that the edifice is turned towards the Sakhrah (the rock inside the Dome of the Rock) and widely visited by pilgrims.

Noe Bianco (1527) describes "three beautiful domes, each with four columns".

=== Ottoman period ===
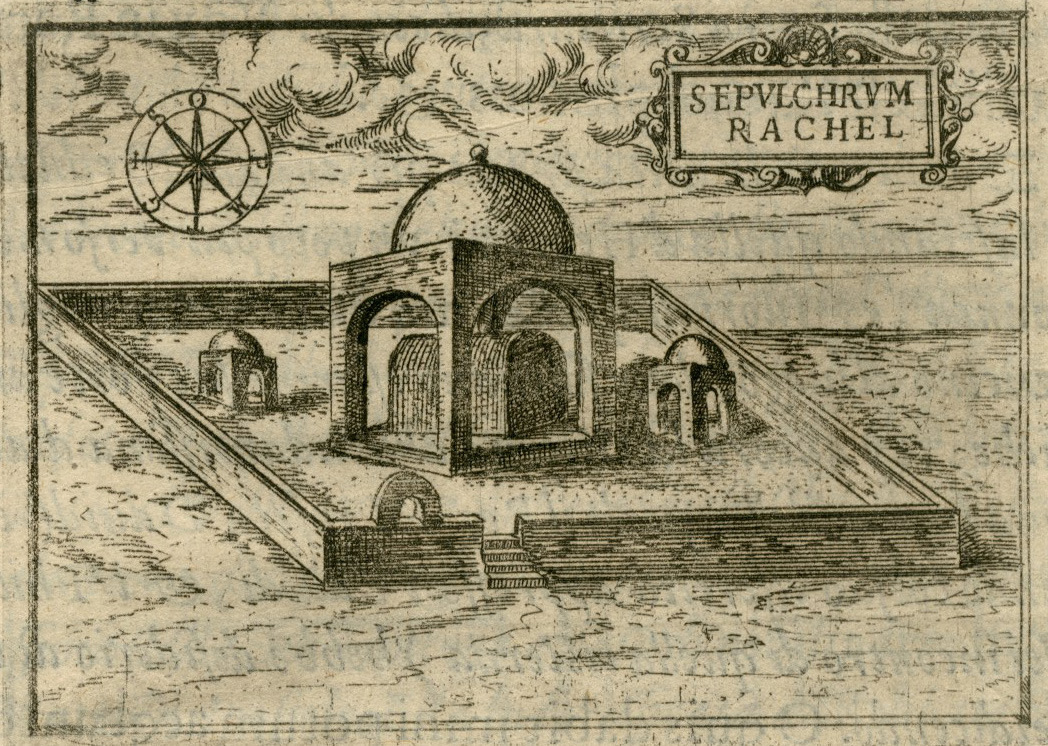
Jean Zuallart, 1587

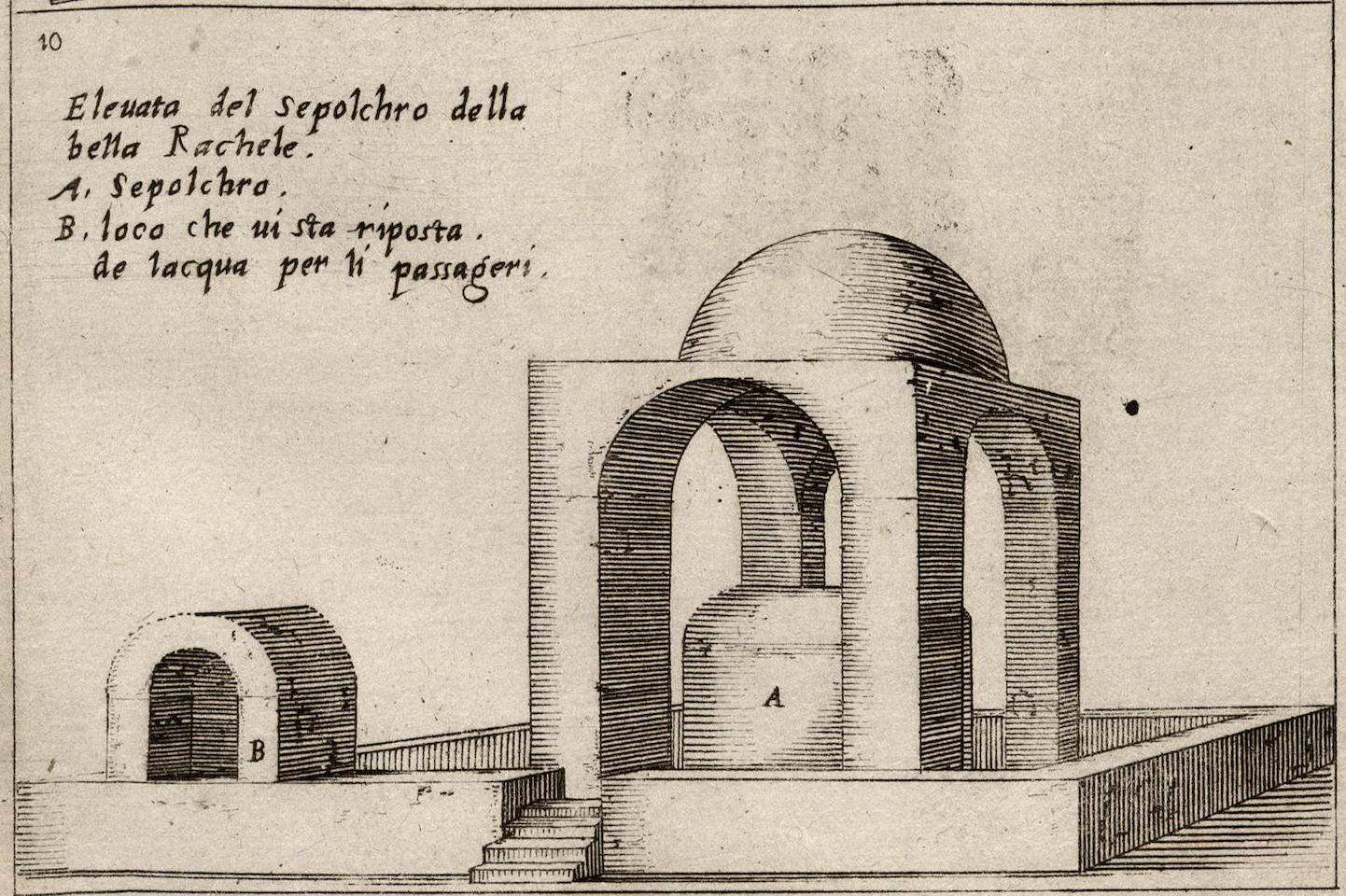
Bernardino Amico, c. 1596

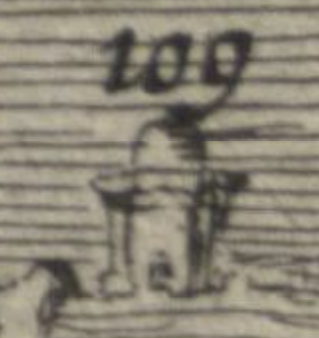
Anonymous, 1639

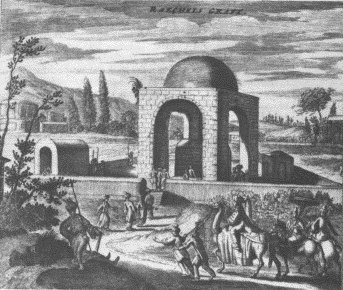
Olfert Dapper, 1677

16th and 17th century engravings show a Chahartaq structure

==== Seventeenth century ====
According to legend, Mehmet Pasha of Jerusalem repaired the structure in 1625 and granted exclusive access to Jews. A 1636 book says that Mehmet favored Jewish settlement in Jerusalem in 1625, and Samuel ben David, a Karaite from Crimea, reported in 1642 that "Mehmet Pasha built a beautiful qubba building over her tomb, as graceful as a dove in flight." (Note: All material from the Firkovich library must be cited with caution, as many of the manuscripts are forged.) In 1664, Eugène Roger wrote that "Mehmet Pasha of Jerusalem repaired the dome twenty-five years ago . . . it has been declared a mosque".

In 1626, Franciscus Quaresmius visited the site and "heard from the elders that the tomb had sometime collapsed, but that it was continually restored in her memory and thus retained its dignity . . . on the front of the tomb, facing the road, is an inscription, but I could not determine the language". George Sandys wrote in 1632 that “The sepulchre of Rachel... is mounted on a square... within which another sepulchre is used for a place of prayer by the Mohometans".

Moses Poryat of Prague (1650) described a high dome, one side opening to a walled courtyard, and Jewish ritual observance:

The tomb of Rachel the Righteous is at a distance of 1½ miles from Jerusalem, in the middle of the field, not far from Bethlehem, as it says in the Torah. On Passover and Lag B'Omer many people—men and women, young and old—go out to Rachel's Tomb on foot and on horseback. There they pray, make petitions, dance around the tomb, and eat and drink. Over the tomb is a high dome . . .

— Moses Poryat of Prague (1650).

According to Giovanni Mariti, Mehmed IV "entertained a peculiar veneration for this sepulchre, and in the year 1679 sent orders for its being repaired . . . it was perhaps entirely rebuilt by Mehmed IV in 1679".

==== Eighteenth century ====
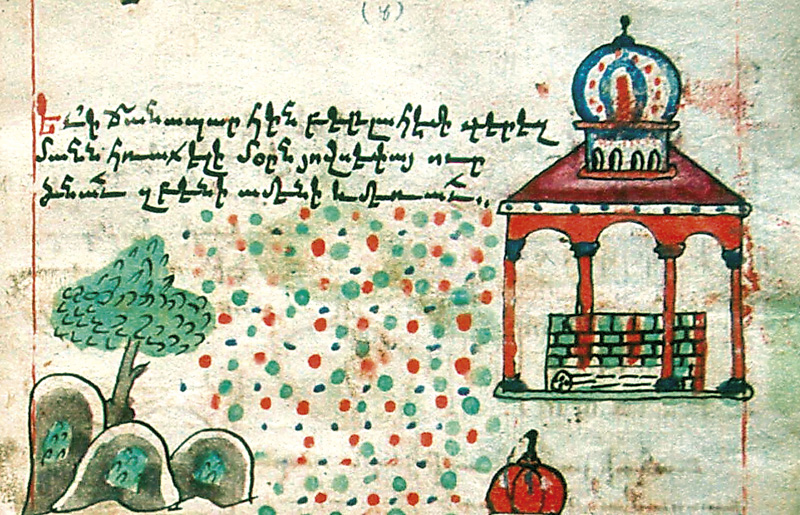
In an Armenian manuscript produced in Jerusalem, 1697

Gedaliah of Siemiatycze, who lived in Jerusalem from 1700 to 1706, writes that "Wayfarers rest at the tomb to avoid the sun in summer and the rain in winter. And every year in Elul, the prince of the Sephardim goes there with other eminences and sleeps there and learns all night, taking with him Arabs for protection." According to Richard Pococke, the arches had "lately been filled up to hinder the Jews from going into it" as of 4 April, 1738. In March 1756, the Istanbul Jewish Committee for the Jews of Palestine instructed that 500 kuruş used by the Jews of Jerusalem to fix a wall at the tomb were to be repaid and used instead for more deserving causes. On 25 April, 1767 Giovanni Mariti visited, finding the site "almost ruined" but the arches "open from top to bottom". Mariti apparently penetrated the sarcophagus and writes that it is completely empty. Moses of Jerusalem wrote (Amsterdam, 1769) that "The tomb is closed. The building has three windows and to enter one must pay an Arab attendant," but this author may have relied on old reports. Eugene Hoade says that the arches were re-walled in 1788. Nachmu ben Solomon, a Karaite from Kale, reported in 1795 "we entered the qubba and said the appropriate prayers . . . the qubba is extremely large and tall."

Pococke reports that the site was highly regarded by Turks as a place of burial, and that the ground had been raised by the number of graves. According to Mariti, the early-modern outbuildings were locals' tombs.

==== Nineteenth century ====
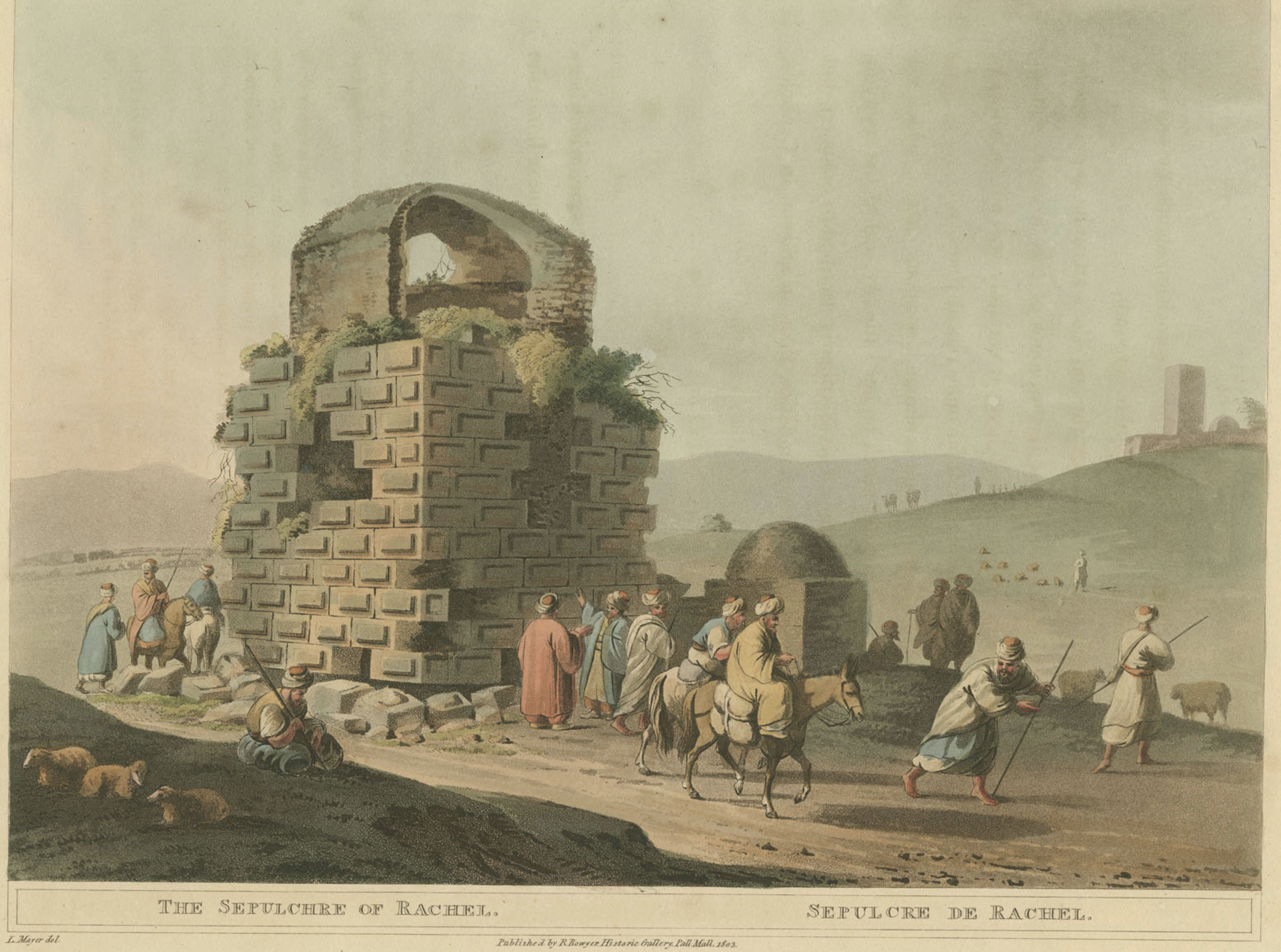
Aquataint by Luigi Mayer (1803)

In 1806 François-René Chateaubriand described it as "a square edifice, surmounted with a small dome: it enjoys the privileges of a mosque, for the Turks as well as the Arabs, honour the families of the patriarchs. [..] it is evidently a Turkish edifice, erected in memory of a santon.

An 1824 report described "a stone building, evidently of Turkish construction, which terminates at the top in a dome. Within this edifice is the tomb. It is a pile of stones covered with white plaster, about 10 feet long and nearly as high. The inner wall of the building and the sides of the tomb are covered with Hebrew names, inscribed by Jews." When the structure was undergoing repairs in around 1825, excavations at the foot of the monument revealed that it was not built directly over an underground cavity. However, a small distance from the site, an unusually deep cavern was discovered.

In the 1820s, John Carne, who described the harsh exclusion of Jews from Rachel's Tomb and the hostility they faced if they approached, wrote: "Was a Jew to cross the procession (of a funeral heading to the site), at this moment, he would be treated with deep curses, and looks of hatred and scorn, by the very people who are about to kneel around the ashes of one of this ancestors. Deeply fallen nation! forbidden even to draw near or bow down at the place that is full of the remembrance of its ancient greatness. So rigidly are the Jews excluded from entering the monument, that the four arches which support the simple dome have been filled up."

Proto-Zionist banker Sir Moses Montefiore visited Rachel's Tomb together with his wife on their first visit to the Holy Land in 1828. The couple were childless, and Lady Montefiore was deeply moved by the tomb, which was in good condition at that time. Before the couple's next visit, in 1839, the Galilee earthquake of 1837 had heavily damaged the tomb. In 1838 the tomb was described as "merely an ordinary Muslim Wely, or tomb of a holy person; a small square building of stone with a dome, and within it a tomb in the ordinary Muhammedan form; the whole plastered over with mortar. It is neglected and falling to decay; though pilgrimages are still made to it by the Jews. The naked walls are covered with names in several languages; many of them Hebrew."

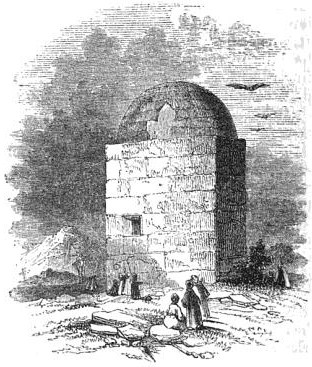
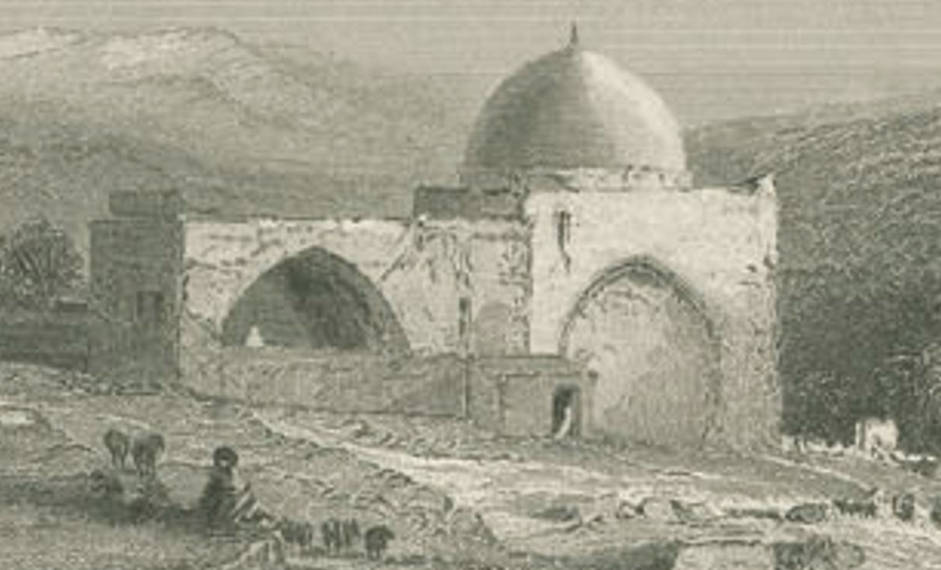
The tomb in 1840 (left) and 1845 (right), before and after Montefiore's renovations

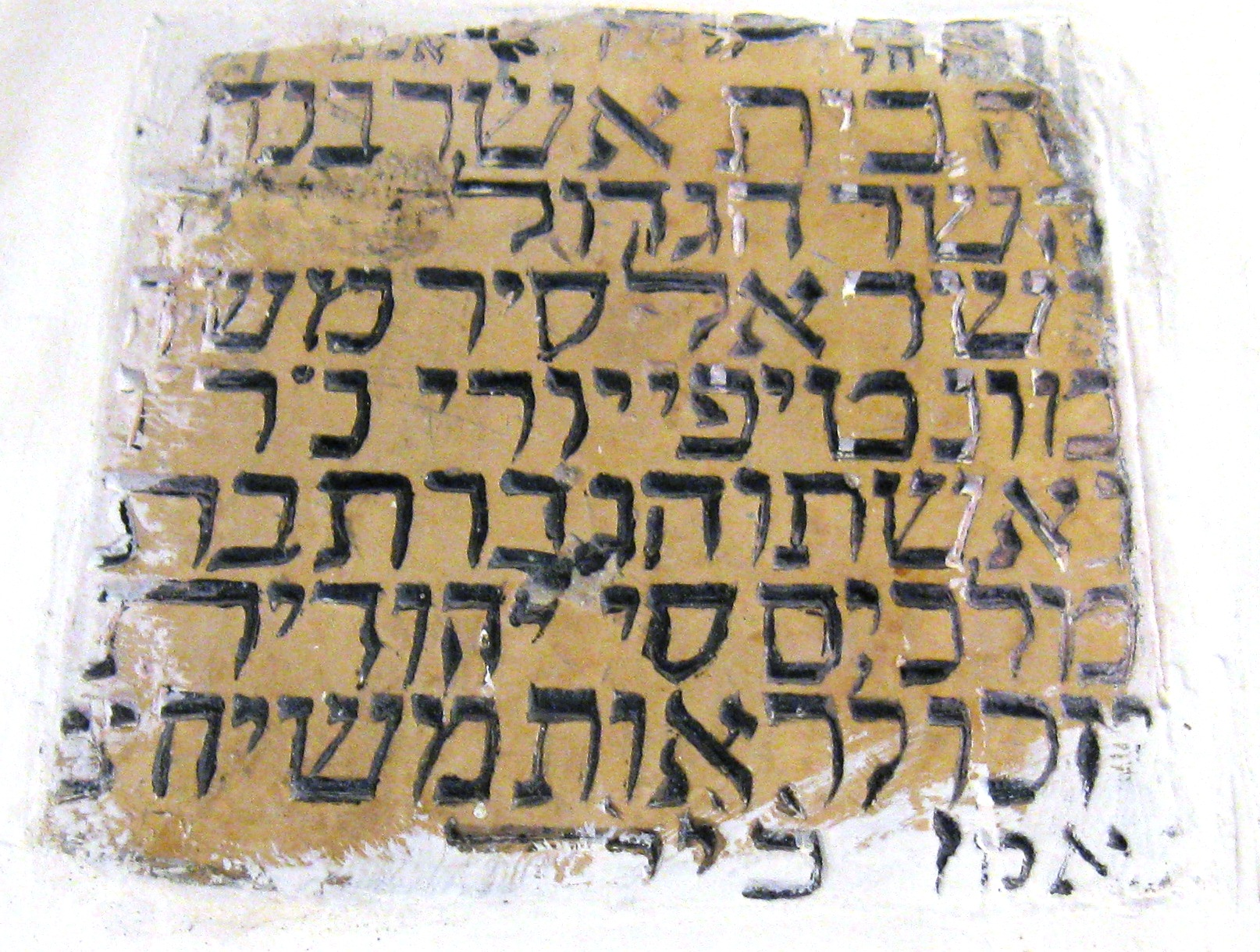
Plaque inside the tomb acknowledging the Montefiore renovations: Hebrew: הבית אשר בנה השר הגדול . . . ישראל סיר משה מונטיפייורי נר"ו ואשתו הגברת בת המלכים, סי' יהודית, יזכו לראות משיח צ' אמן כי"ר., lit. 'This is the house which was built by the great Prince, the . . of Israel, Sir Moses Montefiore, may God protect him, and his wife, the daughter of kings, Lady Judith. May they merit to see our righteous messiah. Amen. May it be His will.'

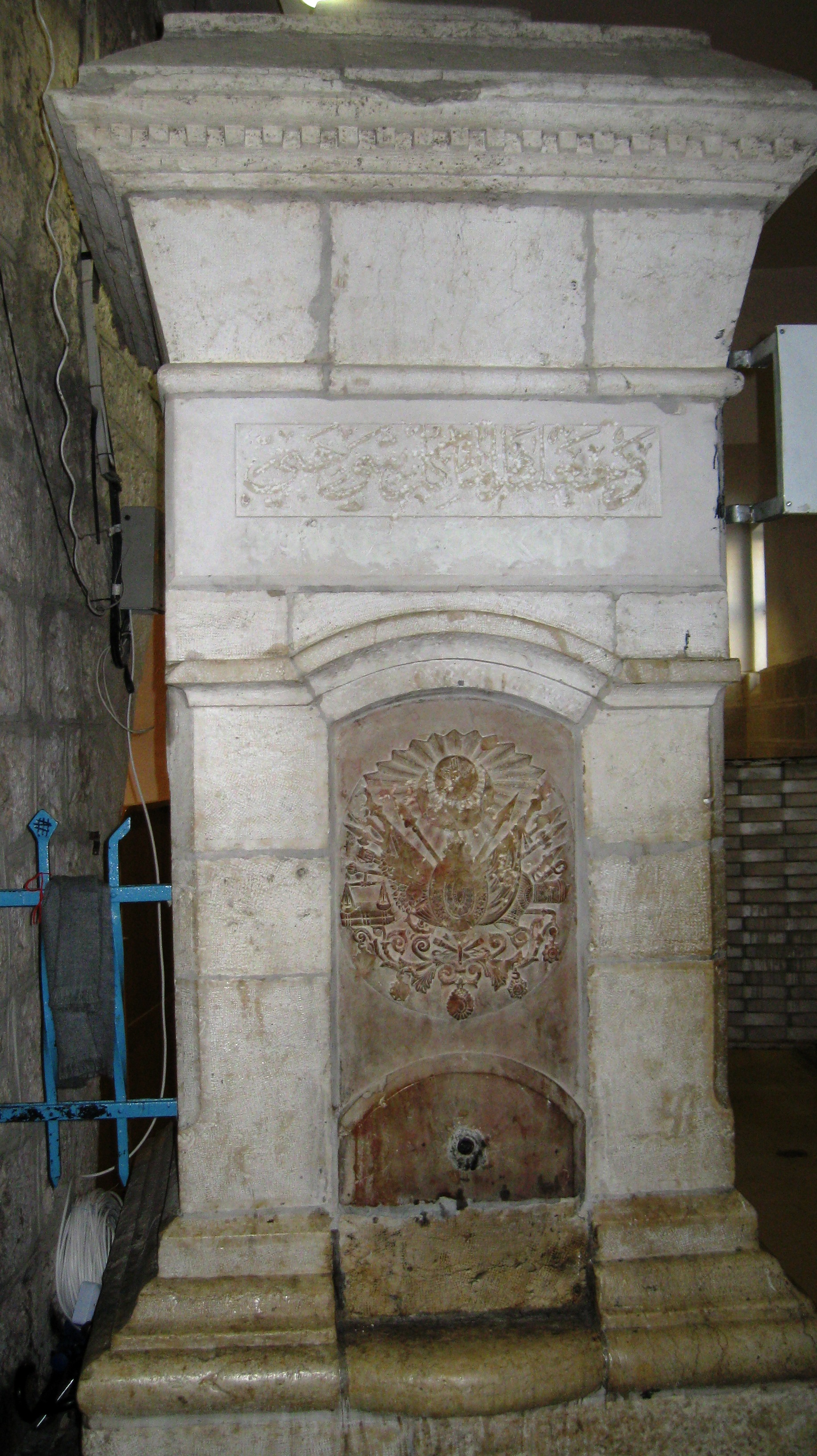
One of the two Sebils, containing the coat of arms of the Ottoman Empire (now partially defaced), in 2008. The Arabic inscription, which has since been covered up, is from verse 30 of chapter 21 of the Quran: Arabic: وَجَعَلْنَا مِنَ ٱلْمَآءِ كُلَّ شَىْءٍ حَىٍّ, lit. 'And we created from water every living thing'

In 1841, Montefiore renovated the site and obtained for the Jews the key of the tomb. He renovated the entire structure, reconstructing and re-plastering its white dome, and added an antechamber, including a mihrab for Muslim prayer, to ease Muslim fears. Professor Glenn Bowman notes that some writers have described this as a “purchase” of the tomb by Montefiore, asserting that this was not the case.

In 1843, Ridley Haim Herschell described the building as an ordinary Muslim tomb. He reported that Jews, including Montefiore, were obliged to remain outside the tomb, and prayed at a hole in the wall, so that their voices enter into the tomb. In 1844, William Henry Bartlett referred to the tomb as a "Turkish Mosque", following a visit to the area in 1842.

In 1845, Montefiore made further architectural improvements at the tomb. He extended the building by constructing an adjacent vaulted ante-chamber on the east for Muslim prayer use and burial preparation, possibly as an act of conciliation. The room included a mihrab facing Mecca.

In the mid-1850s, the marauding Arab et-Ta'amreh tribe forced the Jews to furnish them with an annual £30 payment to prevent them from damaging the tomb.

British consul James Finn recounted an incident in which Arab villagers from Kuffin, near Hebron, attempted to plunder and strip Jewish worshippers at Rachel's Tomb. However, locals from Bethlehem, who were present nearby, intervened and declared that the Jews were under English protection, after which the assailants withdrew. According to Elizabeth Anne Finn, the wife of James Finn, the only time the Sephardic Jewish community left the Old City of Jerusalem was for monthly prayers at "Rachel's Sepulchre" or Hebron.

In 1864, the Jews of Bombay donated money to dig a well. Although Rachel's Tomb was only an hour and a half walk from the Old City of Jerusalem, many pilgrims found themselves very thirsty and unable to obtain fresh water. Every Rosh Chodesh (beginning of the Jewish month), the Maiden of Ludmir would lead her followers to Rachel's tomb and lead a prayer service with various rituals, which included spreading out requests of the past four weeks over the tomb. On the traditional anniversary of Rachel's death, she would lead a solemn procession to the tomb where she chanted psalms in a night-long vigil.

In 1868 a publication by the Catholic missionary society the Paulist Fathers noted that "[Rachel's] memory has always been held in respect by the Jews and Christians, and even now the former go there every Thursday, to pray and read the old, old history of this mother of their race. When leaving Bethlehem for the fourth and last time, after we had passed the tomb of Rachel, on our way to Jerusalem, Father Luigi and I met a hundred or more Jews on their weekly visit to the venerated spot."

The Hebrew monthly ha-Levanon of August 19, 1869, rumored that a group of Christians had purchased land around the tomb and were in the process of demolishing Montefiore's vestibule in order to erect a church there. During the following years, land in the vicinity of the tomb was acquired by Nathan Straus. In October 1875, Rabbi Zvi Hirsch Kalischer purchased three dunams of land near the tomb intending to establish a Jewish farming colony there. Custody of the land was transferred to the Perushim community in Jerusalem. In the 1883 volume of the PEF Survey of Palestine, Conder and Kitchener noted: "A modern Moslem building stands over the site, and there are Jewish graves near it... The court... is used as a praying-place by Moslems... The inner chambers... are visited by Jewish men and women on Fridays."

==== Twentieth century ====
In 1912 the Ottoman Government permitted the Jews to repair the shrine itself, but not the antechamber. In 1915 the structure had four walls, each about 7 m (23 ft.) long and 6 m (20 ft.) high. The dome, rising about 3 m (10 ft.), "is used by the Moslems for prayer; its holy character has hindered them from removing the Hebrew letters from its walls."

=== British Mandate period ===
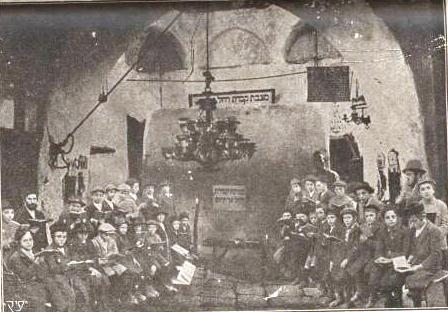
Etz Chaim Talmud Torah students visiting the tomb, 1930s

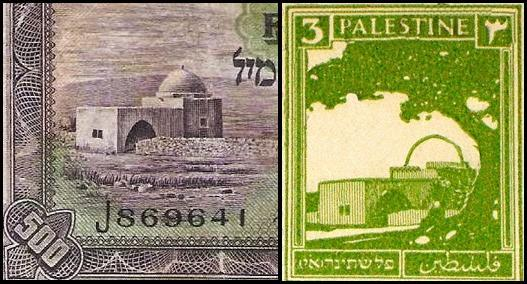
Rachel's tomb appeared on the 500 m. banknote and on 2 m., 3 m. and 10 m. stamps of Mandate Palestine between 1927 and 1945, due to it being perceived by the British authorities as “the model of a shared site” among Muslims, Christians and Jews.

Three months after the British occupation of Palestine the whole place was cleaned and whitewashed by the Jews without protest from the Muslims. However, in 1921 when the Chief Rabbinate applied to the Municipality of Bethlehem for permission to perform repairs at the site, local Muslims objected. In view of this, the High Commissioner ruled that, pending appointment of the Holy Places Commission provided for under the Mandate, all repairs should be undertaken by the Government. However, so much indignation was caused in Jewish circles by this decision that the matter was dropped, the repairs not being considered urgent. In 1925 the Sephardic Jewish community requested permission to repair the tomb. The building was then made structurally sound and exterior repairs were effected by the Government, but permission was refused by the Jews (who had the keys) for the Government to repair the interior of the shrine. As the interior repairs were unimportant, the Government dropped the matter, in order to avoid controversy. In 1926 Max Bodenheimer blamed the Jews for letting one of their holy sites appear so neglected and uncared for.

During this period, both Jews and Muslims visited the site. From the 1940s, it came to be viewed as a symbol of the Jewish people's return to Zion, to its ancient homeland. For Jewish women, the tomb was associated with fertility and became a place of pilgrimage to pray for successful childbirth. Depictions of the Tomb of Rachel have appeared in Jewish religious books and works of art. Muslims prayed inside the mosque there and the cemetery at the tomb was the main Muslim cemetery in the Bethlehem area. The building was also used for Islamic funeral rituals. It is reported that Jews and Muslims respected each other and accommodated each other's rituals. During the riots of 1929, violence hampered regular visits by Jews to the tomb. Both Jews and Muslims demanded control of the site, with the Muslims claiming it was an integral part of the Muslim cemetery within which it is situated. It also demanded a renewal of the old Muslim custom of purifying corpses in the tomb's antechamber.

=== Jordanian period ===
Following the 1948 Arab–Israeli War till 1967, the site was occupied then annexed by Jordan. the site was overseen by the Islamic waqf. On December 11, 1948, the UN General Assembly passed Resolution 194 which called for free access to all the holy places in Israel and the remainder of the territory of the former Palestine Mandate of Great Britain. In April 1949, the Jerusalem Committee prepared a document for the UN Secretariat in order to establish the status of the different holy places in the area of the former British Mandate for Palestine. It noted that ownership of Rachel's Tomb was claimed by both Jews and Muslims. The Jews claimed possession by virtue of a 1615 firman granted by the Pasha of Jerusalem which gave them exclusive use of the site and that the building, which had fallen into decay, was entirely restored by Moses Montefiore in 1845; the keys were obtained by the Jews from the last Muslim guardian at this time. The Muslims claimed the site was a place of Muslim prayer and an integral part of the Muslim cemetery within which it was situated. They stated that the Ottoman Government had recognised it as such and that it is included among the Tombs of the Prophets for which identity signboards were issued by the Ministry of Waqfs in 1898. They also asserted that the antechamber built by Montefiore was specially built as a place of prayer for Muslims. The UN ruled that the status quo, an arrangement approved by the Ottoman Decree of 1757 concerning rights, privileges and practices in certain Holy Places, apply to the site.

In theory, free access was to be granted as stipulated in the 1949 Armistice Agreements, though Israelis, unable to enter Jordan, were prevented from visiting. Non-Israeli Jews, however, continued to visit the site. During this period the Muslim cemetery was expanded.

=== Israeli control ===
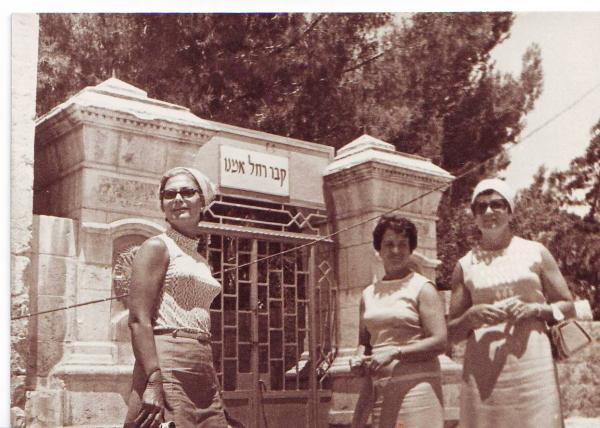
The family of MK Yosef Tamir standing next to the two Ottoman Sebils, immediately after the Six-Day War in 1967

Following the Six-Day War in 1967, Israel occupied of the West Bank, which included the tomb. The tomb was placed under Israeli military administration. Prime minister Levi Eshkol instructed that the tomb be included within the new expanded municipal borders of Jerusalem, but citing security concerns, Moshe Dayan decided not to include it within the territory that was annexed to Jerusalem.

Islamic crescents, inscribed into the rooms of the structure, were subsequently erased. Muslims were prevented from using the mosque, although they were allowed to use the cemetery for a while. Starting in 1993, Muslims were barred from using the cemetery. According to Bethlehem University, "[a]ccess to Rachel's Tomb is now restricted to tourists entering from Israel."

==== Oslo negotiations: Area A and Special Security Arrangement ====
Rachel's Tomb
a. Without derogating from Palestinian security responsibility in the City of Bethlehem, the two sides hereby agree on the following security arrangements regarding Rachel's Tomb which will be considered a special case during the Interim Period:

(1) While the Tomb, as well as the main road leading from Jerusalem to the Tomb, as indicated on map No.1, will be under the security responsibility of Israel, the free movement of Palestinians on the main road will continue.
(2) For the purpose of protecting the Tomb, three Israeli guard posts may be located in the Tomb, the roof of the Waqf building, and the parking lot.

b. The present situation and existing practices in the Tomb shall be preserved.

— Oslo II Accord, Israel-PLO, 28 September 1995, Interim Agreement on the West Bank and the Gaza Strip, Annex I, Article V, Part 7

The Oslo II Accord of September 28, 1995 placed Rachel's Tomb in a Palestinian enclave (Area A), with a special arrangement making it – together with the main Jerusalem-Bethlehem access road – subject to the security responsibility of Israel.

Initially the arrangement was intended to be the same as that for Joseph's Tomb near Nablus; however this was reconsidered following a significant reaction from Israel's right-wing religious parties. With the explicit intention of creating facts on the ground, in July 1995 MK Hanan Porat established a yeshiva at the tomb, and right-wing activists began trying to acquire land around the tomb to create contiguity with Israeli-annexed areas of Jerusalem. On 17 July 1995, following a meeting of Rabin's cabinet and security forces, the Israeli position was changed to demand that an Israeli force provide security at the tomb and control the access road to it. When this demand was put to Yasser Arafat during the negotiations, he is said to have responded:

I cannot agree to this! Next to Rachel’s Tomb there is a Muslim cemetery and the holy place is located in Area A and I myself am a descendant of Rachel

— Yasser Arafat, during the Oslo negotiations

The Palestinians were also strongly against conceding control of the road linking Bethlehem to Jerusalem, but ultimately conceded in order not to threaten the overall accords.

On December 1, 1995, the rest of Bethlehem, with the sole exception of the tomb enclave, passed under the full control of the Palestinian Authority.

==== Fortification ====
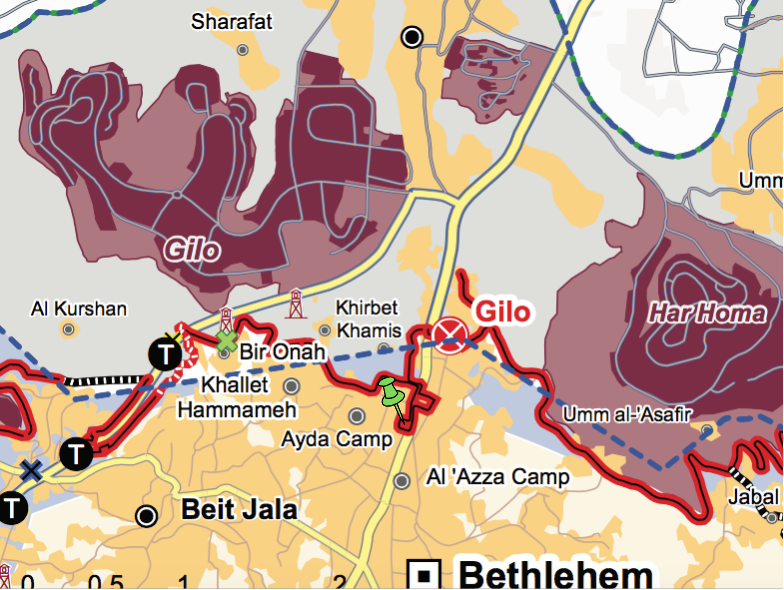
UN map with a green pin added showing the current location of the tomb, surrounded on all sides by the Israeli West Bank barrier (shown in red). The tomb is situated east and north, respectively, of the Ayda and 'Azza Palestinian refugee camps, and south of Checkpoint 300 and the Israeli settlements of Gilo and Har Homa. The tomb is in the Seam Zone: the green-blue line at the top of the map represents the border of the West Bank and Israel, and the blue dashed line just north of the tomb represents the unilaterally-declared municipal boundary of Jerusalem

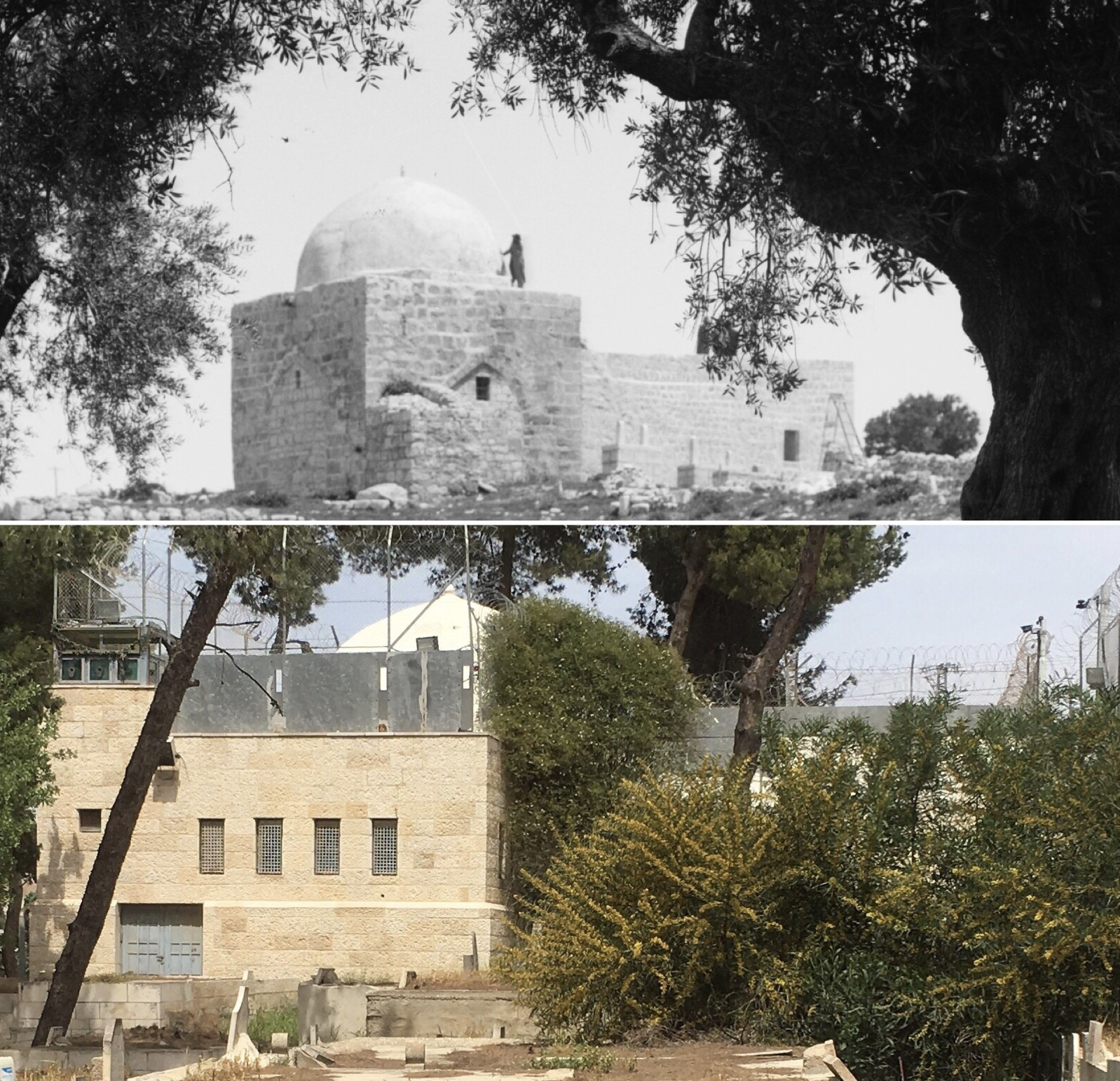
Comparison of the southern view of the Tomb in the early 20th and 21st centuries, showing the fortifications

In 1996, Israel began an 18-month fortification of the site at a cost of $2m. It included a 13-foot-high (4.0 m) wall and adjacent military post.

After an attack on Joseph's Tomb and its subsequent takeover and desecration by Arabs, hundreds of residents of Bethlehem and the Aida refugee camp, led by the Palestinian Authority-appointed governor of Bethlehem, Muhammad Rashad al-Jabari, attacked Rachel's Tomb. They set the scaffolding that had been erected around it on fire and tried to break in. The IDF dispersed the mob with gunfire and stun grenades, and dozens were wounded. In the following years, the Israeli-controlled site became a flashpoint between young Palestinians who hurled stones, bottles and firebombs and IDF troops, who responded with tear gas and rubber bullets.

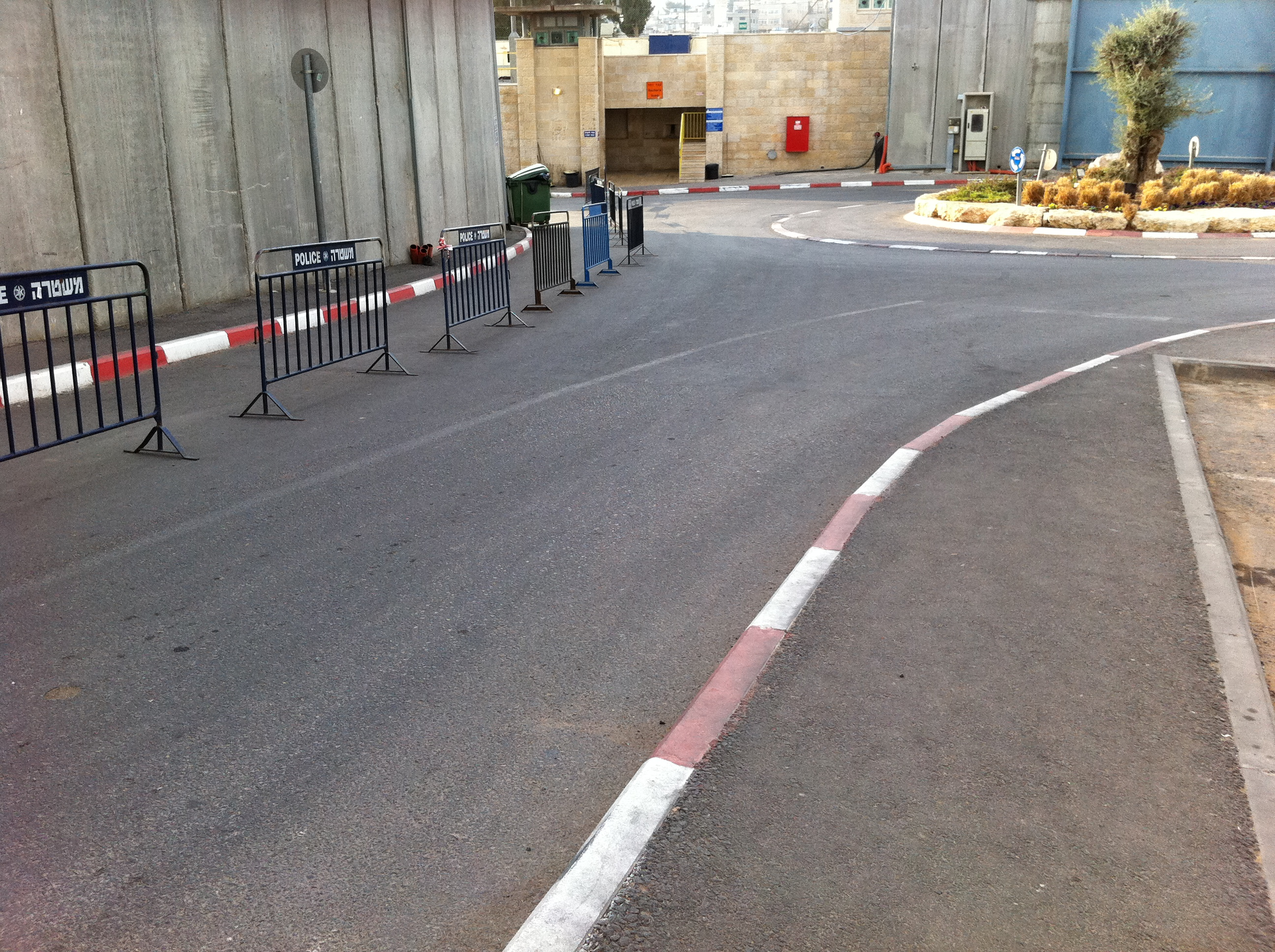
Fortified entrance road to the tomb, surrounded by the Israeli West Bank barrier

At the end of 2000, when the Second Intifada broke out, the tomb came under attack for 41 days. In May 2001, fifty Jews found themselves trapped inside by a firefight between the IDF and Palestinian Authority gunmen. In March 2002 the IDF returned to Bethlehem as part of Operation Defensive Shield and remained there for an extended period of time.

On 11 September 2002, the Israeli security cabinet approved incorporating the tomb on the Israeli side of the West Bank barrier and surrounded by a concrete wall and watchtowers. This has been described as "de facto annexing it to Jerusalem". In February 2005, the Israel Supreme Court rejected a Palestinian appeal to change the route of the barrier in the region of the tomb. Israeli construction destroyed the Palestinian neighbourhood of Qubbet Rahil (Tomb of Rachel), which comprised 11% of metropolitan Bethlehem. Israel also declared the area to be a part of Jerusalem. From 2011, a "Wall Museum" was created by Palestinians on the North wall of the Israeli separation barrier surrounding Rachel's tomb.

In February 2010, Israeli Prime Minister Netanyahu announced that the tomb would become a part of the national Jewish heritage sites rehabilitation plan. The decision was opposed by the Palestinian Authority, who saw it as a political decision associated with Israel's settlement project. The UN's special coordinator for the Middle East, Robert Serry, issued a statement of concern over the move, saying that the site is in Palestinian territory and has significance in both Judaism and Islam. The Jordanian government said that the move would derail peace efforts in the Middle East and condemned "unilateral Israeli measures which affect holy places and offend sentiments of Muslims throughout the world". UNESCO urged Israel to remove the site from its heritage list, stating that it was "an integral part of the occupied Palestinian territories". A resolution was passed at UNESCO that acknowledged both the Jewish and Islamic significance of the site, describing the site as both Bilal ibn Rabah Mosque and as Rachel's Tomb. The resolution passed with 44 countries supporting it, twelve countries abstaining, and only the United States voting to oppose. Also writing in the Jerusalem Post, Larry Derfner defended the UNESCO position. He pointed out that UNESCO had explicitly recognized the Jewish connection to the site, having only denounced Israeli claims of sovereignty, while also acknowledging the Islamic and Christian significance of the site. The Israeli Prime Minister's Office criticised the resolution, claiming that: "the attempt to detach the Nation of Israel from its heritage is absurd. ... If the nearly 4,000-year-old burial sites of the Patriarchs and Matriarchs of the Jewish Nation – Abraham, Isaac, Jacob, Sarah, Rebecca, Rachel and Leah – are not part of its culture and tradition, then what is a national cultural site?"

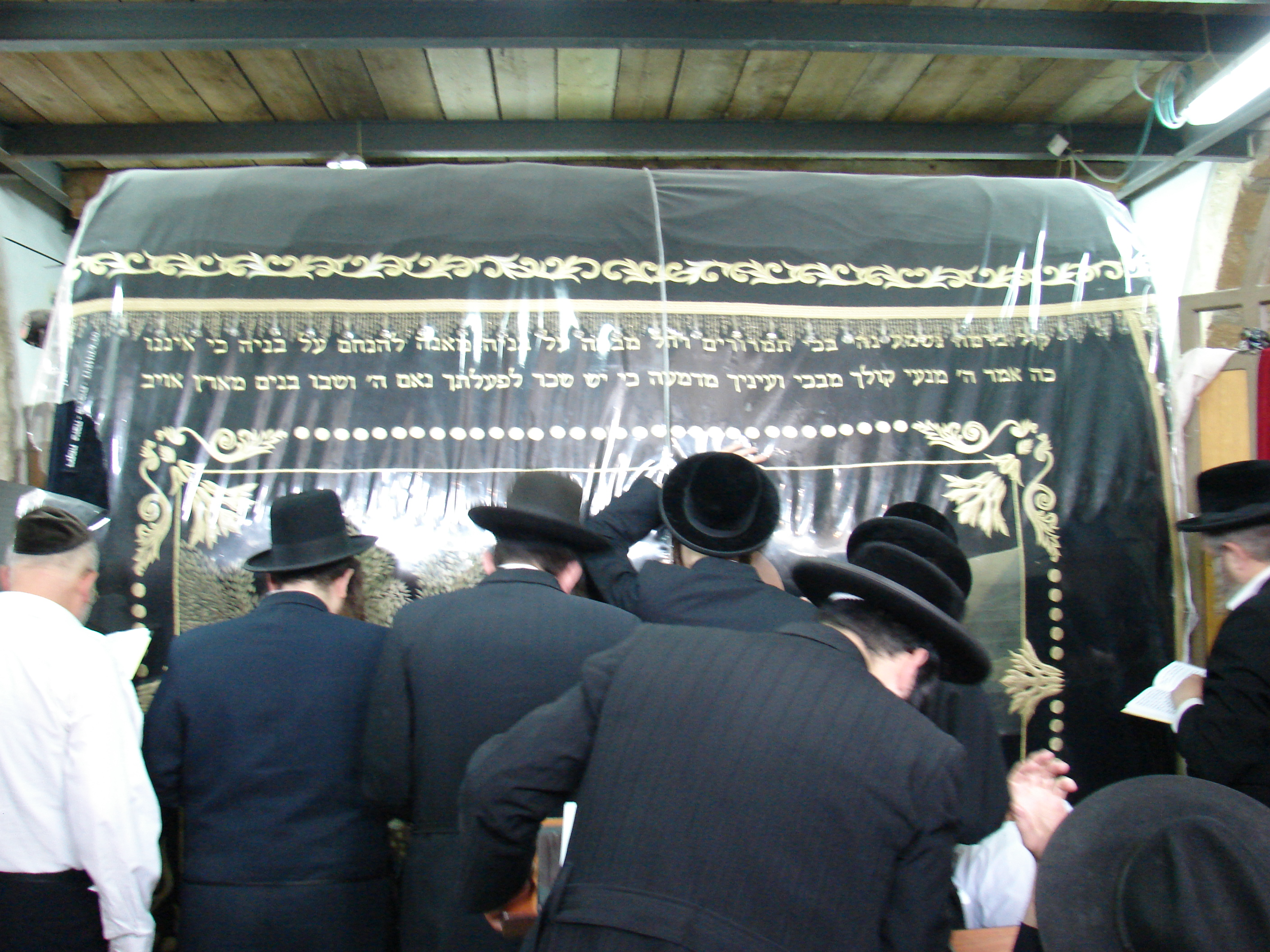
Haredi Jews praying at the tomb

== Jewish religious significance ==
=== Rabbinic traditions ===
In Jewish lore, Rachel died on 11 Cheshvan 1553 BCE.

- According to the Midrash, the first person to pray at Rachel's tomb was her eldest son, Joseph. While he was being carried away to Egypt after his brothers had sold him into slavery, he broke away from his captors and ran to his mother's grave. He threw himself upon the ground, wept aloud and cried "Mother! mother! Wake up. Arise and see my suffering." He heard his mother respond: "Do not fear. Go with them, and God will be with you."
- A number of reasons are given why Rachel was buried by the road side and not in the Cave of Machpela with the other Patriarchs and Matriarchs:
  - Jacob foresaw that following the destruction of the First Temple the Jews would be exiled to Babylon. They would cry out as they passed her grave, and be comforted by her. She would intercede on their behalf, asking for mercy from God who would hear her prayer.
  - Although Rachel was buried within the boundaries of the Holy Land, she was not buried in the Cave of Machpelah due to her sudden and unexpected death. Jacob, looking after his children and herds of cattle, simply did not have the opportunity to embalm her body to allow for the slow journey to Hebron.
  - Jacob was intent on not burying Rachel at Hebron, as he wished to prevent himself feeling ashamed before his forefathers, lest it appear he still regarded both sisters as his wives – a biblically forbidden union.
- According to the mystical work, Zohar, when the Messiah appears, he will lead the dispersed Jews back to the Land of Israel, along the road which passes Rachel's grave.

=== Location ===
Early Jewish scholars noticed an apparent contradiction in the Bible with regards to the location of Rachel's grave. In Genesis, the Bible states that Rachel was buried "on the way to Ephrath, which is Bethlehem". Yet a reference to her tomb in Samuel states: "When you go from me today, you will find two men by Rachel's tomb, in the border of Benjamin, in Zelzah" (1 Sam 10:2). Rashi asks: "Now, isn't Rachel's tomb in the border of Judah, in Bethlehem?" He explains that the verse rather means: "Now they are by Rachel's tomb, and when you will meet them, you will find them in the border of Benjamin, in Zelzah." Similarly, Ramban assumes that the site shown today near Bethlehem reflects an authentic tradition. After he had arrived in Jerusalem and seen "with his own eyes" that Rachel's tomb was on the outskirts of Bethlehem, he retracted his original understanding of her tomb being located north of Jerusalem and concluded that the reference in Jeremiah (Jer 31:15) which seemed to place her burial place in Ramah, is to be understood allegorically. There remains however, a dispute as to whether her tomb near Bethlehem was in the tribal territory of Judah, or of her son Benjamin. Ishtori Haparchi, who arrived in the Land of Israel in the 14th century, also described Rachel's Tomb at its present location: "And behold, the site of Rachel's burial is south of Jerusalem, at a distance of about an hour".

=== Customs ===
A Jewish tradition teaches that Rachel weeps for her children and that when the Jews were taken into exile, she wept as they passed by her grave on the way to Babylonia. Jews have made pilgrimage to the tomb since ancient times.

There is a tradition regarding the key that unlocked the door to the tomb. The key was about 15 centimetres (5.9 in) long and made of brass. The beadle kept it with him at all times, and it was not uncommon that someone would knock at his door in the middle of the night requesting it to ease the labor pains of an expectant mother. The key was placed under her pillow and almost immediately, the pains would subside and the delivery would take place peacefully.

Till this day there is an ancient tradition regarding a segulah or charm which is the most famous women's ritual at the tomb. A red string is wound around the tomb seven times, then worn as a charm for fertility. This use of the string is comparatively recent, though there is a report of its use to ward off diseases in the 1880s.

The Torah Ark in Rachel's Tomb is covered with a curtain (Hebrew: parokhet) made from the wedding gown of Nava Applebaum, a young Israeli woman who was killed by a Palestinian terrorist in a suicide bombing at Café Hillel in Jerusalem in 2003, on the eve of her wedding.

== Replicas ==
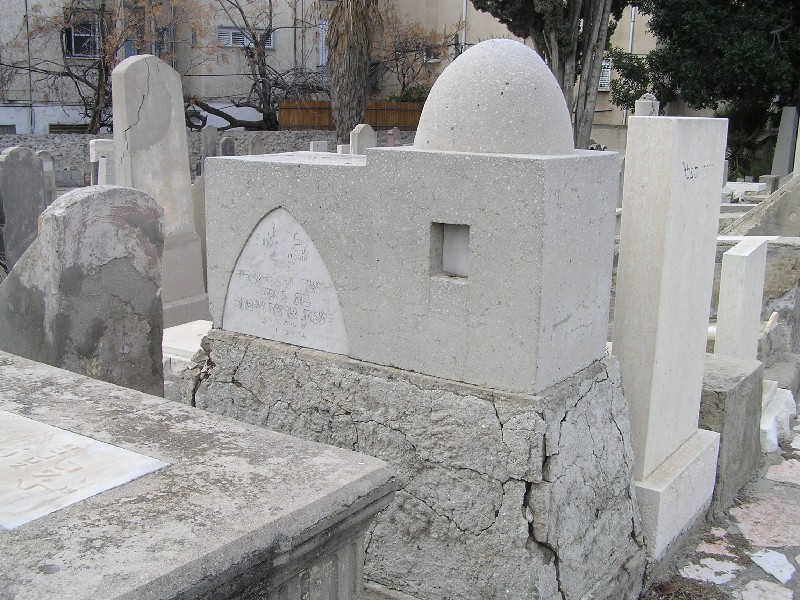
Tombstone in the shape of Rachel's Tomb, Trumpeldor Cemetery, Tel Aviv

The tomb of Sir Moses Montefiore, adjacent to the Montefiore synagogue in Ramsgate, England, is a replica of Rachel's Tomb.

In 1934, the Michigan Memorial Park planned to reproduce the tomb. When built, it was used to house the sound system and pipe organ used during funerals, but it has since been demolished.

== See also ==
- Ancient synagogues in Israel
- History of the Jews in Palestine
- Islam in Palestine
- List of mosques in Palestine
- List of oldest synagogues
- List of National Heritage Sites of Israel

== Gallery ==
=== North-east perspective ===
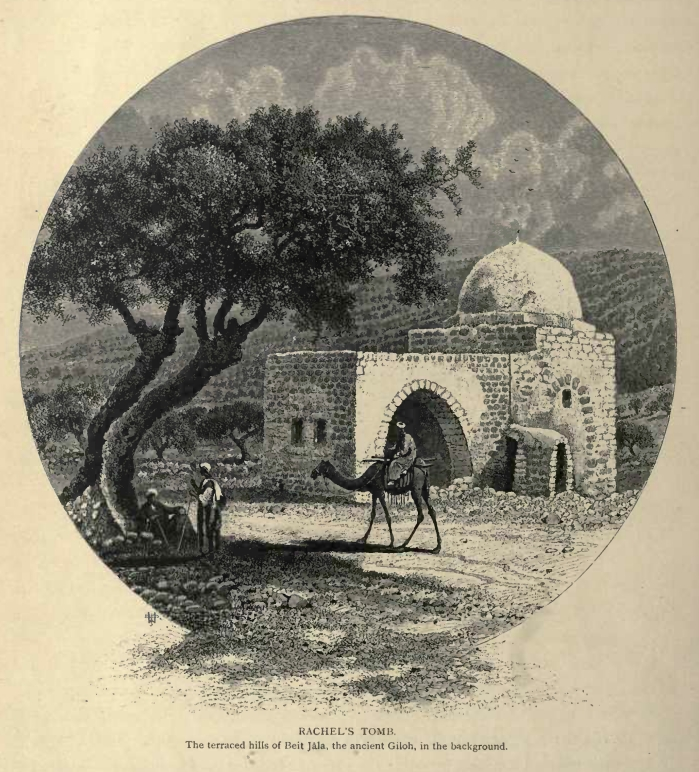
c.1880

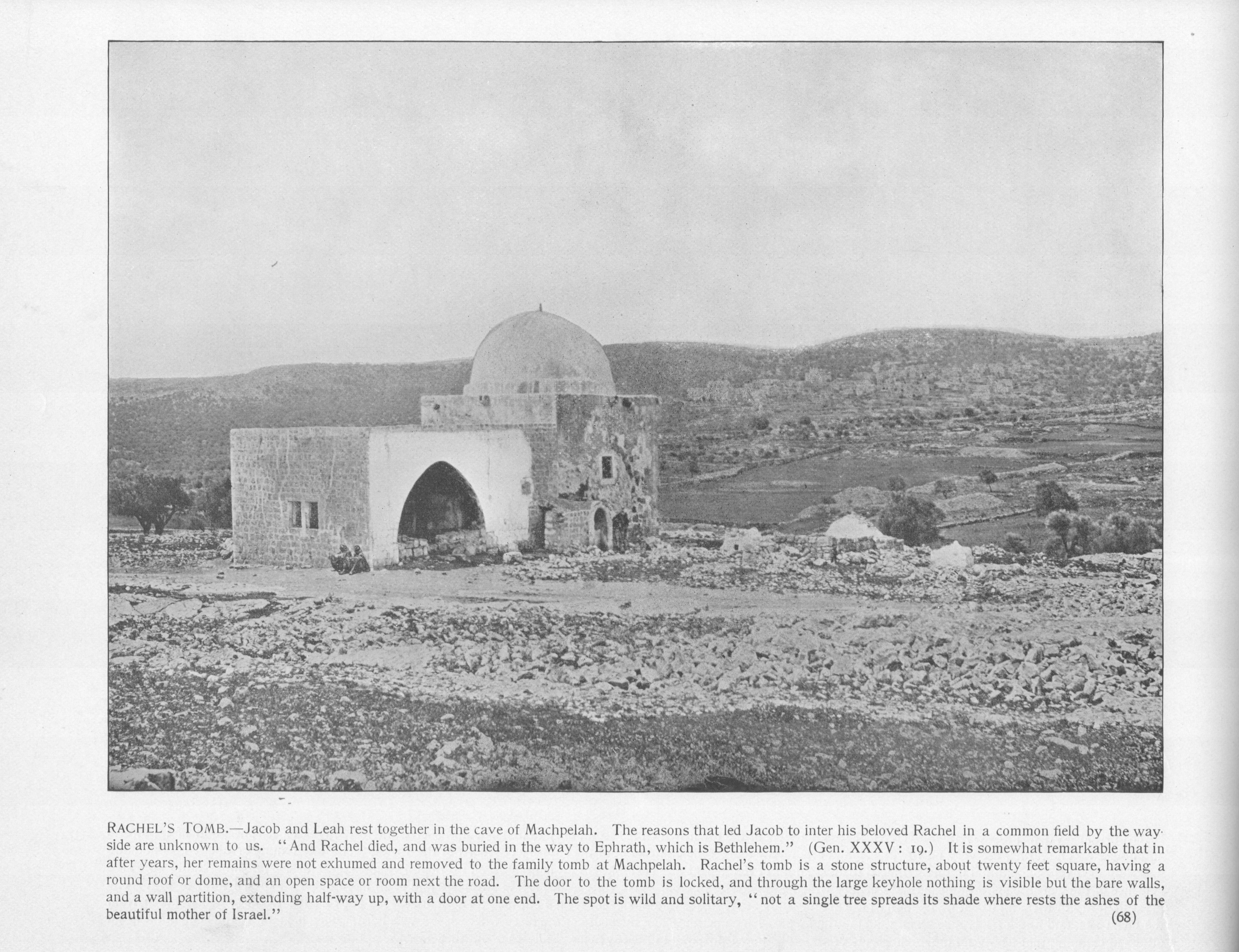
1894

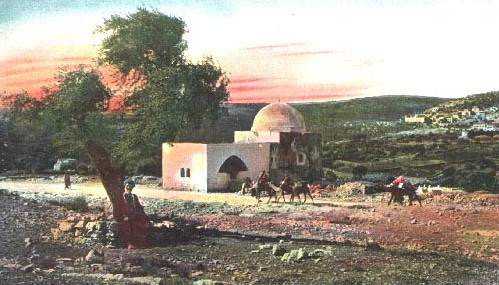
c.1910

1933

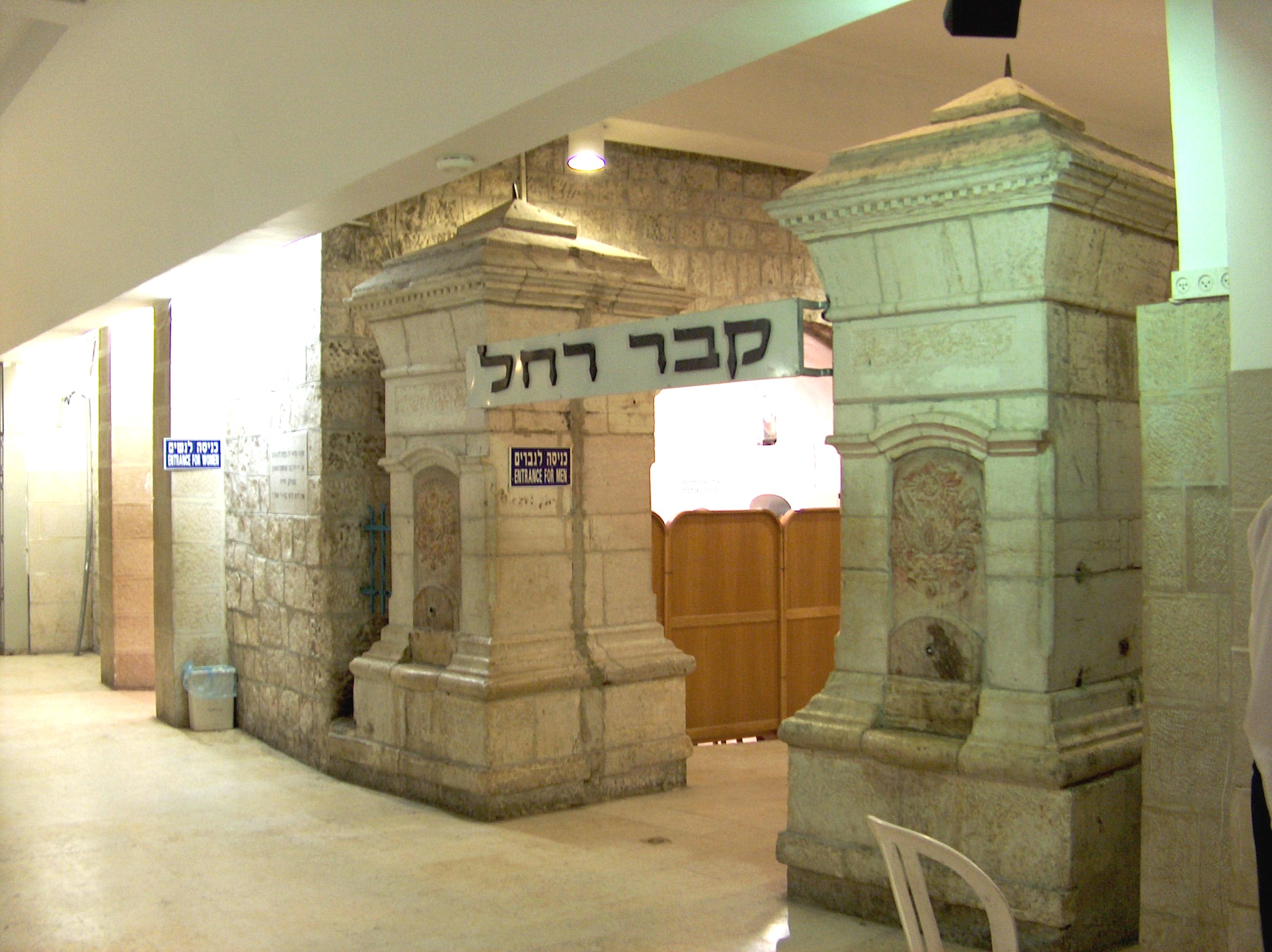
2005 showing the two Ottoman Sebils (now inside the expanded compound)

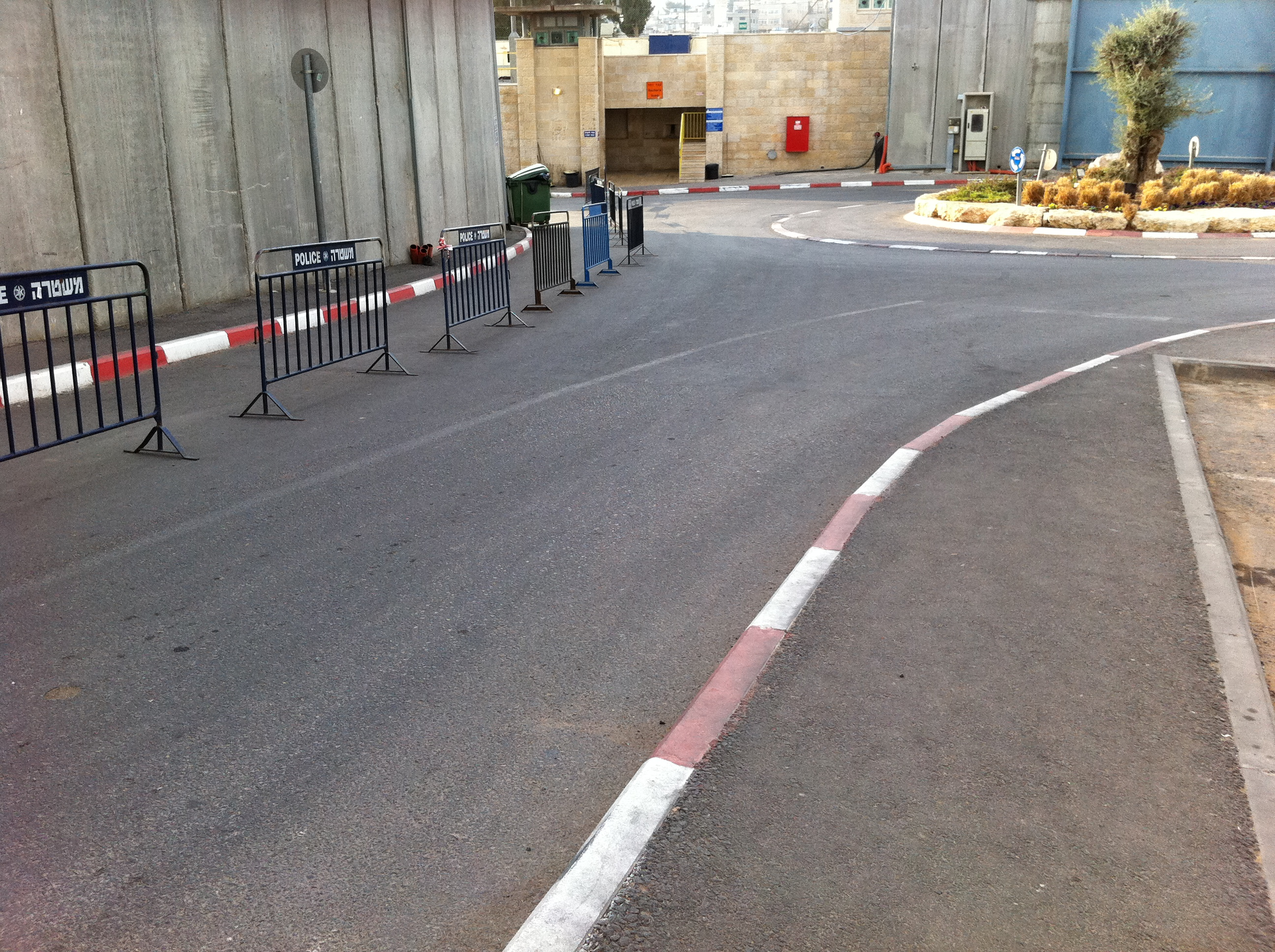
2011
- Mid 1990s North-east perspective available externally:
- 2008 picture of the same North-east perspective:

=== North perspective ===
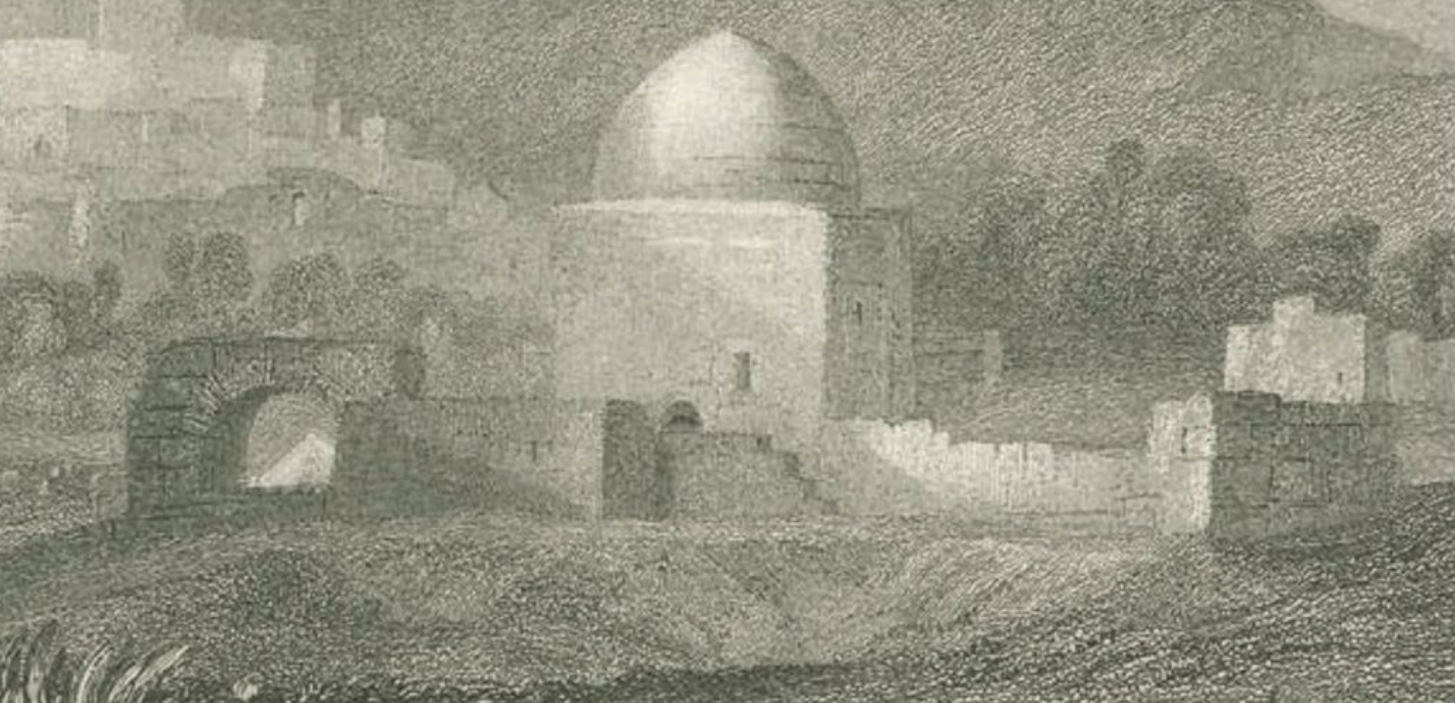
1836

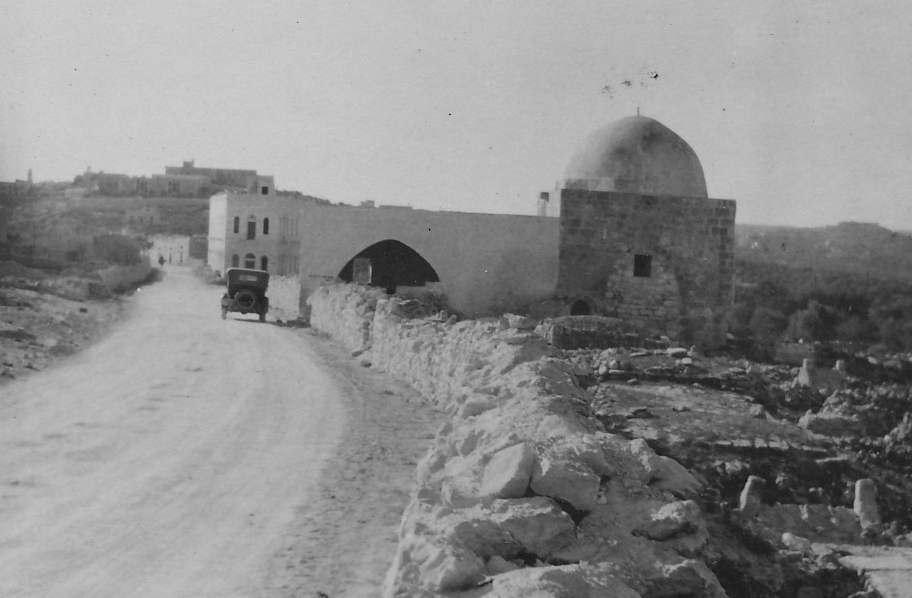
1930s

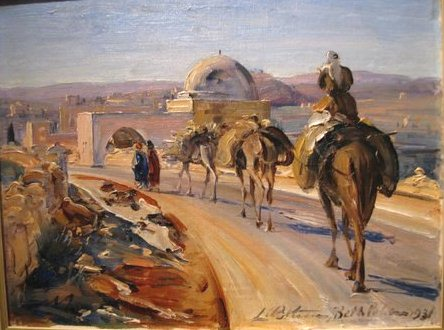
1939 painting of Rachel's Tomb by Ludwig Blum

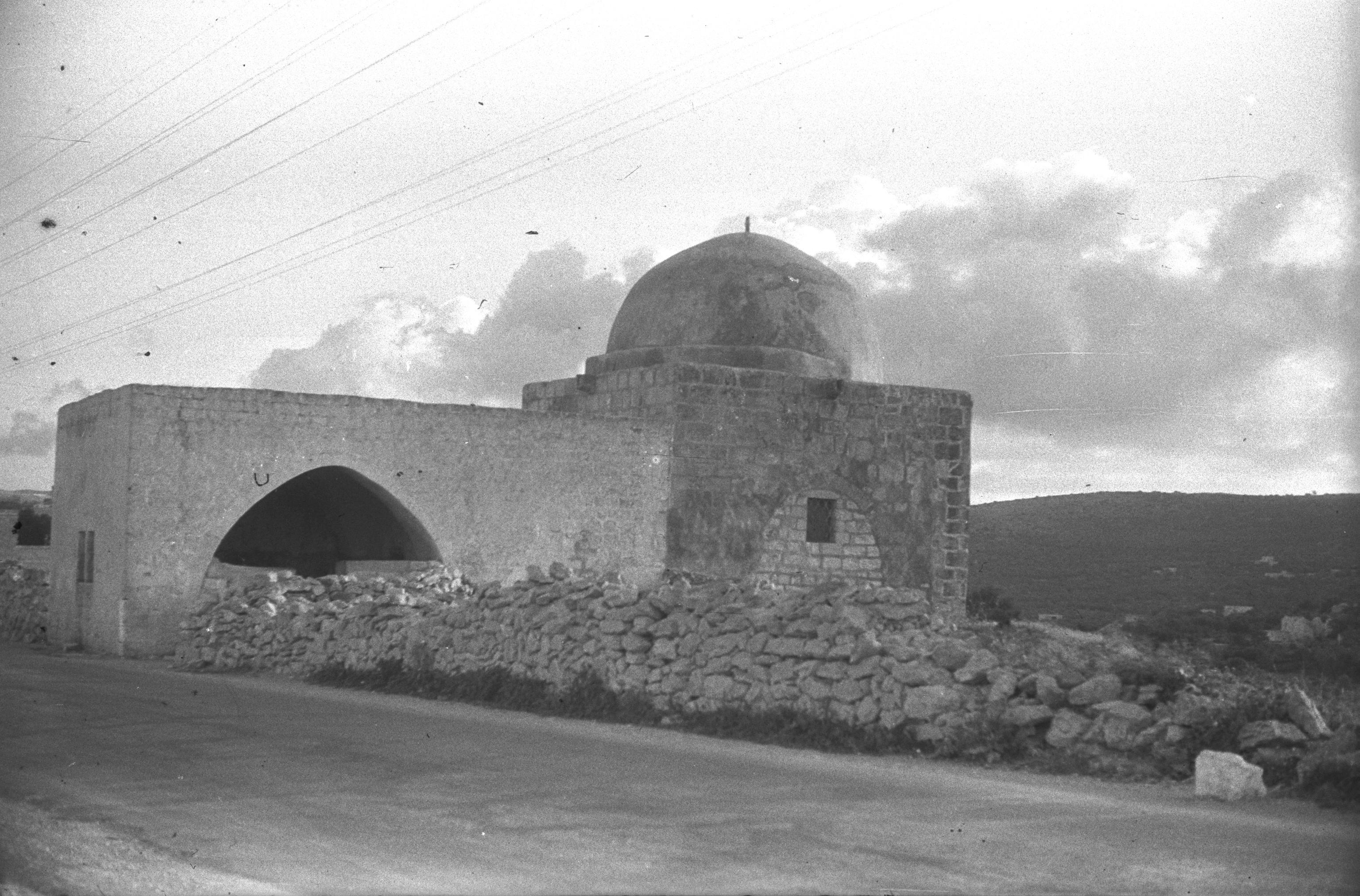
1940

=== West perspective ===
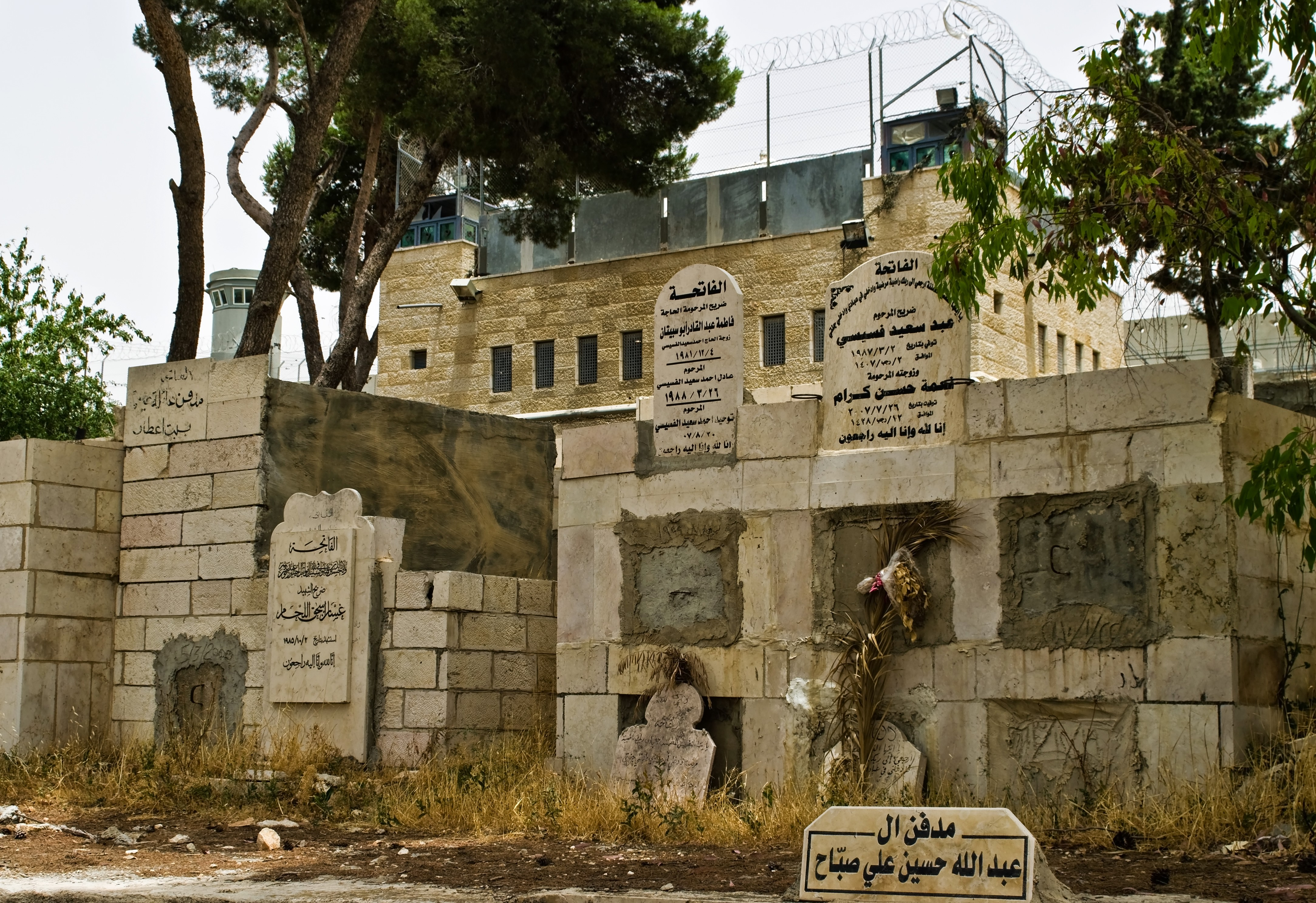
2016

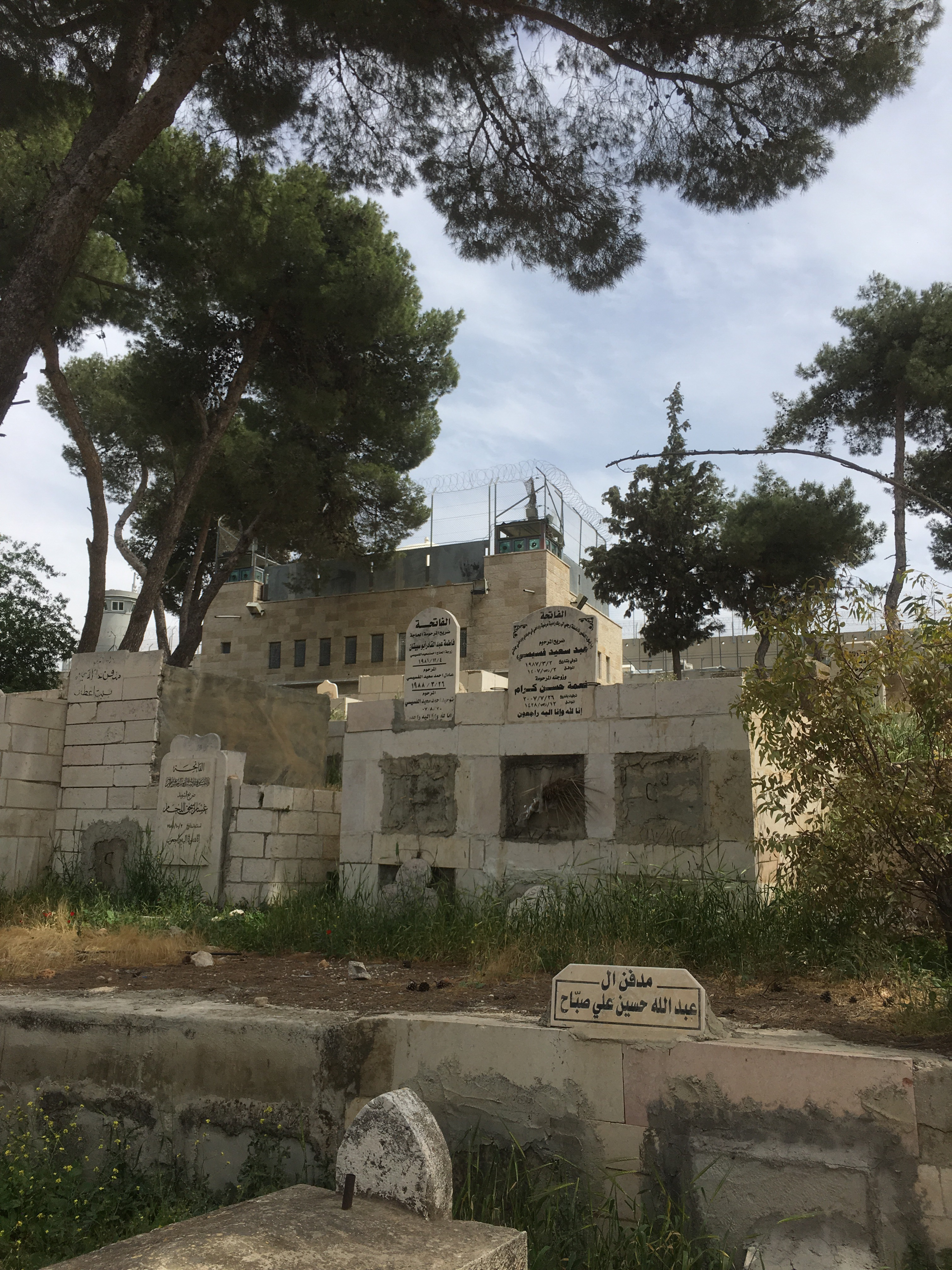
2018

=== East perspective ===
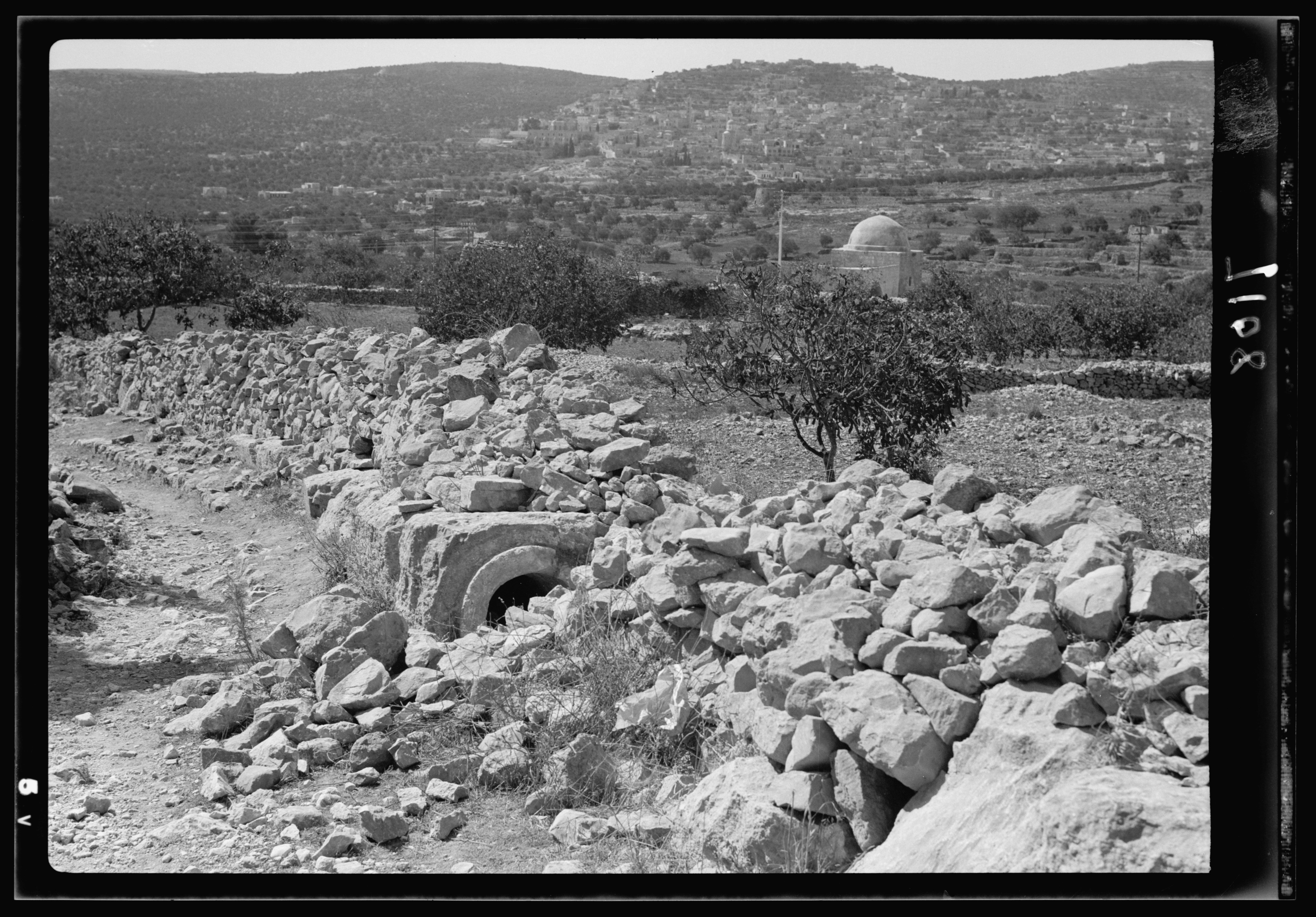
1934–1939

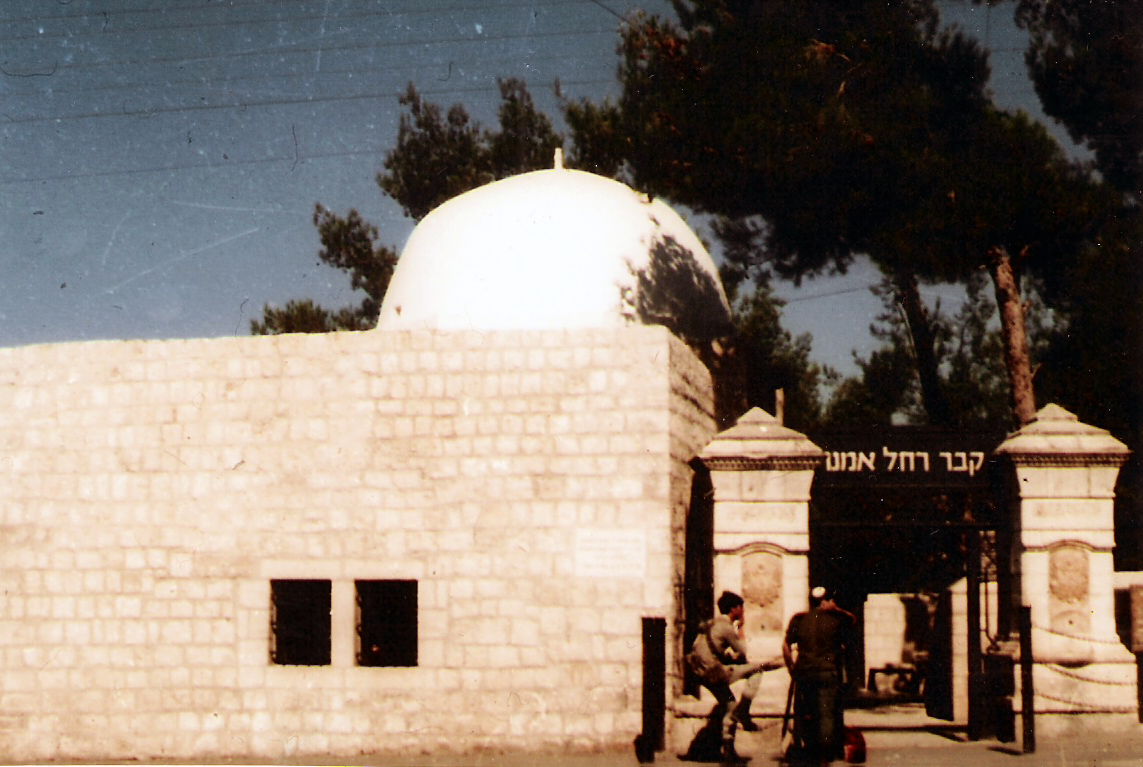
1978
- A 2014 photo from Hebrew Wikipedia:

=== South perspective ===
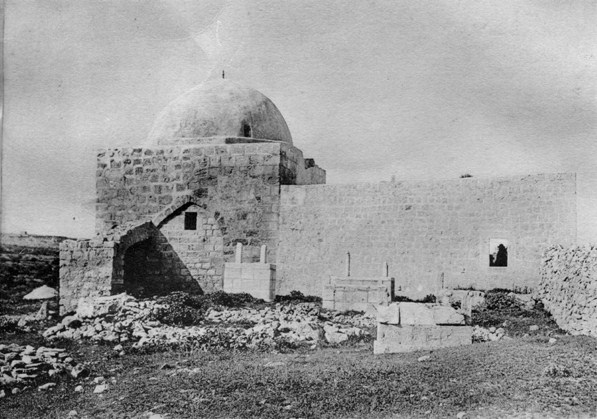
1912

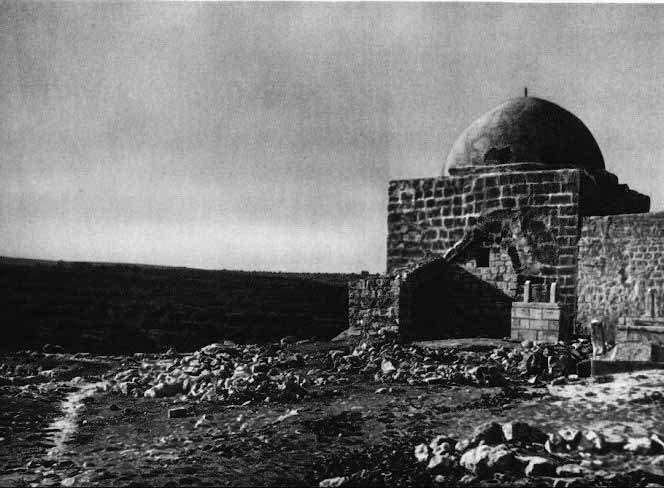
Unknown

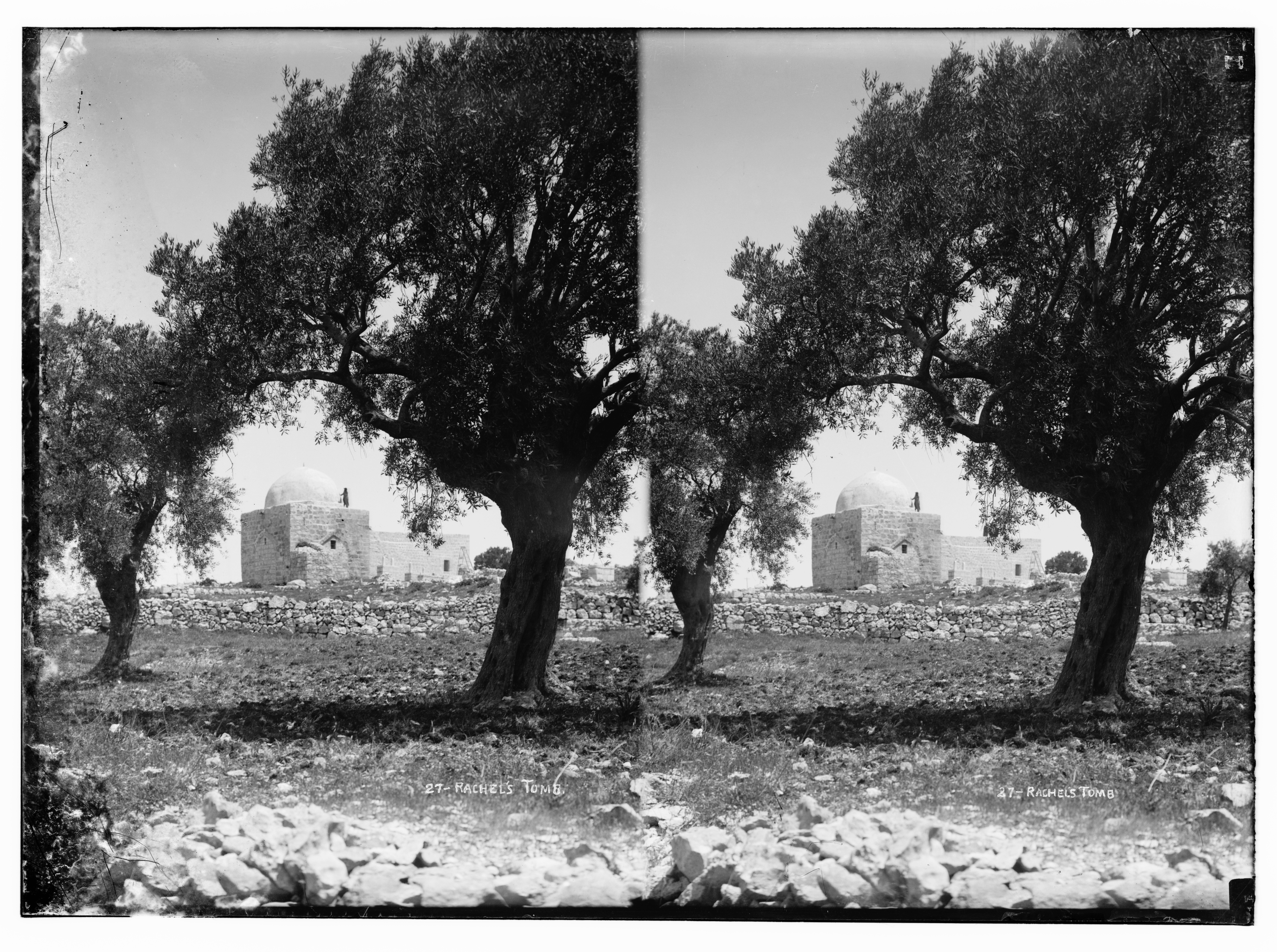
1898–1946

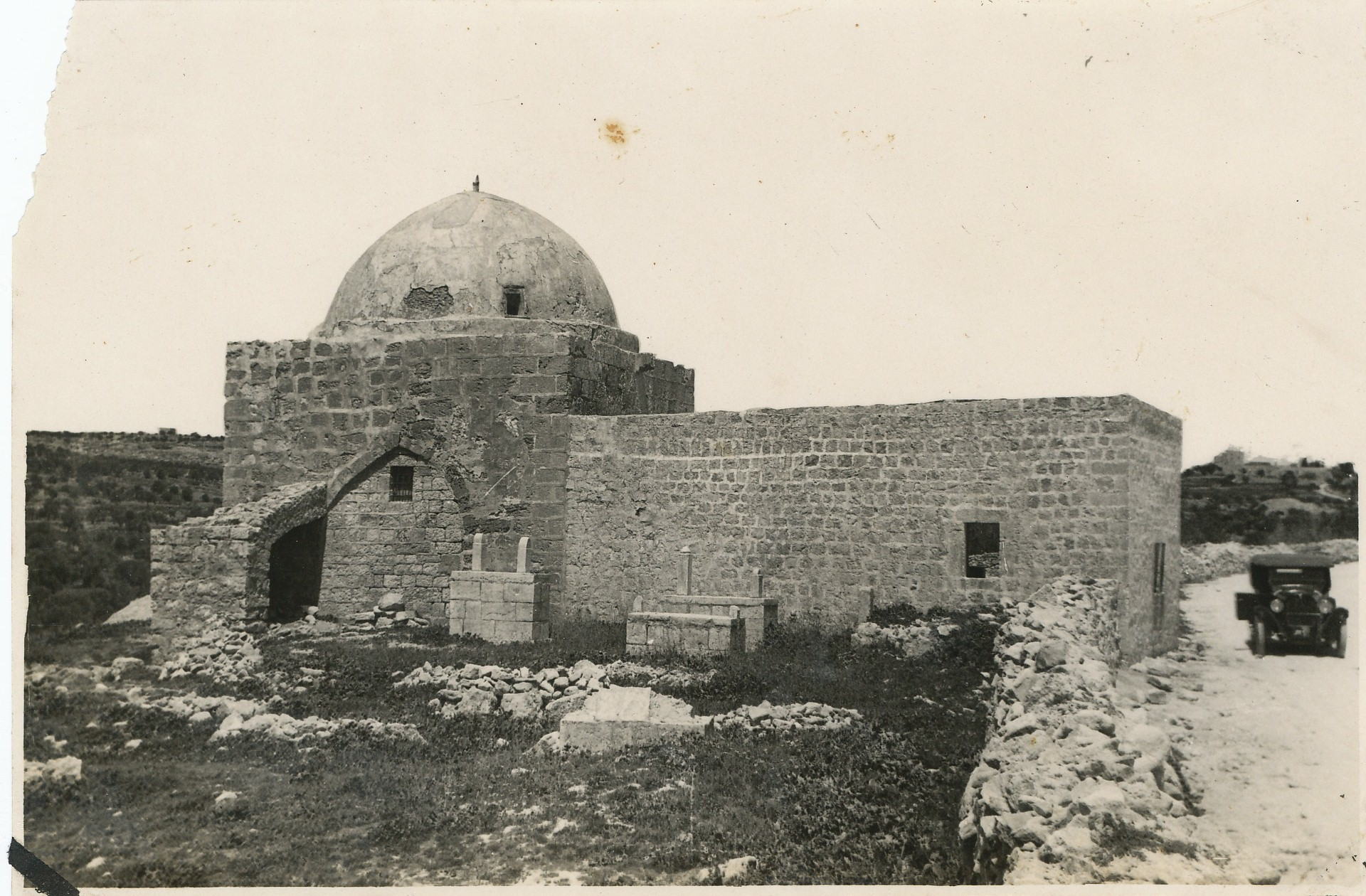
1930s

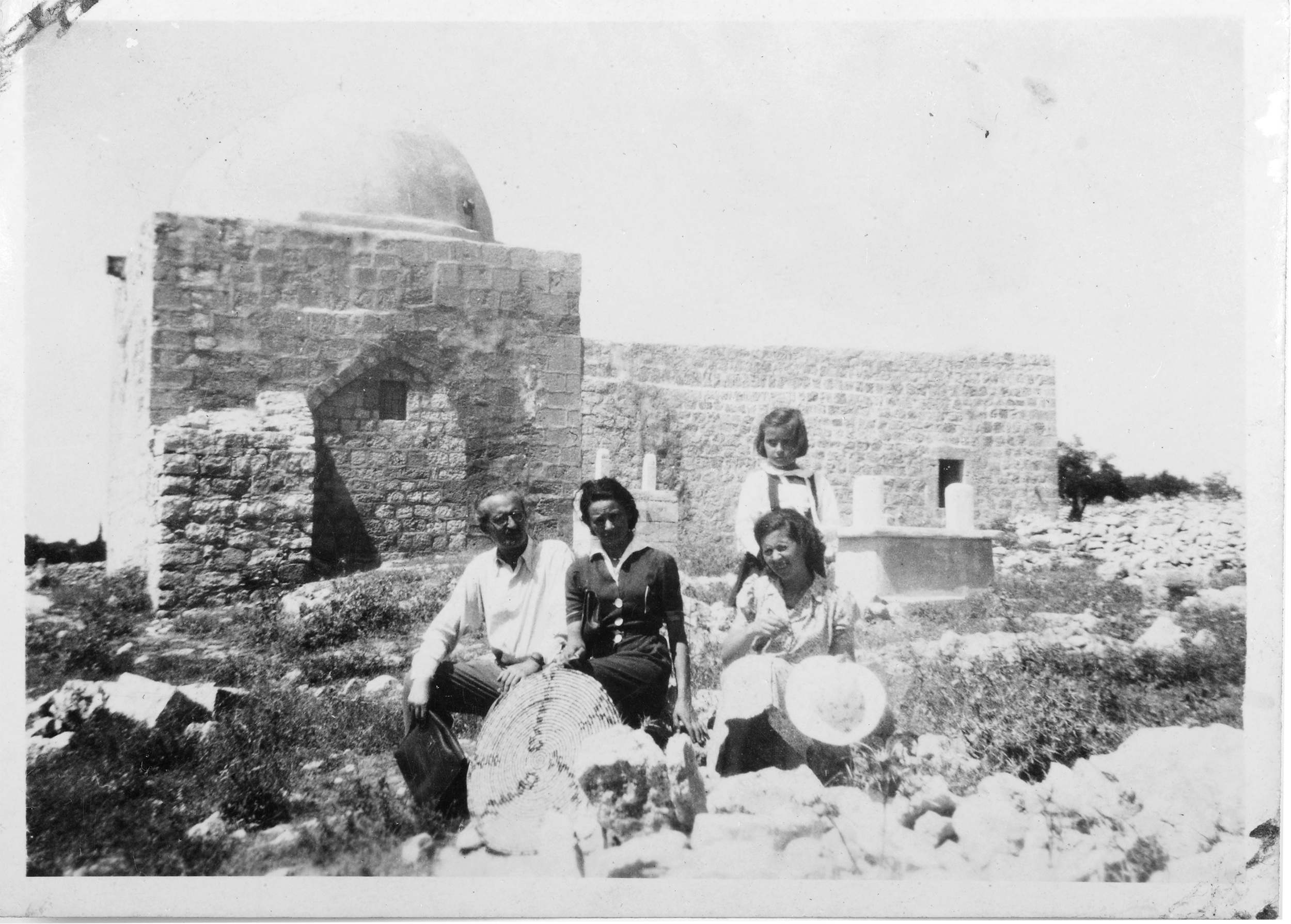
1940s?

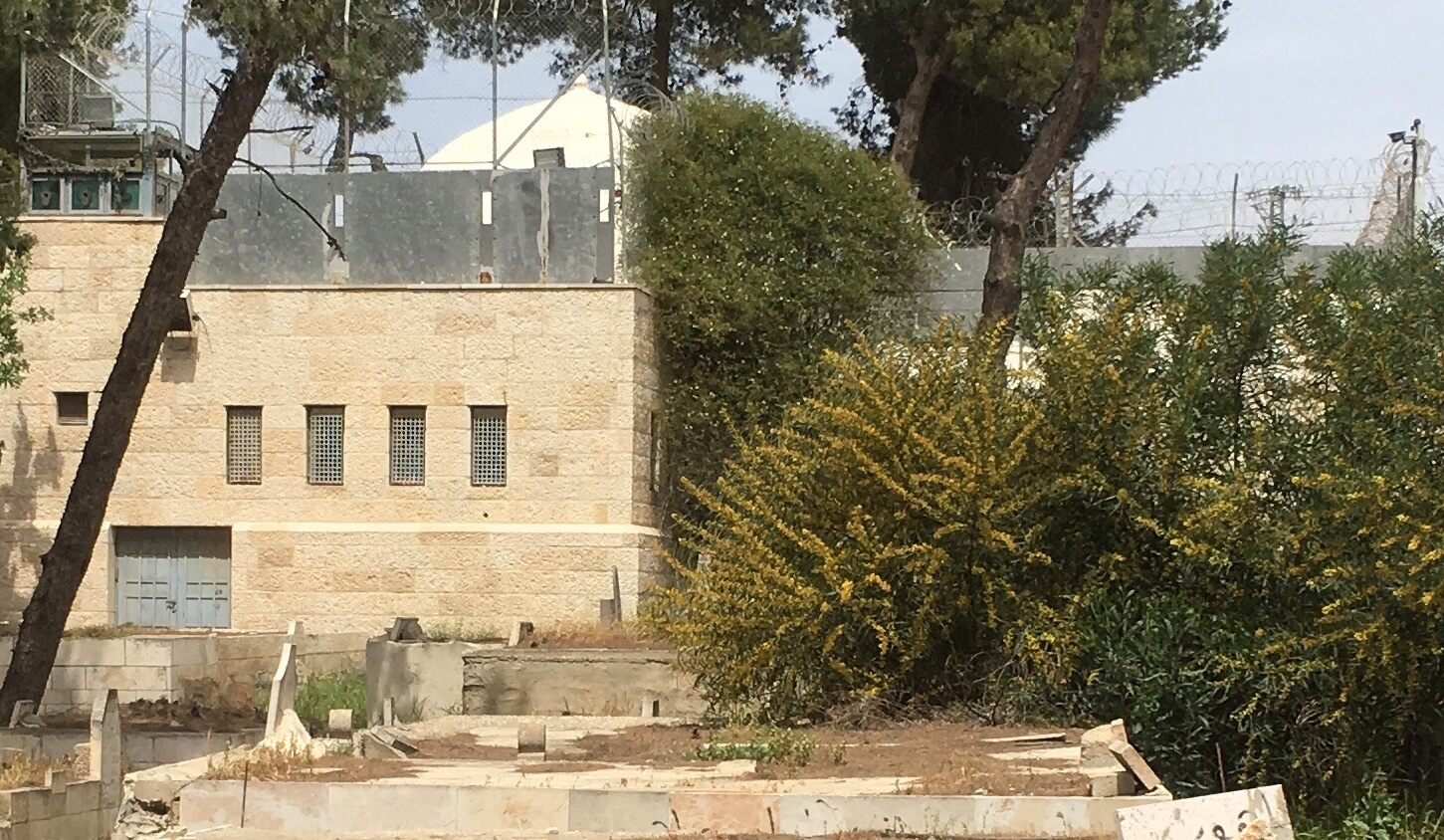
2018

=== South-east perspective ===
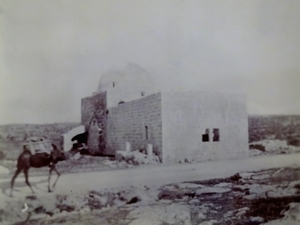
1891

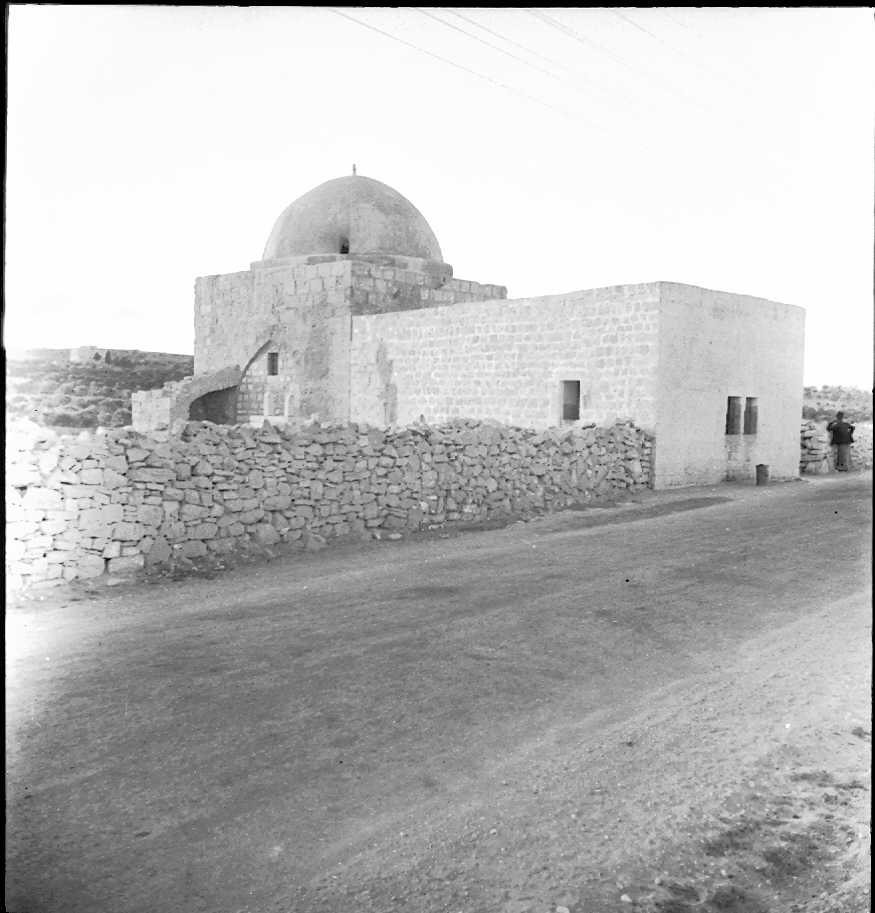
1934

== Bibliography ==
- Bowman, Glenn W. (Spring 2014). "Sharing and Exclusion: The Case of Rachel's Tomb". Jerusalem Quarterly (58): 30–49. doi:10.70190/jq.I58.p30.
- Breger, Marshall J.; Reiter, Yitzhak; Hammer, Leonard (2013). "Introduction: Marshall J. Breger, Yitzhak Reiter and Leonard Hammer". Sacred Space in Israel and Palestine: Religion and Politics. Routledge. ISBN 978-1-136-49034-7.
- Lehrs, Lior (2013). "Political holiness: Negotiating holy places in Eretz Israel/Palestine, 1937–2003". In Breger, Marshall J.; Reiter, Yitzhak; Hammer, Leonard (eds.). Sacred Space in Israel and Palestine: Religion and Politics. Routledge. ISBN 978-1-136-49034-7.
- Chateaubriand, F.-R. (1812). Travels in Greece, Palestine, Egypt, and Barbary, during the years 1806 and 1807. Vol. 1. London: for Henry Colburn.
- Conder, C.R.; Kitchener, H. H. (1883). The Survey of Western Palestine: Memoirs of the Topography, Orography, Hydrography, and Archaeology. Vol. 3. London: Committee of the Palestine Exploration Fund.
- Fabri, F. (1896). Felix Fabri (circa 1480–1483 A.D.) vol I, part II. Palestine Pilgrims' Text Society.
- ed-Dyn, Moudjir (1876). Sauvaire (ed.). Histoire de Jérusalem et d'Hébron depuis Abraham jusqu'à la fin du XVe siècle de J.-C. : fragments de la Chronique de Moudjir-ed-dyn.
- Gitlitz, David M. & Linda Kay Davidson. “Pilgrimage and the Jews’’ (Westport, CT: Praeger, 2006).
- Le Strange, G. (1890). Palestine Under the Moslems: A Description of Syria and the Holy Land from A.D. 650 to 1500. London: Committee of the Palestine Exploration Fund.
- Pococke, R. (1745). A description of the East, and some other countries. Vol. 2. London: Printed for the author, by W. Bowyer.
- Pringle, D. (1998). The Churches of the Crusader Kingdom of Jerusalem: L-Z (excluding Tyre). Vol. II. Cambridge University Press. ISBN 0-521-39037-0.
- Pullan, W. (2013). Bible and Gun: Militarism in Jerusalem's Holy Places. Space and Polity, 17 (3), 335–56, dx.doi.org/10.1080/13562576.2013.853490
- Selwyn, T. (2009) Ghettoizing a matriarch and a city: An everyday story from the Palestinian/Israeli borderlands, Journal of Borderlands Studies, 24(3), pp. 39– 55
- Sharon, M. (1999). Corpus Inscriptionum Arabicarum Palaestinae, B-C. Vol. 2. Brill. ISBN 978-90-04-11083-0.(p. 177, ff)
- Strickert, Frederick M. (2007). Rachel weeping: Jews, Christians, and Muslims at the Fortress Tomb. Liturgical Press. ISBN 978-0-8146-5987-8.
- UNESCO (19 March 2010), 184 EX/37, The Two Palestinian Sites of Al-Haram Al-Ibrahimi/Tomb of the Patriarchs in Al-Khalil/Hebron and the Bilal bin Rabah Mosques/Rachael's Tomb in Bethlehem, Fact Sheet on Israeli Consolidation of Palestinian Heritage Sites in the Occupied Palestinian Territory: The Case if Hebron and Bethlehem
- Zuallart, J. [in French] (1587). Il devotissimo viaggio di Gervsalemme. Roma.
