= Palestinian Bedouin =

Minority within Palestinian society

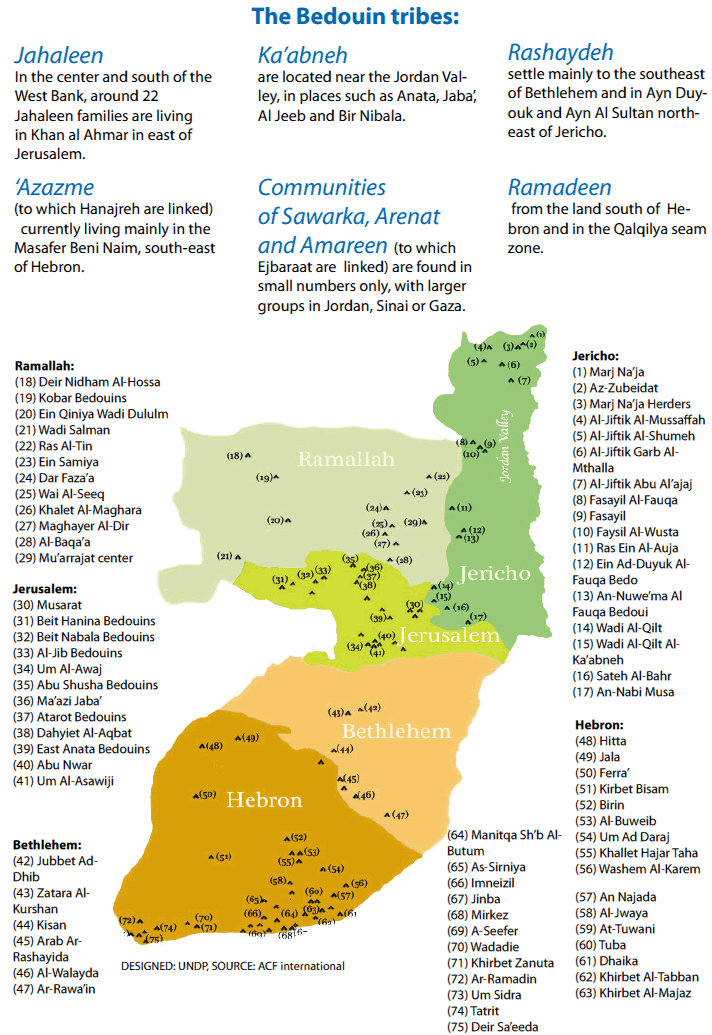
Bedouin tribes in the West Bank

Palestinian Bedouin (Note: Arabic: بدو فلسطين) (the plural form of Bedouin can be Bedouin or Bedouins) are a nomadic people who have come to form an organic part of the Palestinian people, characterized by a semi-pastoral and agricultural lifestyle. Originating from the Bi’r as-Saba’/Beersheba region in Southern Historical Palestine, Palestinian Bedouin are now predominantly concentrated in the South (al-Naqab/Negev and Gaza Bedouin), the North (al-Jalil/Galilee Bedouin) and in the West Bank. Bedouins have lived in the Negev region, stretching from Gaza to the Dead Sea, since at least the fifth century. Remnants of Bedouin communities in the Gaza Strip include 5,000 individuals in Om al-Nasr and as of late 2022, the number of nomadic Bedouin in the Gaza Strip was shrinking and many were or are settled.

== Population ==
In 2005, Bedouin were estimated to amount to 10% of the Arab population in Israel.

As of 2013, approximately 40,000 Bedouin reside in the West Bank, split among the Jahalin, Ka’abneh, Rashaydeh, Ramadin, ‘Azazme, Communities of Sawarka, Arenat and Amareen.

== Overview ==
A Bedouin family near the gate of kibbutz Urim, 1946

Bedouins' forced transfer over time

Following the creation of the State of Israel in 1948 and the 1948 Palestine war, most Palestinian Bedouin fled or were expelled to neighboring countries. Only 13,000 out of 95,000 Bedouin remained in the Negev region. They were confined in a militarized zone northeast of Bi'r as-Saba' until 1967 and separated from both Jewish and other Palestinian communities. Today more than 200,000 Bedouin live in the Negev region. They reside in government-planned towns, as well as in villages that the state categorizes as 'unrecognized'. There are 37 unrecognized Bedouin villages and 11 other villages that only are partially recognized or in the process of being recognized by the Israeli government. The unrecognized villages accommodate a significant component of the community. The seven government-planned towns were established from the late 1960s onwards in an attempt to urbanize the Palestinian Bedouin, but most of them resisted relocation, fearing that they would lose their historical villages and land claims. The urbanization process in the Naqab has severely diminished Palestinian Bedouin pastoral and agricultural land use, and endangered their traditional culture.

== Land struggle ==
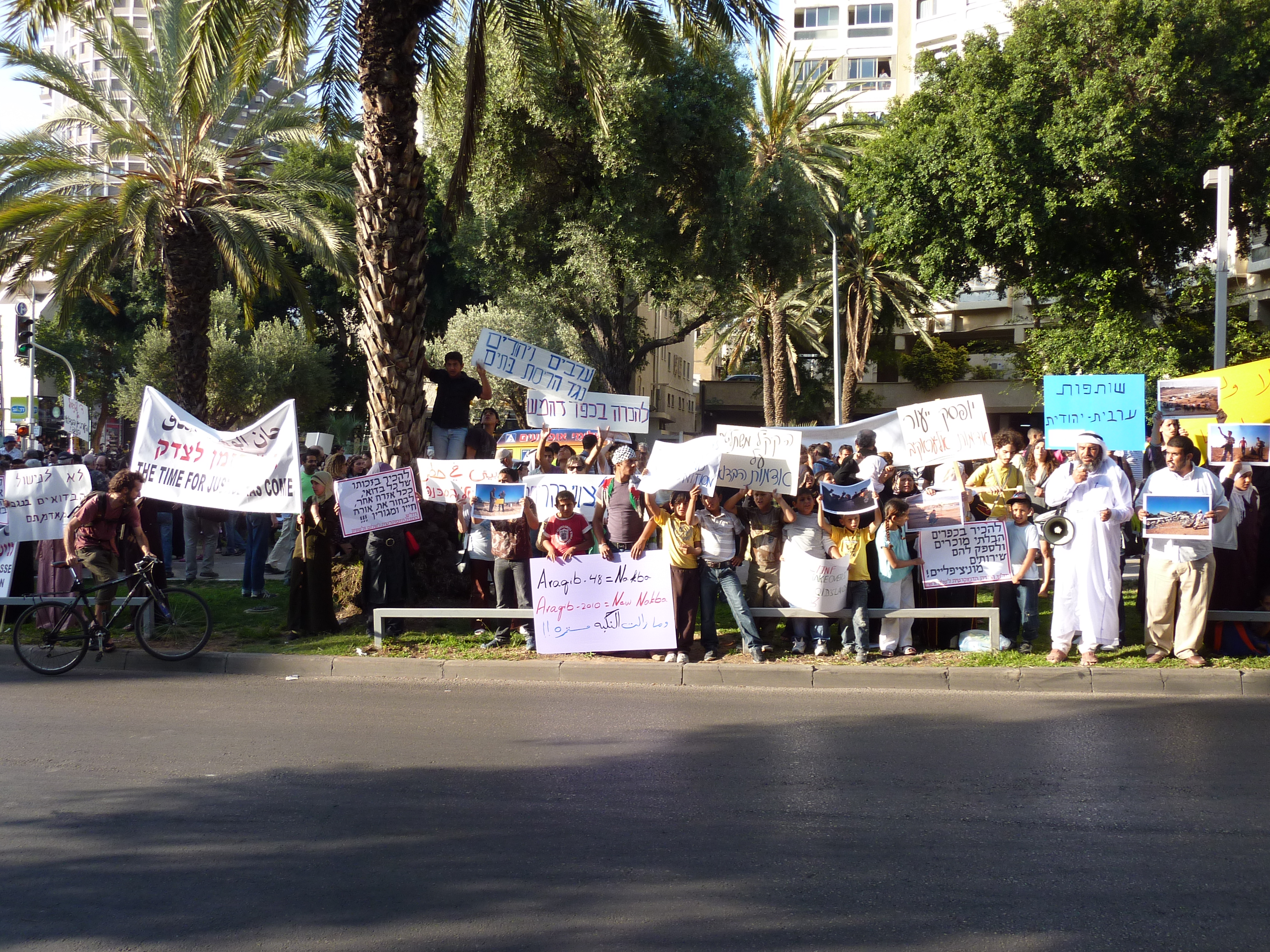
Bedouins demonstrating in Tel Aviv for the right to return to their village of Al-Araqib, 12 May 2010

Palestinian Bedouins have clear notions of land ownership, and have historically entertained semi-pastoral and agricultural lifestyles. Traditional Orientalist scholarship portrayed them as landless desert nomads socially and culturally distinct from the rest of the Palestinian population.

The Israeli government has formed a number of committees to address the dispute over land ownership in the Naqab, the latest being the Prawer Committee formed in 2011. It was headed by Ehud Prawer, Chief of the Policy Planning Department within the Prime Minister’s Office and former deputy head of the National Security Council, and did not include any Bedouin representatives. The Prawer Plan, also called Bill on the Arrangement of Bedouin Settlement in the Negev, was marketed by the government as a plan to improve significantly the lives of the Palestinian Bedouin, but sparked widespread Bedouin resistance. Although purportedly based on the recommendation issued by the Goldberg Commission in 2007, which had recognized the Bedouin’s historical connection to the land and proposed that half of their land claims be granted, the Prawer Plan offered settlement of less than 27 percent of the claims and did not mention any unrecognized villages. (Note: For more details about the Goldberg Committee, see Abu-Ras, Thabet (2011) “The Arab Bedouin in the Unrecognized Villages in the Naqab (Negev): Between the Hammer of Prawer and the Anvil of Goldberg”. Adalah's Newsletter 81 (1) and Habitat International Coalition (2010) “The International Fact Findings Mission, 13. The Goldberg Opportunity: A chance for the Human Rights based statecraft in Israel".)

In 2013 the Prawer Plan was further modified when the Law for the Regulation of Bedouin Settlement in the Negev, or the Prawer-Begin Bill, was approved. Intensive housing demolition followed, which the Israeli government states is due to illegal construction. However, a further 40,000 Bedouin continue to be threatened with expulsion from and demolition of their villages. The Palestinian Bedouin community met this with strong resistance, led by the Regional Council of Unrecognized Villages (RCUV) and other local organizations. Bedouin female and male youth also were key actors in resisting the Prawer Plan. Coalescing in a strong youth movement (al-hirak al-shababi), they used social media tactics and other nonviolent popular forms of resistance, such as protests and demonstrations. Together, these local resistance struggles led to the withdrawal and freezing of the Prawer Plan.

The Palestinian Bedouin resistance movement against forced displacement, house demolitions and land annexation as envisaged by the Prawer Plan has received strong international attention and support. As a result the Palestinian Bedouin are increasingly recognized as an indigenous people of the land, and as an integral part of the Palestinian community.

== West Bank Bedouin ==
The basic units of the West Bank Bedouin are as follows:

Tribe	Habitat
Jahalin	Center and south West Bank
'Azazme	Masafer Beni Naim, south-east of Hebron.
Ka'abneh	Jordan Valley, around Anata, Jaba', Al Jeeb and Bir Nibala.
Sawarka	dispersed
Arenat	dispersed
Amarin	dispersed
Rashaydeh	SE of Bethlehem; Ayn Duy-ouk (see Ein ad-Duyuk al-Foqa/Ein ad-Duyuk at-Tahta) and Ayn Al Sultan, NE of Jericho.
Ramadin	South of Hebron; the Qalqilya seam zone.

Within the Jordan Valley, many Bedouin communities are located within 30% of Area C, which Israel now classifies as military firing zones and where nearly 6,200 Bedouin live. Numerous villages have been demolished by the IDF, some repeatedly, and rebuilt by the affected Bedouin. Between November 2020 and July 2021, one community, in Humsa al-Baqai’a located in Area C had their hamlet. consisting of 83 structures, including water tanks and solar panels and other infrastructure provided by the European Union, destroyed seven times. The November 2020 demolition displaced 73 Palestinians, among them 41 children, and was the largest demolition carried out in years, according to the United Nations.

=== Ta'amireh ===
There is a cluster of villages and towns near Bethlehem settled by the Ta'amireh tribe, also known as the 'Arab al-Ta'amireh, variously spelled as Ta'amira(h), Ta'amreh, Ta'amra, etc. (see the towns and villages of Za'atara, Beit Ta'mir, Hindaza, Tuqu' with Khirbet al-Deir, Nuaman, Ubeidiya, Al-Masara and al-Asakra). The first Dead Sea Scrolls from Qumran were discovered by members of the tribe, who afterwards successfully searched the Judaean desert for caves holding more such ancient relics (see Cave of Letters from Nahal Hever, Wadi Murabba'at and Wadi Daliyeh). They have participated in the 1834 so-called Peasant's revolt.

== See also ==
- Israeli Bedouin
- Hanajira, major tribe, largely sedentary by the 1940s
- Tarabin Bedouin, major tribe, in part living in the Negev

== Sources ==
- Abu Sitta, Salman (11 July 2009). "The Denied Inheritance: Palestinian Land Ownership in Beer Sheba". Paper Presented to the International Fact Finding Mission. Regional Council of Unrecognised Villages.
- Abu-Ras, Thabet (2011). "The Arab Bedouin in the Unrecognized Villages in the Naqab (Negev): Between the Hammer of Prawer and the Anvil of Goldberg" (PDF). Adalah's Newsletter. 81 (1).
- Abu-Sa‘ad, Ismael (2005). "Forced Sedentarisation, Land Rights and Indigenous Resistance: The Bedouin in the Negev". In Masalha, Nur (ed.). Catastrophe Remembered: Palestine, Israel and the Internal Refugees. Zed Books. pp. 113–141. ISBN 978-1-842-77622-3 – via ResearchGate.
- Abu-Sa‘ad, Ismael; Creamer, Cosette (2012). "Socio-Political Upheaval and Current Conditions of the Naqab Bedouin Arabs". In Amara, Ahmad; Abu-Sa‘ad, Ismael; Yiftachel, Oren (eds.). Indigenous (In)Justice: Human Rights Law and Bedouin Arabs in the Naqab/Negev. Harvard University Press. pp. 18–66. ISBN 978-0-986-10622-4.
- Adalah (2013). "The Prawer-Begin Bill and the Forced Displacement of the Bedouin" (PDF).
- Amara, Ahmad (Summer 2013). "The Negev Land Question: Between Denial and Recognition". Journal of Palestine Studies. 42 (4): 27–47. doi:10.1525/jps.2013.42.4.27. JSTOR 10.1525/jps.2013.42.4.27.
- "Bedouins in the occupied Palestinian territory" (PDF). United Nations Development Programme. September 2013. Archived from the original (PDF) on 25 July 2021.
- Dinero, Steven C. (2010). Settling for Less: The Planned Resettlement of Israel's Negev Bedouin. Berghahn Books. ISBN 978-1-845-45982-6.
- Falah, Ghazi (1989). "Israeli State Policy toward Bedouin Sedentarization in the Negev". Journal of Palestine Studies. 18 (2): 71–91. doi:10.2307/2537634. JSTOR 2537634.
- Frantzman, Seth J.; Yahel, Havatzelet; Kark, Ruth (Spring 2012). "Contested Indigeneity: The Development of an Indigenous Discourse on the Bedouin of the Negev, Israel". Israel Studies. 17 (1): 78–104. doi:10.2979/israelstudies.17.1.78. JSTOR 10.2979/israelstudies.17.1.78. S2CID 143785060.
- Heneiti, Ahmad (Spring 2016). "Bedouin Communities in Greater Jerusalem: Planning or Forced Displacement?". Jerusalem Quarterly. 65: 51–85.
- "Israeli army razes entire village in occupied West Bank". Al Jazeera. 4 November 2020.
- Khawalde, Sliman; Rabinowitz, Dan (Summer 2002). "Race from the Bottom of the Tribe That Never Was: Segmentary Narratives Amongst the Ghawarna of Galilee". Journal of Anthropological Research. 58 (2): 225–243. doi:10.1086/jar.58.2.3631037. JSTOR 3631037. S2CID 147537658.
- Marx, Emanuel (1967). Bedouin of the Negev. Manchester University Press.
- Nasasra, Mansour (2017). The Naqab Bedouins: A Century of Politics and Resistance. Columbia University Press. ISBN 978-0-231-54387-3.
- Nasasra, Mansour; Bellis, Emily (2020). "The Role of Bedouin Youth and Women in Resistance to the Israeli Prawer Plans in the Naqab". Middle East Critique. 29 (4): 395–419. doi:10.1080/19436149.2020.1826715. S2CID 227059982.
- Nasasra, Mansour; Richter-Devroe, Sophie; Abu-Rabia-Queder, Sarab; Ratcliffe, Richard, eds. (2014). The Naqab Bedouin and Colonialism: New Perspectives. Routledge. ISBN 978-1-317-66051-4.
- "Palestinian community in West Bank demolished for seventh time". Al Jazeera. 7 July 2021.
- Pappe, Ilan (2018). "Indigeneity as Cultural Resistance: Notes on the Palestinian Struggle within Twenty-First-Century Israel ". South Atlantic Quarterly. 117 (1): 157–178. doi:10.1215/00382876-4282082. hdl:10871/28176.
- Richter-Devroe, Sophie (2016). "Oral Traditions of Naqab Bedouin Women: Challenging Settler-Colonial Representations through Embodied Performance". Journal of Holy Land and Palestine Studies. 15 (1): 31–57. doi:10.3366/hlps.2016.0128.
- Sawafta, Ali (5 November 2020). "Israel razes most of Palestinian Bedouin village in West Bank on U.S. election day". Reuters.
- Yiftachel, Oren; Roded, Batya; Kedar, Alexandre (2016). "Between rights and denials: Bedouin indigeneity in the Negev/Naqab". Environment and Planning A: Economy and Space. 48 (11): 2129–2161. doi:10.1177/0308518X16653404. S2CID 147970455 – via ResearchGate.
