= Ta'amireh =

Large Palestinian Bedouin tribe

Ta'amireh, also known as the Ta'amrah, Ta'amirah or 'Arab al-Ta'amira (in Arabic: التعامرة), is a large Palestinian Bedouin tribe. The Ta‘amireh tribe is named after Beit Ta'mir, which is located in the Bethlehem Governorate. The tribe's historic heartland remains in the Palestinian Authority territories south and east of Bethlehem, where members have established a permanent settlement cluster known as 'Arab et-Ta'amireh village cluster (consisting of Za'atara, Beit Ta'mir, Hindaza, Tuqu' with Khirbet al-Deir, Nuaman, Ubeidiya, Al-Masara, Kisan, Jannatah, and al-Asakra). Following the 1967 Arab–Israeli War, a significant Palestinian diaspora population from the tribe also established itself in the Kingdom of Jordan in the late 1960s. Additionally, a small number of members migrated to South America in the early 20th century, influenced by Christians from Bethlehem.

== Names ==
=== Etymology ===
The word Ta'amireh is a collective name, while its singular form is Ta'mari, referring to a person originating from Beit Ta'mir. Similarly, a person from Bethlehem is called a Talhami, from Beit Jala a Bajjali, and from Beit Sahour a Sahouri. Beit Ta'mir is an ancient ruin said to have been named after Umar ibn al-Khattab, who is believed to have passed through the site during the Muslim conquest of Jerusalem. It is possible that he spent the night or prayed there. There is also a Mosque of Umar ibn al-Khattab in Beit Ta'mir. The Taʿamireh are also referred to as ʿArab al-Taʿāmira. The term 'ʿArab' in this context denotes their identity as a Bedouin tribal group. This designation appears in Ottoman sources of the 16th and 17th centuries. (Note: Examples are given in the history section.)

=== Place names ===
There is a valley on the western side of the Dead Sea in the Judean desert on the way to the Qumran caves named Wadi Ta'amireh that was documented in the 19th century surveys of the region by the Palestine Exploration Fund.

In book published by the Society for Promoting Christian Knowledge, Catholic theologian Mary C. Grey speculated on a connection between the name of the tribe and the word tamar, used in the Hebrew Bible for a place on the Dead Sea (for Hazazon-tamar see Ein Gedi), as well as with the name of Tamar, one of the ancestors of King David, as outlined in the Book of Genesis.

== Origins and way of life ==
The Ta'amireh is a Palestinian Arab tribe originating from the wilderness stretching from the western Dead Sea shores to Bethlehem and Tekoah. The Ta'amireh were considered a Bedouin tribe, that is, nomadic Arabs. Although predominantly nomadic, living in tents, the tribe maintained one small village, Beit Ta'mir, which was primarily used for storing crops and rarely inhabited, as claimed by western travelers during the 19th century. Nomadic pastoralism was a mode of living common to the bedouin tribes of this region for millennia. Some western visitors to Palestine from the 1920s have claimed the Ta'amireh have a partial fellahin origin, based on their observations that they practiced cultivation and lived a semi nomadic rather than nomadic way of life. Sedentarization of the tribe began in the 1920s and was largely completed by the 1970s.

Historically, the traditional tents of the Ta'amireh were long, black "houses of hair" woven from goats' hair, featuring low, sloping roofs and open fronts. These tents typically averaged 20 to 25 feet in length, though smaller ones could be 10 feet and larger ones up to 40 feet. Because the scantiness of pasture and water in the Judean Wilderness obliged them to divide, the tribe scattered into numerous small, separate encampments across their territory. larger groups of up to 30 tents (housing around 100 people) would gather around the tent of the tribal Sheikh. One notable mid-19th-century observation recorded a large encampment of 28 tents under Sheikh Abel el Kader al-Ta'mari in Wady Hasásah.

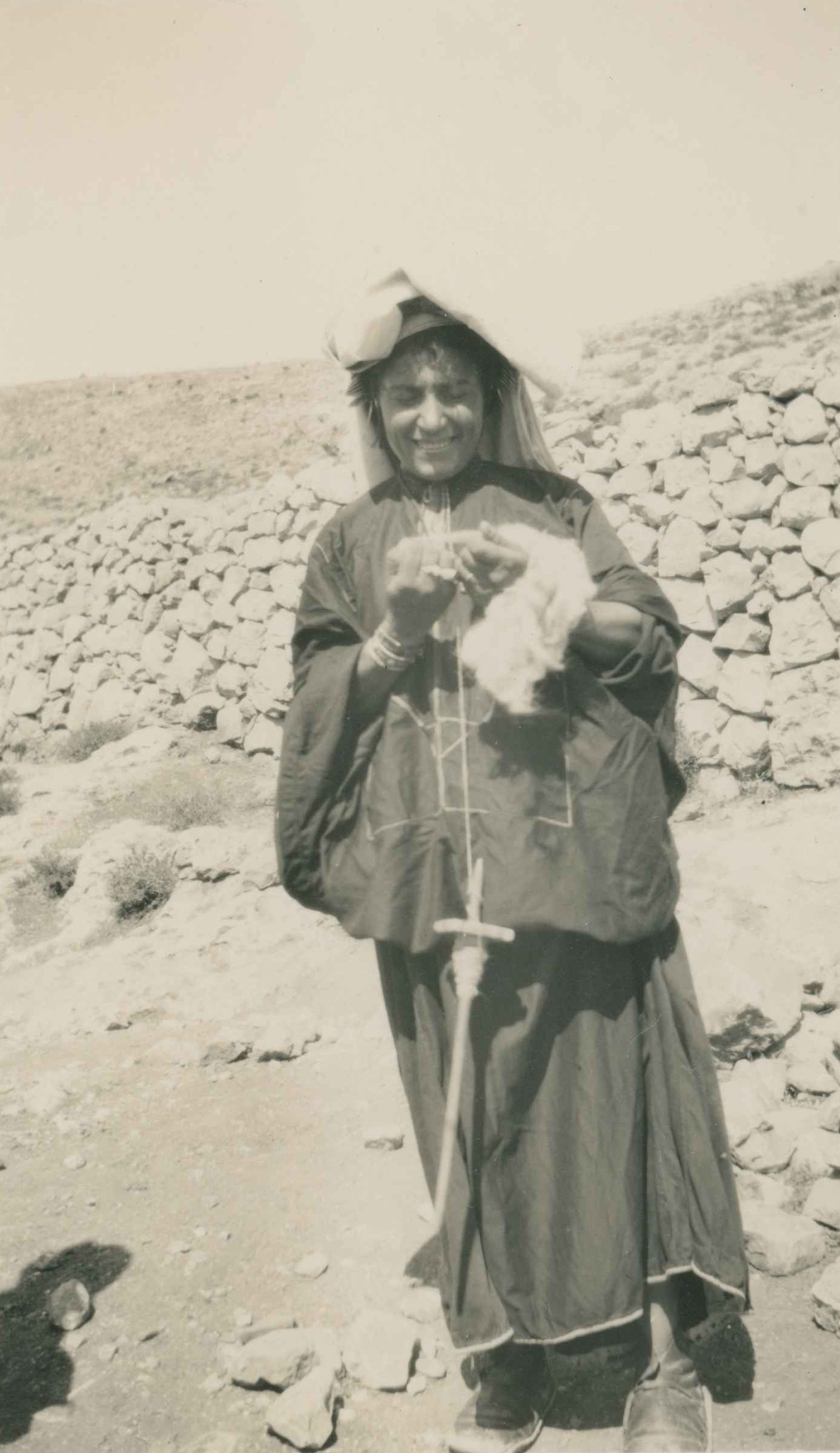
Ta'amireh Bedouin woman spinning wool in the mountains above Artas, Palestine (1925–1931)

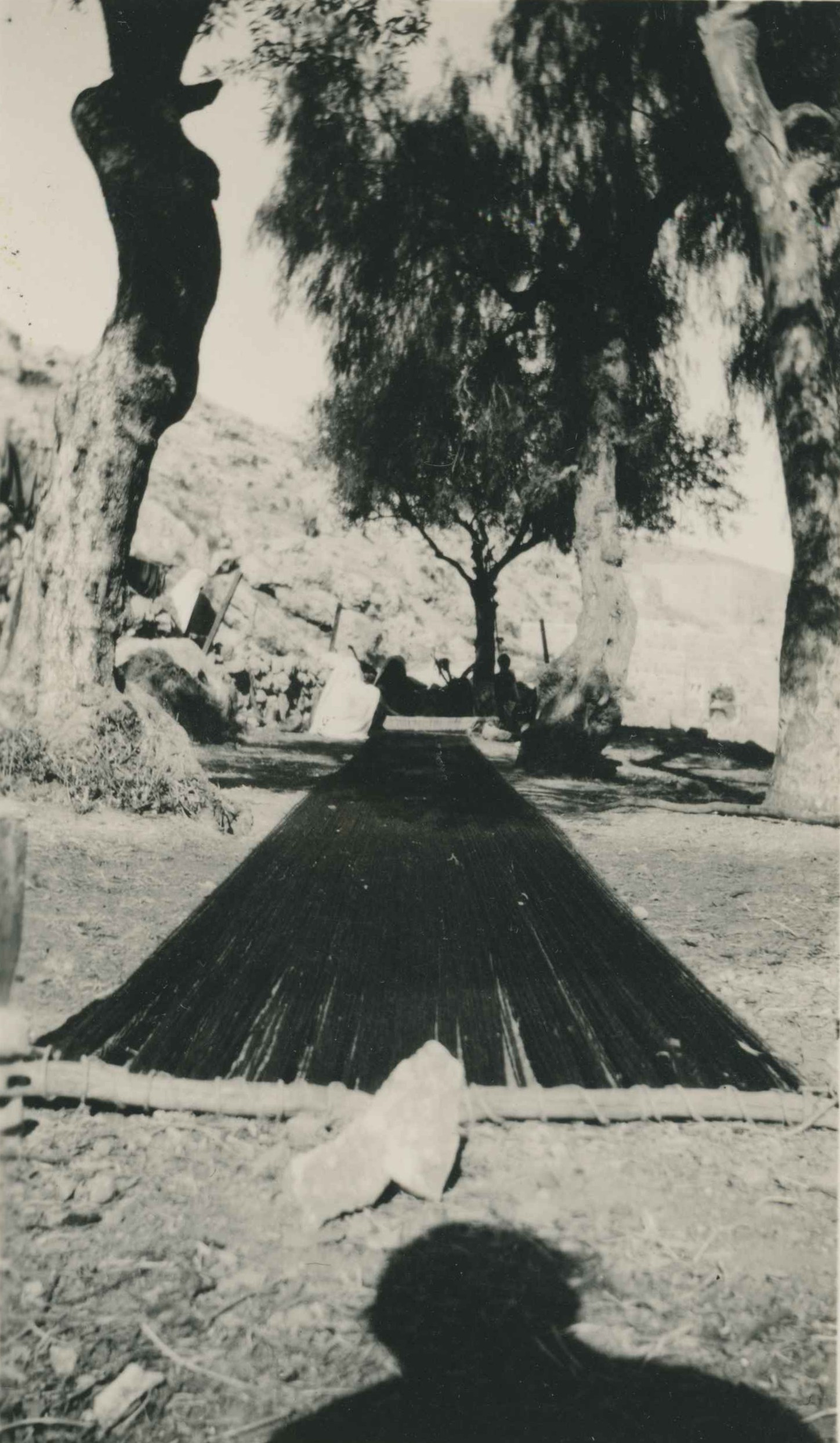
A traditional Ta'amireh Bedouin ground loom stretched between trees to weave goat-hair tent fabric (beit ash-sha'ar) near Artas, Palestine (1925–1931)

To protect themselves and avoid drawing attention, the Ta'amireh deliberately avoided setting up camps in highly visible, open areas. They also pitched their camps at a distance from their watering places, which consisted of springs, standing rainwater pools, and cisterns roughly cut into the rock in the valley bottoms. The Ta'amireh arranged their tents in a rectangular formation, maintaining a distance of about four feet between each tent. On other occasions, they arranged their tents in a triangle to create a secure inner enclosure where their flocks could be driven at night for protection against robbers.

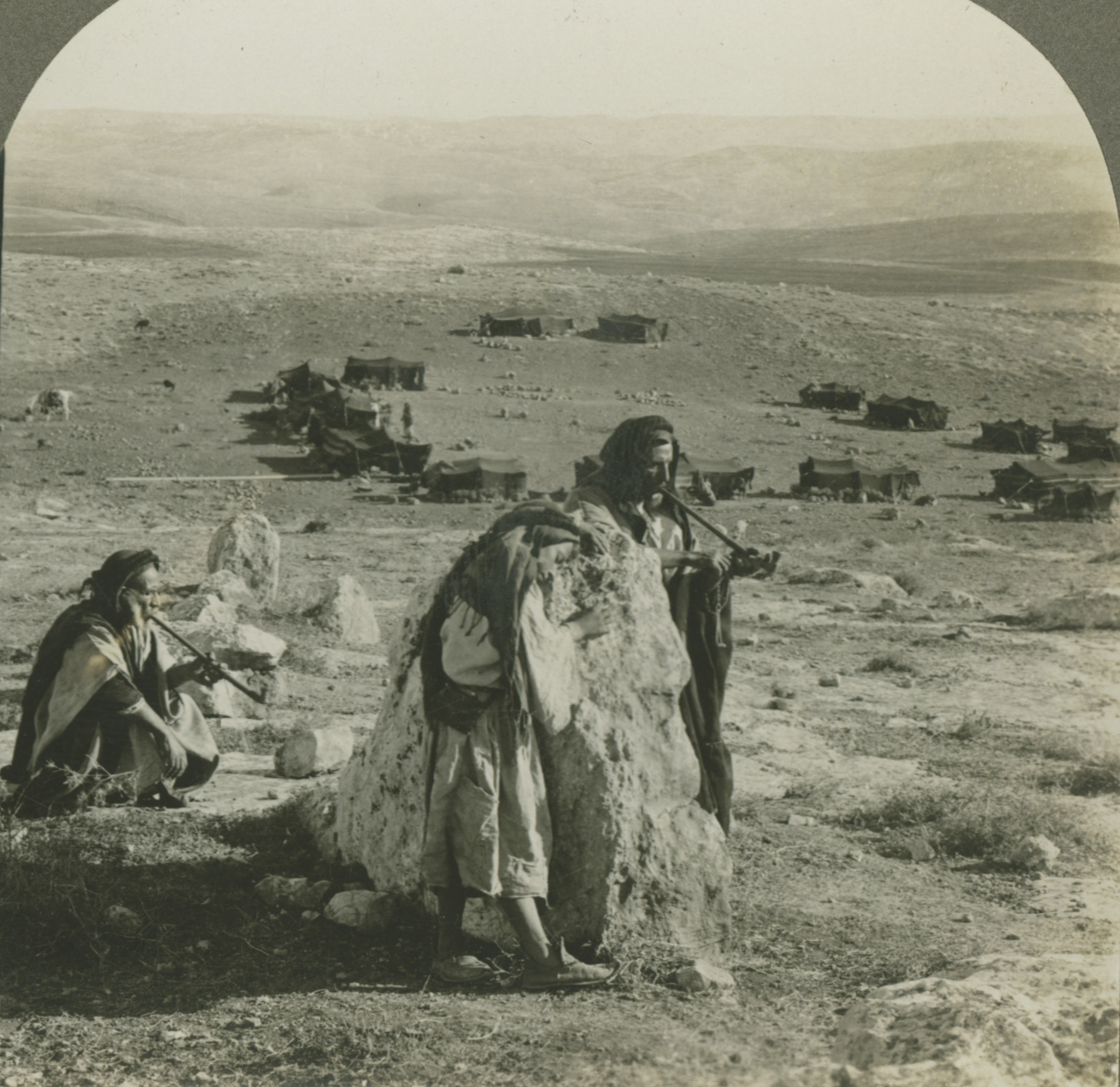
Ta'amireh Bedouin encampment in the Wilderness of Tekoa, Palestine (circa 1914)

When tents were unavailable or extra shelter was required, the tribe adapted the natural landscape and historic ruins of the wilderness:

- Natural Caves: Families frequently utilized natural caves in the regional wadis (such as those near the Mar Saba monastery), which provided excellent shelter and protection.
- Ruins of Tuqu' (Tekoa): By the 19th century, the ancient site of Tuqu' lay in ruins and functioned as a cave settlement for the Ta'amireh, a practice that existed simultaneously alongside tent dwelling in the surrounding nomadic district.
- Beit Ta'mir: Their primary village, Beit Ta'mir, was described by travelers as a collection of ruined houses built from local stone. While mainly utilized as subterranean storage magazines for grain, it also housed a few families of the Ta'amirah who were too poor to possess the luxury of a tent.

Up to the mid-19th century, the Ta'amireh shunned mass literacy prizing a largely oral tradition, a position described by MacDonald as "a positive choice of non-literacy". Generally, only the leading sheikh, would be literate and serve as both katib (scribe or secretary) and imam, and handle all matters requiring paperwork or the reading of texts. This began to change in the latter half of the 19th century.

Socioeconomically, the traditional mode of living for the Ta'amireh was deeply tied to their geographic control over the Judean Wilderness. They dominated the transit corridors stretching from the Hebron and Jerusalem hills down to the western shores of the Dead Sea, as well as the routes leading to the western side of the Jordan River. Nineteenth-century observers described them as the "lords of the soil" in this region. Operating in a rugged environment with weak central authority, the tribe maintained a lucrative protection system known as khuwwa. While the term etymologically suggests 'brotherhood' or a close social union, external observers frequently characterized the practice as a form of blackmail. They provided armed escorts and guaranteed safe passage through these specific desert territories for foreign travelers and scientific expeditions.

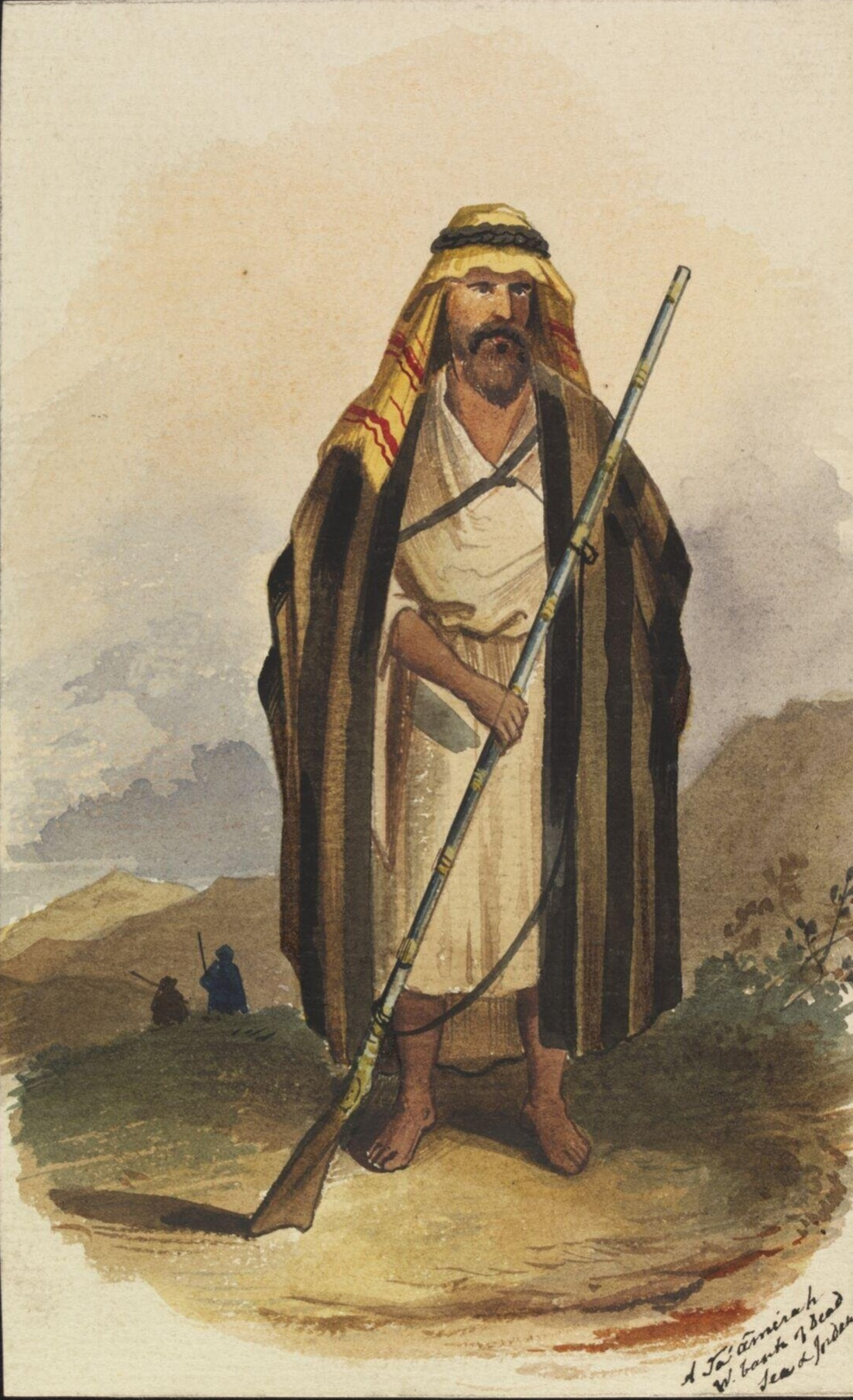
1847-1848 field watercolor sketch of an armed Ta'amireh tribesman on the western bank of the Dead Sea, Palestine.

This protection system also extended to weaker nomadic groups in the region, such as the neighboring Rashayida tribe; being a small and unwarlike group, they maintained good terms with the Ta'amireh and paid them a tribute to secure protection. This practice also applied to local sedentary communities; for instance, the Yemenite inhabitants of Beit Sahour paid a recurring khuwwa to the Ta'amireh in exchange for the tribe's defense against repeated attacks from Qaysi factions. However, this system was heavily coercive; the tribe expected annual gifts from neighboring towns such as Bethlehem, and figures like the Ta'mari Sheikh Safi ez-Zeer were known to raid and plunder when a group of people refused to pay separate extortions outside the collective tribal agreements. The tribe similarly targeted communities like Beit Jala, using armed intimidation to press residents for regular protection money.

== Demography ==
=== Population ===
In 1834, the Ta'amireh could raise at least 1,000 gunmen. In 1847, the tribe had 300 tents. In 1864, the Ta'amreh had 1700 gunmen and 10 horsemen. In 1875, the Ta'amreh tribe numbered a total of 5,000 people, of whom 1,000 were men. They had around 400 tents at that time.

In 1922, the tribe numbered a total of 6000 people, of whom were 2800 men and 3200 women. In 1948, it consisted of 8000 people. Around 1979, the tribe numbered about 20,000 people.

=== Subtribes ===
The Ta'amireh consists of sub-tribes: Bani Sa'ad (pluralized as 'al-Sa'ada'), Bani Hajjaj (pluralized as 'al-Hajahija'), Bani Umayr (pluralized as 'al-Umayrat') and al-ʿUbayyat wa al-Kasaba. They were involved in the Qays–Yaman rivalry, and belonged to the Yemenite (Yaman) party of Palestine. Following demographic expansion in the 19th century, the Ta'amireh split into three administrative sections known as a thulth (plural athlāth, meaning 'one-third') to manage internal affairs such as tax collection, land distribution, and defense. These three sections comprised Thulth al-Sa'ada and Thulth al-Hajahija, both originating from the Bani Harith, and Thulth al-Kasaba, which consisted of less homogeneous groups. The supposed original agrarian families of Beit Taʿmir were distributed among the three athlāth and finally absorbed into them. As time passed, each thulth also absorbed additional non-Bedouin families. Over time, prolonged demographic pressures and sedentarization caused these units to fracture into smaller independent groups. According to Aharon Layish, Thulth al-Kasaba divided into the al-Ubayyat, which further decentralized into the al-Nawawira and al-Nabahin, and the al-Muhariba, which split into the al-Zawahira, al-Danadina, and al-Wahsh. Thulth al-Hajahija split into the al-Zir and the Al Salim, while Thulth al-Saʿada divided into the al-Shawawira and al-Sharayi'a. In contrast, Max von Oppenheim documented an alternative structure, classifying the al-Muhariba as a branch of the al-Ubayyat, and noting additional branches within Thulth al-Hajahija, such as the al-Asakira and the al-Salahat.

== Geography ==
=== Territory ===
The ancestral territory of the Ta'amireh tribe was located in the region of Palestine, spanning from 'Ain Jidy at the southwestern coast of the Dead Sea, extending northwest up to Bethlehem, and reaching across the desert to the northwestern tip of the Dead Sea, encompassing parts of the southwestern Jordan River region.

Because of this geographic distribution, the tribe's territory encompassed the regional routes most frequented by foreign travelers and expeditions, specifically the transit corridors connecting Jerusalem, Jericho, 'Ain Jidy, and Bethlehem. Within their northwestern desert lands, the Ta'amireh controlled crucial freshwater sources and coastal oases, including the prominent fountains of 'Ain el-Feshkhah, 'Ain el-Ghuweir, and 'Ain Terabeh. Their territory also extended northward into the upper reaches of Wadi Dabr and the plateau surrounding Nebi Musa, along the route between Jerusalem and Jericho. In this northern region around Nebi Musa and Jericho, their boundaries met the lands of the Ghawarinah and Sawahirah tribes. The desert plain that is bounded by Wadi Dabr to the north and Wadi an-Nar to the south, and which forms part of the traditional Ta'amireh territory, is known as al-Baqei'ah.

The southern boundary of their range met the territory of the neighboring Jahalin tribe near 'Ain Jidy. Historical accounts note that the two tribes maintained friendly relations, which allowed traveling parties to seamlessly pass between their respective boundaries by swapping tribal escorts at the frontier. Further west along this southern frontier, their presence extended into the Hebron hills; in the wilderness of Ziph, the open agricultural fields were shared with the Hebronites, though they were recognized as being chiefly Ta'amireh property. There were also those of the Ta'amireh who dwelt in the village of Bani Na'im east of Hebron.

=== Villages ===
The sedentarization of the Ta'amirah was a gradual and spontaneous process driven by individuals rather than government or tribal intervention, with the majority of the tribe establishing permanent homes within their own traditional territory. While the first significant signs of this transition appeared in the 1920s, the process intensified during the 1950s and late 1960s, shifting the population from a semi-nomadic lifestyle to fixed localities.

Following the gradual sedentarization of the Ta'amireh tribe, several permanent towns and villages were established across their traditional territory in Palestine, ranging from compact agrarian localities near the highlands to expansive pastoral tracts extending into the Judean Desert:

- Tuqu': Sits on the largest total area within the desert slopes, encompassing approximately 191,262 dunums. The vast majority of this footprint—188,845 dunums—is classified as arable land, while the residential built-up area covers 530 dunums.
- Kisan: Covers a total area of 133,330 dunums deeper within the desert range. It retains 132,288 dunums as arable land, with a small residential footprint spanning 79 dunums.
- Nabi Musa: Covers a total area of approximately 112,795 dunums. Within this territory, 19,471 dunums are considered arable land, while the residential built-up footprint accounts for 81 dunums.
- Al 'Ubeidiya: Covers a total area of 97,232 dunums. Its desert areas connect directly to the coastal springs of 'Ain el-Feshkhah and Qumran. Out of this territory, 96,032 dunums are classified as arable land, while the residential town covers 563 dunums.
- As-Sawahira ash-Sharqiya: Bounded by the lands of Nabi Musa to the north and east, it covers a total area of 69,242 dunums. Within this territory, 53,735 dunums are considered arable land, while the residential built-up area spans 920 dunums.
- Fasayil: Lies on a total area of around 46,826 dunums. Within this footprint, 26,429 dunums are considered arable land, while 322 dunums are registered as residential built-up land.
- Ash-Shawawra: Lies on a total area of about 15,644 dunums. The village includes three localities: Al Haddadiya, Al Khishna, and Fakht el Jul. Out of this territory, 15,163 dunums are considered arable land, while 153 dunums are residential land.
- Jannatah: Encompasses a total area of 11,901 dunums. The town includes six other smaller localities: Rakhma, al-‘Asakra, Khallet al Karaneen, Al ‘Ukab, Harmala, and the Abu Njeim locality. Out of its total territory, 10,941 dunums are classified as arable land—while the residential built-up area spans 319 dunums.
- Za'atara: Spans a total area of 7,748 dunums near the central heartland. Of this territory, 7,110 dunums are considered arable land, while the residential built-up area accounts for 320 dunums.
- Hindaza: Occupies a total area of 5,121 dunums, with 4,585 dunums classified as arable land and 236 dunums serving as residential land.
- Dar Salah: Encompasses a total area of 4,398 dunums. The village includes four other localities: Al Hajeila, Juhdom, Umm Al Qassis, and the Umm ‘Asla locality. Out of its total territory, 3,989 dunums are considered arable land, while 220 dunums are residential land.
- Khallet al Louza: Lies on a total area of about 3,880 dunums. Out of this territory, 3,714 dunums are considered arable land, while 65 dunums are residential land.
- Beit Ta'mir: Encompasses a total area of 2,138 dunums. The village features 2,028 dunums of arable land, with a residential built-up area of 53 dunums.
- Marah Rabah: Lies on a total area of about 1,895 dunums. Out of this territory, 1,589 dunums are considered arable land, while 49 dunums are residential land.
- Khallet al Haddad: Lies on a total area of about 1,742 dunums. Out of this territory, 1,678 dunums are considered arable land, while 24 dunums are residential land.
- Al-Khas and An-Nu'man: A joint peripheral locality covering a total area of 1,474 dunums, which includes 1,294 dunums of arable land and a residential built-up area of 31 dunums.
- Al-Ma'sara: Covers a total area of 973 dunums, with 877 dunums utilized as arable land, while 42 dunums constitute the residential built-up area.
- Jubbet adh-Dhib: Lies on a total area of about 402 dunums. Within this territory, 341 dunums are considered arable land, while 8 dunums serve as residential land.

=== Topography and climate ===
The Bethlehem District covers a total land area of 575 square kilometers. Within this regional framework, the western boundary of the Ta'amireh territory meets Bethlehem city, which is situated at an altitude of 772 meters above sea level. Across the district, the mean annual temperature ranges between 17°C and 23°C, and the mean annual evaporation ranges between 1400 and 2600 millimeters.

The geographic range of the tribe is defined by distinct soil variations and climatic parameters that dictated their historical lifestyle and modern land use:

- Climate and Rainfall: The mean annual rainfall across the district ranges from a high of 700 millimeters down to 100 millimeters. In the western portion near Bethlehem city, the mean annual rainfall records at 501 millimeters. This steep climatic decline directly mirrors the environmental shift across the Ta'amireh lands as they recede eastward from the fertile highlands into the rain shadow desert.
- Western and Central Soils: Cultivated agricultural sections are located on flat, deep brown rendzinas soil. In contrast, shallow depth and steep areas with brown rendzinas soil are used for olive and grape plantations or as grazing areas.
- Eastern Grazing Range: Lands extending from the northeastern to the southeastern boundaries form the vast desert expanse of the Ta'amireh range; these lands have low agricultural value but constitute the major grazing areas of the district. These eastern parts are covered by approximately 15,000 hectares of bare rocks and desert lithosols, which are characterized by bare rocks and slight soil depths at plateau and moderately sloping areas, historically serving as the primary seasonal pastures for the tribe's herds.

== European travelers' observations ==
In 1673–1674, the Jesuit priest Michel Nau described travelling south of Bethlehem through areas associated with the Taʿāmireh, passing Bayt Thamar (Beit Taʿmir) en route to Thecua (Tuquʿ). He noted a high, steep, and isolated mountain about a league from Bethlehem, known locally as Ferdays (al-Firdaus). He recorded that he had heard it referred to as the 'Mountain of the Franks', and observed that it contained the ruins of a large fortress covering much of its summit. As the party attempted to ascend, local Arabs confronted them and threw large stones from above until they were turned back and later allowed to proceed under the protection of interpreters. At the summit, Nau observed extensive remains of a fortress, including cellars and foundations, said to have been built by the Franks for the defence of the Holy Places and held for many years before surrendering due to hunger. After descending, the travellers continued to Thecua, which he described as a former considerable city in ruins, containing a partially standing church said to have been dedicated to St. Nicholas, and surrounded by fertile valleys and forests. At Thecua, local Arabs gathered, including the chiefs of those who had earlier opposed them, who later apologized and offered hospitality in the form of a dish made of flour and honey. Nau further noted that their tents were pitched at a distance near wooded areas, with households and herds of camels in the surrounding countryside.

In 1646, the Franciscan priest Bernardin Surius, Commissary of the Holy Land and President of the Holy Sepulchre, described Tefcué (Tekoa) as a site south of Bethlehem associated with biblical tradition, identifying it as the birthplace of the prophet Amos and noting the presence of church ruins. He also recorded nearby remains including a mountain fortress referred to locally as “Bethli el Frangi”, “Bethulie of the French”, which he stated had been maintained by Christians for some years after Saladin's conquest before falling into ruin. Surius further related an anecdote of a Muslim traveller from Bethli el Frangi (Bethulie) or its surroundings who bore a cross-shaped mark and expressed belief in Jesus, which he interpreted as evidence of lingering Christian continuity in the region. In parts of the Middle East, including among some Bedouin and other Muslim populations, forms of decorative or protective tattooing (washm) were historically practiced for purposes such as ornamentation and folk medicine, including protection against illness and the evil eye.

In 1806, the traveller Ulrich Jasper Seetzen reported a local belief that the Taʿāmireh took pride in being regarded as descendants of the Knights of St. John associated with the summit fortress at el Pherdéis (Herodium / al-Fureidis). He noted that the ruins atop el Pherdéis were identified with a stronghold once held by the Knights, and that this association formed part of local tradition. Steezen, however, expressed skepticism toward the account, suggesting that it likely reflected a European-influenced legend rather than a historically transmitted oral genealogy, and attributing its emergence to external European influence, as well as the absence of written records and literacy among the tribe.

In 1841, Edward Robinson, drawing on his 1838 travels, rejected the Crusader-origin tradition associated with el Pherdéis (Herodium), arguing that the name “Frank Mountain” was a European designation based on a circulating report that the site had been held by the Crusaders for forty years after the fall of Jerusalem. He noted the absence of any mention of such an occupation in either Christian or Muslim crusade historiography, and concluded that the tradition most likely originated as a late medieval legend, first appearing in modern accounts associated with Felix Fabri in 1483 and subsequently repeated by later travellers in varying forms. Robinson also argued that the identification of the site was influenced by a broader expectation that a prominent cone-shaped mountain south of Jerusalem must correspond to Herod the Great’s Herodium. He stated that earlier suggestions of this identification predated his own visit in 1838, citing Mariti, Berggren, and Raumer, and noting that monks from Mar Saba had already pointed out the site as Herod’s castle (Erodion), although without firm identification. Robinson himself therefore positioned the Herodian identification as a cumulative scholarly development rather than a discovery originating with him.

According to The Expositor's Bible Commentary (1908), it is suggested that the Ta'amirah Arabs of the Judean wilderness are descendants of fellahin who later reverted to a desert way of life.

German theologian Hartmut Stegemann connected the modern tribe to a historical group mentioned in the apocryphal First Book of Maccabees (1 Maccabees 9:66), suggesting that the Ta'amirah have inhabited the region between Bethlehem and the Dead Sea for over two millennia and were anciently known as "Odomera." According to this view, support from the Odomera enabled the Maccabean leaders Jonathan and Simon to defeat the Seleucid general Bacchides at the Battle of Bethbasi in 157 BC. In biblical accounts, both the Odomera and the related group, the Phasiron, are identified as nomadic Arab tribes living in tents within the Judean wilderness.

Further Western and Orientalist sources offer views on the tribe's probable origins, as summarized by Aharon Layish. The first view is that of Max von Oppenheim, who suggested that they are of peasant origin in which their name is derived from Khirbat Beit Ta’mir although the tribesmen themselves trace their origin to Bani Harith. Oppenheim also mentions that an area in the vicinity of Jerusalem is named after Bani Harith, the origin of which is unknown. However, historical records document that a Bani Harith quarter existed in Jerusalem as early as the Mamluk period in the 13th century. The anthropologist Frank H. Stewart views they have no connection to the Bani Harith or to tribes originating from the Hejaz, and that they may instead be of peasant origin.

A magazine published by the British evangelical Christian organization known as the Religious Tract Society describes the Ta'amirah are described as distinct from both Bedouins and fellahin, observing Bedouin customs in most respects, but also engaging in cultivation, traditionally living in black tents, and bearing a name that resembles that of the ancient Amorites.

According to Guarmani, cited by Oppenheim, who travelled in Palestine around 1864, and based on oral tradition, the Taʿamireh tribe claim descent from Bani Harith horsemen who left their territory in Wadi Musa due to blood disputes at a date impossible to ascertain and settled in Beit Taʿmir, where they rebuilt its ruins with their families. The new inhabitants of Beit Taʿmir are said to have abandoned the ancient name of Bani Harith and adopted the designation Taʿmari. It is also reported that the Taʿamireh later resumed a nomadic lifestyle due to enmity with the fellahin of the Hebron region.

According to an alternative account of the tribe's oral tradition recorded by geographer Avshalom Shmueli during interviews in the 1960s, Beit Ta'mir was not entirely abandoned when the Bani Harith arrived from Hejaz. In this version, the incoming Bani Harith integrated the existing local peasantry, eventually dominating the settlement and adopting the village's name to become a semi-nomadic entity that gradually absorbed further nomadic elements. Shmueli posited several factors driving their subsequent shift toward a nomadic lifestyle after initial settlement: demographic pressures on the land, a breakdown of regional security, a desire to evade Ottoman taxation and conscription, and an enduring cultural inclination toward nomadism. Under this arrangement, Beit Ta'mir functioned primarily for crop storage and seasonal accommodation.

However, Stewart has challenged Shmueli's narrative, characterizing the proposition of a Bedouin tribe merging with a sedentary peasant population only to adopt the name of the peasants' village as highly improbable. Stewart argues that while Bedouin groups historically absorbed peasant (fellahin) elements, they consistently retained their original tribal nomenclature rather than adopting a geographic name. Furthermore, he emphasizes that the Ta'amireh would have a strong ideological interest in framing their lineage as purely Bedouin rather than originating from settled farmers who later adopted nomadism.

== History ==
=== Ottoman era ===
==== Notices in 16th and 17th-century Jerusalem court records ====
The Taʿamireh are recorded in court and administrative documents in connection with taxation, agriculture, conflict, and public works in the region of Jerusalem.

On 2 February 1531 (3 Jumada al-Akhir 937 AH), a Jerusalem Sharia Court record documents a financial dispute between Jalal al-Din ibn Makki and ʿAli al-Taʿmari concerning a debt arising from a guarantee arrangement and the price of a handkerchief. The court ruled that ʿAli al-Taʿmari was liable for the outstanding amount. Khalil Tuquʿi of Tuquʿ (Tekoa) is also mentioned in connection with the transaction. The record identifies ʿAli al-Taʿmari as belonging to ‘Arab al-Taʿāmira, an Arab tribal group residing east of Bethlehem.

On 13 July 1549 (17 Jumada al-Thani 956 AH), a Jerusalem Sharia Court record concerning the tax revenues (muqataʿa) of the al-Fureidis (Herdoium) farm near Bethlehem describes the estate as being “under the hand of the Taʿamireh”. The case involved Hasan ibn ʿAbd al-Sabbahi, with obligations recorded against Shaʿban ibn Ahmad and Muhammad ibn ʿUmayr of Bethlehem.

On 20 July 1555 (1 Ramadan 962 AH), a Jerusalem Sharia Court record documents a transaction wherein Sheikh Sharaf Yahya ibn al-Sheikh Ahmad ibn Abi Sharif purchased a six-karat share from the dowry of a horse from Hasan ibn Muhammad of Arab al-'Ubayyat from the village of Ta'mir.

On 21 November 1556 (18 Muharram 964 AH), a Jerusalem Sharia Court record documents the purchase of a fractional share (qirāṭ) in a horse by Shihab al-Din ibn ʿAli ibn al-Murub of al-ʿEizariya, in partnership with Ahmad ibn ʿUqab and ʿAli ibn Masʿud of ‘Arab al-Taʿamireh. The entry further records disciplinary action against one of the participants for failing to comply with a court ruling.

On 19 October 1584 (Shawwal 992 AH), a Jerusalem Sharia Court record concerning a loan of 10 sultani coins identifies Jafal ibn Ziyada of ‘Arab al-Taʿāmireh as the party responsible for repayment, with Tayeh ibn Mansur acting as guarantor. The case involved enforcement of a debt obligation recorded in the Jerusalem court.

On 25 December 1584 (Dhu al-Hijjah 992 AH), a Jerusalem Sharia Court record documents a dispute concerning the return of a horse held as a deposit (wadiʿa). The case involved Shafiʿ ibn Hasan of ‘Arab al-Taʿāmira and Jumuʿa Jawish ibn ʿAbd Allah, who stated that the animal was a deposit belonging to Ahmad Katkhuda of Jerusalem.

On 24 May 1586 (5 Jumada II 994 AH), a Jerusalem Sharia Court record concerning the tax revenues (muqāṭaʿa) of Dayr al-Najma farm describes the estate as associated with ‘Arab al-Taʿāmira. The estate was placed under judicial supervision due to the absence of its administrator, and a settlement of six Ottoman gold coins (sultani) is recorded.

On 11 August 1586 (Shawwal 994 AH), a Jerusalem Sharia Court record documents a claim made by Taʿma ibn Salim of ‘Arab al-Taʿāmira against ʿAli ibn Diyab al-Ḥals of Bayt Sahur al-Wadi, concerning a quantity of eight mudd of barley.

On 11 March 1587 (41 Rabiʿ II 995 AH), a Jerusalem Sharia Court record documents testimony by Salih ibn Muʿammar and Ismaʿil ibn ʿUmayra of ‘Arab al-Taʿāmira confirming the death of Jibril ibn ʿAwda al-Naṣrani al-Talḥmi approximately one year earlier.

On 15 June 1587 (69 Rajab 995 AH), a Jerusalem Sharia Court record documents the arrest of an individual accused of theft from the house of Hamd ibn al-Saʿdi in the quarter of Bani Zayd. The accused is identified as Hasan ibn Dib of ‘Arab al-Taʿāmira. The arrest was carried out in the presence of ʿAli Jawish, acting on behalf of the governor of Jerusalem, Khudawardi Bek Abi Sayfayn.

On 1 October 1587 (22 Shawwal 995 AH), a Jerusalem Sharia Court record documents an agreement involving ‘Arab al-Taʿāmira for the supply of stone for the reconstruction of the al-Marjiʿ pool (Solomon's Pools) in Jerusalem. The record lists several Taʿāmira sheikhs, including Nashi ibn Hasan, ʿAli ibn Masʿud, Tayeh ibn Mansur, and Musa ibn ʿAmir, as participants in the work under Ottoman supervision.

On 23 June 1588 (128 Rajab 996 AH), a Jerusalem Sharia Court record documents a tax-farm payment in which Musa ibn Shuqra acted as guarantor for the sheikhs of ‘Arab al-Taʿāmireh, identified as Musa ibn Sabʿ and Musa ibn Ghanim. The payment of 30 sultani coins was recorded as the levy of their village and transferred to Ottoman authorities.

A 1588 Ottoman court record concerns a claim over a share of the agricultural produce of the village of Bayt Taʿmar, associated with the waqf of Ibn Abi Sharif. The case involves Sheikh ʿAbd al-Qadir ibn Yahya ibn Abi Sharif, who makes a claim against Mustafa ibn Ḥals of ‘Arab al-Taʿāmira.

On 29 August 1588 (26 Shawwal 996 AH), a Jerusalem Sharia Court record documents a debt of three qintars of oil linked to agricultural tax-farm revenue in Bayt Sahur. Muhammad ibn Shakkara is recorded as liable, with Hamida bint Tawashi and ʿAli ibn ʿAnqa of Bethlehem, and Tayeh ibn Mansur, sheikh of ‘Arab al-Taʿāmira, acting as guarantors.

In 1603/4 (1012 AH), a Bedouin named Sha‘ala of ‘Arab al-Ta‘āmira sold a beast of burden, originally stolen from Jindas near Lydda, to Sālim b. Ghunaym, resident of the village of Dayr al-Sinna in the Kidron Valley near Jerusalem.

On 21 November 1608 (21 Shaʿban 1017 AH), a Jerusalem Sharia Court record documents wage payments for the repair of the Sabil Canal and al-Marjiʿ pools. Ahmad al-Taʿmari acted as representative (wakīl) of ʿArab al-Taʿāmira, receiving payment on behalf of the tribe from the waqf administration.

On 14 December 1614 (12 Dhu al-Qi'dah 1023 AH), a Jerusalem Sharia Court record documents a legal power of attorney (wakala) for the payment of fees on the villages of the Taʿāmira (qurā al-Taʿāmira) running within the Khass (private revenue domain) of Muhammad Bey, the governor (Amir Liwa) of Jerusalem. Several tribal representatives organized the proxy, including Musa ibn Sabʿ al-Taʿmari, Mufrej ibn Tayeh, Juwayfil ibn Sulayman al-Taʿmari, Nafiʿ ibn Hubays, and Bajas ibn Nassar, alongside the rest of the Taʿāmira tribe. The record states that they officially designated Juwayfil as their collective legal proxy to deliver the required dues.

On 14 February 1615 (15 Muharram 1024 AH), a Jerusalem Sharia Court record documents the payment of wages for labor and transportation services related to the repair of the Sabil Canal and the al-Marjiʿ pools. The waqf administrator ʿAbd al-Muḥsin ibn Maḥmud, chief architect (miʿmārbāshī) of Jerusalem, oversaw the works. Several tribal representatives received payment, including Mustafa, sheikh of the Umayrat; Musa ibn Sabʿ, sheikh of the Ubayyat; Juwayfil, sheikh of the Saʿda; Mufrej ibn Tayeh, sheikh of the Kasaba; Husayn ibn ʿAlaʾ al-Din, sheikh of the Yaʿaqiba; Yaʿqub, sheikh of the Makhalif; and Hamud ibn ʿUmar, sheikh of Bayt Sahur. The record notes that Ahmad Jawish ibn ʿAbd Allah certified the works on behalf of the governor of Jerusalem following inspection and approval of the canal repairs between Solomon’s Pools and Bethlehem.

On 19 August 1615 (24 Rajab 1024 AH), a Jerusalem Sharia Court record documents an acknowledgment of a debt where Husayn ibn ʿAlaʾ al-Din, Dakhallah ibn Muḥey, Hasan ibn Ma'ali, Juwayfil ibn Sulayman, and Mansur ibn Tayeh of the Taʿāmira tribe are recorded as liable for providing fifteen qintar of gypsum for the construction of the Dome of the Rock.

==== Tribal feuds, raids and battles ====
From 1603 to 1621, Farrukh Pasha governed the sanjak of Jerusalem and Nablus. Prior to his nomination, local Muslim notables petitioned the sultan, stating that unruly Bedouin tribes surrounded Jerusalem and prevented pilgrims and visitors from passing. Farrukh took measures to stop these Bedouin incursions. In his capacity as amir al-hajj, he relied on the local Ta'amireh tribe, who assisted the governor in the Judean Desert by intercepting and fighting off Bedouins traveling toward Transjordan. Farukh killed or imprisoned members of defiant groups and provided rewards to tribes that cooperated with him, including the Ta'amireh.

On May 13, 1605, the Ta'amireh tribe of Palestine, in collaboration with the Bani Sakhr, Abbad, and al-Kilabina tribes of Transjordan, raided the village of Beit Sahour near Jerusalem. This attack was part of a series of Bedouin incursions that exploited the weakened Ottoman authority in the region. It illustrates that Palestinian Bedouins, such as the Ta'amireh, occasionally coordinated with Bedouins from adjacent regions like Transjordan. In 1623, the Ta'amireh and other Arab tribes including the Ka'abneh, Zuwaydiyin, Baraghishah-Hutaym, and the Arab villagers of Ain Silwan, at-Tur, and Issawiya, attacked a convoy of traders from the Balaqina (Arabs from Balqa in Transjordan) on their return to Abu Dis after selling their goods in Jerusalem. The attackers killed several members of Muhammad ibn Mansi's group from the Balaqina and thirteen camels and seized additional camels, highlighting the ongoing tribal conflicts and the Ta'amireh's significant involvement during this period. In 1654, the Ta'amireh cut down a vineyard in the al-Baq'ah area of Jerusalem.

In 1771, the Ta'amireh, with support from Bethlehem's residents, seized a large tract of land from the nearby Hutaym tribe, compelling the latter to relinquish its claims to the land and sue for peace. In 1799, local leaders of the Ta'amireh along with other leaders of the al-Wadiyah nahiya (subdistrict), allied to resist Napoleon's military campaign in Palestine. This coalition mustered 500 warriors dedicated to that end. The mobilization is documented in the Sharia court registers of Jerusalem, which reflect the administrative efforts of the Ottoman authorities to record local responses to external threats during this period. The record includes several representatives from local tribes and clans, among them Ta'amireh sheikhs Abd Rabbo al-Ta'mari, Ali al-Subh, Ahmad al-Tanah, and Abu Dayyah.

In 1808, the Ta'amira aided the villagers of Deir Dibwan in the highlands north of Jerusalem from an attack by a party of 350 Hejaya Arabs from southern Transjordan; in the tribo-political factionalism which divided Palestinians into the Qays and Yaman parties, both the Ta'amireh and the villagers were part of the Yaman. The Ta'amireh drove out the Hejaya and pursued them to Wadi Derejeh near Jerusalem, where a heavy battle took place and the Ta'amireh were defeated, losing two or three of their men. A blood feud persisted between the two tribes from that point and the Hejaya proceeded to raid the Mar Saba monastery in the battle's aftermath. Following the incident at Mar Saba, internal infighting broke out among the Hejaya.

In early 1825, following an order by the governor of Damascus, Mustafa Pasha, to double tithes on the fellaheen (peasants) of the Jerusalem district, the Ta'amireh allied themselves with the inhabitants of Bethlehem, the Lahham family, and fugitives from nearby villages. They barricaded in three monasteries in Bethlehem belonging to the Greeks, Franks, and Armenians and resisted Mustafa Pasha, but were bested by the Ottomans, who punished the villagers and the Christian monks alike. After Mustafa Pasha returned to Damascus, in May 1825, the Ta'amireh revolted and were joined by some Muslims from Bethlehem. The Ottoman soldiers guarding Bethlehem had mistreated the local population, insulting women and oppressing Christians. During the uprising, some Ottoman soldiers were killed and others expelled. The mutesellim (deputy governor) of Jerusalem appointed Musa Bey to lead a military response. The rebels fortified villages around the monastery of St. Elias but were forced to retreat after three days of artillery bombardment. Musa Bey then took a strategic position between Bethlehem and Beit Jala. Meanwhile, armed men in Jerusalem seized ammunition from the citadel, sparking a wider revolt.

Ottoman Syria was conquered by the forces of Egypt, a semi-autonomous province of the empire, in 1831. Egyptian orders to tax and conscript the peasants led to a widescale peasants' revolt in Palestine in 1834. The Ta'amireh joined the rebellion, fighting alongside the peasants of Sa'ir against an Egyptian force that had been sent againt the village. The battle resulted in the death of 25 Egyptian soldiers and the retreat of the remaining forces from Hebron. On 1 June 1834, the Ta'amireh mustered 1,000 gunmen to defend themselves and the Christians of Bethlehem against Egyptian troops' attempted plunder of the town. As part of these hostilities, the tribe participated in the capture of Jerusalem, where their sheikh was supposedly the first man to enter the city. The revolt was suppressed later that year and the Ta'amireh were later enlisted to support the Egyptian authorities' attempts to capture deserters of the Jerusalem garrison in May 1837; the tribesmen captured fifty deserters and handed them over to Jerusalem's governor. Ottoman rule was restored in 1841.

In 1843, the Ta'amireh attacked the Bani Sakhr amid an ongoing blood feud, stealing 300 camels (according to Bani Sakhr) or 30 camels (according to the Ta'amireh). In 1852, the Ta'amireh tribe participated in an expedition against the Druze. The tribe had been part of the troops of Nablus (4,000 Arab warriors) under the Ottoman sultan's leadership. In 1853, the Ta'amireh, Jahalin, and Tiyaha tribes joined forces in a campaign against the Suqur tribe, based in the regions of Tiberias and Bisan. The allied tribes overpowered the Suqur and looted their livestock, including 60 cows, 30 donkeys, several camels, as well as sheep and goats. In September 1853, during a period of weakened Ottoman control, the Ta'amireh allied with the Tiyaha to marshal support for rival leaders of the Adwan tribe of the Balqa, Nimr and Abdulaziz. In the summer of 1853, the Ta'amireh, responding to drought and the failure of springs in their usual grazing areas between Bethlehem and the Dead Sea, invaded the valley of Artas in search of water for their flocks and herds. A large group of Ta'amireh arrived with thousands of camels, sheep, and goats, utilizing the valley's resources to sustain their animals. Historically, the Ta'amireh had dominated the valley, only withdrawing due to agreements with John Meshullam, a British subject who had settled in Artas in partnership with local peasants.

In 1853, the Ta'amireh, Tiyaha, and Malikiyyah tribes, along with the Abu Ghosh clan, formed a coalition that occupied Bethlehem for two weeks following a series of battles. The coalition consisted of at least 800 men, half of whom were mounted and armed with spears. This alliance was led by the Ta'amireh sheikhs and Abu Ghosh leaders. After the two-week occupation of Bethlehem, the coalition of the Ta'amireh, Tiyaha, and Malikiyyah tribes was ordered by the governing pasha to evacuate the city within three hours. However, instead of complying with the order, the coalition proceeded to assault Beit Jala for three days, which had already been occupied by their rivals, the Hassaniyah tribe.

In 1856, the Ta'amireh tribe attacked and defeated an Ottoman agha and his troops near Bethlehem. This battle occurred in the same region as a later conflict in 1858, reinforcing the Ta'amireh’s resistance to Ottoman authority. On September 23, 1858, Sheikh Safi ez-Zeer at-Ta'mari led the Ta'amireh in an ambush against an Ottoman force near Rachel's Tomb, just outside Bethlehem. The Ottoman force, led by Shakir Agha, the governor of Bethlehem and an officer of the bashi-bazouk with the rank of Yüz-Başı (captain), was escorting Ta'amireh prisoners to Jerusalem when over 100 Ta'amireh fighters attacked. During the battle, Shakir Agha was severely wounded; his arm was cut across by a sword, and his side was pierced by a spear thrown by Safi ez-Zeer. Shakir Agha was killed, the prisoners were freed, and the Ottoman forces suffered significant casualties. In 1859, the Ta'amireh tribe launched a raid near the walls of Jerusalem. During this attack, they plundered the area, looting 400 sheep. In 1860, the Ta'amireh tribe mounted a successful raid on the village of Al-Khader, seizing control and plundering its crops in the process.

In 1872, the Bani 'Atiyyah tribe maintained an active blood feud against the Ta'amireh, intercepting travelers arriving from Palestine hoping to attack members of the Ta'amireh tribe. During an encounter in the region of Moab, a European research group was intercepted by a Bani 'Atiyyah raiding group led by a single mounted horseman with a long spear alongside 150 on-foot tribesmen who were stripped for combat. Under the mistaken assumption that the travelers were harboring Ta'amireh tribesmen, the horseman threatened the research group and declared the Ta'amireh tribe to be his exclusive enemies. The confrontation was defused because the expedition had previously declined an offer by the Ta'amireh tribesmen at Hebron to accompany them as guides and did not have a single person from the Ta'amireh among them.

On 20 October 1888, a girl from the Ta'amireh tribe went out to gather wood near their encampment. Two young men from the nearby village of Beit Fajjar encountered her and attempted to assault her. She screamed loudly and ran back to the camp, shouting, "To arms! Your honour is soiled; in broad daylight your girls are violated!" The Ta’amrah men quickly armed themselves and launched a retaliatory attack on Beit Fajjar. They looted livestock, including herds, flocks, camels, and donkeys, and carried off all portable goods, while destroying others. During the hurried retreat of Beit Fajjar's villagers, four men were severely wounded. The Ta'amireh lived off the seized herds for several weeks. Ottoman authorities intervened by sending soldiers who recovered part of the stolen property, arrested the two young men, and took them to Jerusalem for trial.

=== British Mandatory period ===
Palestine became part of the British Mandate in 1920. During the 1936–1939 Arab revolt against British rule, a battle took place between Bethlehem and the village of al-Khader in 1938. It was led by Ibrahim al-Halif, commander of a local rebel group from Bethlehem, with the participation of many fighters from the Ta'amireh tribe. Dozens of British soldiers were reportedly killed, alongside three rebels. Members of the Ta'amireh tribe fought in the ranks of local rebels against the British in a battle at the village of Bani Na'im (between Bethlehem and Hebron), on 6 January 1939. Among the twelve rebels killed were Ibrahim al-Halif's cousin, Ali Hassouni, and Issa Abu Kaddum al-Ta'mari, commander of the Ta'amireh unit. According to contemporary accounts, the rebels killed and wounded approximately 75 British soldiers and according to an eyewitness, shot down a military aircraft.

== Dead Sea Scrolls (1940s-1950s) ==
Members of the Ta'amireh tribe discovered the Dead Sea Scrolls in the Qumran Caves starting from 1946-47, and in 1951 in the Murabba'at caves in the Judaean Desert.

The area around Qumran formed part of seasonal grazing grounds for the herds of shepherds from Ta'amireh tribe. The mild winter and early spring in the area there produced copious wild greens with a high salt and mineral content that would stave off intestinal diseases among the goats and sheep shepherded by the tribe.

As the Qumran caves are located in the ancestral lands of the Ta'amireh tribe, there is a legal basis to consider the artifacts discovered there as the cultural property of the tribe.

== See also ==
- Hanajira, Negev Bedouin tribe
- Palestinian Bedouin
