= Nuaman =

Arabic transcription(s)
  - Arabic: Nu'man
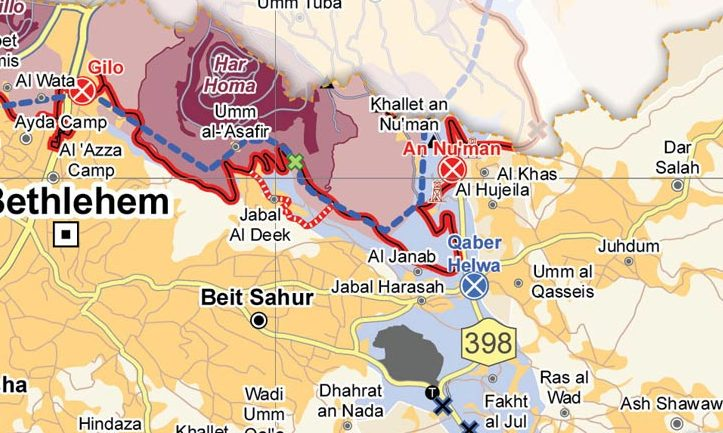
- Khallet an An Nu'man in a 2018 United Nations map, showing the access restrictions.

- Location of ash Nuaman within Palestine
- Coordinates: 31.7182°N 35.2418°E
- State: State of Palestine
- Governorate: Bethlehem

Government
  - Type: Municipality

Population (2017)
  - Total: 112

Nuaman or Khallet an Nu'man (Arabic: النعمان, meaning "Grace"), also written al-Numan/an-Nu'man, is a small village located just north of Beit Sahour in the Palestinian Governorate of Bethlehem. The Israeli government incorporated its territory within Jerusalem after the Israeli occupation of the West Bank in the 1967 Six-Day War. The village is regarded as neither part of the West Bank, nor part of Jerusalem. A United Nations report has described the villagers as "living in limbo." In terms of local government it is treated together with the neighbouring village Al-Khas, to the west, as one unit. The village had a population of 112 in 2017. Settled by families from the at-Ta'mira Bedouin tribe, it is part of the 'Arab al-Ta'mira village cluster, along with Za'atara, Beit Ta'mir, Hindaza, Tuqu', Khirbet ad-Deir (today part of Tuqu'), Ubeidiya and al-Asakra.

== Historical background ==
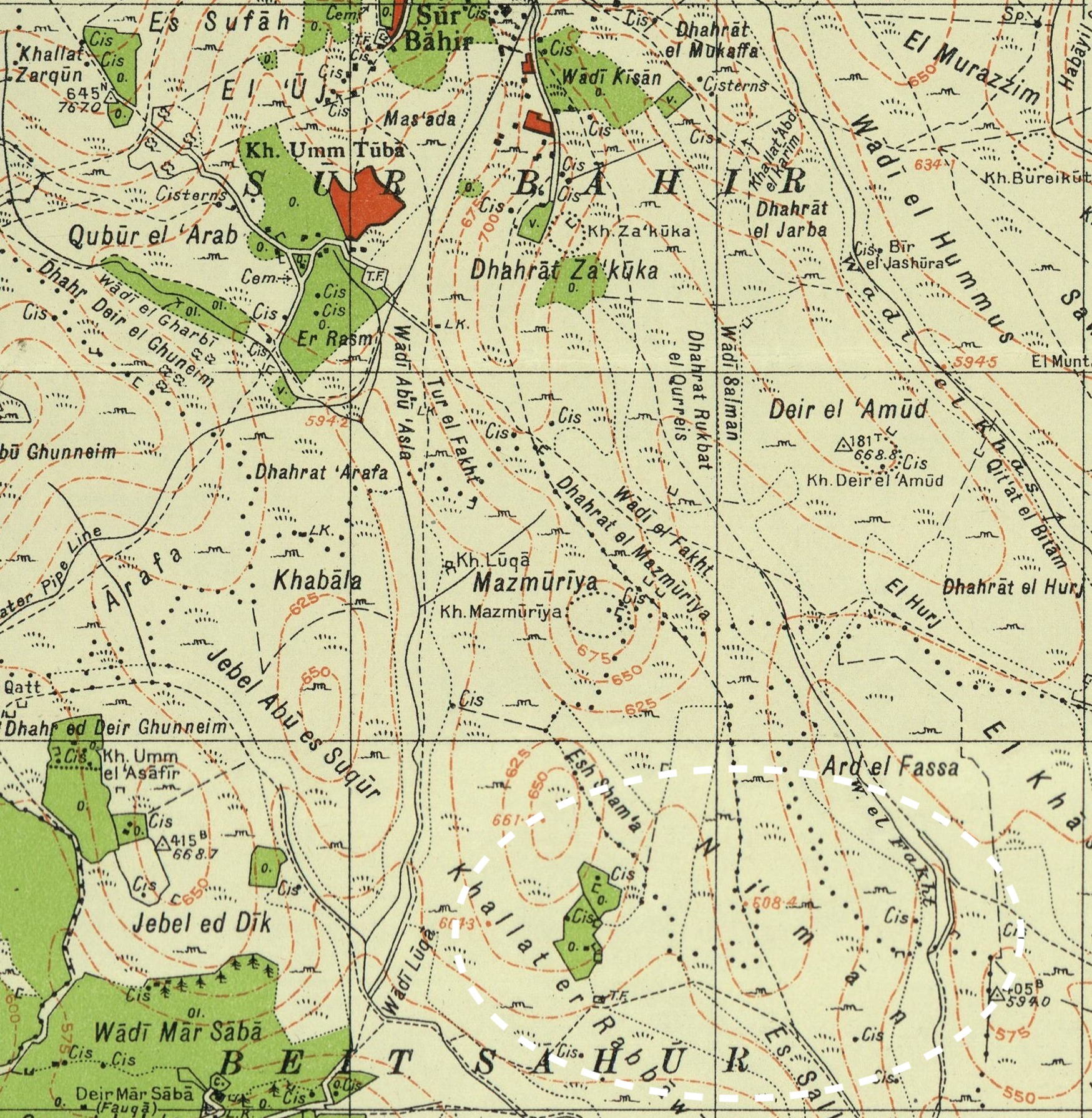
The area, entitled "Ni'man", in a 1940s Survey of Palestine map.

Nuaman itself is a tiny hamlet, built on a single street, and composed of roughly 25 houses, 13 of which existed, as shown by aerial photos of the period, before 1967. Since 1994, together with Al Khas to the west, Nuaman has been governed by a village council of five members appointed by the Palestinian Authority.

The hamlet's name is an eponym, taken from that of the traveler, Nu'man Ben Bisher, who resided there, and its history of habitation goes back at least to 1900. Palestinians began to develop the hamlet of Nuaman on a windy plateau between Jerusalem and Bethlehem in the 1930s during the period of the British Mandatory Government of Palestine. Two families, Bedouin of the Ta'amreh tribe, moved there, the Shawarwa and Darawi, fashioning dwellings from hollowed-out caves initially, and then moving into tents, and finally stone houses. The area was planted with pine breaks, cypress groves, lemon and olive orchards, and vegetable plots, and, in addition they maintained a pastoral economy of grazing sheep. It lies at an altitude of 576 m above sea level and has a mean annual rainfall of 356 mm. Together with Al-Khas, Nuaman lies on 1,474 dunams of land, of which 1,294 are arable, though not particularly fertile, and 31 residential. Title to extensive parts of the Nuaman territory is held by families in Beit Sahour and Sur Baher.

== 1967 ==
In 1967, when Israel occupied of the area, it made a military census that erred, according to B'Tselem, by defining Nuaman's population as residents of the West Bank. Since the head of a clan resided in Um A-Talla (Arabic: أم الطلع), (Note: Maps attest to a Khirbet Umm at Tala' just north of Ash-Shawawra, and another Umm at Tala' roughly 1 kilometre south of Kfar Etzion.) all the villagers were registered as belonging to that village, and Nuaman was erased from the Israeli map, being renamed Mazmuriya, a reference to a nearby Roman archaeological site. In consequence, they were issued with West Bank identity cards, as opposed to the Israeli identity cards that were distributed to other Palestinian residents in the now municipally unified area of Jerusalem. The oversight transformed most of the townsfolk overnight into illegal residents of the area under Israeli law. As of 2006, the population consisted of some 220 people, of whom an exiguous minority (10%) retained Jerusalem identity cards, having migrated there from neighbouring villages. (Note: According to Levy only one Nuaman resident had a Jerusalem blue card (Levy 2005).) The village was left undisturbed for over two decades. The lives and prospects of the Nuaman villagers have been affected since the mid-1990s by several developments. They were informed by the Jerusalem administration under Ehud Olmert in 1992/3 that no building would be permitted. A further threat arose with the establishment of the Israeli settlement of Har Homa in 1997, which then began to extend its growth over Nuaman's village land, and is planned to replace Nuaman itself. Secondly further confiscations were made to create a military zone. Thirdly, Israel requisitioned some 30 dunams of their land for the Mazmuriya trade terminal (2005), and fourthly, the Jerusalem Ring Road was routed in a way that cut through the hamlet. Finally, the Israeli Separation Barrier, which the Palestinians call the Apartheid Wall, girds the hamlet, cutting it off from Beit Sahour two hundred yards away. The barrier effectively cuts them off from the very West Bank where the Israeli authorities say they belong. Altogether the Wall spread over 2.89 km of the Nuaman-Khas village territory, confiscating 776 dunums of arable land and forest, while isolating Nuaman from its sister community. The Israeli authorities have over the past decades uprooted an estimated 1,000 olive trees, 150 grapevines and 1,000 stone-fruit trees from the joint Nuaman/Al-Khas lands.

The anomalous registration has meant that the Jerusalem municipality refuses to supply Nuaman with water, sewage and garbage collecting systems, and denies the inhabitants permits to build houses by denying them a zoning and residential development plan. Garbage trucks are denied entrance. The water pipes to the village from the Palestinian Authority were frequently broken by Israeli bulldozing from 1998 through to 2003, however, it being presumed because in that regard the village was treated as though it were part of the Jerusalem municipality. Bulldozing work on the Separation Wall in May 2006 again uprooted the water mains connections and tore down the only electricity pylon serving the village. The Israeli High Court of Justice, hearing an appeal by the villagers gave the Israeli Ministry of the Interior and the Jerusalem Municipal Council 2 months to resolve the status of the village, as either part of the West Bank or of Jerusalem. No decision either way has ever been forthcoming, and the indeterminacy of their status leaves them in a legal limbo. Family members, mothers, grandmothers and children separated by a few hundred metres cannot visit each other in Nuaman if they lack the proper village ID. Couples who married are prohibited from building a proper home, so no new families can be established, and of 13 expected to marry in 2006, 2 were constrained to build elsewhere, in al-Khas

Some of the infrastructural services they were refused by the Jerusalem authorities were met subsequently by the initiative of the Palestinian Authority. Young Nuaman women considering marriage find that their suitors are turned back by Israeli soldiers stationed at the village entrance. Other Palestinian suitors, from Jerusalem, back off because they would lose their Jerusalem residency rights if they marry a woman from Nuaman.

== Schooling ==
Nuaman has no school. For two years after the Oslo Peace Agreements in 1993, Nuaman children continued to receive their education in Jerusalem. In 1995 they began to be turned away or expelled from schools in Sur Baher and Umm Tuba because of a decision made by the Israeli Ministry of Knowledge of Jerusalem municipality, and now must walk across a valley, through checkpoints daily, to schools in the West Bank. The distance they must travel on foot each day is 6 kilometres each way. The measures mean they must waste much time in travel, and are frequently late to school because of checkpoint delays. As a university student, Ashraf Jamal Shawawra, had to travel daily to Al-Quds University in nearby Abu Dis, testified that he had to strip to the waist every day at the Nuaman checkpoint, then walk to al-'Beidiyya Street, where transport was available, a trip taking 45 minutes in all weather. From there the bus to Abu Dis suffer would suffer frequent delays of up to 2 hours, to pass the Container checkpoint. In normal circumstances, a journey from Nuaman to the Abu Dis campus would take 20 minutes. It took him roughly 6 hours to make the trip both ways each day.

== Home demolitions ==
The earliest demolition took place in 1986 when a garage was knocked down for lacking a permit. An order to desist from all building was given in 1993, and since then demolition orders have been delivered on several homes. Nidal Darawi, a schoolteacher, married and added a kitchen to their home in 2005. Border police noticed the change, and their home was demolished. His brother exclaimed to a reporter: "This is a threat to Israel? This was his blood and the blood of his children -- all of his savings." Two houses were demolished on 31 December 2005. One, owned by Nidal Ahmad al-Dir'awi, a teacher by profession, had lacked a permit and he agreed to pay a fine of $12,000 in 2000 as a preliminary to obtaining one. It had cost him $30,000 to build. Siham Shawara (from al-Khas) married a man from Nuaman in 2002, and they, and their three young children, had their home demolished in 2010. Siham, who managed to graduate from Bethlehem University in Chemistry, recalls that a soldier on checkpoint duty once ripped up her chemistry textbook after deciding it would have been used for terroristic purposes. The family is now housed in a converted stable. By 2012, Israel had demolished 5 homes in Nuaman.

== Legal measures ==
The High Court judgement giving the Israeli authorities 60 days to clarify the status of the village in the 1990s was never acted on. In response to a further petition in 2004 regarding the routing of the West Bank Barrier and a request the villagers be permitted access to Bethlehem, and a permit to stay in their village, the court ruled on 30 June 2004 that it was forbidden to arrest residents as being illegally present in Israel. An agreement drawn up by their lawyer, Shlomo Lacker, with the Israeli authorities was endorsed by the court on 22 March 2005, and gave them unimpeded access to the West Bank by law. The authorities also undertook not to hamper the routines of normal life in Nuaman. This agreement also foresaw the creation of a body of Israeli appointees to determine who could and could not reside in the hamlet. The villagers however stated that they had not consented to this agreement, and that in any case the authorities were in breach of its provisions. In 2009 the villagers of Nuaman had made two petitions to the Israeli Supreme Court requesting that the matter be resolved by either recognizing the village as an integral part of the West Bank, or by conceding its residents the status of residents of Jerusalem.

== Incidents ==
In early 2003, Dvir Kahana, an Israeli working for a private company, turned up in Nuaman passing himself off as a representative of the Israeli government, for which his company was a subcontractor. He said that due to measures of closure they would soon find themselves like 'a tree without water', and therefore suggested that they sell their lands to him. The residents rebuffed the proposal adamantly.

In December 2005 a labourer from Nuaman, Mahmoud Shawara (43), father of 9 children, living in a roofless structure lacking an Israeli building permit, set out on his mule to look for work in Umm Tuba which is designated as lying within Jerusalem's borders. He was arrested by Israel Border Police engaged in checking for illegal workers (shabahim) entering into Israel, but refused to be taken away by jeep since it would have meant abandoning his mule. Several hours later, the animal was seen dragging something at a gallop, and an Umm Tuba resident stopped it, and saw that an unconscious Shawara had had his hands roped to the mule, and was in a battered state. He stopped breathing, was revived, and taken to the Hadassah Medical Center and received in the intensive care ward where he died a week later. The cause of his death is unknown, and an Israeli police investigation closed the matter stating it was an accident caused by a fall from the mule. Nuaman residents stated that border police had a practice of tying illegals to their animals. Gideon Levy collected testimonies of several Palestinians regarding the practice, which involves placing a cinder block on the prone labourer, once tethered to an animal and then whipping it to drag the person away.

== Expulsion? ==
The confiscation order delivered on 2 September 2007, claiming a further 22 dunams of agricultural land, had a notification attached demanding that those living on the expropriated territory leave immediately.

From 1998 to 2003 Israel repeatedly closed the road linking the village to Bethlehem for periods of up to a month. In April/ May 2006, Israel locked the western entrance to the village, once used by villagers to go on foot to Al-Aqsa for prayers, by mounting a steel gate, and the road to Jerusalem has been partially destroyed by being ploughed over and blocked with dirt mounds. All transit through the village by vehicles other than personal cars is forbidden, including taxis and buses. A military checkpoint guards the other entrance, and no one other than Nuaman residents are permitted passage into the hamlet. Since May 2006, only Nu'man residents with West Bank IDs may enter the village, though even the resident doctor, Dr. Ibrahim Abu-Sitta al-Dir'awi, encounters delays and threats at the checkpoint to deny him entry to his home if he leaves the hamlet, and the new village lawyer, Labib Habib, who has an Israeli ID, is denied entry to consult with the villagers. Even the number of chickens one may carry back to one's home is subject to arbitrary rules, sometimes only one being allowed. An ambulance was refused entry when answering a call for help from the village and the child, bitten by a spider, had to be carried to the checkpoint to reach the ambulance and be taken to hospital.

Ibrahim Darawi imputes to the Israelis an intention to force them to leave, calling it 'a quiet transfer.' The villagers themselves are not permitted to truck in heavy supplies like flour, fodder and gas cylinders but are required by the Israeli military to carry them on foot through the checkpoint to their homes 1.5 kilometers away. The former UN Special Rapporteur Richard Falk has endorsed this description, calling the constrictive policies applied to the village an example of "indirect forcible transfer."

According to B'Tselem, behind the restrictions on Nuaman lie a government policy which aims to maintain the demographic balance of Jerusalem by encouraging refusing to allow Palestinians to exceed the ceiling of 30% of the city's population, with measures that include forced expulsions. Israeli officials deny there is any wish to expel the villagers. Lt. Col. Shlomo Dror that Nuaman's difficulties will eventually be smoothed out.

Some of them are not legally there, but we are not going to push anyone out. We'll find a solution for this problem. Maybe, one day, the fence will be in another place, or maybe that part of East Jerusalem will be part of the West Bank.

Al-Haq claims that what Israel is doing in Nuaman is in clear violation of the Fourth Geneva Convention, and International Humanitarian Law, the former prohibiting "individual or mass forcible transfers".

== Sources ==
- ARIJ (2010). "Al Khas & An Nu'man Village Profile" (PDF). OCHA.
- Careccia, Grazia; Reynolds, John J. (November 2006). "Numan Village - a case study of indirect forcible transfer" (PDF). Al-Haq. pp. 1–48. Archived from the original (PDF) on 19 April 2016.
- Davis, Brandon (6 July 2012). "Neither in nor out: Jerusalem village on the seam". Ma'an News Agency.
- Falk, Richard (13 January 2014). "Special Rapporteur Human rights situation in Palestine and other occupied Arab territories" (DOC). United Nations General Assembly. p. 7.
- Grey, Mary C.. (2011). The Advent of Peace: A Gospel journey to Christmas. SPCK. ISBN 978-028106562-2.
- Jaradat, Zahi (12 April 2003). "Al-Numan: Encircled by the Wall". Al-Haq. Archived from the original on 5 January 2016.
- Levy, Gideon (23 December 2005). "Twillight Zone: Dusty Trail to Death". Ha'aretz. Archived from the original on 19 June 2006.
- McCarthy, Rory (6 May 2009). "Life in Nu'man land". The Guardian.
- "Nu'man, East Jerusalem - Life under the Threat of Expulsion". B'Tselem. September 2003.
- PLO (December 2013). "From Hallowed Grotto to Israeli-Imposed Ghetto; THE GOVERNORATE OF BETHLEHEM in 2013" (PDF). PLO negotiations affairs department.
- Prusher, Ilene R. (19 December 2006). "The new walls of Jerusalem: Part 1 • The Arabs on the outside". The Christian Science Monitor.
- Thomas, John H. (8 December 2005). "Reports from Israel-Palestine: Breaking Down Dividing Walls: Next Year in Jerusalem?". United Church of Christ. Global Ministries.
- Wilson, Scott (30 May 2006). "In the Village of Nowhere, a Fate Soon Sealed". The Washington Post. pp. 1–5.
