= Beit Ta'mir =

West Bank village in the Bethlehem Governate

- Municipality type D (Village council)

Arabic transcription(s)
  - Arabic: خربة بيت تعمر
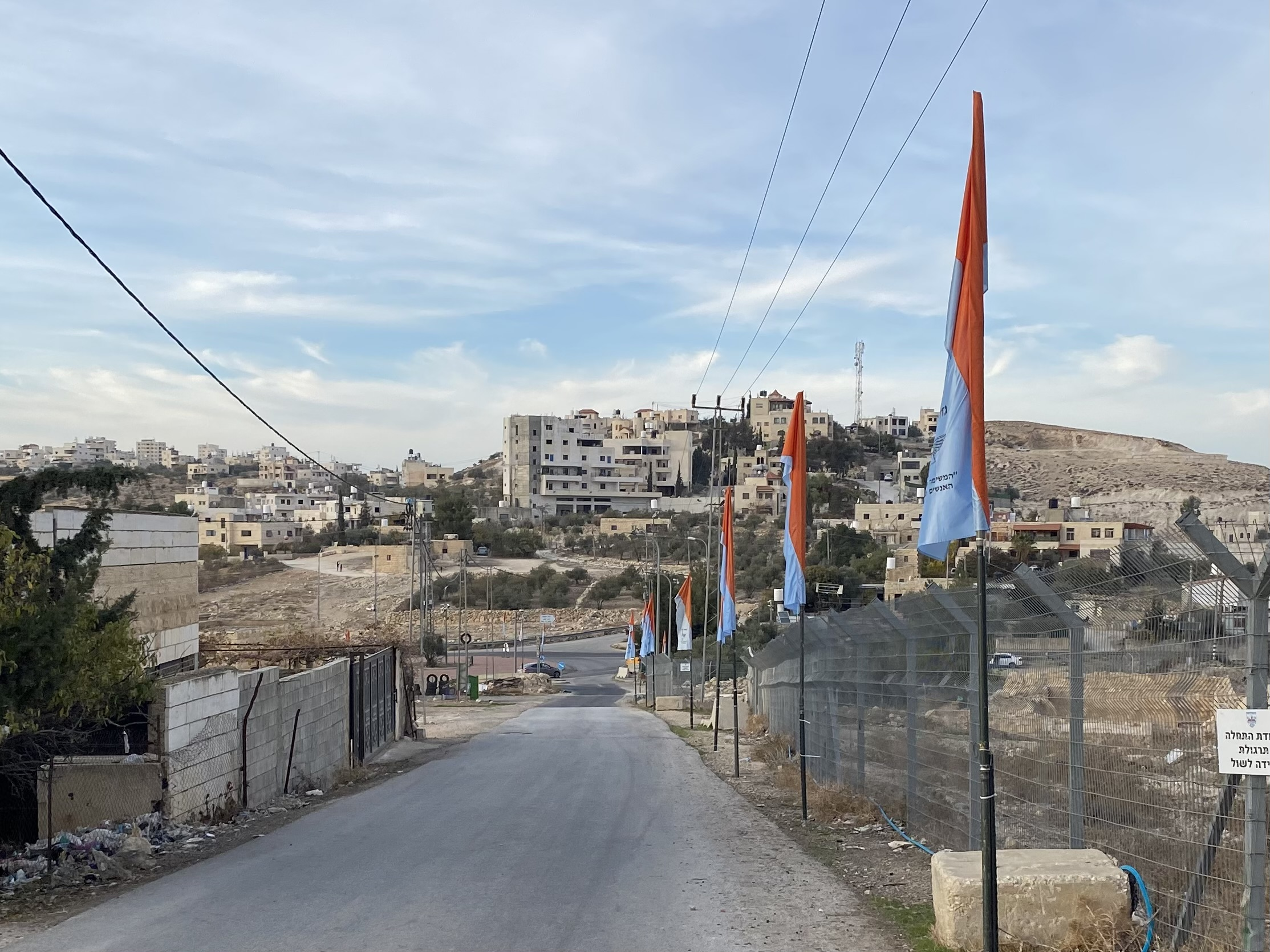

- Location of Beit Ta'mir within Palestine Location of Beit Ta'mir within the West Bank
- Coordinates: 31°40′40″N 35°14′23″E
- Palestine grid: 172/120
- State: State of Palestine
- Governorate: Bethlehem

Government
  - Type: Village council

Population (2017)
  - Total: 1,596
- Name meaning: The house of the T'amirah Arabs

Beit Ta'mir (Arabic: خربة بيت تعمر) is a Palestinian village located six kilometers southeast of Bethlehem.The town is in the Bethlehem Governorate central West Bank. According to the Palestinian Central Bureau of Statistics, the village had a population of 1,596 in 2017.

The village is home to the 'Arab al-Ta'mira Bedouin tribe of the Bethlehem area, and along with Za'atara, Hindaza, Tuqu', Khirbet al-Deir (today part of Tuqu'), Nuaman, Ubeidiya and al-Asakra forms the 'Arab al-Ta'mira village cluster.

== Location ==
Beit Ta’mir is located 4 kilometers (2.5 mi) south-east of the centre of Bethlehem and 1.5 kilometers (0.93 mi) north of the Herodian on a fertile soil with many olive trees. Other Palestinian villages in its immediate vicinity include Za'atara to the east, Hindaza to the west and north, and Jannatah and Tuqu' to the south. The old village main street, known as Qubara Street, is a route that connects Rachel's Tomb to Ein Jidi, and was traditionally regularly traversed, but the Israeli occupation today prohibits Palestinians from using that route.

== History ==
The village's existence seems to have gone unmentioned in written sources until the 16th century. An archaeological survey and brief excavation conducted in 2014 found evidence of continuous habitation from the Roman period uninterrupted through to the present day. Several Byzantine and Umayyad era coins (fils) marked with a "K", and Arabic inscriptions respectively were found, along with pottery shards from these two periods, as well as from the Abbasid, Ayyubid, Mamluk and Ottoman eras.

=== Roman-Byzantine era ===
Six rock-hewn Roman-Byzantine era tombs have been identified in the vicinity around the mosque, two of which were reused by the villagers to bury children. There are also 30 cisterns for collecting rainwater, some of which date back to this period. Two wine-presses, one foot treading and one wooden beam press, also date back to this period, and the wooden press may even date back further to the Hellenistic period.

In a cave 40 metres (44 yd) south of the village mosque, there are niches in the back wall resembling burial spaces, indicating it was possibly used a tomb in the Roman period. A structure composed of two rooms was built over the cave and used in the Ottoman period to store olives. From the smaller room a Byzantine era rock hewn shaft leads down to the cave, a type of construction seen in other villages to send olives to the crushing room for an olive press, and there is evidence for use of the cave in this manner through several subsequent periods.

=== Umayyad era ===
The village mosque, the Mosque of Omar (Jami'a 'Amar Ibn Khuttab) has been tentatively dated to 636 CE. No exact date has been set by archaeologists but there is general agreement that it dates to the early Islamic period, based on structural elements, an inscription, its name, and resemblance to another similar mosque in Artas, Bethlehem. Tradition holds that the mosque was built and named in honor of the caliph Umar bin Khattab who is said to have prayed at the site where the mosque was built when he traveled through the village on his way to Jerusalem during the Islamic conquest. The name of the village is also traced by tradition to this historical event.

The original structure of the mosque was constructed using local limestone and it sit on ruins from the Byzantine era that may have belonged to church, based on the east-west orientation of the axis and the retrieval of several artifacts such as a Byzantine era coin and cross. There is an old cistern in the courtyard that could be early Islamic or Byzantine. The muezzin is a modern addition constructed adjacent to the original structure.

This mosque, like that of many others in Palestinian villages, was also used traditionally to store people's personal belongings, and village lore recounts the story of a man who came in with some bread he was eating and tried to take some of olive oil stored in bottles there. When he rose to leave with the goods, he lost his eyesight and could not find the way out. When he repented and returned the ill-gotten goods, the door of the mosque opened to let him out. Such stories associated with holy shrines (maqamat) and saints in Palestinian culture were well documented by Tawfiq Canaan.

=== Ottoman era ===
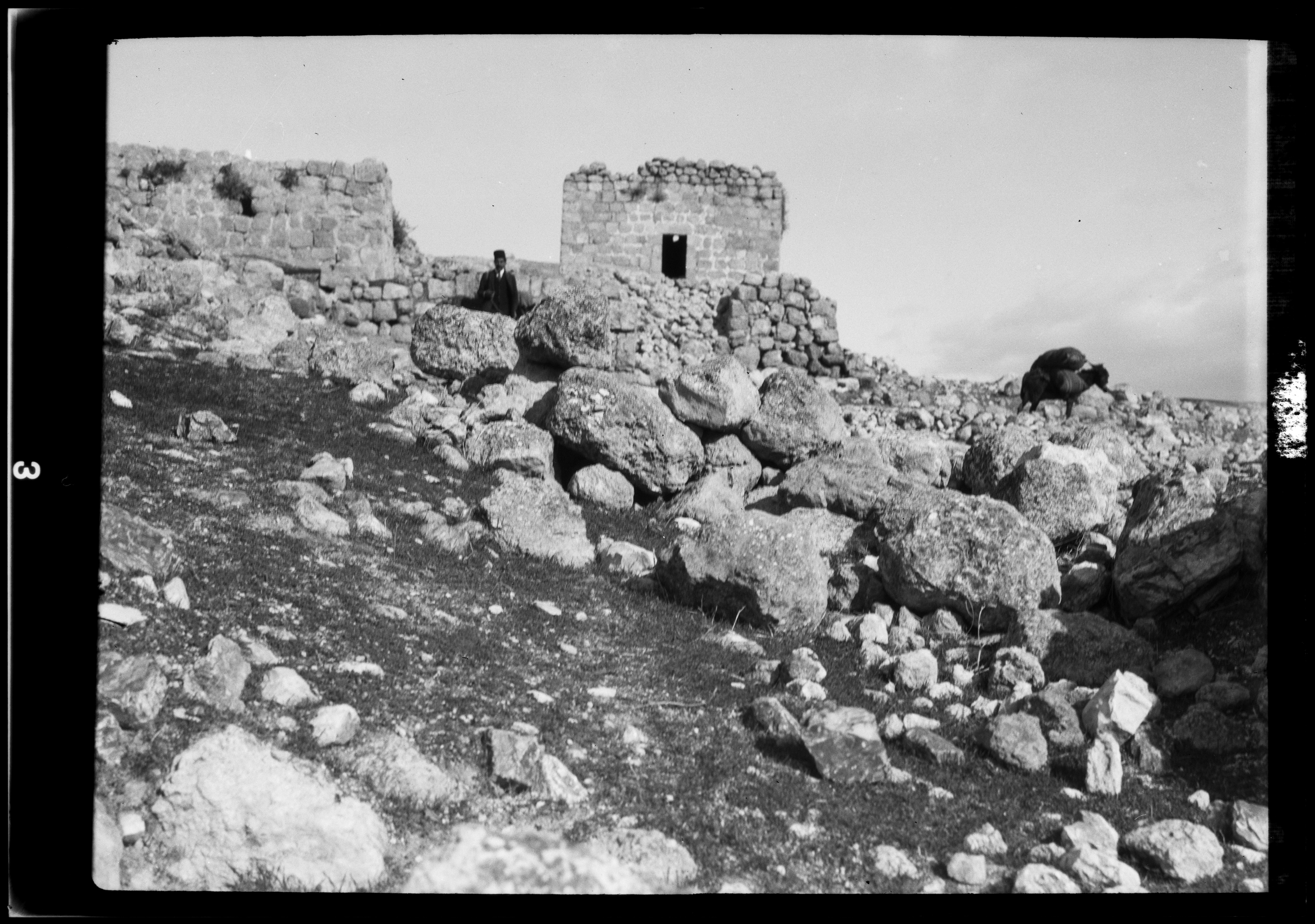
View of structures in the village with a man and a donkey from the photographs taken by Frank Scholten ca 1922

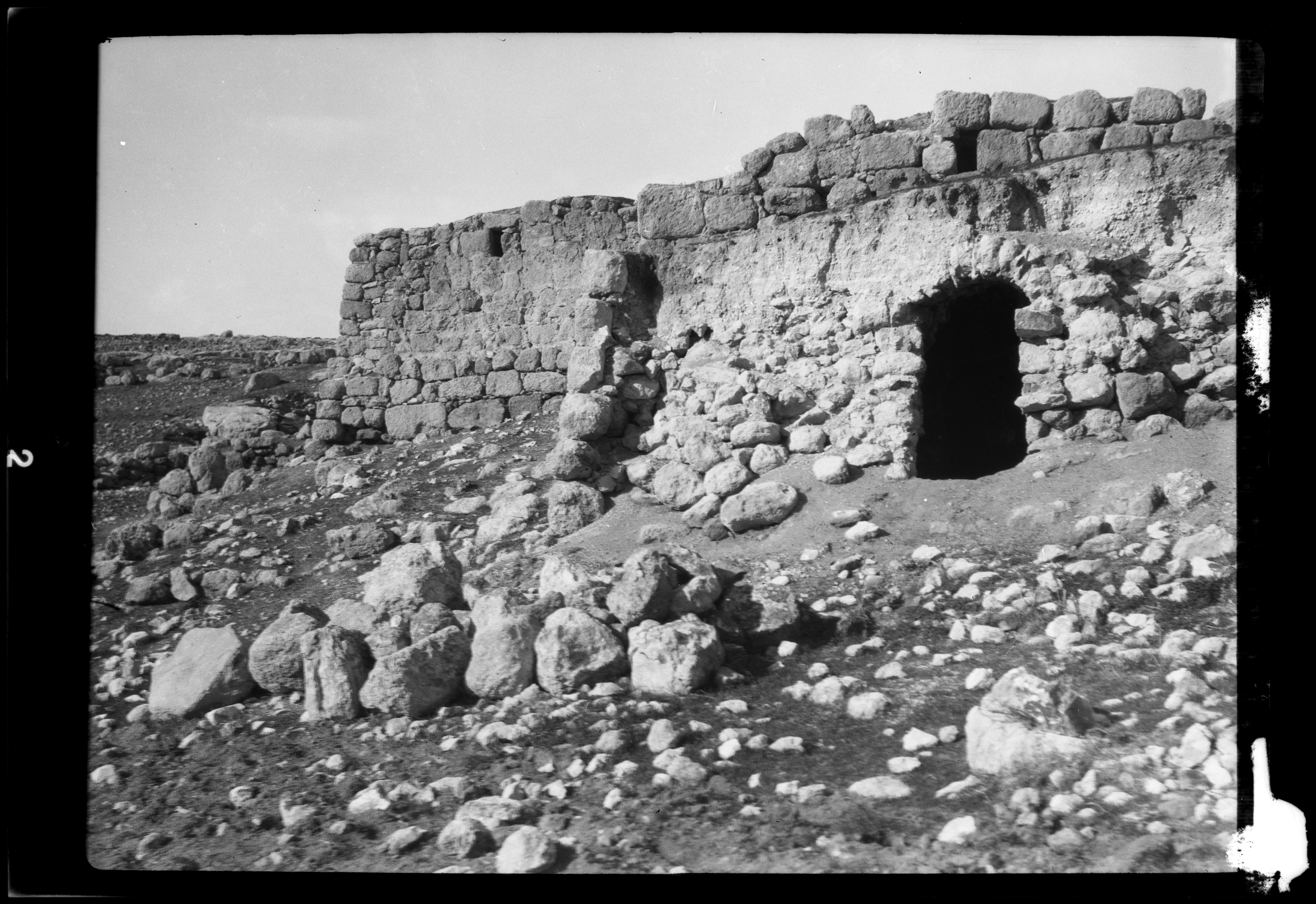
Photographs by Frank Scholten, ca 1922, of dwellings in Beit Ta'mir, titled "Bedouin houses" by Leiden Library staff

Beit Ta'mir was incorporated into the Ottoman Empire in 1517 with all of Palestine.

In 1531, records from the Jerusalem Sharia Court mention an individual named 'Ali al-Ta'amari of the Ta'amreh tribe. This record places the Ta'amreh in the vicinity of Bethlehem, marking their involvement in legal matters during the early Ottoman period. In 1603/4 a Bedouin named Sha‘ala of ‘Arab al-Ta‘āmira sold a beast of burden, originally stolen from Jindas near Lydda to Sālim b. Ghunaym, resident of the village of Dayr al-Sinna in the Kidron Valley near Jerusalem. These mentions highlight the Ta'amreh's active role within the social and judicial landscape of the region in the 16th and 17th centuries.

In 1596 Beit Ta'mir appeared in the tax registers as being in the nahiya of Al-Quds in the liwa of Al-Quds under the name of Bayt Ta'mar. It had a population of 65 household; who were all Muslims. They paid a fixed tax-rate of 33.3% on agricultural products, including wheat, barley, vegetable and fruit gardens, goats and beehives, in addition to occasional revenues; a total of 8,100 Akçe. Half of the revenue went to a Waqf.

In 1838, Edward Robinson noted Beit Ta'mar, the village of the Ta'amirah, on his travels in the region, It was also noted as an Arab village, located south of Wadi er-Rahib in the Jerusalem district.

In 1863, Victor Guérin noted it as an ancient site, inhabited by people of the Ta'amereh tribe.

An Ottoman list from about 1870 notes a "sizable" village with a mosque with a small minaret. The villagers were Bedouin.

In 1883 the PEF's Survey of Western Palestine (SWP) described Beit T'amir: "a small village on a hill with wells and a few olives. The name is that of an Arab tribe which was originally settled in the place. The village contains a small mosque named after the Khalif Omar."

In 1896 a population list noted that Beit Ta'mir was "half Bedouin".

=== British Mandate era ===
In the 1945 statistics the population was counted under the name Arab et Ta'amira together with Arab Ibn Ubeid, Arab et Rashayida and Arab et Sawahira; together they had a population of 7,070 Muslims, with Arab et Ta'amira having a total of 209,888 dunams of land according to an official land and population survey. Of this, 24 dunams were used plantations and irrigable land, 12,424 for cereals, while 197,440 dunams were classified as non-cultitivable land.

=== Jordanian era ===
In the wake of the 1948 Arab–Israeli War, and after the 1949 Armistice Agreements, Beit Ta’mir came under Jordanian rule.

In 1961, the population of Ta'amira inhabiting the desert of their lands as Nomads (as indicated by the Arabic section of the Jordanian Census, "عرب التعامرة") was 306, excluding other Ta'amira populations such as Za'atara (1,003), Tuqu' (555), and other Ta'amira villages, which would number their total population in thousands.

=== Post 1967 ===
Since the Six-Day War in 1967, Beit Ta'mir has been held under Israeli occupation.

After the 1995 accords, 34.5% of village land was classified as Area A land, 56.2% as Area B, and the remaining 9.3% as Area C.

== Bibliography ==
- Abuaemer, Ibrahim Mohammed (September 2020). "Khirbet Beit Ta'mar: An Archaeological, Historical and Architectural Study". OUSSOUR: Al Jadida Revue. 10 (3).
- Conder, C.R.; Kitchener, H.H. (1883). The Survey of Western Palestine: Memoirs of the Topography, Orography, Hydrography, and Archaeology. Vol. 3. London: Committee of the Palestine Exploration Fund.
- Government of Jordan, Department of Statistics (1964). First Census of Population and Housing. Volume I: Final Tables; General Characteristics of the Population (PDF).
- Government of Palestine, Department of Statistics (1945). Village Statistics, April, 1945.
- Guérin, V. (1869). Description Géographique Historique et Archéologique de la Palestine (in French). Vol. 1: Judee, pt. 3. Paris: L'Imprimerie Nationale.
- Hadawi, S. (1970). Village Statistics of 1945: A Classification of Land and Area ownership in Palestine. Palestine Liberation Organization Research Centre.
- Hütteroth, W.-D.; Abdulfattah, K. (1977). Historical Geography of Palestine, Transjordan and Southern Syria in the Late 16th Century. Erlanger Geographische Arbeiten, Sonderband 5. Erlangen, Germany: Vorstand der Fränkischen Geographischen Gesellschaft. ISBN 3-920405-41-2.
- Kitchener, H.H. (1877). "Lieutenant Kitchener's Report". Quarterly Statement - Palestine Exploration Fund. 9: 165–178. doi:10.1179/peq.1877.9.4.165.
- Marom, Roy (2022). "Jindās: A History of Lydda's Rural Hinterland in the 15th to the 20th Centuries CE". Lod, Lydda, Diospolis. 1: 1–31.
- Palmer, E.H. (1881). The Survey of Western Palestine: Arabic and English Name Lists Collected During the Survey by Lieutenants Conder and Kitchener, R. E. Transliterated and Explained by E.H. Palmer. Committee of the Palestine Exploration Fund.
- Robinson, E.; Smith, E. (1841). Biblical Researches in Palestine, Mount Sinai and Arabia Petraea: A Journal of Travels in the year 1838. Vol. 2. Boston: Crocker & Brewster.
- Robinson, E.; Smith, E. (1841). Biblical Researches in Palestine, Mount Sinai and Arabia Petraea: A Journal of Travels in the year 1838. Vol. 3. Boston: Crocker & Brewster.
- Schick, C. (1896). "Zur Einwohnerzahl des Bezirks Jerusalem". Zeitschrift des Deutschen Palästina-Vereins. 19: 120–127.
- Socin, A. (1879). "Alphabetisches Verzeichniss von Ortschaften des Paschalik Jerusalem". Zeitschrift des Deutschen Palästina-Vereins. 2: 135–163.
