= Ash-Shawawra =

Village in West Bank, Palestine

Ashawawra
- Municipality type C

Arabic transcription(s)
- Location of ash Shawawra within Palestine
- Coordinates: 31°41′28″N 35°16′20″E
- State: State of Palestine
- Governorate: Bethlehem

Government
  - Type: Municipality

Population (2017)
  - Total: 4,161

Ashawawra (Arabic: الشواورة) is a Palestinian village located twelve kilometers southeast of Bethlehem. The village is in the Bethlehem Governorate central West Bank.

== History ==
=== Modern era ===
Since the Six-Day War in 1967, Ash-Shawawra has been under Israeli occupation.

After the 1995 accords, 52.2% of Ash-Shawawra land is defined as Area A land, 6% is Area B, 14.6% is defined as Area C, while the remaining 27.2% is defined a nature reserves.

According to the Palestinian Central Bureau of Statistics, the town had a population of over 4,161 in 2017. The primary healthcare is obtained in Za'atara, where the Ministry of Health denotes the healthcare facilities as level 3.
