= Jannatah =

- Municipality type C

Arabic transcription(s)
  - Arabic: جناتة
  - Latin: Janata (official)
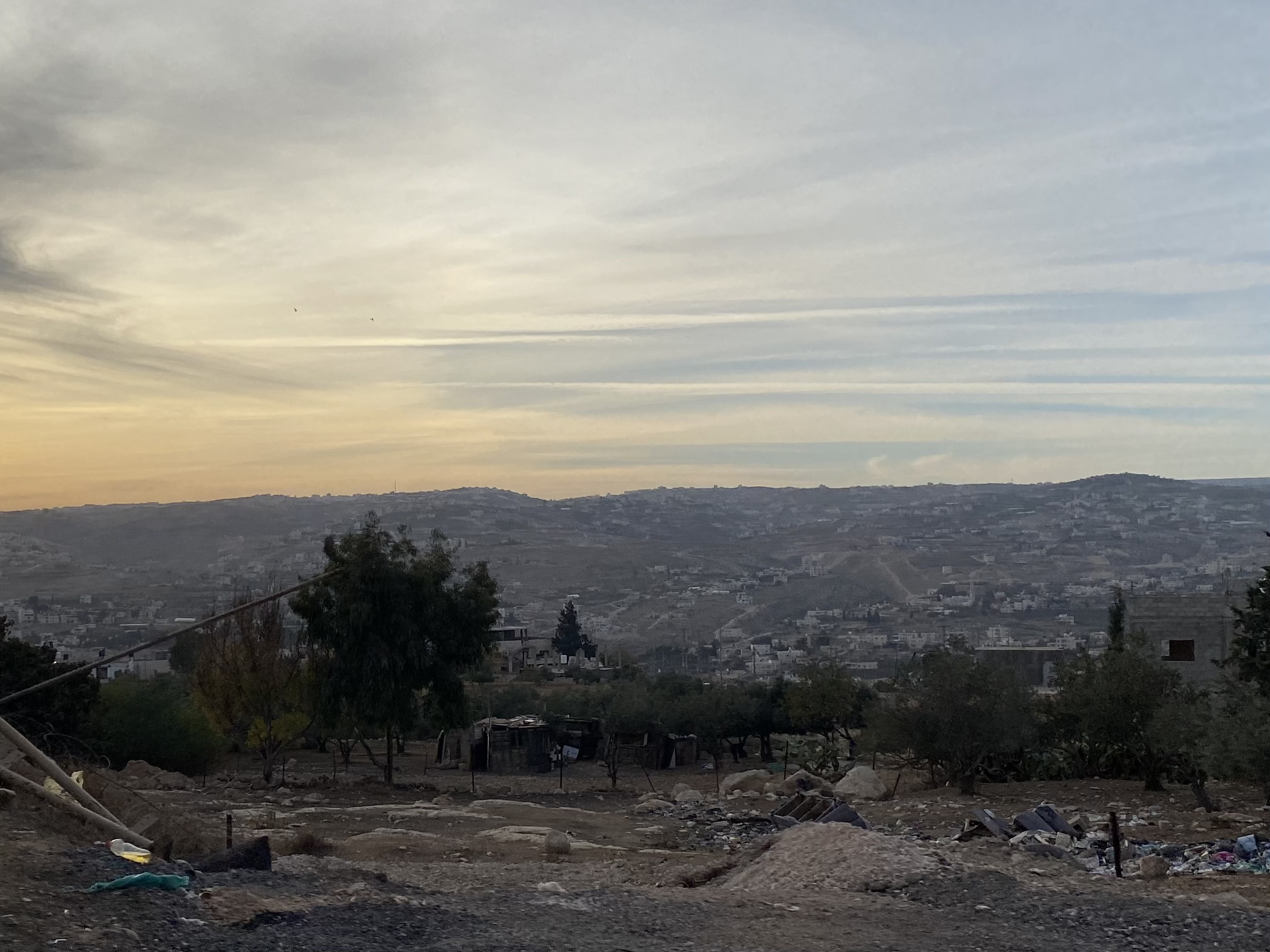

- Location of Jannatah within Palestine
- Coordinates: 31°40′9″N 35°13′11″E
- State: State of Palestine
- Governorate: Bethlehem

Government
  - Type: Municipality (from 1996)
  - Head of Municipality: Mustafa Urooj

Area
  - Total: 11.9 km^{2} (4.6 sq mi)

Population (2017)
  - Total: 7,336
  - Density: 616/km^{2} (1,600/sq mi)
- Name meaning: "Paradise"

Jannatah (Arabic: جناتة) is a Palestinian town in the central West Bank 5 kilometers (3.1 mi) south of Bethlehem in the Bethlehem Governorate. Nearby villages include Hindaza in the north and Tuqu' to the south. It is situated 570 meters (1,870 ft) above sea level. The total land area is 11,901 dunams of which 319 constitute built-up area and 277 have been confiscated by the Israeli government for settlements and a military base. Much of the remainder is used for arable land.

== History ==
In the wake of the 1948 Arab–Israeli War, and after the 1949 Armistice Agreements, Jannatah came under Jordanian rule.

Since the Six-Day War in 1967, Jannatah has been held under Israeli occupation.

According to ARIJ, Israel has confiscated land from Jannatah to construct two Israeli settlements; 409 dunams of land in 1982 for Nokdim and 222 dunams in 1999 for El David.

After the 1995 accords, 9.4% of the Jannatah's land was classified as Area A, 28.5% as Area B, 54% as Area C, while the remaining 8.1% was classified as "nature reserves".

Jannatah is named after Wadi al-Jana'en or "Valley of Gardens," the name of the area where the town is located. Jannatah was formed by the Palestinian National Authority (PNA) in 1996 with the merger of the villages of al-Iqab, Rakhme, al-Asakra, Khallet al-Karaneen, Harmala and Abu Nujeim in order to ease the provision of government services and planning for the communities. Since then the town has been governed by a municipality consisting of eleven members appointed by the PNA. The current mayor is Mustafa Urooj and his deputy is Ibrahim Abakreh. There are six mosques and five public schools in Jannatah.

On 28 August 2001, during the Second Intifada, ARIJ reported the Israeli Army raided Abu Nujeim, destroyed its water network, uprooted 20 of its olive trees and damaged part of the Abu Nujeim School. That same day, ARIJ reported Israeli soldiers had fired at a livestock pen, killing 15 sheep.

In the 2007 census by the Palestinian Central Bureau of Statistics (PCBS), Jannatah had a population of 5,416, or 860 households. The principal families are al-'Asakra, az-Zeer, al-Mu'ti, al-Urooj, al-Hreimi, Shawriya, Salahat and at-Tinih. About 60% of the town's labor force work in agriculture, 15% as civil servants and the remainder in the Israeli labor market and trade, service and industry sectors. By 2017, the population was 7,336.
