= Al-Asakra =

al-Asakra
- Municipality type D (Village council)

Arabic transcription(s)
  - Arabic: العساكرة
  - Latin: al-Asakira (official) al-Asakreh (unofficial)
- Location of al-Asakra within Palestine
- Coordinates: 31°40′18″N 35°13′35″E
- State: State of Palestine
- Governorate: Bethlehem

Government
  - Type: Village council

Area
  - Total: 2.1 km^{2} (0.81 sq mi)

Population (2006)
  - Total: 1,001
  - Density: 480/km^{2} (1,200/sq mi)

Al-Asakra (Arabic: العساكرة) is a Palestinian village in the Bethlehem Governorate in the south-central West Bank, located 4.5 kilometers southeast of Bethlehem. It is a part of the Jannatah municipality. According to the Palestinian Central Bureau of Statistics, the village had a population of over 1,001 inhabitants in mid-year 2006.

Al-Asakra has a land area of 2,116 dunams and is a part of the larger Arab al-Ta'amira village cluster, lies between the towns of Tuqu' and Za'atara covering an area of 217,236 dunams (21 km^{2}). Agriculture is the main economic activity of the region, which is located in Area 'C' and falls under the control of the Israel civil administration.

Settled relatively recently by the at-Ta'mira Bedouin tribe, it is part of the 'Arab al-Ta'mira village cluster, along with Za'atara, Beit Ta'mir, Hindaza, Tuqu', Khirbet ad-Deir (today part of Tuqu'), Nuaman and Ubeidiya.
