= Al-Masara =

- Local Development Committee

Arabic transcription(s)
  - Arabic: المعصرة
  - Latin: Al-Ma'sara (official)
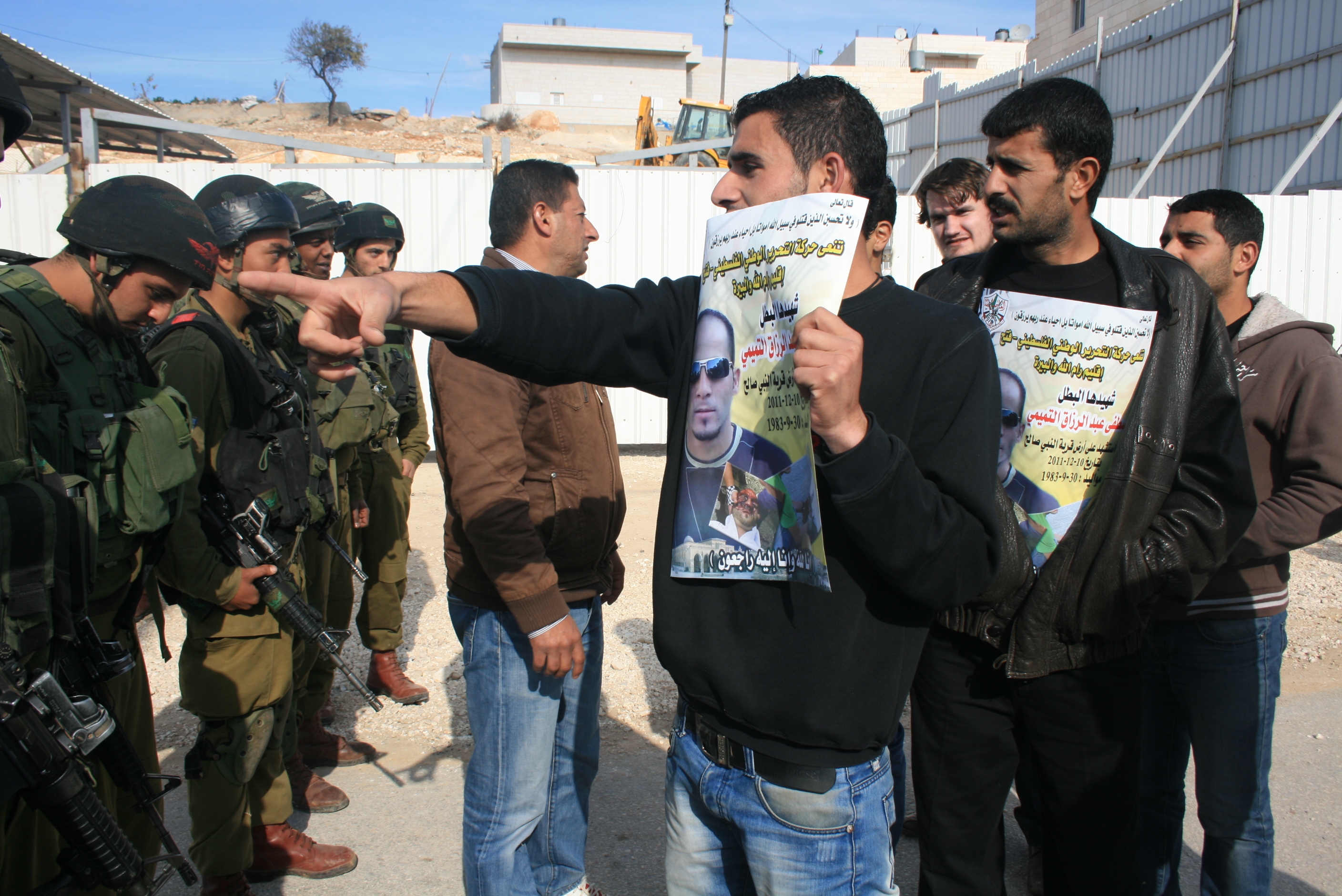
- Protest in al-Masara
- Interactive map of Al-Masara
- Coordinates: 31°39′17″N 35°10′48″E
- State: State of Palestine
- Governorate: Bethlehem
- Founded: 1930

Government
  - Type: Local Development Committee
  - Head of Municipality: Mahmoud Alaeddin

Area
  - Total: 1.0 km^{2} (0.39 sq mi)

Population (2017)
  - Total: 1,085
  - Density: 1,100/km^{2} (2,800/sq mi)
- Name meaning: "the press"

Al-Masara (Arabic: المعصرة, pronounced al-Ma'sara; translation: "the press") is a Palestinian village in the central West Bank, 6.2 km southwest of Bethlehem, part of the Bethlehem Governorate. It is surrounded by a number of smaller Palestinian villages, including Khallet al-Haddad to the east. The population was 1,085 in the 2017 census by the Palestinian Central Bureau of Statistics (PCBS).

== History ==
=== Name. Archaeology ===
Its name, which translates as "the press", derives from the Byzantine Empire-era olive press still located in al-Ma'sara. In 1883 the PEF's Survey of Western Palestine (SWP) noted "heaps of stones and cisterns" at Khurbet Marsia.

=== Establishment (1930) ===
The modern town was founded in 1930 by members of the Arab al-Zawahra and at-Ta'mirah tribes.

=== Post-1967 ===
After the Six-Day War in 1967, Al-Masara has been under Israeli occupation.

== Institutions ==
A seven-member local development committee was established by the Palestinian National Authority (PNA) to administer the village, most which is located in Area B giving the PNA jurisdiction over al-Ma'sara's civil affairs. The head of the committee is Mahmoud Alaeddin.

There is one mosque, al-Ma'sara Mosque, and a primary and secondary school in the village.

== Economy ==
Agriculture accounts for 70% of al-Ma'sara's economic activity, while the civil sector makes up 16%. The total land area is 973 dunams, of which 42 dunams are designated built-up. Most of the remainder is arable land, 505 dunams of which are cultivated.
