= Ilene Prusher =

American journalist and novelist

- Born: 5 June 1970 (age 56)
- Education: Columbia University Graduate School of Journalism
- Occupations: Journalist, novelist
- Children: 2

Ilene Prusher (born 5 June 1970) is an American journalist and novelist.

== Personal life ==
Raised in New York, Prusher graduated from the Columbia University Graduate School of Journalism in 1993. She now resides in West Palm Beach, Florida, where she lectures on journalism for Florida Atlantic University's School of Communication & Multimedia Studies.

== Career ==
=== Media ===
Prusher started her career as a reporter at The Philadelphia Inquirer. Later, she freelanced from the Middle East for Newsday, The New Republic, The Financial Times, The Guardian, and The Observer (UK). Her book reviews and essays were published in The Washington Post, Haaretz Books, Moment, Habitus, Zeek, and Tikkun.

Prusher was a staff writer for The Christian Science Monitor from 2000 to 2010, serving as the Boston-based newspaper’s bureau chief in Tokyo, Istanbul, and Jerusalem and covering the wars in Iraq and Afghanistan. In 2011-12 she was the deputy editor of The Jerusalem Report. She is now on the editorial staff of Haaretz, where she writes a blog called Jerusalem Vivendi. She also teaches Reporting Conflict for NYU-Tel Aviv, runs creative writing workshops, and writes Primigravida, a blog about motherhood.

As part of her coverage of the major stories of the past decade in Afghanistan, Iraq, and Israel/Palestine, Prusher has been interviewed on CNN, MSNBC, C-SPAN, and NPR. Her coverage of Al-Qaeda’s escape from the American military in Afghanistan was cited in the 9/11 anniversary issue of The New Yorker. An excerpt of her novel was read on the BBC World Service's “Weekend” Program in November 2012, and she was featured on the “Woman's Hour” program of BBC Radio 4.

She now hosts a weekly radio show on TLV1 Radio, Weekend Edition.

=== Literary work ===
Her first novel, Baghdad Fixer, was published in November 2012 by Halban Publishers in London, which The Guardian called “a gripping debut." The story follows Nabil al-Amari, an English teacher living in Baghdad in Saddam’s Iraq, when a chance encounter with Samara Katchens, an American journalist covering the war, changes his life forever. It is April 2003 and American and British forces have recently invaded Iraq.

Bagdhad Fixer was published in the United States on 1 November 2014.

Works of short fiction have been published in Zeek (2009), and Mima'amakim (2010).

Short collection of haiku have been published in an anthology entitled Multi Culti Mixterations: Playful and Profound Interpretations of Culture Through Haiku (2010).

== Awards and honours ==
In 2005, Prusher was nominated by The Christian Science Monitor for a Pulitzer Prize for "What's a Kidney Worth," an investigative story on organ trafficking.

In December 2005, she won the Christian Science Monitor Award of Excellence for coverage of the Israeli disengagement from Gaza.

In 1998, she won the United Nations Correspondents Association (UNCA) Journalists' Award Honorable Mention for her reporting on post-war Somalia.

== Media appearances and citations ==
Prusher was a guest on CNN's "Foreign Correspondents with Christiane Amanpour," news programs on MSNBC, Fox News, The NewsHour with Jim Lehrer, and C-SPAN's Washington Journal.

Prusher’s in-depth coverage of the Al-Qaeda leadership's escape from Afghanistan was cited in The New Yorker.
