= Ubeidiya, West Bank =

Palestinian town on the West Bank

Al-'Ubeidiya
- Municipality type C

Arabic transcription(s)
  - Arabic: العبيدية
  - Latin: al-Obaidya (official)
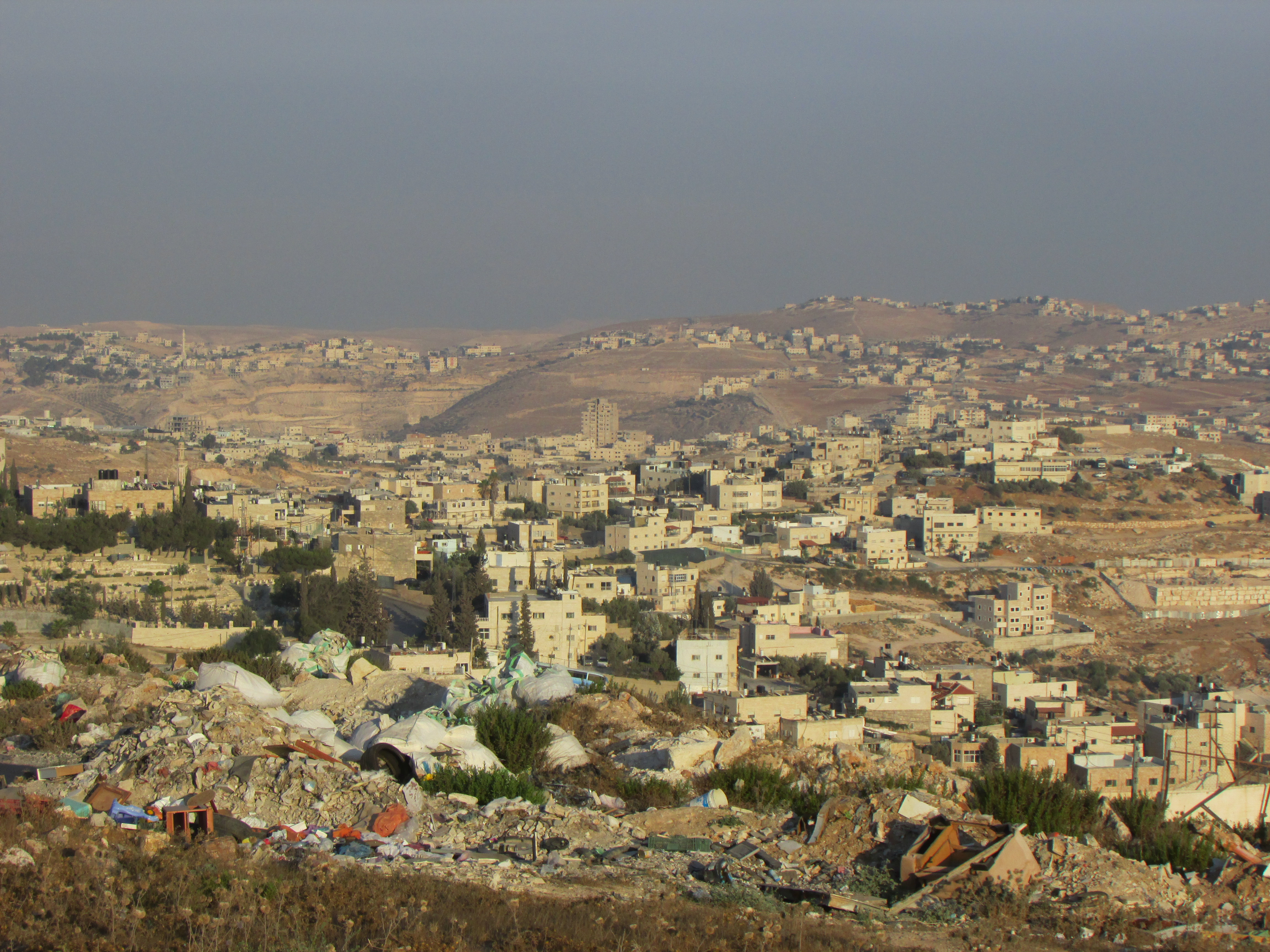

- Location of al 'Ubeidiya within Palestine Location of al 'Ubeidiya within the West Bank
- Coordinates: 31°43′24″N 35°17′26″E
- Palestine grid: 177/125
- State: State of Palestine
- Governorate: Bethlehem

Government
  - Type: Municipality

Area
  - Total: 97.2 km^{2} (37.5 sq mi)

Population (2017)
  - Total: 14,460
  - Density: 149/km^{2} (385/sq mi)
- Name meaning: 1881: Kh. Deir Ibn Obeid, meaning "The ruin of the monastery of the son of Obeid; also called Mar Theodosius

Al-Ubeidiya (Arabic: العبيدية) is a Palestinian town located 6 kilometers (3.7 mi) east of Bethlehem, in the Bethlehem Governorate of the State of Palestine, in the central West Bank. According to the Palestinian Central Bureau of Statistics (PCBS), al-Ubeidiya had a population of over 14,460 in 2017.

The Monastery of St. Theodosius, the Mar Saba Monastery and the 'Ayn Fashkhah tourist area are all on Al-Ubeidiya land.

Ubeidiya is considered as part of the 'Arab al-Ta'mira village cluster, along with Za'atara, Beit Ta'mir, Hindaza, Tuqu', Khirbet ad-Deir (today part of Tuqu'), Nuaman and al-Asakra.

== Name ==
In 1881, Palmer called the place Khurbet Deir Ibn 'Obeid, meaning "The ruin of the monastery of the son of Obeid; also called Mar Theodosius."

According to the Applied Research Institute–Jerusalem (ARIJ), Al-Ubeidiya was settled in 1600 by people originating from the Arabian Peninsula, and is named after a certain Al-‘Ubeidi Faris of the Shammar tribe, who came from the Arabian Peninsula.

== History and archaeology ==
=== Background: Roman and Byzantine periods ===
A Roman period pool, built in order to collect water, is situated in the center of al-Ubeidiya.

Two Greek Orthodox monasteries were first established during the Byzantine period in the late fifth century, and are now standing within the municipal jurisdiction of Ubeidiya. The Monastery of St. Theodosius, known in Arabic as Deir Ibn 'Ubeid (lit. 'Monastery of the Son of 'Ubeid') or as Mar Dosi ('Saint Theodosius'), named after its founder; and Mar Saba Monastery, or simply Mar Saba, founded and named after Saint Sabbas ('Mar Saba').

=== Ottoman period: Ubeidiya ===
ARIJ states that Ubeidiya was settled in 1600 by people originating from the Arabian Peninsula, its name evoking a certain Al-‘Ubeidi Faris of the Shammar tribe who came from Arabia.

The area, like the rest of Palestine, was incorporated into the Ottoman Empire in 1517. In 1596 Al-Ubeidiya appeared in Ottoman tax registers, called Dayr Bani 'Ubayd (lit. 'Monastery of the 'Ubayd clan'), being in the nahiya of Al-Quds (Jerusalem) in the liwa of Al-Quds. It had a population of 42 households and 6 bachelors, all Muslim. They paid a fixed tax-rate of 33,3 % on agricultural products, including wheat, barley, occasional revenues, goats and/or beehives; a total of 4,900 akçe.

Around 1740 Richard Pococke noted "We soon came to a ruin called Der Benalbede, which from the name seems to have been an old convent."

In 1838, Edward Robinson noted Deir ibn Obeid, not far from Mar Saba, on his travels in the region. He also met some of the fellahin from the village by the Dead Sea, where they collected salt for cooking.

In 1863, the French explorer Victor Guérin visited the place, which he called Deir Dosi, and described the remains of the monastery. In 1883, the PEF's "Survey of Western Palestine" described there Kh. Deir Ibn Obeid as "Ruins of a modern village", but in 1899 Conrad Schick noted that "This [...] designation is not sufficient -the ruins are not those of a village, but of a former convent, and only in modern times used as a storehouse for grain by the wandering tribe Ubedieh." Schick notes that the "Badawin" (Bedouin) of the Ubedieh call the convent ruins by the name of their own tribe, and have a nearby maqam by the name of Sheikh Khalife where they worship.

Schick notes that in 1897, the Greek Orthodox Church had recovered the ruins of the former convent of Saint Theodosius from the Bedouin, and by the following year had started with their project of erecting a new monastery there. The current compound was built mainly between 1914-1952.

=== British Mandate ===
In the 1922 census of Palestine, conducted by the British Mandate authorities, the tribal area of Ibaidiyeh had an all-Muslim population of 2,000, 880 males and 1,120 females. In the 1931 census the El Ubeidiya consisted of 1,187 persons, still all Muslim, 610 males and 577 females.

In the 1945 statistics, the population was counted under the name of tribal unit (arab) as Arab Ibn Ubeid, along with three other such units, Arab et Ta'amira, Arab et Rashayida and Arab et Sawahira; together they had a population of 7,070 Muslims, where Arab Ibn Ubeid had a total of 92,026 dunams of land, according to an official land and population survey. Of this, 3,732 dunams were used for cereals, while 88,294 dunams were classified as non-cultitivable land.

=== Jordanian period ===
In the wake of the 1948 Arab–Israeli War, and after the 1949 Armistice Agreements, Al-Ubeidiya came under Jordanian rule.

In 1961, the population of 'Ubeidiya was of 838.

=== 1967, aftermath ===
Since the Six-Day War in 1967, al-Ubeidiya has been under Israeli occupation. The population in the 1967 census conducted by the Israeli authorities was 1,377.

After the 1995 Oslo Accords, 9.1% of village land was classified as Area A, 0.4% as Area B, and the remainder 82% as Area C. Israel has confiscated land from Al-Ubeidiya in order to construct at least 2 Israeli settlements; 124 dunams for the settlement of Ovnat and 97 dunams for the nature reserve of ‘Ayn Fashkhah, both on the Dead Sea shore.

== Current state ==
=== Administration ===
Since 1997, al-Ubeidiya has been governed by an 11-member municipal council appointed by the Palestinian National Authority (PNA). The municipality has jurisdiction over 97,232 dunams of land—much larger than the built-up and residential areas of the town which constitute 979 of those dunams. Other localities located within the municipal borders include Wadi al-Arayis.

=== Religion ===
The population is Muslim, except for the monasteries, which are inhabited by Greek Orthodox monks. and there are ten mosques in the town.

=== Population structure (tribe, clans) ===
The name Al ‘Ubeidiya came in relation to a man called Al ‘Ubeidi Faris, who came from Shammar tribe, from the Arabian Peninsula. The main families being al-'Asa, al-Radayda, al-Rabai'a, al-Hasasna, and Abu Sirhan.

== Landmarks ==
=== Monastery of St. Theodosius ===
The Greek Orthodox Monastery of St. Theodosius stands on a hilltop on the road to Mar Saba, some 6 km from the eastern outskirts of Bethlehem. The once large fortified Byzantine monastery, which holds the tomb of its founder, Saint Theodosius the Cenobiarch (c. 423–529), has been rebuilt on a much smaller scale. Most of the current compound was erected between 1914-1952, incorporates Byzantine remains, and is centered on a small grotto, the "Cave of the Magi", where tradition has the three Magi stopping on their way home after having delivered gifts to the newborn Baby Jesus.

=== Mar Saba Monastery ===
The Mar Saba Monastery was founded by Saint Sabbas the Sanctified (439–532) and is located east of the town proper. The strongly fortified monastery, established in 484 and expanded over the centuries, stands on the west bank of Wadi en-Nar.

== Bibliography ==
- Al ‘Ubeidiya Town Profile (PDF). Palestinian Localities Study, Bethlehem Governorate. Jerusalem: The Applied Research Institute–Jerusalem (ARIJ). 2010.
- Barron, J.B., ed. (1923). Palestine: Report and General Abstracts of the Census of 1922. Government of Palestine.
- Conder, C.R.; Kitchener, H.H. (1883). The Survey of Western Palestine: Memoirs of the Topography, Orography, Hydrography, and Archaeology. Vol. 3. London: Committee of the Palestine Exploration Fund.
- Daniel (Abbot) (1864). Pèlerinage en Terre-Sainte de l'igoumène russe Daniel au commencement du ... (in French). St. Petersburg: Académie Impériale des Sciences.
- Dauphin, C. (1998). La Palestine byzantine, Peuplement et Populations. BAR International Series 726 (in French). Vol. III : Catalogue. Oxford: Archeopress. ISBN 0-860549-05-4.
- Government of Jordan, Department of Statistics (1964). First Census of Population and Housing. Volume I: Final Tables; General Characteristics of the Population (PDF).
- Government of Palestine, Department of Statistics (1945). Village Statistics, April, 1945.
- Guérin, V (1869). Description Géographique Historique et Archéologique de la Palestine (in French). Vol. 1: Judee, pt. 3. Paris: L'Imprimerie Nationale.
- Hadawi, S. (1970). Village Statistics of 1945: A Classification of Land and Area ownership in Palestine. Palestine Liberation Organization Research Center. Archived from the original on 2018-12-08.
- Hütteroth, W.-D.; Abdulfattah, K. (1977). Historical Geography of Palestine, Transjordan and Southern Syria in the Late 16th Century. Erlanger Geographische Arbeiten, Sonderband 5. Erlangen, Germany: Vorstand der Fränkischen Geographischen Gesellschaft. ISBN 3-920405-41-2.
- Marti, Karl; Schick, C (1880). "Mitteilungen von Bauart C. Schick in Jerusalem über die alten Lauren und Klöster in der Wüste Juda". Zeitschrift des Deutschen Palästina-Vereins. 3: 1–43. (Marti and Schick, 1880, pp. 34-37)
- Mills, E., ed. (1932). Census of Palestine 1931. Population of Villages, Towns and Administrative Areas. Jerusalem: Government of Palestine.
- Palmer, E.H. (1881). The Survey of Western Palestine: Arabic and English Name Lists Collected During the Survey by Lieutenants Conder and Kitchener, R. E. Transliterated and Explained by E.H. Palmer. Committee of the Palestine Exploration Fund.
- Pococke, R. (1745). A description of the East, and some other countries. Vol. 2. London: Printed for the author, by W. Bowyer.
- Pringle, D. (1998). The Churches of the Crusader Kingdom of Jerusalem: L-Z (excluding Tyre). Vol. II. Cambridge University Press. ISBN 0-521-39037-0. (pp. 271-278)
- Robinson, E.; Smith, E. (1841). Biblical Researches in Palestine, Mount Sinai and Arabia Petraea: A Journal of Travels in the year 1838. Vol. 2. Boston: Crocker & Brewster.
- Robinson, E.; Smith, E. (1841). Biblical Researches in Palestine, Mount Sinai and Arabia Petraea: A Journal of Travels in the year 1838. Vol. 3. Boston: Crocker & Brewster.
- Schick, C. (1899). "Reports by Dr. Conrad Schick". Quarterly Statement - Palestine Exploration Fund. 31: 36-37.
