= Hindaza =

- Municipality type D (Village council)

Arabic transcription(s)
- Location of Hindaza within Palestine
- Coordinates: 31°41′10″N 35°12′56″E
- State: State of Palestine
- Governorate: Bethlehem

Government
  - Type: Village council

Population (2017)
  - Total: 7,517

Hindaza (Arabic: هندازة) is a Palestinian village located six kilometers south-east of Bethlehem. The village is in the Bethlehem Governorate Southern West Bank. According to the Palestinian Central Bureau of Statistics, the village had a population of 7,517 in 2017. The primary healthcare is obtained in Za'atara where the Ministry of Heath have classified the care facilities as level 3. Founded by the at-Ta'mira Bedouin tribe, it is part of the 'Arab at-Ta'mira village cluster, along with Za'atara, Beit Ta'mir, Tuqu', Khirbet al-Deir (today part of Tuqu'), Nuaman, Ubeidiya and al-Asakra.
