= Za'atara =

- Municipality type C

Arabic transcription(s)
  - Arabic: زعترة
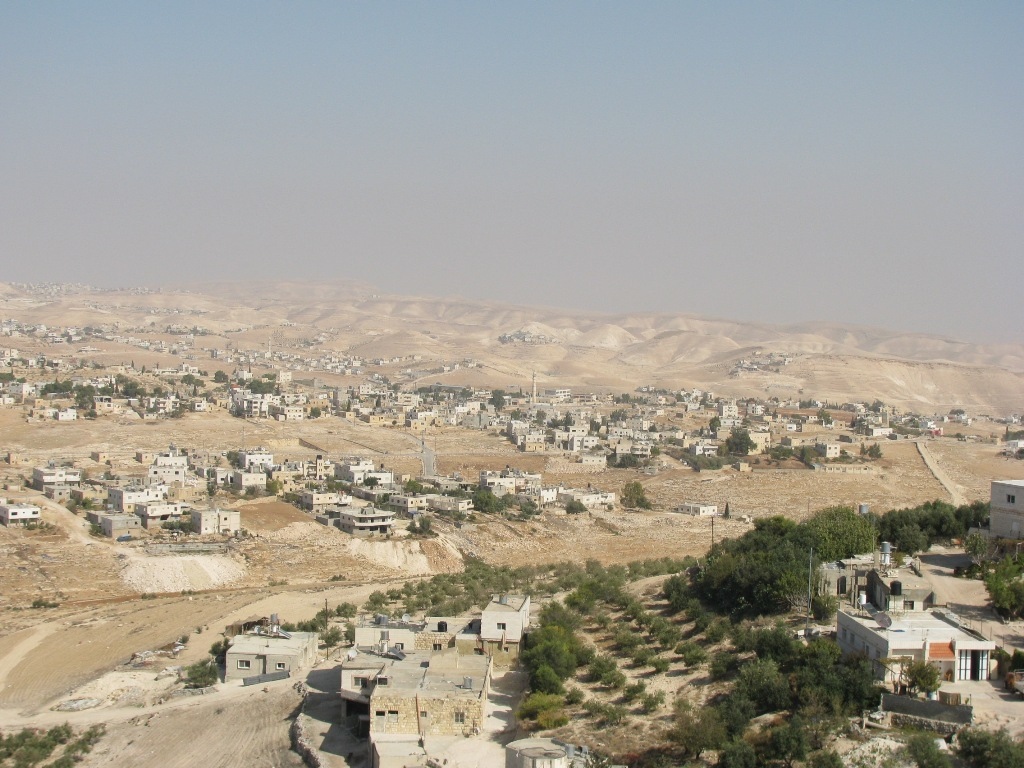
- Za'atara

- Location of Za'atara within Palestine
- Coordinates: 31°40′32″N 35°15′20″E
- State: State of Palestine
- Governorate: Bethlehem

Government
  - Type: Municipality

Population (2017)
  - Total: 7,849

Za'atara (Arabic: زعترة) is a Palestinian town located 11 km (6.8 mi) southeast of Bethlehem. The town is in the Bethlehem Governorate central West Bank. According to the Palestinian Central Bureau of Statistics, the town had a population of over 7,849 in 2017. Founded by the at-Ta'mira Bedouin tribe, it is part of the 'Arab at-Ta'mira village cluster, along with Beit Ta'mir, Hindaza, Khirbet al-Deir (today part of Tuqu'), Tuqu', Nuaman, Ubeidiya and al-Asakra.

== History ==
In the wake of the 1948 Arab–Israeli War, and after the 1949 Armistice Agreements, Za’atara came under Jordanian rule.

In 1961, under Jordanian rule, the population of Za'atara was 1,003.

=== Post−1967 ===
Since the Six-Day War in 1967, Za'atara has been held under Israeli occupation. 1,282 people were counted in the Israeli government's 1967 census.

After the 1995 accords, 0.9% of Za'atara land was classified as Area A, 44% classified as Area B, and 32.6% classified as Area C, while the remaining 22.5% is defined as "nature reserves". Israel has confiscated 20 dunams of village land for the Israeli settlement of El David and 10 dunams for an Israeli Military Base.

== Bibliography ==
- Government of Jordan, Department of Statistics (1964). First Census of Population and Housing. Volume I: Final Tables; General Characteristics of the Population (PDF).
