= Suleiman Jacir =

Palestinian Businessman and Philanthropist

Mayor of Bethlehem
- In office 1948–1959
- Preceded by: Khalil Yaqub
- Succeeded by: Issa Abdullah Marcus

Personal details
- Born: 1908 Bethlehem, Palestine
- Died: 1992 (aged 83–84)
- Occupation: Businessman, philanthropist
- Known for: Charitable work in the Bethlehem area

Suleiman Jacir (1908 - 1992) was a Palestinian businessman and philanthropist who served as Mayor of Bethlehem from 1948 to 1959. known for his charitable work in the Bethlehem area of the West Bank.

== Life ==
Born to a Palestinian Christian family, Jacir started his business career in the early 1930s as a partner in his family's construction and trading company. Later, he established his own company, which became one of the largest construction firms in Palestine. He also invested in land and real estate and owned several properties in the Bethlehem area.

Throughout his life, Jacir was dedicated to helping the poor and needy in his community. He established several charitable organizations, including the Suleiman Jacir Charity Fund, which provided financial assistance to families in need, and the Jacir Palace Hotel, which provided jobs and training opportunities for local residents.

Jacir died in 1992, but his legacy of philanthropy and community service continues through the work of the Suleiman Jacir Charity Fund, which continues to provide support to disadvantaged families in Bethlehem and the surrounding areas.
