= Palestinian Heritage Center =

Cultural center in Bethlehem, West Bank, Palestine

Coordinates: 31°43′23.42″N 35°12′13.45″E

- مركز التراث الفلسطيني
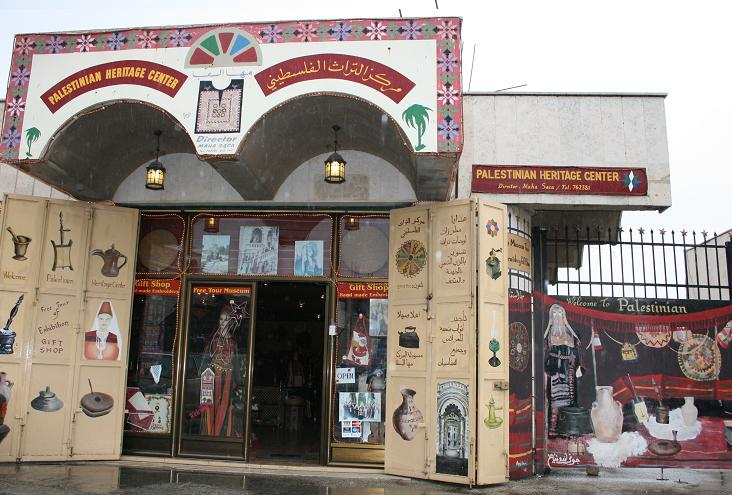
- The entrance to the Palestinian Heritage Center in Bethlehem
- Formation: 1991
- Type: Cultural center
- Purpose: Tourism, preservation, education
- Headquarters: Bethlehem
- Location: West Bank, Palestine
- Founder: Maha Saca
- Director: Maha Saca
- Website: http://www.palestinianheritagecenter.com

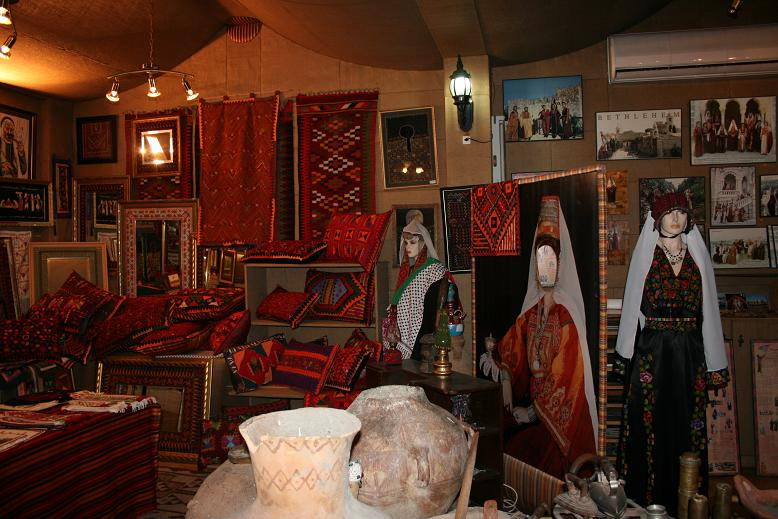
Part of the inside the Palestinian Heritage Center

The Palestinian Heritage Center (Arabic: مركز التراث الفلسطيني, romanized: Markaz al-Turāth al-Filasṭīnī) is a Palestinian cultural center located in Bethlehem, established in 1991 by Palestinian researcher Maha Saca. The center states that their objective is "to preserve and promote Palestinian cultural heritage, such as authentic dresses, jewelry, furniture, rare pieces, and household items, as well as the art of embroidery."

The center contains exhibitions of cultural items, as well as allowing tourists to design and purchase their own traditional gowns and embroidery, produced by women from villages and refugee camps surrounding Bethlehem. Also produced are postcards made from the museum's photographic collection, incorporating regional Palestinian dress in the images. The museum has collaborated with international institutions for educational exhibitions, such as at the Oriental Institute Museum at the University of Chicago from 2006-2007.

== History ==
In the 1980s, Maha Saca, born in Bethlehem, found herself drawn to the traditional Palestinian women's thobe and embroidery as a symbol of Palestinian heritage.

"Why the traditional Palestinian dress? This is the dress that girls used to learn to embroider, starting at the very young age of seven years; it is a woman’s traditional wedding dress, the dress of the village from which she was forcefully displaced, and the dress she will wear when she undeniably returns to her home."

In 1991, she held her first Palestinian fashion show, and established the Palestinian Heritage Center with the Palestinian Ministry of Tourism and Antiquities later that year. She felt that the center was important for maintaining and preserving the culture and history of Palestine and defending it from cultural appropriation and denial of heritage.

In October 2009, the Palestinian Heritage Center collaborated with organization Palestinian Children's Home Club to create an 18.1 meters wide and 32.6 meters tall thobe, which was unveiled in the Hussein Stadium in Hebron, hoping to have the dress entered in the Guinness Book of World Records. Saca designed the dress and around 150 women helped create it. The dress was dedicated to late Palestinian leader Yasser Arafat.

During Pope Francis's visit to Bethlehem in 2014, Saca presented him a scarf designed by her, embroidered with crosses and the Palestinian key of return symbol.

== See also ==
- List of museums in the State of Palestine
- Tourism in the State of Palestine
- Palestinian traditional costumes
