= Palestinian Meteorological Department =

Meteorological agency of the Government of palestine

- الأرصاد الجوية الفلسطينية (Arabic)

Agency overview
- Formed: 1994
- Headquarters: Ramallah, Palestine; 31°53′09″N 35°11′59″E
- Agency executive: Yousef Abu Asad, Director
- Website: www.pmd.ps

The Palestinian Meteorological Department (PMD; Arabic: الأرصاد الجوية الفلسطينية, romanized: Al-Arṣād al-Jawwīyah al-Filasṭīnīyah) is an organization that operates under the Ministry of Transportation. Its mission is to effectively utilize weather conditions to directly or indirectly serve various sectors of life and contribute to the development of the national economy in fields such as agriculture, water, energy, aviation, maritime navigation, scientific research, and public health. The first observations in Mandatory Palestine date from 1923, but the department was created in 1994 by the Palestinian National Authority after the Oslo Accords.

== History ==
The PMD's history of evolution can be summarized as follows:

In 1923, meteorological observations began in several locations under British rule, including Jerusalem, Jericho, Beit Qad (Jenin), Tulkarm, Arroub, and Wadi Fara. Following the events of 1948, the meteorological stations in the West Bank came under the Jordanian Meteorological Department, while the Gaza Strip station fell under the authority of the Egyptian Meteorological Authority.

In 1967, during the Israeli occupation of the West Bank, the meteorological station was captured, and new stations were established in Palestinian cities in the West Bank and the Gaza Strip. At that time, the focus of the department was primarily on measuring and recording meteorological elements.

In 1994, the meteorological stations were transferred to the Palestinian Authority. To develop expertise within the department, the Civil Aviation Authority sent 25 Palestinian trainees to Egypt for specialized training in meteorology.

In 1997, an additional training initiative took place, with fourteen Palestinian trainees sent to Morocco to acquire the necessary skills and qualifications to provide meteorological services. As a result, the department transformed into a directorate general under a presidential decree issued by the Ministry of Transportation.

In 1999, the Palestinian Meteorological Office became an observer member of the World Meteorological Organization (WMO) and a permanent member of the Arab Permanent Meteorological Committee of the League of Arab States. The network expanded with the inauguration of two new meteorological stations in Ramallah and the Gaza International Airport. Furthermore, a ground receiving station for weather maps and satellite images was constructed and used for aviation navigation purposes at the Gaza International Airport.

Over the years, efforts were made to enhance the knowledge and capabilities of the PMD staff. Employees received training at the Jordanian Meteorological Department in 2001, and between 2007 and 2008, approximately 30 employees were trained in various meteorological fields in Turkey, China, and Egypt.

In 2008, three new meteorological stations were installed in Kardalah in the Jordan Valley, Bethlehem, and Douma (southeast of Nablus). The stations in Jericho and Tulkarm were also renovated. Additionally, more than fifty rainfall stations were distributed throughout the West Bank and Gaza Strip, aiming to obtain climatological data across a wider geographical area.

In 2009, seventeen employees underwent practical training at the Jordanian Meteorological Department. The PMD also actively participated in conferences, workshops, and established local, regional, and international connections within the meteorological community.

== Mission ==
The PMD has several missions, which aim to:

- Optimize the utilization of weather conditions to directly or indirectly serve various aspects of life.
- Contribute effectively to the development of the national economy in diverse fields such as agriculture, water, energy, aviation, maritime navigation, scientific research, and public health.
- Ensure the safety of lives and property through accurate climatological data-based advice and guidance.

== Service ==
The PMD provides several services that can be organized as follows:

- Weather forecasts for the general public.
- Weather forecasts for farmers.
- Provision of climatic data to public and private sectors.
- Special weather forecasts for aviation.
- Special information for researchers and university students.
- Dissemination of regular bulletins through various media.
- Issuance of necessary warnings in cases of special and emergency weather conditions.

== Stations ==
The Palestinian Meteorological Department (PMD) is active in all governorates of the State of Palestine, where it has expanded since its establishment. In 1999, two weather stations were opened in the city of Ramallah and at the Gaza International Airport. In 2008, the PMD installed five stations in Jéricho, Tulkarem, Bethlehem, Kardala, and Douma, and also distributed over 50 rainfall stations. Today, it comprises a network of over a hundred rainfall stations and 15 electronic monitoring stations that provide data every fifteen minutes.

== Equipment ==
According to Youcef Abu Saad, the Director-General of the Palestinian Meteorological Department, the State of Palestine faces significant challenges in the field of meteorology. Two main factors contribute to this situation. Firstly, there is a shortage of financial resources and budgets allocated to this domain, hindering the acquisition and maintenance of necessary meteorological equipment. Additionally, Palestine has not attained permanent membership status in the World Meteorological Organization (WMO), currently holding observer status. Abu Saad also states that, "Israeli occupation also poses significant obstacles. Restrictions imposed by Israel impede the delivery of essential meteorological devices and equipment, such as radars, to the State of Palestine. Palestinian authorities face financial difficulties that limit their ability to access certain meteorological tools and programs."

However, despite these challenges, collaborations with neighboring countries such as Turkey and some Arab nations have enabled the acquisition of vital weather information and maps necessary for analysis and the issuance of meteorological forecasts within Palestine.
