= Jurat ash-Sham'a =

- Municipality type D (Village council)

Arabic transcription(s)
  - Latin: Jourah al-Sham'a (official)
- Location of Jurat ash-Sham'a within Palestine
- Coordinates: 31°38′57.03″N 35°10′06.54″E
- State: State of Palestine
- Governorate: Bethlehem

Government
  - Type: Village council

Population (2017)
  - Total: 1,778

Jurat ash-Sham'a is a Palestinian village located ten kilometers south of Bethlehem. The village is in the Bethlehem Governorate in the southern West Bank. According to the Palestinian Central Bureau of Statistics, the village had a population of 1,778 in 2017. The primary healthcare is obtained in Beit Fajjar where the Ministry of Heath have classified the care facilities as level 3.

During the Six-Day War in 1967, the town has come under Israeli occupation. The population in the 1967 census conducted by the Israeli authorities was 263. In the 1995 Oslo Accords most of the town was classified as Area B.
