= West Bank areas in the Oslo II Accord =

Division of the Israeli-occupied West Bank between Palestinian and Israeli control

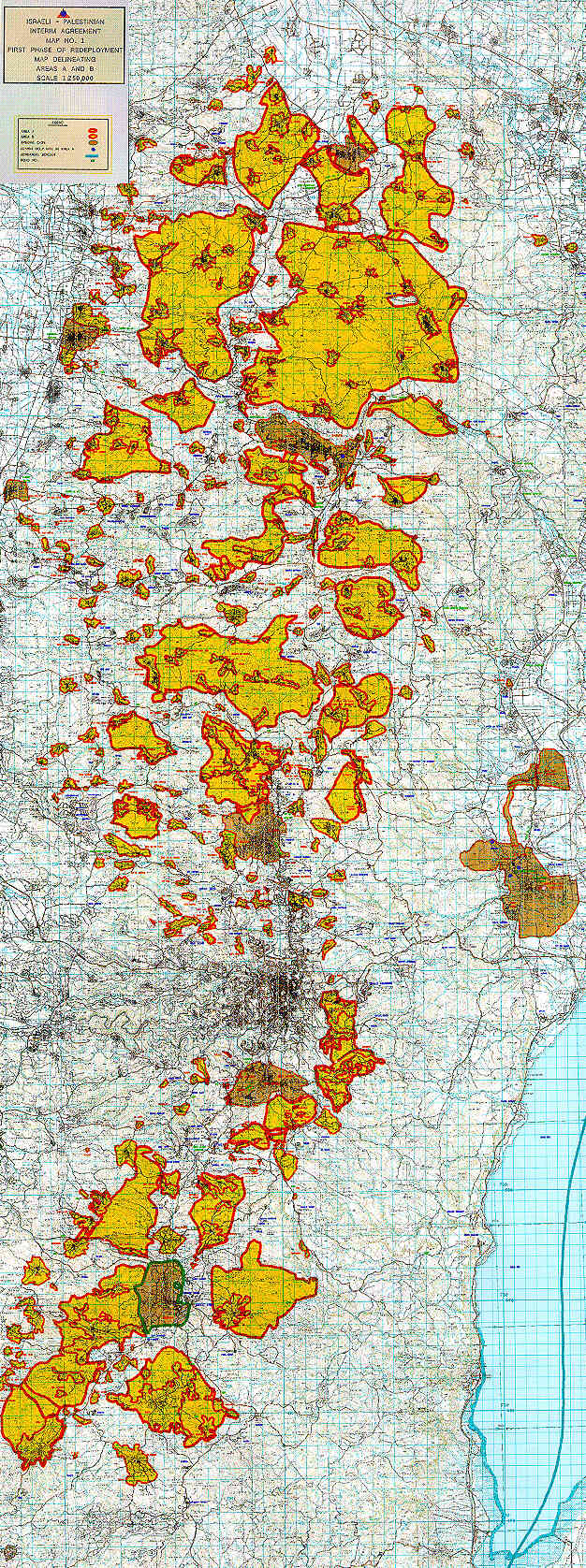
Official 1995 agreement map of Areas A and B (with C being defined as the rest of the West Bank)

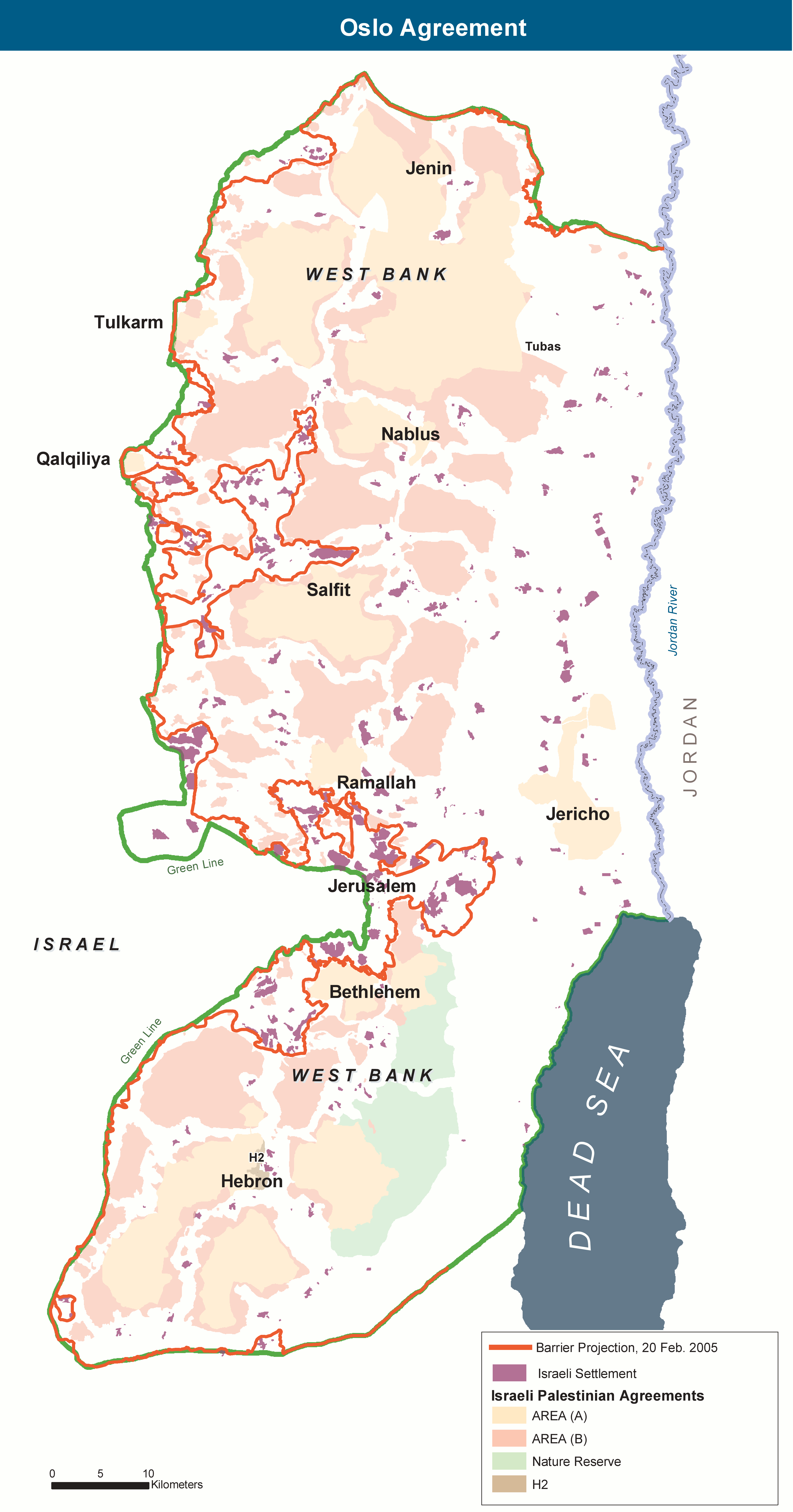
2005 map showing areas A and B along with nature reserves and Israeli settlements. The red line is a projected route of the West Bank Barrier

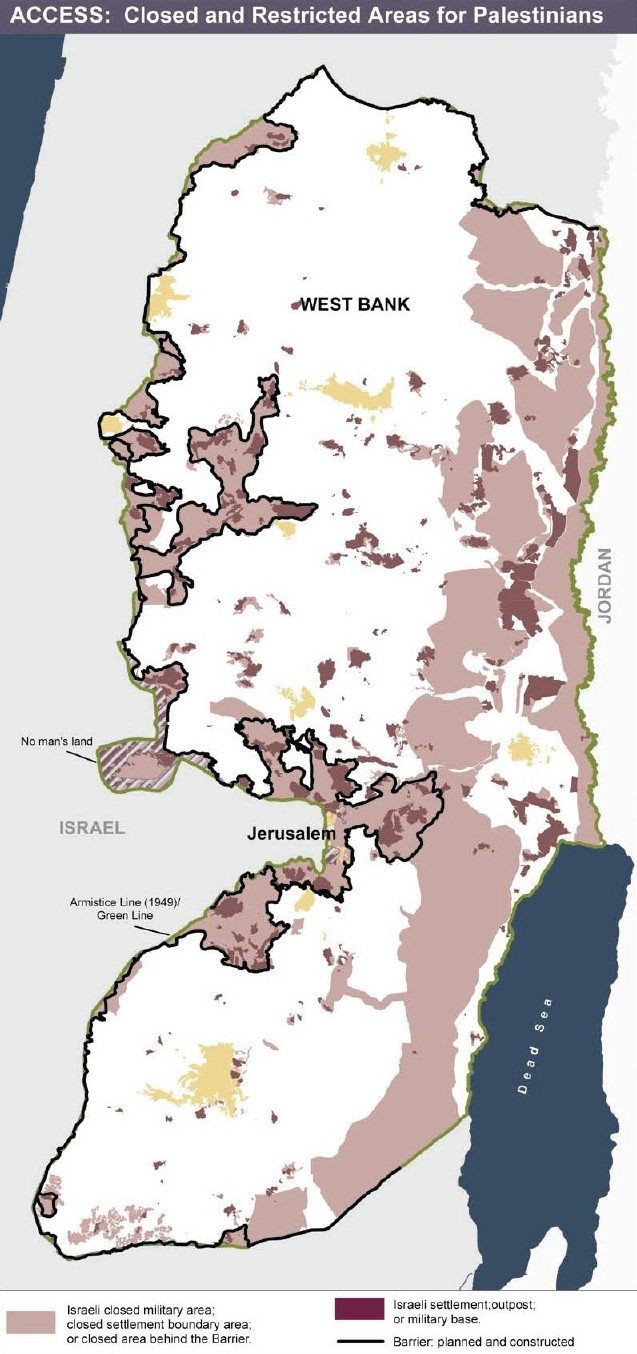
Map highlighting Area C where the access is closed and restricted to Palestinians. Darker areas are Israeli settlements and military posts within Area C.

The Oslo II Accord divided the Israeli-occupied West Bank into three administrative divisions: the Palestinian enclaves as "Areas A and B" and the remainder, including Israeli settlements, as "Area C".

The Palestinian enclaves were created by a process of subtraction by allocating to Area C everything that the Israeli government considered "important", thereby consigning the vast majority of Palestinians in the West Bank to the remaining non-contiguous areas.

Area C forms a contiguous territory on 61% of the West Bank, and is administered solely by Israel via the Judea and Samaria Area administration. As of 2015, it is home to 150,000 Palestinians in 532 residential areas, and roughly 400,000 Israelis in 135 settlements and more than 100 unrecognized outposts.

In contrast, Areas A and B are subdivided into 165 enclaves of land that have no territorial contiguity. Area A is exclusively administered by the Palestinian National Authority; Area B is administered by both the Palestinian Authority and Israel. Area A comprises approximately 18% of the total territory of the West Bank and Area B about 22% of the territory, together home to some 2.8 million Palestinians.

== Divisions ==
The Oslo II Accord stipulated that "during the first phase of redeployment" the jurisdiction over Areas A and B would be transferred to the Palestinian Council. Article XI.2.a reads: "Land in populated areas (Areas A and B), including government and Al Waqf land, will come under the jurisdiction of the Council during the first phase of redeployment."

The populated areas were defined by delineations on a map attached to the document. Area C comprised the areas of the West Bank outside Areas A and B.

=== Palestinian enclaves (Areas A and B) ===
Area A (full civil and security control by the Palestinian Authority): initially, circa 3% of the West Bank, exclusive East Jerusalem (first phase, 1995). As of 2013, Area A formally comprised about 18% of the West Bank. During the second intifada, the Israel Defense Forces abolished the prohibition against entering Area A during Operation Defensive Shield in 2002 and entered the area regularly, mostly at night, conducting raids to arrest suspected militants. Typically, such raids are coordinated with the Palestinian security forces. This area includes eight Palestinian cities and their surrounding areas (Nablus, Jenin, Tulkarem, Qalqilya, Ramallah, Bethlehem, Jericho and 80 percent of Hebron), with no Israeli settlements. Entry into this area is forbidden to all Israeli citizens.

Area B (Palestinian civil control and joint Israeli-Palestinian security control): initially, circa 23–25% (first phase, 1995). As of 2013, Area B formally comprised about 22% of the West Bank. This area includes some 440 Palestinian villages and their surrounding lands, and no Israeli settlements. It was defined in the accord as "the populated areas delineated by a red line and shaded in yellow on attached map No. 1, and the built-up area of the hamlets listed in Appendix 6 to Annex I"; this list of hamlets is as follows:

A. Tulkarm District	B. Nablus District	C. Salfit District	D. Jericho District	E. Qalqilya District	F. Jenin District	G. Hebron District	H. Ramallah District	I. Bethlehem District
1. Akkaba; 2. Al Nazla Al Wusta; 3. Koor; 4. Kife	1. Jalood; 2. Al-Juneid; 3. Al-Aqrabinya; 4. Nisf Jbeil; 5. Yanoon; 6. Iraq Bureen; 7. A'mouria	Khirbat Qays	Al-Zubeidet	1. Seer; 2. Khirbat Salman; 3. Falamiya; 4. Khirbat Ras Tera; 5. Asalah; 6. Al-Funduq; 7. Al-Modawar	1. Toura Al-Gharbiyyah; 2. Al-Zawiyyah; 3. Mashrou' Beit Qad; 4. Al Kafir; 5. Al Mutla; 6. Talfit; 7. Toura-Al Sharqiyyah	1. Al Aziz; 2. Khirbat Al-salam 3. Abu Al-A'sja 4. Sikka 5. Wadi Al-Shajna 6. Beit Marseem 7. Al-Hijra 8. Deir Razeh 9. Khilat Al-Mayat 10. Khilat Al A'qd 11. Um Lasafa 12. Qinan Jaber 13. Raboud 14. Shweik 15. Khirbat Skeik 16. Jroun Al-Louz 17. Beit Makdoum 18. Al-Mouriq 19. Al Beira 20. Al Juba 21. Beit I'mra 22. Turama 23. Hadb Al-Alaka 24. Deir Al-A'sal Al Tahta 25. Beit Al Roush Al-Tahata 26. Al-Deir 27. Kuezeiba 28. Hitta 29. Korza	1. Jibaa; 2. Ein Qinya; 3. Yabroud; 4. Deir Nitham; 5. Um Saffa; 6. Burham; 7. Al-Nabi Saleh; 8. Shibteen; 9. Khirbat Um Al-Lahm; 10. Beit Ijza	1. Wadi Al-Neis; 2. Mirah Rabah 3. Al Mas'ara 4. Um Salamouna 5. Al-Khas 6. Khilat Al-louz 7. Abu-Nijem 8. Beit Faloh 9. Breide'a 10. Khirbat Al-Deir 11. Daher Al-Nada 12. Al-Minshya 13. Khilat al-Hadad 14. Keisan 15. Al-Rashaida 16. Harmala 17. Mrah Mia'alla

=== Remainder of the West Bank (Area C), including Israeli settlements ===
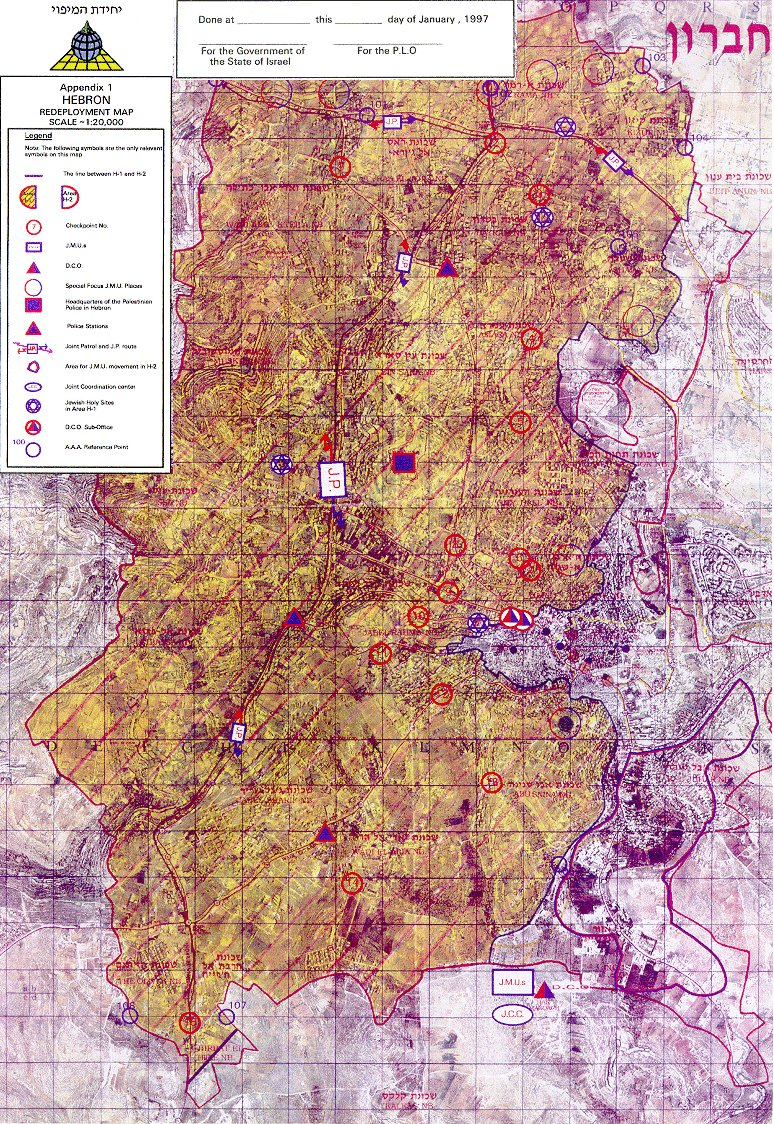
Official 1997 agreement map of Palestinian controlled H1 and Israeli controlled H2.

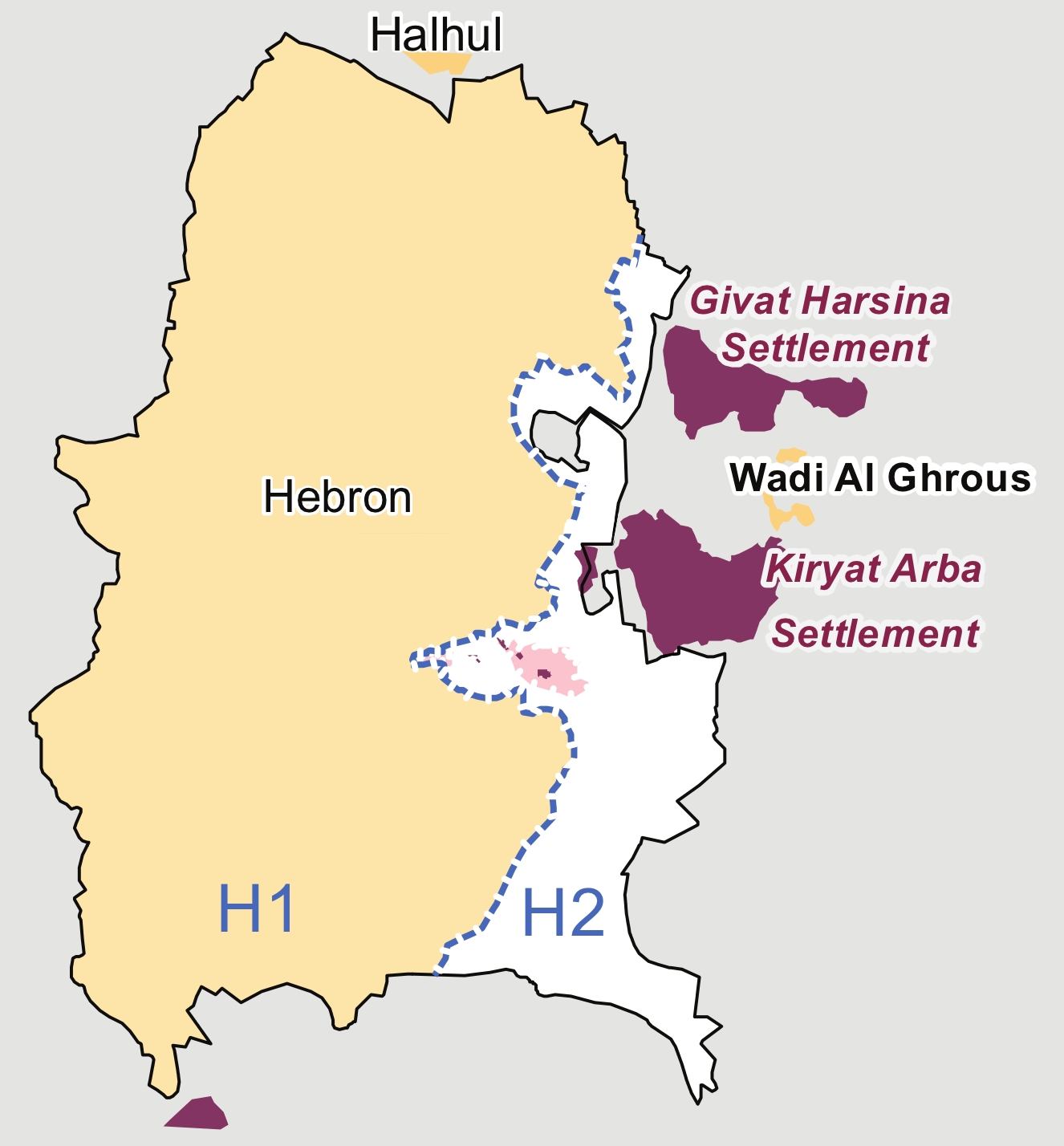
Illustration showing areas H1 and H2 and adjacent Israeli settlements

Area C (full Israeli civil and security control): initially, circa 72–74% (first phase, 1995). Under the 1998 Wye River Memorandum, Israel would further withdraw from some additional 13% from Area C to Area B, which officially reduced Area C to circa 61% of the West Bank. Israel, however, withdrew from only 2%, and during Operation Defensive Shield, it reoccupied all territory. As of 2013, Area C formally comprised about 63% of the West Bank, including settlements, outposts and declared "state land". Including or excluding annexed East Jerusalem, no-man's land and the Palestinian part of the Dead Sea also determines the percentage. John Kerry, U.S. Secretary of State under the Obama administration, stated that Area C "is effectively restricted for any Palestinian development, and that few building permits had been granted to Palestinian residents of the area.

All Israeli settlements (except those in East Jerusalem, which was annexed to Israel) are located in Area C. Oslo II, Article XII, for example, states: "For the purpose of this Agreement, 'the Settlements' means, in the West Bank the settlements in Area C; and in the Gaza Strip [which were later evacuated during the disengagement] ..."

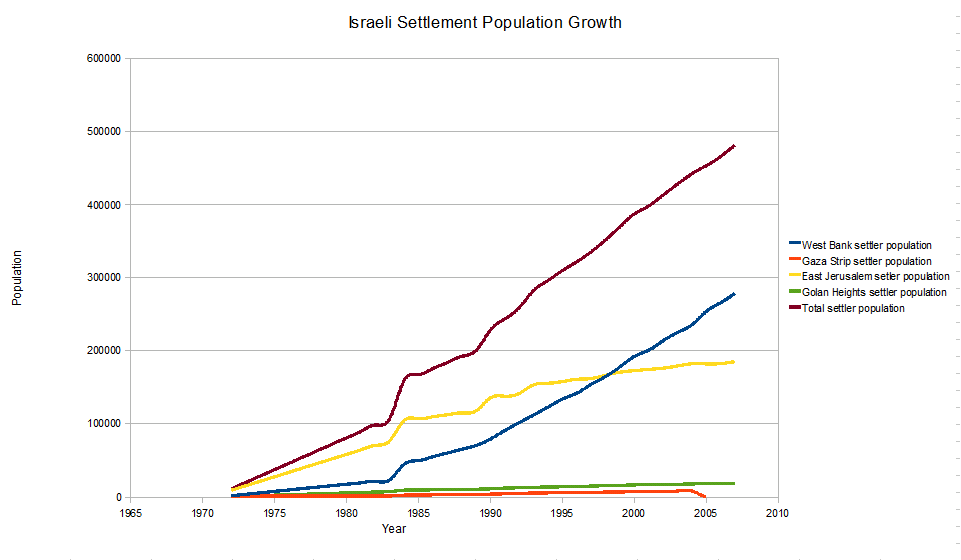
Settler population by year in the Israeli-occupied territories from 1972 to 2007

In 1972, there were 1,000 Israeli settlers living in what is now Area C. By 1993, their population had increased to 110,000. Over 400,000 Jewish settlers live in Area C in Israeli settlements and outposts. Approximately 300,000 Palestinians live there as well; who reside in more than 500 households areas located partially or fully in Area C.

==== Oslo definition of Area C ====
Oslo II defines Area C as follows:

"Area C" means areas of the West Bank outside Areas A and B, which, except for the issues that will be negotiated in the permanent status negotiations, will be gradually transferred to Palestinian jurisdiction in accordance with this Agreement.

The issues that will be negotiated, according to Article XVII, are "Jerusalem, settlements, specified military locations, Palestinian refugees, borders, foreign relations and Israelis; and … powers and responsibilities not transferred to the Council". Parts of Area C are military area closed for Palestinians.

==== Transfer of Area C ====
Part of Area C was intended to be handed to Palestinians by the end of 1999. Israel promised to redeploy its troops from Areas A and B before the elections. After the inauguration of an elected Palestinian parliament, the Israeli Civil Administration would be dissolved and the Israeli military government be withdrawn. The Council would get some powers and responsibilities.

Within 18 months from the date of inauguration, Israel would further redeploy military forces from Area C in three phases, however, without transfer of any sovereignty to the Palestinians:

The Council will assume powers and responsibilities for civil affairs, as well as for public order and internal security, according to this Agreement.

1. Israel shall transfer powers and responsibilities as specified in this Agreement from the Israeli military government and its Civil Administration to the Council in accordance with this Agreement. Israel shall continue to exercise powers and responsibilities not so transferred.

5. After the inauguration of the Council, the Civil Administration in the West Bank will be dissolved, and the Israeli military government shall be withdrawn. The withdrawal of the military government shall not prevent it from exercising the powers and responsibilities not transferred to the Council.

The military forces would be redeployed in "specified military locations" in the West Bank, to be negotiated in the permanent status negotiations within 18 months. The Legislative Council was elected in January 1996.

==== Use of Area C ====
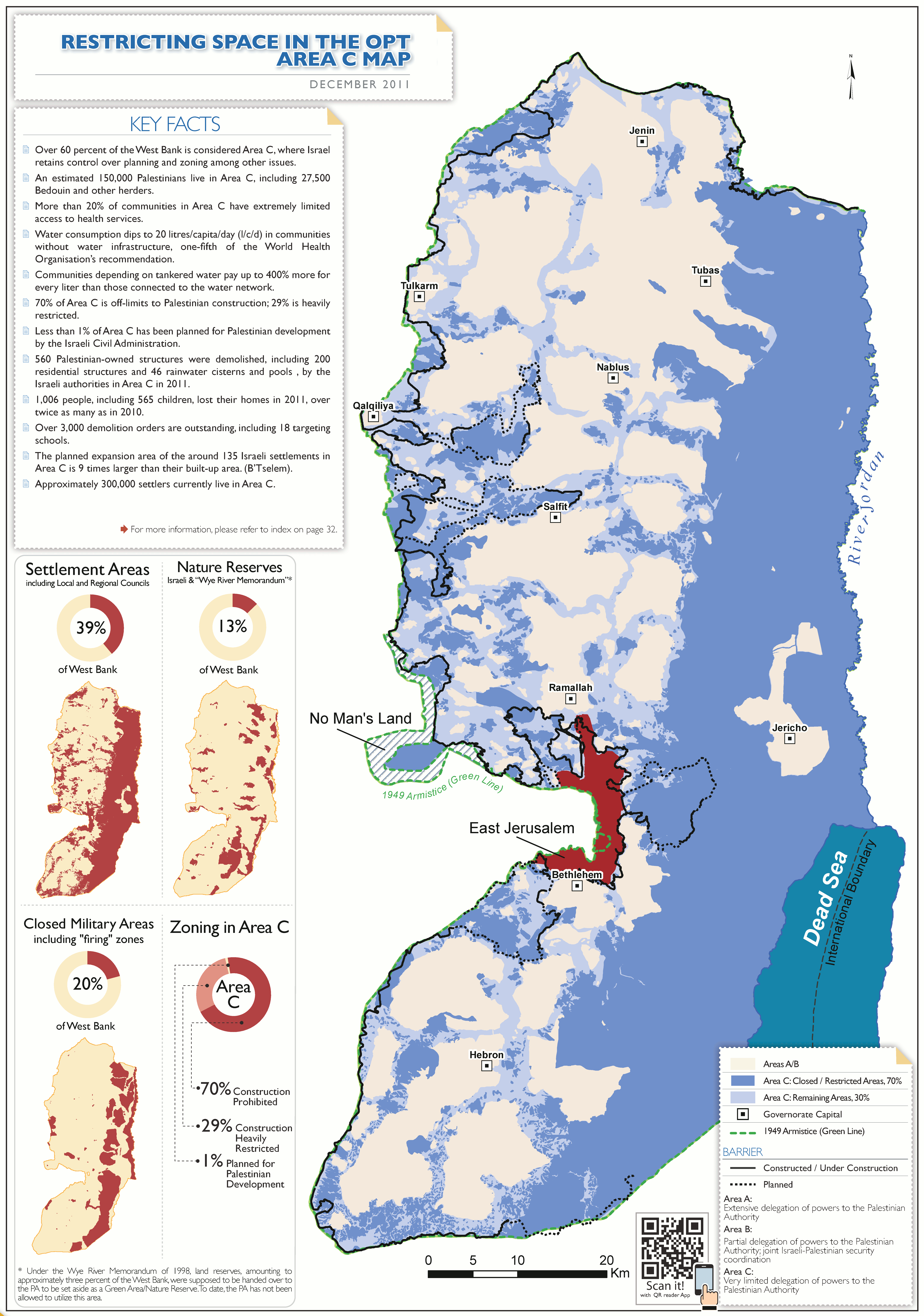
OCHAoPt map of Area C. More than 99% of Area C is heavily restricted or off-limits to Palestinian development, with 68% reserved for Israeli settlements, approximately 21% for closed military zones, and about 9% for nature reserves. Construction permits for residential or economic purposes are, according to World Bank, "virtually impossible" for Palestinians to obtain.

Area C, 99% of which is excluded from Palestinian use, contains most of the West Bank's natural resources and open spaces, access to which, according to the World Bank, would enable the Palestinians to halve their budget deficit and lead to an expansion of their economy by a third. According to Danny Rubinstein: "Much land in Area C is undeveloped. Israel, however, does not permit Palestinian construction for residential, commercial or industrial purposes."

70 percent of the area is defined as within settler municipal boundaries, where permits for development are denied to Palestinians. The World Bank estimates that the effect has been to cause a potential loss of $14 billion of revenue for the Palestinian economy.

According to a 2013 EU report, Israeli policies have undermined the Palestinian presence in Area C, with a deterioration in basic services such as water supplies, education and shelter. Nearly 70% of the Palestinian villages are not connected to the water network that serves settlers, which accounts for the fact that Palestinians in the zone use only a quarter to a third of the pro capita consumption of settlers.

Palestinians cannot build in Area C without an army permit; however, building applications are expensive and have a 5% approval rate. As a result, most Palestinians who build there do so illegally. Israel demolishes about 200 buildings per year in Area C.

Israel has made over 14,000 demolition orders against Palestinian-owned structures in Area C since 1988. As of January 2015, almost 20% of the demolition orders issued had been executed and more than 11,000 of these still outstanding, affecting an estimated 17,000 structures.

Israeli planning in Area C allocates 13 times more space to Israeli settlers than to Palestinians there, according to the United Nations. Israeli settlers have been allocated about 790 square meters per capita, whereas Palestinians have been allocated about 60 square meters per capita.

During the period 1988–2014, the Israeli Civil Administration issued 6,948 demolition orders against structures in settlements located in Area C. As of January 2015, 12% of these were classified as executed, 2% were cancelled, another 2% "ready for execution" and 2% on hold due to legal proceedings. More than one-third of the orders were classified as "in process", while the current status of about 45% of the demolition orders against settlement structures was unknown.

== Alleged violation of the accords ==
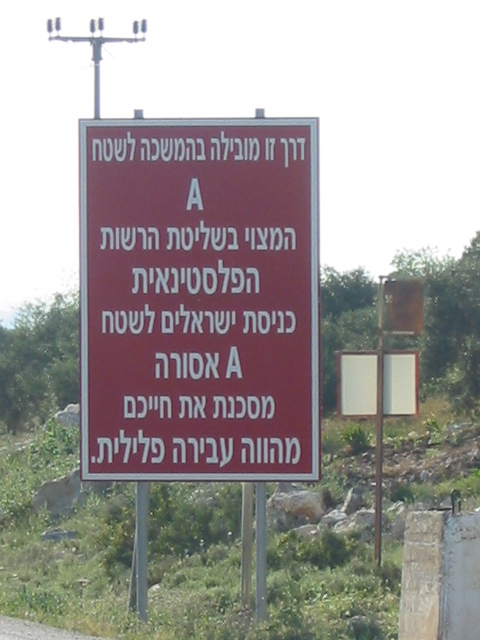
Israeli signpost warning Israeli citizens that entry into Area 'A' is forbidden, life-endangering, and constitutes a criminal offense

The relatively new phenomenon of building Palestinian settlements began in 2006, attempting to trace after the Israeli settlement experience beyond the 1967 Green Line, and in a media-driven counter-offensive. The most notable Palestinian settlement in the West Bank, defined by Israel as "illegal", was built in January 2013 on E1 Area East of Jerusalem. The settlement which was named "Bab al-Shams" consisted of about 20 tents, constructed by the Popular Struggle Co-ordination Committee. A few days after the evacuation, another "Palestinian settlement" was erected in the village of Beit Iksa near the planned Wall barrier, which they claim would confiscate Palestinian land. It was named "Bab al-Karama".

Area B is defined as land under Palestinian civil control and Israeli military control. According to Dror Etkes, Israeli settlers have violated the accords by spreading into Area B and seizing private Palestinian land for cultivation and settlement. Examples he cites are the Amona settlement, overlooking Ofra, where he argues that land belonging to villagers of Deir Dibwan has been taken for redevelopment; the settlement of Itamar which he says has seized control of land and resources belonging to the Area B villages of Yanun, Awarta and Einabus; he states that settlers have seized Area B land near Esh Kodesh and Mitzpeh Ahiya east of Shilo; and he states that settlers of Ma'ale Rehav'am have built in a nature reserve established under the Wye River Memorandum.

== Religious sites ==
Responsibility for religious sites in the West Bank and Gaza Strip was to be transferred to the Palestinian side, gradually in the case of Area C. The Palestinian side agreed to ensure free access to a specific list of Jewish religious sites but due to the uncertain security situation the Israel Defense Forces limits visits by Jews to rare occasions. In Area C, Nabi Musa was to be under the auspices of the Palestinian side and access to al-Maghtas on the Jordan River was promised for particular religious events.

== See also ==
- Palestinian territories
- Sharm el-Sheikh Memorandum
- Israel's unilateral disengagement plan
- Status of territories occupied by Israel in 1967
- Palestinian enclaves
