= 'Azza =

Palestinian refugee camp in Bethlehem

'Azza Beit Jibrin Camp
- Refugee camp

Arabic transcription(s)
  - Arabic: مخيم بيت جبرين
  - Latin: Beit Jibrin Camp (unofficial)
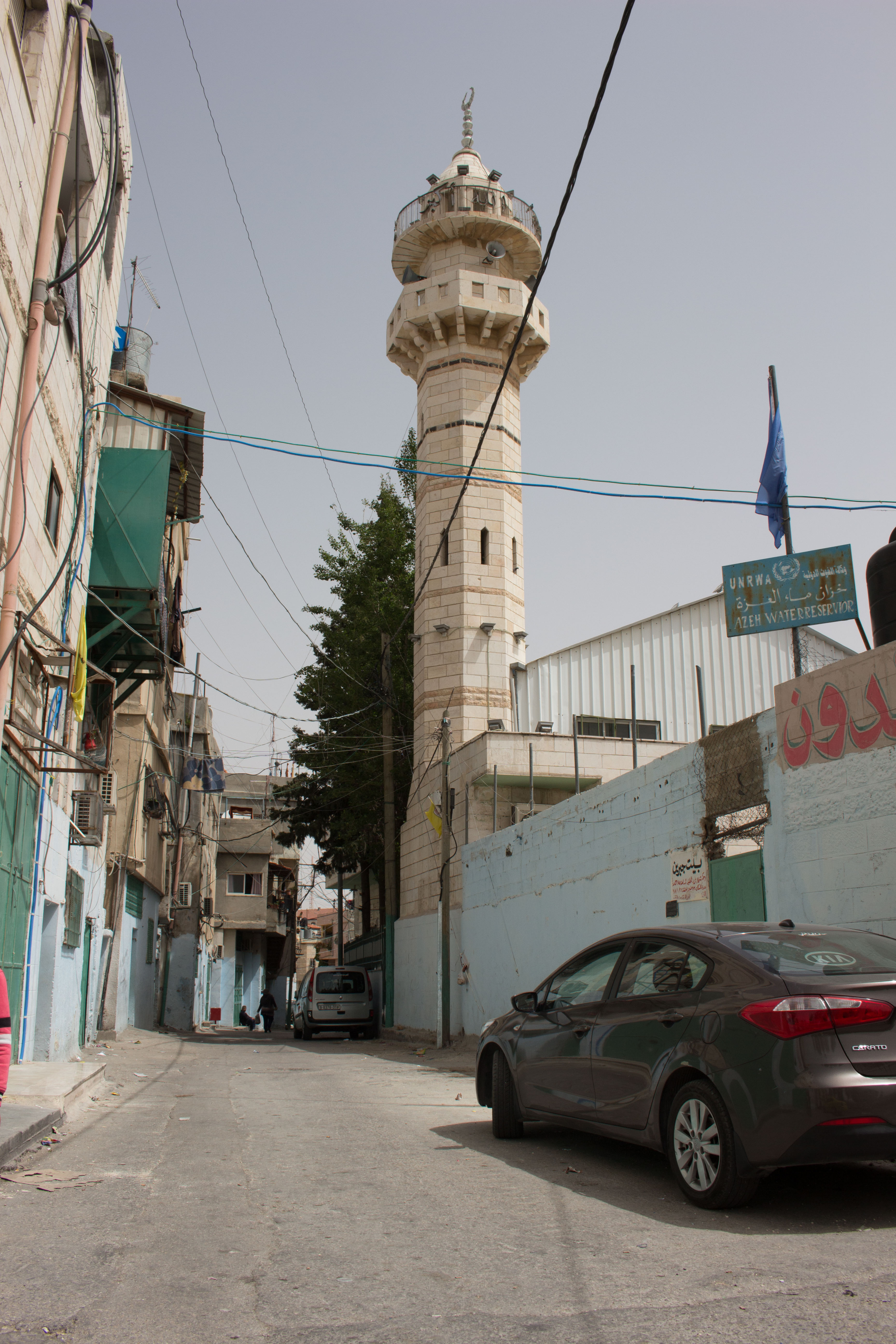
- Al 'Azza entrance

- Location of 'Azza
- Coordinates: 31°42′55″N 35°12′8″E
- State: State of Palestine
- Governorate: Bethlehem
- Founded: 1950

Government
  - Type: Refugee Camp (from 1950)

Area
  - Total: 0.27 km^{2} (0.10 sq mi)

Population (2017)
  - Total: 1,523

'Azza (Arabic: مخيم العزة; also spelled 'Azzeh, 'Azzah or Alazzeh) also known as Beit Jibrin Camp (Arabic: مخيم بيت جبرين) is a Palestinian refugee camp in the Bethlehem Governorate located within the city of Bethlehem. It is the smallest of the 59 Palestinian refugee camps in the West Bank and nearby countries. It was established in 1950 in an area of 20 dunams (0.020 km^{2}; 0.0077 sq mi) and receives services from UNRWA workers based in nearby Aida Camp. Inside the camp, there are no medical or educational services, so it was merged with the Aida Camp for the purposes of receiving services.

The camp is named after a prominent Palestinian family from the depopulated village of Beit Jibrin west of the Hebron Hills in present-day Israel. The UNRWA recorded a population of 2,025 in 2005, while the Palestinian Central Bureau of Statistics (PCBS) projected a population of 1,750 in 2006, with UNRWA reporting a population of approximately 1,337 refugees and 2,900 total in 2016. The PCBS reported a population of 1,523 in 2017.

It has been under the control of the Palestinian National Authority since 1995.

Other nearby landmarks include Jacir Palace, The Walled Off Hotel, Rachel's Tomb, Bethlehem University, the Palestine Museum of Natural History, and the Israeli settlements of Gilo and Har Homa. The nearest access point to Jerusalem, on the other side of the West Bank barrier, is Checkpoint 300 to the north.

== See also ==
- Al-Arroub (camp)
- Dheisheh
