= Caritas Baby Hospital =

Hospital in Bethlehem, Palestine

- Caritas
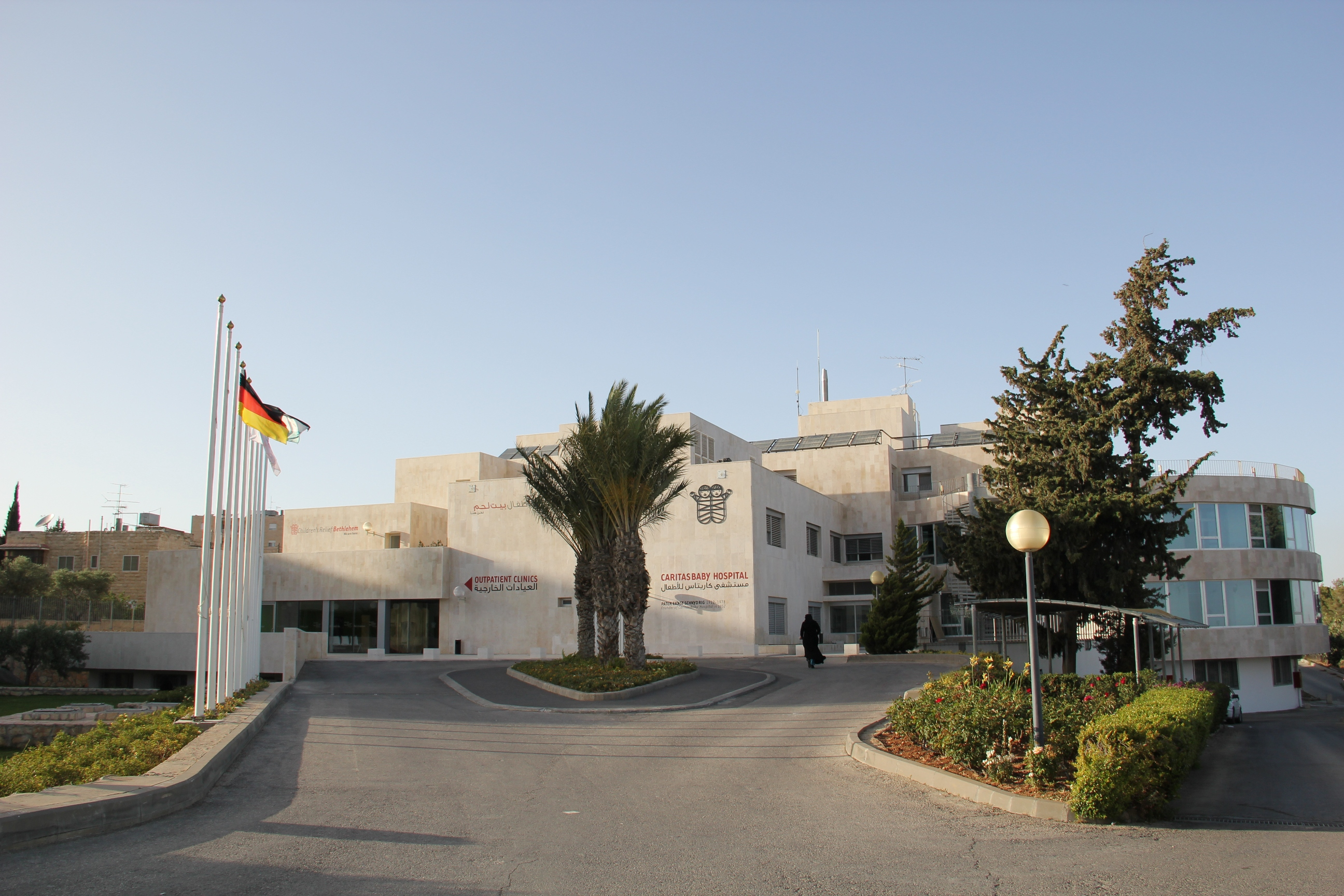
- The Caritas Baby Hospital in Bethlehem

Geography
- Location: Bethlehem, Bethlehem Governorate, Palestinian territories

Organisation
- Type: Specialist
- Religious affiliation: Catholic

Services
- Beds: 91 (nine are for intensive care)
- Speciality: Pediatric

History
- Founded: 1953

Links
- Website: www.cbh.ps/en

The Caritas Baby Hospital (CBH) is the only purely pediatric hospital in Palestine. It falls into the jurisdiction of the Latin Patriarchate of Jerusalem and is sustained by the Catholic non-profit organizations Kinderhilfe Bethlehem and Aiuto Bambini Betlemme (Children's Relief Bethlehem) in Switzerland, Germany and Italy.

The hospital serves about 50,000 children per year, aged newborn to 18.

== History ==
The hospital was founded in 1953 by the Caritas worker Hedwig Vetter, the priest Ernst Schnydrig and the pediatrician Antoine Dabdoub. The hospital started with 14 children from the Aida refugee camp, being treated in two rented rooms. Since 1969, the hospital has been connected to different orders of nuns, including the Order of the Holy Cross and the Franciscan Elizabethan Sisters of Padua (from 1975); as of 2025, the hospital hosts nuns from the Sisters of Charity.

Following the outbreak of the Gaza war in 2023, the hospital opened a phone line to provide medical advice to patients and families unable to visit the hospital due to road closures by the Israeli military. The hospital's social work team also limited their home visits to only the most dire cases, due to "uncertainty on the roads". As of May 2024, the hospital, itself located in the Westbank, was also caring for seven children from Gaza; the children had been undergoing treatment in Israeli hospitals prior to the outbreak of the war, and were unable to return home.

== Services ==
The services of the hospital include an emergency unit, an intensive care unit, a neonatal ward, and an observation ward. Specialized departments included cardiology, endocrine, feeding and swallowing disorders, gastroenterology, genetic and metabolic, hematology, mental health, nephrology, neurology, nutrition, orthopedic, pulmonary, rheumatology and urology. The hospital also offers diagnostic services (laboratory, radiology, specialized tests), paramedical services (dietary services, pharmacy, physiotherapy) and social support (social services, mothers' residency, and a children playroom).

A surgical ward is currently under construction and intended to be operational by 2026.

The hospital employs about 250 people, making it one of the biggest employers in the area.

== Associated studies ==
- Corradin, Lucia; Hindiyeh, Musa; Khaled, Rasha; Rishmawi, Fadi; Zidan, Marwan; Marzouqa, Hiyam (2014-03-06). "Survey on Infant Hearing Loss at Caritas Baby Hospital in Bethlehem-Palestine". Audiology Research. 4 (1): 99. doi:10.4081/audiores.2014.99. ISSN 2039-4330. PMC 4627132. PMID 26557353.
