= Arayes =

Arayes may refer to:

- A Levantine dish of stuffed pitas, see Hawawshi § Arayes
- Al-Arayes Pond, a pond in Irbid, Jordan

== See also ==
- Arayis
- Arayi
