= Khallet al-Haddad =

- Municipality type D (Village council)

Arabic transcription(s)
  - Arabic: خلة الحداد
  - Latin: Khallet al-Haddad (official)
- Location of Khallet al-Haddad within Palestine
- Coordinates: 31°39′26″N 35°11′25″E
- State: State of Palestine
- Governorate: Bethlehem

Government
  - Type: Village council

Population (2017)
  - Total: 507

Khallet al-Haddad is a Palestinian village located 5.5 km (3.4 mi) south of Bethlehem. The village is in the Bethlehem Governorate in the southern West Bank. It is bordered to the east by the town of Teqoa, to the north by the town of Jannatah, to the west by the village of Al-Ma'sara, and to the south by the lands of the town of Teqoa. The area of the village is about 1,742 dunums, including 1,678 arable lands and 24 residential areas.

There is one mosque in the village, which is the Mosque of the Pious. It contains a site called Sada Bishr, and the Al-Sawafeer Canal for collecting water, which existed from the time of the Romans. The village contains a basic school consisting of nine grades (1–9), and this school was named after the village.

== History ==
Khallet al-Haddad was given this name, after a person who previously worked as a blacksmith, and who used to come from the city to this area every year to make shoes for horses and mules there, so the village was named by this name. The founding of the village dates back to 1953, and the origin of the village's population goes back to nomadic Bedouins.

== Geography ==
=== Climate ===
Khallet al-Haddad is located 834 m (2,736 ft) above sea level, the average annual rainfall is about 525 mm, the average temperature reaches 16.2 degrees Celsius, and the average relative humidity is about 61%.

=== Demographics ===
According to the Palestinian Central Bureau of Statistics, the village had a population of 507 in 2017., up from 407 in the 2007 census, including 220 males and 187 females. The village's population consists of several families, including: Mustafa, Musa, Hassan, Hajjaj, and Khalaf.
