= Arayis =

Arayis may refer to:

- Arayış, a former Turkish-language political magazine
- Wadi al-Arayis, a village in Bethlehem, Palestine

== See also ==
- Arayi
- Arayes
