= Khallet al-Louza =

- Municipality type D (Village council)

Arabic transcription(s)
  - Arabic: خلة اللوزة
- Location of Khallet al-Louza within Palestine
- Coordinates: 31°40′38″N 35°11′51″E
- State: State of Palestine
- Governorate: Bethlehem

Government
  - Type: Village council

Population (2017)
  - Total: 645

Khallet al-Louza (Arabic: خلة اللوزة; also Khalayel al-Louz) is a Palestinian village in the Bethlehem Governorate in south-central West Bank about 3 to 4 kilometres south of Bethlehem city. It is administered by the Hindazah and Brid'ah Municipal Council.

== History ==
The area was primarily agricultural land, associated particularly with olive and almond cultivation. In the early 1950s, the area of Khallet al-Louza was administered by Jordan after the 1948 Palestine war, as a result of the 1949 Armistice Agreements but was not counted as a separate village. Over the years, gradual residential expansion took place. The village fell under Israeli occupation after the Six-Day War. After the establishment of the Palestinian National Authority in 1994 as a result of the 1993 peace agreement between the Palestine Liberation Organization and Israel, the village area became divided into three zones. Over half of the village land's are in Area C, with significant portions also in Area B (16.3%) and Area A (29.9%).

== Developments in the 2020s ==
Since 2023, Khallet al-Louza has experienced an increase in Israeli settler attacks following the establishment and subsequent expansion of a settlement outpost on nearby land in the years before. According to the United Nations Office for the Coordination of Humanitarian Affairs (OCHA), the outpost was established in September 2023 and expanded with additional structures, including caravans, in August 2024. OCHA recorded 21 settler attacks in the village between September 2023 and November 2025, compared with three between January 2017 and August 2023. In 2024 alone, OCHA documented 13 attacks, ten of which resulted in casualties or property damage. During the olive harvest in October 2024, settlers assaulted farmers, burned 40 mature olive trees and severely injured two elderly farmers, both of whom sustained limb fractures.

Attacks continued to impact the residents throughout 2025 and 2026; with incidents documented ranging from attacks from nearby settlers as well as Israeli forces assaulting residents. On March 26, 2026, the Red Cresent reported that a Palestinian was critically wounded by live ammunition to the head during a settler attack in the Khallet al Louza area and was transported to hospital. On 7 August 2026, settlers attacked vehicles and a water tanker in the area and neighbouring Abu Njeim area. According to the Palestinian Red Crescent Society, an ambulance responding to injured residents in the location was attacked with stones, injuring two parademics and damaging the ambulance.

== Demographics ==
According to the Palestinian Central Bureau of Statistics, the village had a population of 645 in 2017, up from 447 in mid-year 2006.
