= Al-Arroub (camp) =

Palestinian refugee camp in the West Bank

al-Arroub Camp
- Refugee Camp

Arabic transcription(s)
  - Arabic: مخيّم العروبة
  - Latin: al-'Arrub (official) al-Aroub (unofficial)
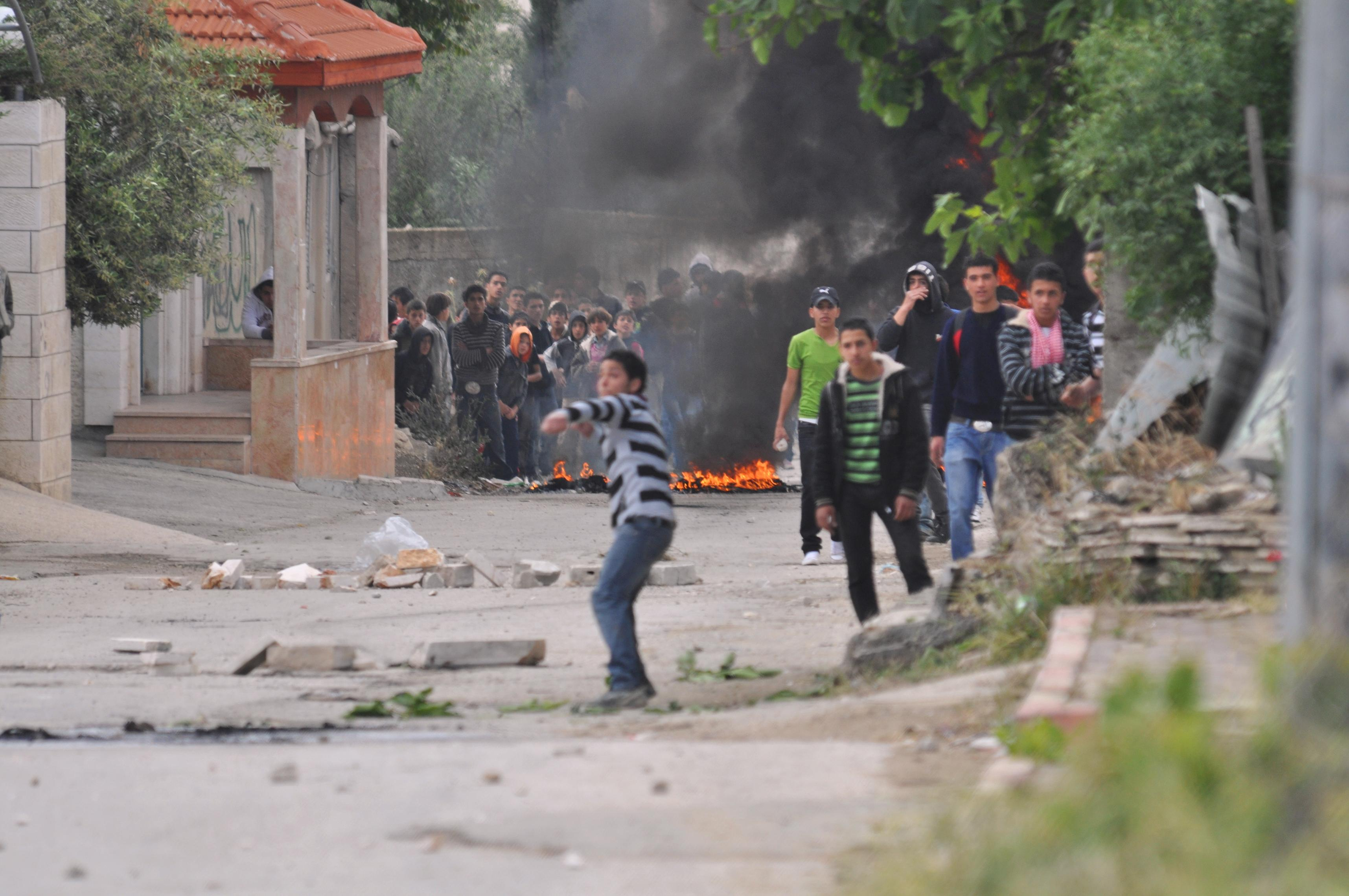
- Palestinians demonstrating against the occupation in El-Arrub, 2011

- Location of al-Arroub Camp within Palestine al-Arroub Camp (the West Bank)
- Coordinates: 31°37′23.18″N 35°08′12.19″E
- State: State of Palestine
- Governorate: Hebron

Government
  - Type: Refugee Camp (from 1950)

Area
  - Total: 0.24 km^{2} (0.093 sq mi)

Population (2017)
  - Total: 8,941
  - Density: 37,000/km^{2} (96,000/sq mi)

Al-Arroub (Arabic: مخيّم العروب, lit. 'Camp al-'Arrub') is a Palestinian refugee camp in the West Bank, located adjacent to the towns of Shuyukh al-Arrub and Halhul and along Highway 60 in the Hebron Governorate, Palestine. Al-Arroub is 15 kilometers south of Bethlehem, and has a total land area of 240 dunums.

Since the Six-Day War in 1967, the camp has been under Israeli occupation. The population in the 1967 census conducted by the Israeli authorities was 3,647. In 2005, the UNRWA reported that the camp had a population of 9,859 registered refugees. The population was 8,941 in 2011, according to the Palestinian Central Bureau of Statistics (PCBS).

In 2002, two schools were built in the camp: the Arroup Secondary School for boys, and another school for girls.

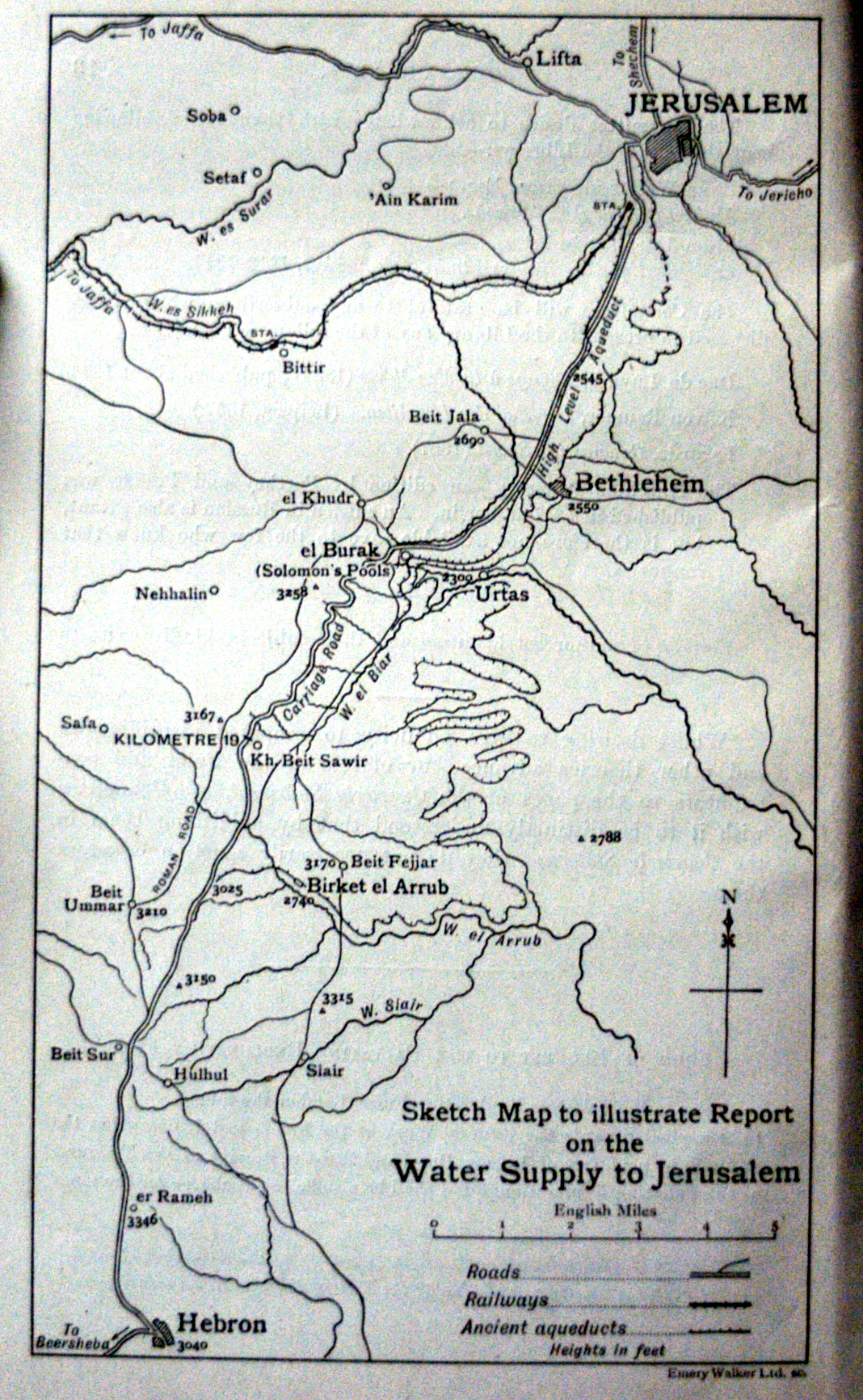
Al-Arroub before 1948, supplying water to Jerusalem

== Location ==
Since the Oslo Accords were signed in the 1990s, the West Bank has been divided into Areas A, B, and C, each with different responsibilities and powers given to Israeli and Palestinian authorities. Most of Al-Arroub is located within Area B, although the section of Highway 60 within the boundary of the camp is in Area C.

== Incidents ==
On 11 November 2019, 22-year-old Omar Badawi was shot dead by Israeli troops in a nearby alley as he stepped out of his house with a towel to dowse a small fire nearby set off by a Molotov cocktail thrown by youths in the direction of the soldiers who had entered the camp. The event was caught on video. An IDF investigation as of November 2021 has not yet come to a conclusion.

== Gaza war (2023–present) ==
On 3 March 2025, during the January 2025 Gaza war ceasefire, the Israeli military detained 4 Palestinians (3 minors and 1 adult) from Al-Arroub camp, according to Wafa.

On 21 April 2025, the International Middle East Media Center reported that the Israeli military had taken 4 children from the camp.

== See also ==
- 'Azza
- Aida Camp
- Beit Bracha Resort
- Dheisheh
