= Al-Dawha =

al-Dawha
- Municipality type C

Arabic transcription(s)
  - Arabic: الدوحة
  - Latin: ad Doha (official)
- Location of al-Dawha within Palestine
- Coordinates: 31°42′6″N 35°11′11″E
- State: State of Palestine
- Governorate: Bethlehem
- Named for: Doha, capital of Qatar

Government
  - Type: Municipality

Population (2017)
  - Total: 12,752

Al-Dawha (Arabic: الدوحة) is a Palestinian area located in Beit Jala, two kilometers southwest of Bethlehem. Originally a part of Beit Jala, in 1977 the mayor of Beit Jala made an official trip to Qatar where he was endowed with a sum of money to develop the town's infrastructure. As a tribute to Qatar's funding, an area of Beit Jala was renamed Al-Dawha, a reference to the Qatari capital of Doha. In 1996, this area was officially converted into the city of Al-Dawha along with the formation of the new municipal council of Al-Dawha.

According to the Palestinian Central Bureau of Statistics, the town had a population of 12,752 in 2017.

Al-Dawha is 90% Muslim and 10% Christians.
