= Juhdum =

Juhdum جهاثم
- Municipality type D (Village council)

Arabic transcription(s)
- Location of Juhdum within Palestine
- Coordinates: 31°42′17″N 35°16′4″E
- State: State of Palestine
- Governorate: Bethlehem

Government
  - Type: Village council

Population (2006)
  - Total: 1,391

Juhdum (Arabic: جهاثم) is a Palestinian village located eight kilometers east of Bethlehem.The village is in the Bethlehem Governorate Southern West Bank. According to the Palestinian Central Bureau of Statistics, the village had a population of 1,391 in mid-year 2006.
