= Dar Salah =

- Municipality type D (Village council)

Arabic transcription(s)
  - Arabic: دار صلاح
- Location of Dar Salah within Palestine
- Coordinates: 31°42′44″N 35°16′16″E
- State: State of Palestine
- Governorate: Bethlehem

Government
  - Type: Village council

Population (2017)
  - Total: 4,588

Dar Salah (Arabic: دار صلاح) is a Palestinian village located 6 km (3.7 mi) east of Bethlehem. The village is in the Bethlehem Governorate Southern West Bank. According to the Palestinian Central Bureau of Statistics, the village had a population of 4,588 in 2017.

As of February 2015, Dar Salah had the only ostrich farm in the Palestinian territories, a unique project by a local farmer.
