= Jacir Palace =

Hotel in Bethlehem, Palestine

Coordinates: 31.7174°N 35.2013°E

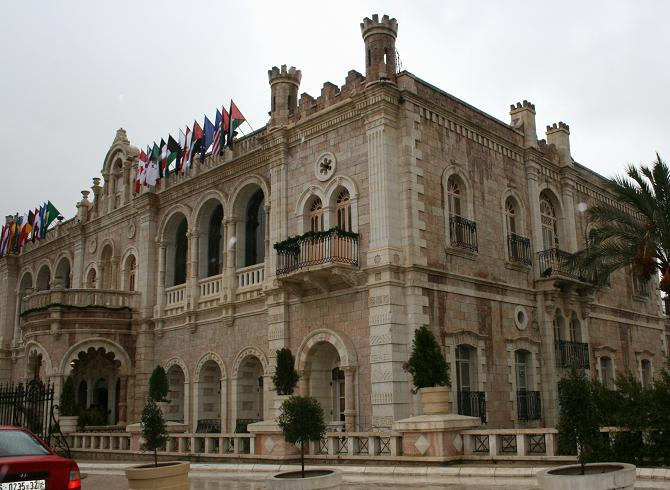
Jacir Palace on Christmas Day 2008

Jacir Palace or Qasr Jacir (Arabic: قصر جاسر) is the largest hotel in Bethlehem in the central West Bank, Palestine. The building's original design was based on typical Palestinian architecture. Jacir Palace has three floors, each spanning 800 sq m. The newly built hotel added an outdoor swimming pool, a health spa, two meeting rooms, 250 rooms, and 11 food and beverage outlets, including restaurants and bars.

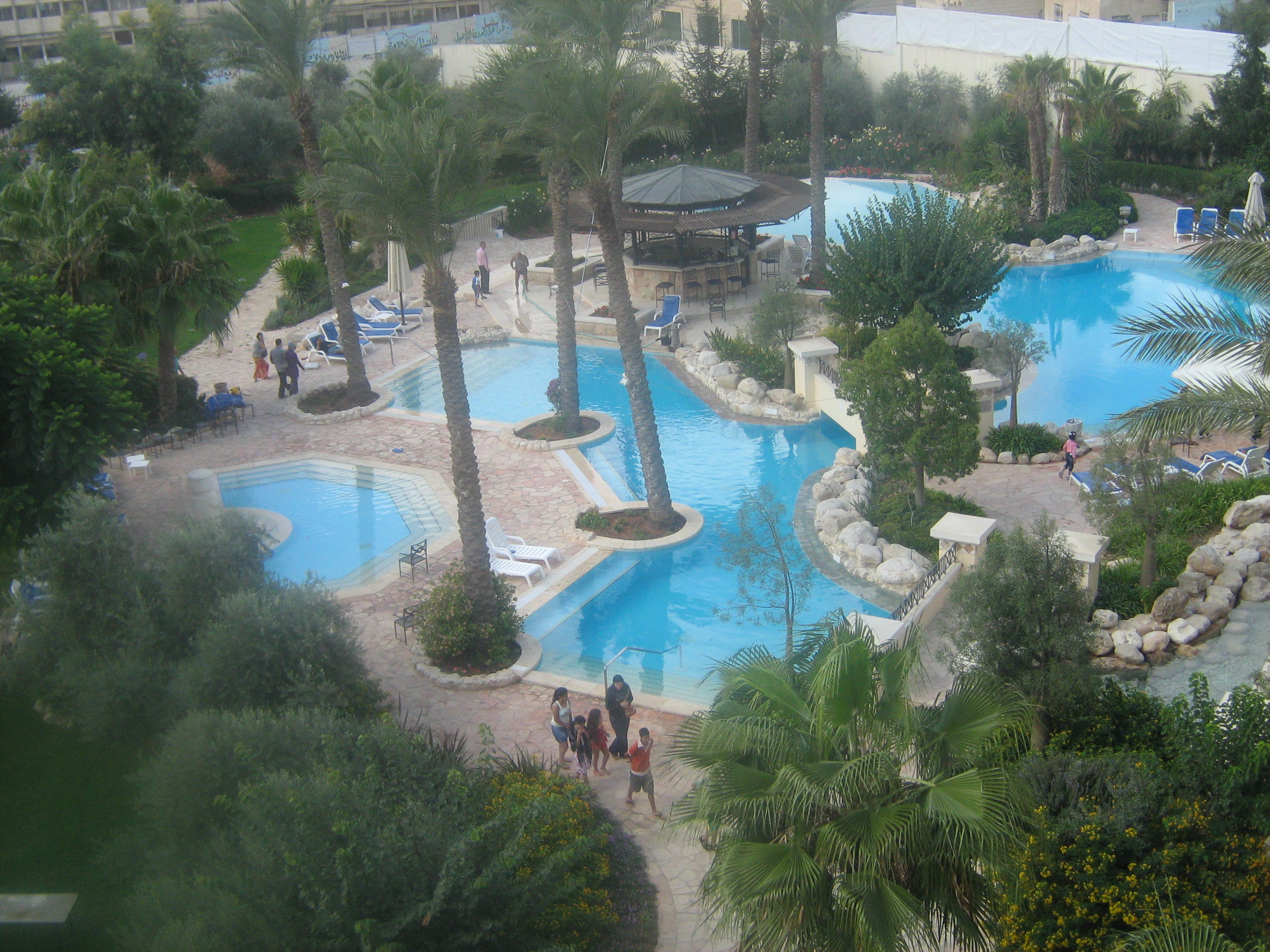
Jacir Palace pool

Jacir Palace was built in 1910 by local craftsmen on commission of the former mayor of Bethlehem, also a merchant, Suleiman Jacir (great-grandfather of Nasri, Emily, and Annemarie Jacir), who intended that he and his five brothers’ families would live in the mansion together. So they did for a time; however, the family went bankrupt in the 1920s and were forced to sell the palace and its furniture. Jacir Palace was eventually taken over by the British, who used it as a women's prison in the 1940s. In the 1950s it was a private school called al-Ummah. Later, the house became a public boys school, and at a still later stage was transformed into a public girls' school. The house was also used by the Israel Defence Forces as a point of control, particularly during the First Intifada, and continued to be a major point of confrontation between locals and the IDF.

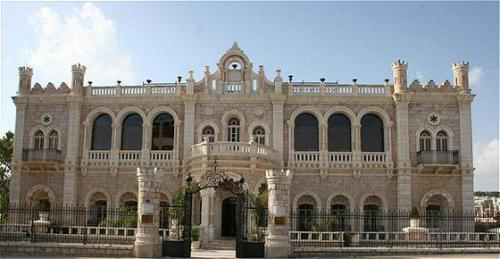
Jacir Palace Hotel

In 2000, a group of Palestinian investors belonging to PEDCAR — which is linked to the Palestinian National Authority — acquired Jacir Palace; they refurbished and renovated it soon after. Billionaire investor Munib il Masri, father of filmmaker Mai Masri, now owns the Palace. However, the hotel was closed down from 2000 to 2005. It closed again in 2021 because of the COVID-19 pandemic, and remains closed as of January 2023.

== See also ==
- Abd al-Hadi Palace
- Aida Camp
- Orient House
- The Walled Off Hotel
