= Aida Camp =

Palestinian refugee camp

Aida
- Refugee camp

Arabic transcription(s)
  - Arabic: مخيم عايده
  - Latin: 'Ayda (official)
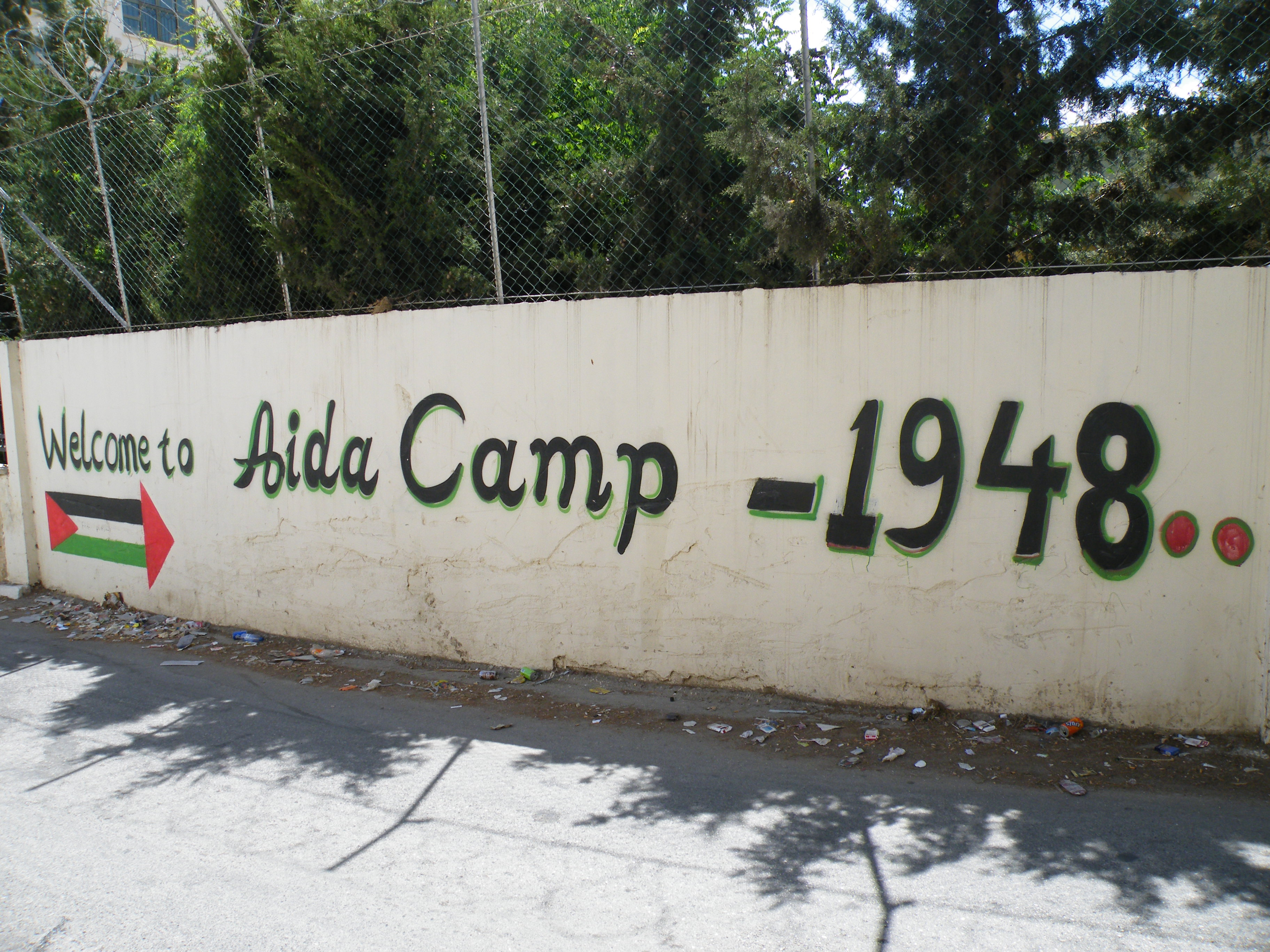
- Mural at the entrance to Aida camp

- Location of Aida within Palestine
- Coordinates: 31°43′10″N 35°11′56″E
- State: State of Palestine
- Governorate: Bethlehem

Government
  - Type: Refugee camp (from 1950)

Area
  - Total: 0.071 km^{2} (0.027 sq mi)

Population (2017)
  - Total: 2,824
  - Density: 40,000/km^{2} (100,000/sq mi)

Aida (Arabic: مخيم عايده), also spelled 'Ayda, is a Palestinian refugee camp situated 2 kilometres (1.2 mi) north of the historic centre of Bethlehem and 1 km (0.62 mi) north of Beit Jala, in the central West Bank, State of Palestine. It is located within the Bethlehem Governorate.

== Name ==
The name "Aida" comes from the name of the original owner of the land, on which she built a coffee shop of the same name. Aida helped some of the original Palestinian families when they fled to the area by providing them with food, blankets, coffee, and tea. "Aida" is similar to the Arabic verb meaning "to return", so the residents kept the name.

== Description ==
Aida Camp is adjacent to 'Azza camp and Rachel's Tomb, and is walled off from Jerusalem by the Israeli West Bank barrier on the northern and eastern edges of the camp. Checkpoint 300 is the nearest access point to enter Jerusalem. The camp is near the Israeli settlements of Gilo and Har Homa. It is also adjacent to the Jacir Palace hotel and Walled Off Hotel, and near Bethlehem University and the Palestine Museum of Natural History.

Aida Camp is largely made up of 3- or 4-story cement buildings, which were erected to accommodate the camp's high population density (on average, about 90,000 people per square kilometer). One study described Aida as "[having] the appearance of a densely populated urban slum." Some buildings are considered unsafe because the foundations were not built to support more than two floors. Residents say there is little privacy in the camp because everyone lives so close together. The homes in the camp do not have street addresses, so people navigate based on the names of the families that live in each neighborhood, as well as on landmarks like Walid's supermarket or the Key of Return (entrance gate).

According to the UNRWA, the camp had a population of approximately 5,498 refugees at the end of 2014. According to the 2017 Palestinian census, the camp had a population of 2,824 residents. In 2023, the UNRWA counted 7,244 residents, including 2,479 children.

Atop the camp's entrance gate is a massive sculpture of a key, created at a Nakba Day commemoration by local residents and the Aida Youth Center. The key, called the Key of Return, symbolizes the Palestinian right of return; its shape is based on the old skeleton keys that many Palestinian families keep as a reminder of their goal, to return to the homes they lived in before they were displaced.

On the separation barrier, there are many pieces of street art, including graffiti and murals. One large mural has been painted with the words "Gernika 1936 – Palestina 1948".

As of 2023, the camp contains two schools: Aida Basic Boys’ School, which had 449 students in 2023, and a girls' school run by the UNRWA. There is one health clinic, which was established in 2020 by the UNRWA with funding from the Saudi Development Fund. Prior to the establishment of the clinic, the UNRWA provided assistance for physicians and physiotherapists to provide medical assistance within the camp, with a clinic located in Beit Jala.

Like many refugees in Palestine, access to water and sanitation are often disrupted for Aida's residents. They are not allowed to dig a well or collect rainwater, so they rely on water purchased from companies like Mekorot, and they store tap water in tanks and cisterns during periodic allowances from the Israeli government. Sewerage is poor, although the camp does have a sewer system that is connected to Beit Jala's sewage network, which then connects to the West Jerusalem system.

There is no central sanitary landfill in Aida Camp, largely because the appropriate area to build one is in Israeli-controlled Area C, and Israeli officials will not approve the construction. Street cleaning and trash pickup are handled by the UNRWA and are sometimes disrupted by labour strikes.

The unemployment rate in Aida stands at 43%.

There is no ground space for agriculture in the camp. However, the Lajee Center has rooftop vegetable gardens as part of a food sovereignty initiative.

== Culture ==
Aida is the location of the Al Rowwad Cultural and Theatre Training Center and the Lajee Youth Center, both of which practice cultural and creative forms of resistance. Refugees in Aida camp have practiced predominantly non-violent opposition to the Israeli occupation. The Lajee Center is located just outside the camp, next to the entrance gate.

The situation for youth in Aida Camp was publicised in Flying Home, an illustrated children's book produced by Lajee Center in 2009. Lajee Center later produced a book called The Aida Camp Alphabet in 2014. Amahl Bishara wrote a children's book about life in the camp, called The Boy and the Wall.

Irish musician MayKay volunteered at the Lajee Center in 2021, working with Palestinian children to write and record a charity single called "We Are". Proceeds from purchases and streaming went to the Lajee Center. The Lajee Center also offers oud lessons and has a youth dabka troupe. and the Al Rowwad Center offers yoga classes.

Sports such as football are popular in the camp. The UNRWA and Lajee Center partnered to build a football pitch (as well as a playground) in 2016. Children sometimes come to the camp from East Jerusalem to play at the facility. The Lajee Celtic football club, also known as Aida Celtic, established in 2019 and supported by the Green Brigade, provides Palestinians with football equipment, facilities, and training. Their football academy was established in 2023. There is a girls' football team that was launched by Aida Youth Club and the Udd Sports Union. Some of its players have joined the national team, and some competed at the 2024 West Asian Football Championship for girls in Saudi Arabia.

In 2020, boxer Ainle O Caireallain helped set up a gym in the Lajee Center called ACLAI Palestine. In 2025, Northern Ireland boxer Tyrone McKenna became a boxing coach at ACLAI Palestine, and wore boxing shorts imprinted with the name of the camp at a match.

Also in 2025, Al Rowwad launched the International Rubik’s Cube Competition – Bethlehem 2025, a Rubik's Cube competition registered with the World Cube Association (WCA). This was the second international Rubik's Cube competition held in Aida Camp.

The Al Rowwad Cultural and Theatre Training Centre has facilitated numerous cultural events, classes, and exhibitions in the camp, including a 2011 showing of Shakespeare's The Tempest, and Luke Jerram's Museum of the Moon. They also provide a community kitchen.

The community holds a Nakba Day commemoration every year on 15 May.

The camp's children play video games at a local computer and PlayStation arcade set up by a resident.

The Key of Return Shop in the camp sells jewelry and art pieces by a local artist who connects and transforms tear gas canisters fired by the Israeli military.

== History ==
Aida Camp was established by the United Nations in 1950 to accommodate Palestinian refugees from the Jerusalem and Hebron areas who were displaced by the 1948 Palestinian expulsion and flight as part of the 1948 Palestine war. Many modern residents of the camp are descendents of those who fled from villages like Bayt Nattif which were depopulated during this time. Some of the refugees had been taking shelter in caves nearby for months or even years before moving into the camp. The camp covered an area of 66 dunams (0.17 square kilometres) and housed 1,125 refugees living in 94 tents. Many residents stayed in tents and did not accept permanent housing structures for five to ten years, because they feared permanent housing would make it more difficult for them to obtain support in moving back to their original homes. Residents eventually began to move into shacks, then UN-provided cement rooms, then the apartment buildings that exist today.

The camp came under special hardship during the Second Intifada of the 2000s, when the school sustained severe damage and 29 housing units were destroyed by Israeli military incursions. The Israeli military placed the camp and surrounding areas under curfew, made arrests and demolished walls between houses in order to bypass the roads in the camp. In one such maneuver, camp resident Huda Hawaja was mortally wounded when Israeli soldiers demolished her doors, and died after there were delays in calling an ambulance due to the military presence. The incident was documented by embedded journalists and broadcast on Channel 2, leading to a public outcry and backlash from the Israeli military against the press.

When the West Bank barrier was erected, it separated one family from the rest of Aida Camp, isolating them in Jerusalem. Israeli authorities refused to grant the family Jerusalem citizenship, and so they were forced to move through checkpoints to access basic needs and connect with their community.

Pope Benedict XVI visited the refugee camp during his Middle East pilgrimage visit to Jordan, Israel and the Palestinian territories in May 2009. He said that the refugees lived in "precarious and difficult conditions" and that "It is tragic to see walls still being erected".

On 29 October 2015, at dusk, a video filmed on his iPhone by a resident of the Aida camp, 17-year-old Yazan Ikhlayel captured a megaphone address made from an Israeli military vehicle during a raid into the camp. The speaker warned residents that if they threw stones at the car, "we will hit you with gas until you all die. The children, the youth and the old people, you will all die. We won't leave any of you alive". "We have arrested one of you," he continued; "He's with us now. We took him from his home and we will slaughter and kill him while you watch if you keep throwing stones. Go home or we will gas you until you die. Your family, your children, everyone. We will kill you". After the incident, the Israeli Border Police said it had suspended the officer suspected in the incident, and would review his continued service in the force.

In 2018, the Human Rights Center at the UC Berkeley School of Law released a study that said that Aida Camp was the most tear-gassed place in the world, with some residents reporting that Israeli military forces deployed tear gas against them 2 to 3 times per week for over a year. Residents describe mentally "getting used to" tear gas, although they are also deeply concerned by its potential health impacts–especially on the children in the camp, who are exposed to the gas nearly as much as the adults are.

As of May 2023, the camp is home to Palestinians who were expelled from the villages of Abu Gosh, Agoor, al-Emoor, al-Malha, al-Qabu, al-Ramlah, al-Walajah, Alar, Az-Zakariyya, Beersheba, Beit Awn, Beit-Jebreen, Beit-Maser, Bayt Nattif, Dayr Aban, Dayr Ayyub, Eraq-Almnshea, Jarash, Kholildah, Rafat, Ras Abu 'Ammar, and Sharafat, as well as their descendents.

=== COVID-19 pandemic (2020–) ===
In March 2020, the city of Bethlehem–including refugee camps like Aida–went into lockdown after several cases of COVID-19 were confirmed in the community.

During the COVID-19 pandemic, the Al Rowwad Cultural and Theatre Training Center began providing free food to the community.

=== Gaza war (2023–) ===
During the 2020s Gaza war, there were increased Israeli military incursions into the camp, with one resident saying they take place multiple times per week. Some residents have been beaten, arrested, or killed during military raids on the camp. Water access became more difficult for residents, who reported that they had access to water in their homes less than once per week. Residents also reported that the Israeli military has broken into the Lajee Youth Center several times during the war, and that Israeli forces removed the Palestinian flag from the roof more than once. UNRWA experienced a worsening financial crisis, contributing to deteriorating conditions for refugees across the West Bank.

One morning in late 2025, children arriving at the football field found notices from the Israeli military saying that all activities at the site must stop and that it would be demolished because it was built without the proper permits. Some other sites in Aida Camp, including a garden and a local theatre, received similar notices at the same time. According to a Bethlehem Municipality council member, the land the football field was built on was leased to the local authority from the Armenian Patriarchate of Jerusalem, and that the land was a dirt football field "long before the current facility was built".

== Sister cities ==
- Nogent-sur-Oise, France (since 2009)
- Strasbourg, France (since 2025)

== Gallery ==
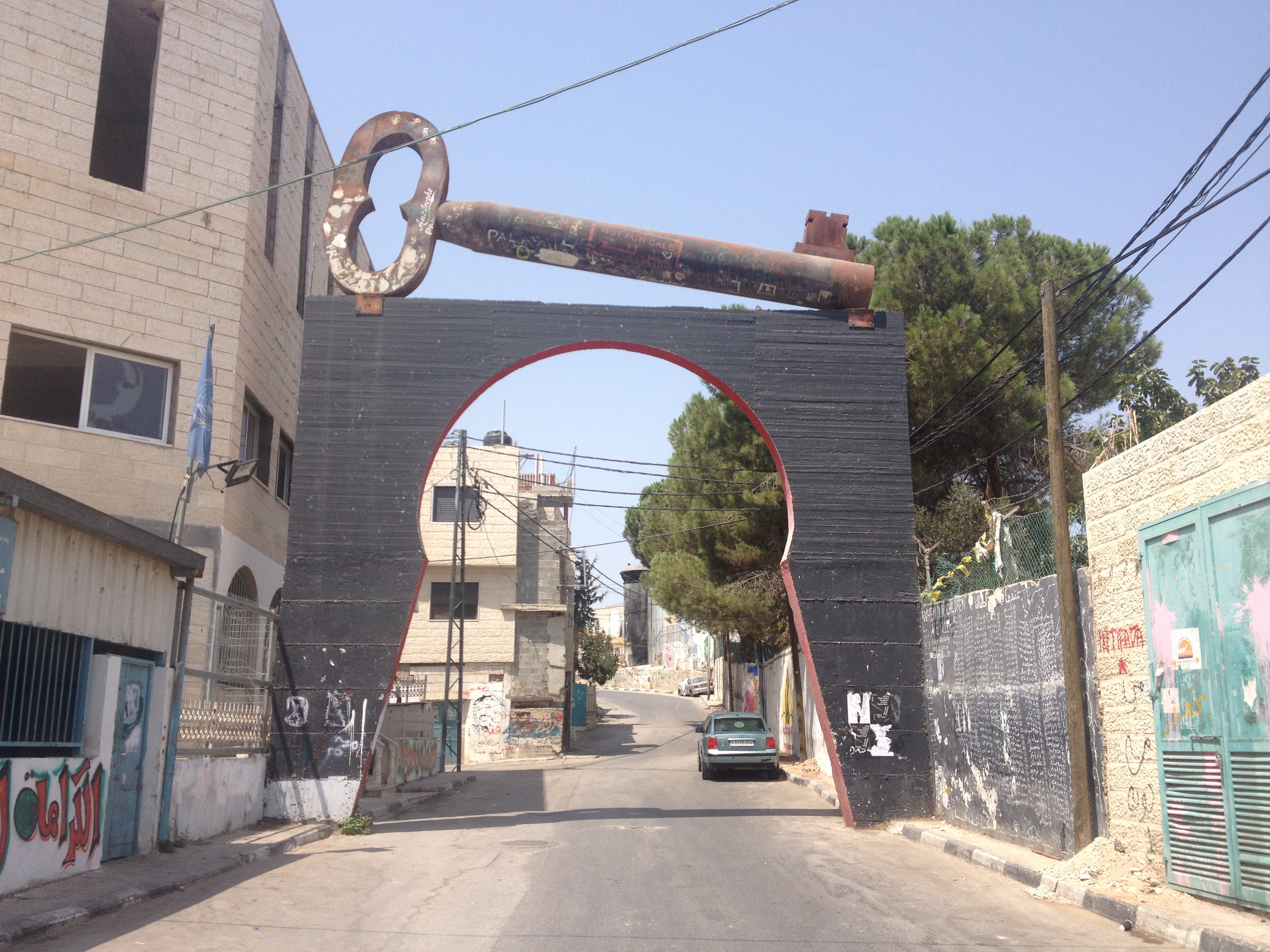
The gate of Aida Camp features the Palestinian key of return.

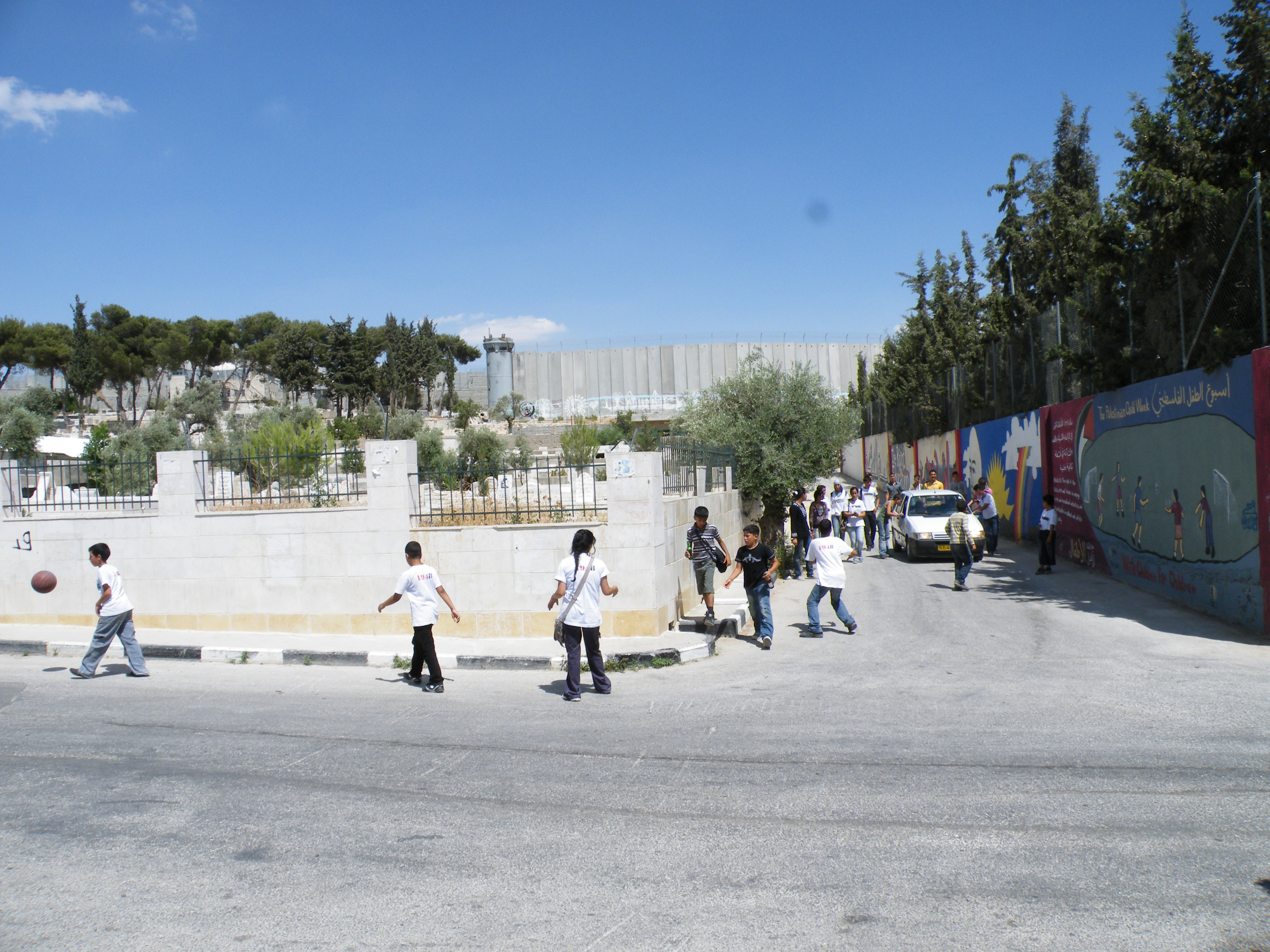
Children returning home to Aida Camp from school, with the Israeli separation barrier in the background

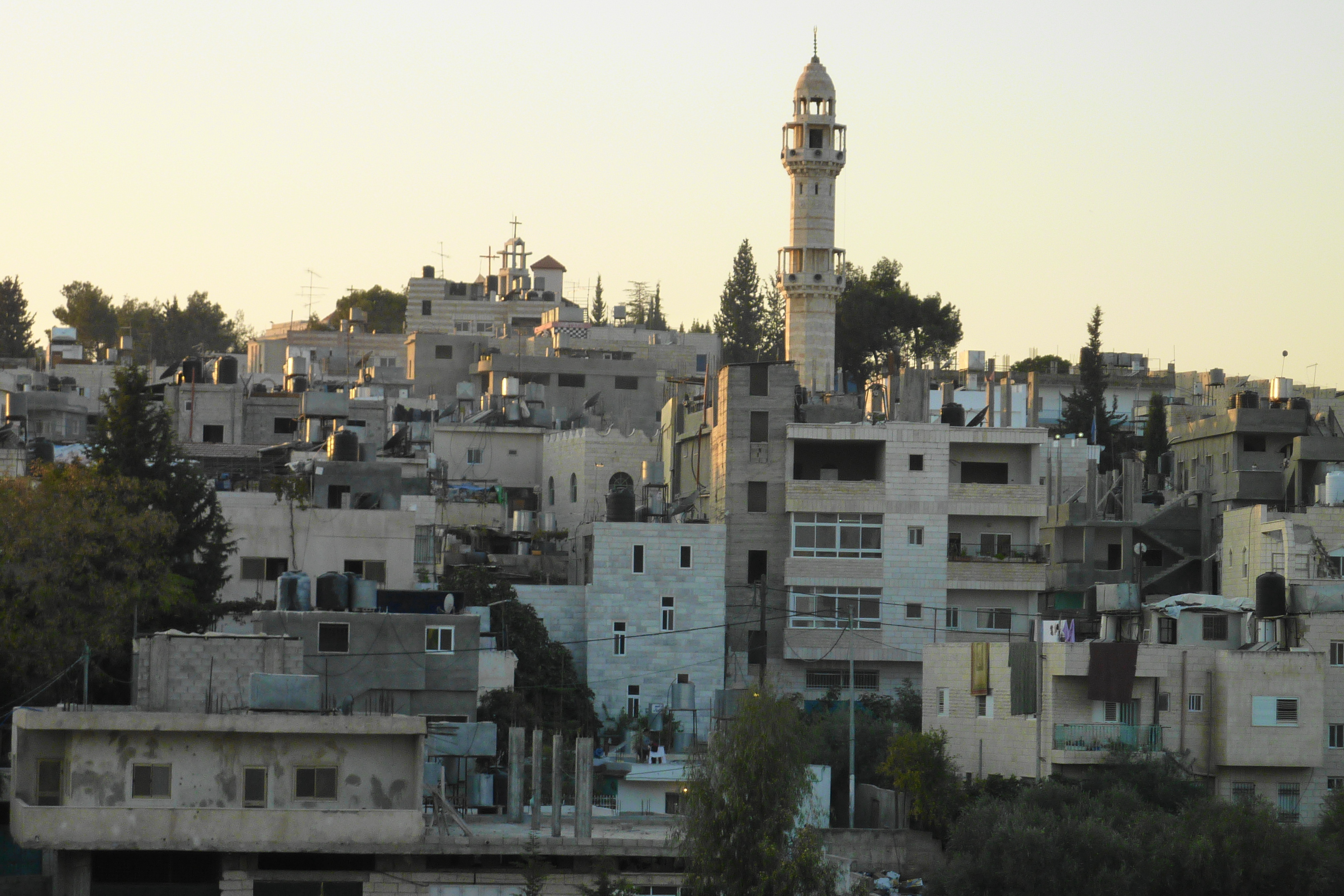
Aida Camp in 2010

== See also ==
- 'Azza
- Al-Arroub (camp)
- Dheisheh
