= Nibal Thawabteh =

Palestinian women's rights activist

Nibal Thawabteh (Arabic: نبال ثوابتة) is a Palestinian women's rights activist who works at Birzeit University.

== Life ==
Thawabteh was the first woman to be elected to the Beit Fajjar Village Council, where she served for seven years. She developed her own training manual and volunteered to help other women get seats in the council. In 2005 she founded the monthly newspaper Al Hal (meaning The Situation), which addresses controversial issues including incest, polygamy, honor killings, illegal marriages, lesbianism and the plight of the poor. In 2008 she was the newspaper's editor-in-chief and a contributing writer. For the first issue of the newspaper, a photo of Amina Abbas, the wife of Mahmoud Abbas, was used on the cover, creating much controversy; according to Nibal, the photo was the first time Amina appeared in public. Nibal has also drawn attention to social issues through writing TV screenplays on subjects including the plight of illiterate women and writing and producing documentaries on subjects including suicide among Palestinian women. She has also taught investigative reporting and creative writing.

Nibal received a 2008 International Women of Courage Award.

In 2015 she was the Director of Birzeit University's Media Development Center who was concerned with the National media policy of Palestine.
