= Umm Salamuna =

- Municipality type D (Village council)

Arabic transcription(s)
  - Arabic: خربة ام سلمونة
  - Latin: Um Salmonah (official); Kirbat Umm Salamunah (unofficial)
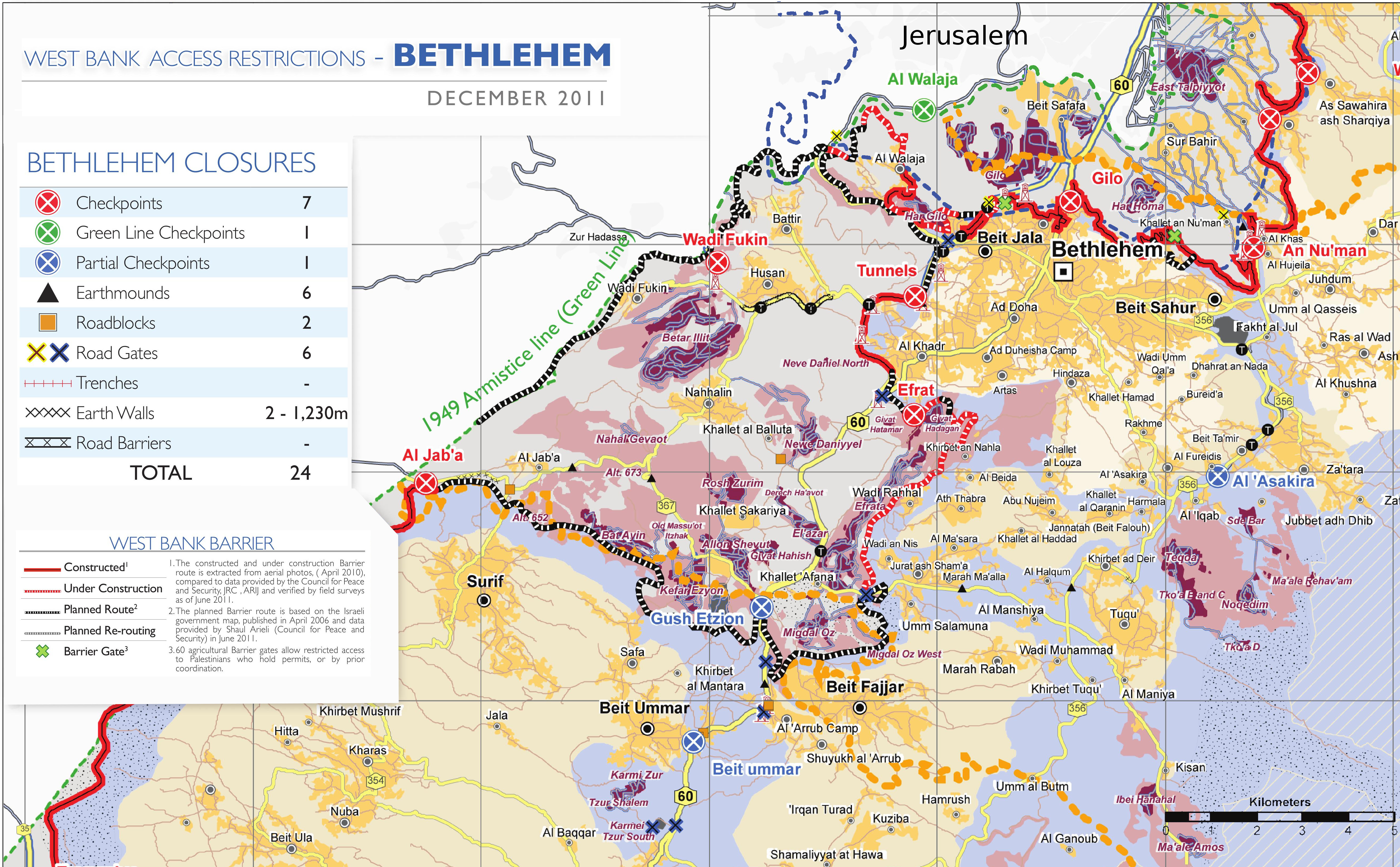
- Area map, showing Umm Salamunu, north of Beit Fajjar, in 2011

- Location of Umm Salamuna within Palestine
- Coordinates: 31°38′36″N 35°10′05″E
- Palestine grid: 166/116
- State: State of Palestine
- Governorate: Bethlehem

Government
  - Type: Village council

Population (2017)
  - Total: 1,188
- Name meaning: Umm Salamôni, the ruin of the mother of Salamôni

Umm Salamuna (Arabic: خربة ام سلمونة) is a Palestinian village located twelve kilometers south-west of Bethlehem. The village is in the Bethlehem Governorate in the southern West Bank. According to the Palestinian Central Bureau of Statistics, the village had a population of 1,188 in 2017. The primary healthcare is obtained in Beit Fajjar, where the Ministry of Health has classified the care facilities as level 3.

== History ==
=== Ottoman era ===
In 1883, the PEF's Survey of Western Palestine noted "heaps of stones" at Kh. Umm Salamôni.

=== British Mandate era ===
In the 1931 census the population of Umm Salamuna was counted together with Beit Fajjar, Marah Ma'alla and Marah Rabah. The total population was 1043, all Muslims, in 258 houses.

=== Jordanian era ===
In the wake of the 1948 Arab–Israeli War and after the 1949 Armistice Agreements, Umm Salumuna came under Jordanian rule.

In 1961, the population was 118.

=== Post-1967 ===
Since the Six-Day War in 1967, Umm Salamuna has been held under Israeli occupation.

After the 1995 accords, 20.2% of Umm Salamuna land was classified as Area B, while the remaining 79.8% was classified as Area C. Israel has planned that 326 dunams of village land (or 14.9 percent of the total area of Umm Salamuna) will be isolated from the village on the Israeli side of the West Bank barrier.

== Bibliography ==
- Conder, C.R.; Kitchener, H.H. (1883). The Survey of Western Palestine: Memoirs of the Topography, Orography, Hydrography, and Archaeology. Vol. 3. London: Committee of the Palestine Exploration Fund.
- Government of Jordan, Department of Statistics (1964). First Census of Population and Housing. Volume I: Final Tables; General Characteristics of the Population (PDF).
- Mills, E., ed. (1932). Census of Palestine 1931. Population of Villages, Towns and Administrative Areas. Jerusalem: Government of Palestine.
- Palmer, E.H. (1881). The Survey of Western Palestine: Arabic and English Name Lists Collected During the Survey by Lieutenants Conder and Kitchener, R. E. Transliterated and Explained by E.H. Palmer. Committee of the Palestine Exploration Fund.
