= Beit Fajjar =

- Municipality type B

Arabic transcription(s)
  - Arabic: بيت فجّار
  - Latin: Bayt Fajjar (official); Beit Fujar (unofficial)
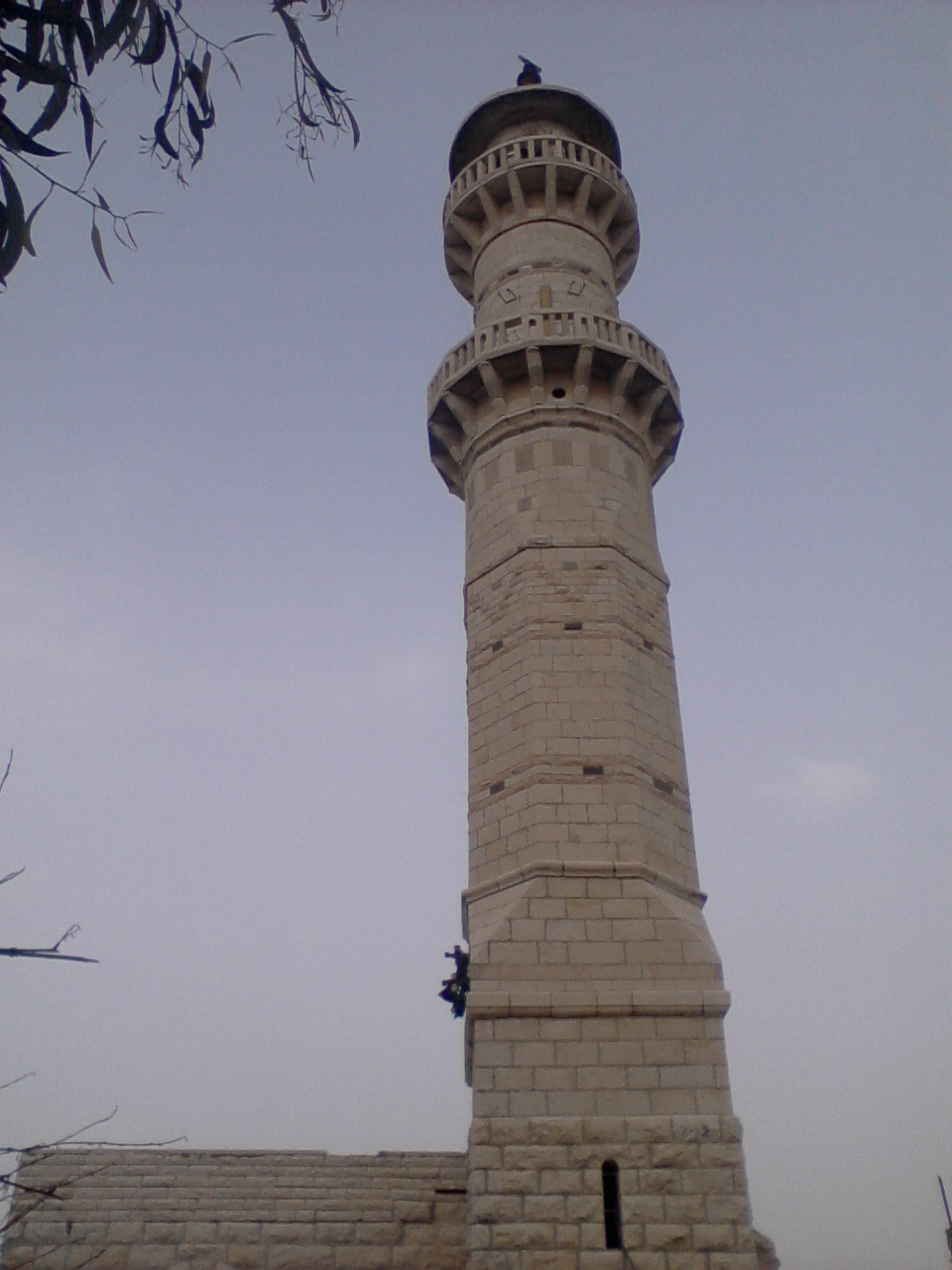
- Minaret in Beit Fajjar

- Location of Beit Fajjar within Palestine
- Coordinates: 31°37′29″N 35°09′20″E
- Palestine grid: 164/114
- State: State of Palestine
- Governorate: Bethlehem

Government
  - Type: Municipality
  - Head of Municipality: Umar Abdel Aziz Taqatqa

Area
  - Total: 7.9 km^{2} (3.1 sq mi)

Population (2017)
  - Total: 13,520
  - Density: 1,700/km^{2} (4,400/sq mi)
- Name meaning: Relating to Umar ibn al-Khaṭṭāb

Beit Fajjar (Arabic: بيت فجّار) is a Palestinian town located eight kilometers south of Bethlehem in the Bethlehem Governorate, in the central West Bank. According to the Palestinian Central Bureau of Statistics, the town had a population of over 13,520 in 2017.

Beit Fajjar was founded in the 18th century.

== History ==
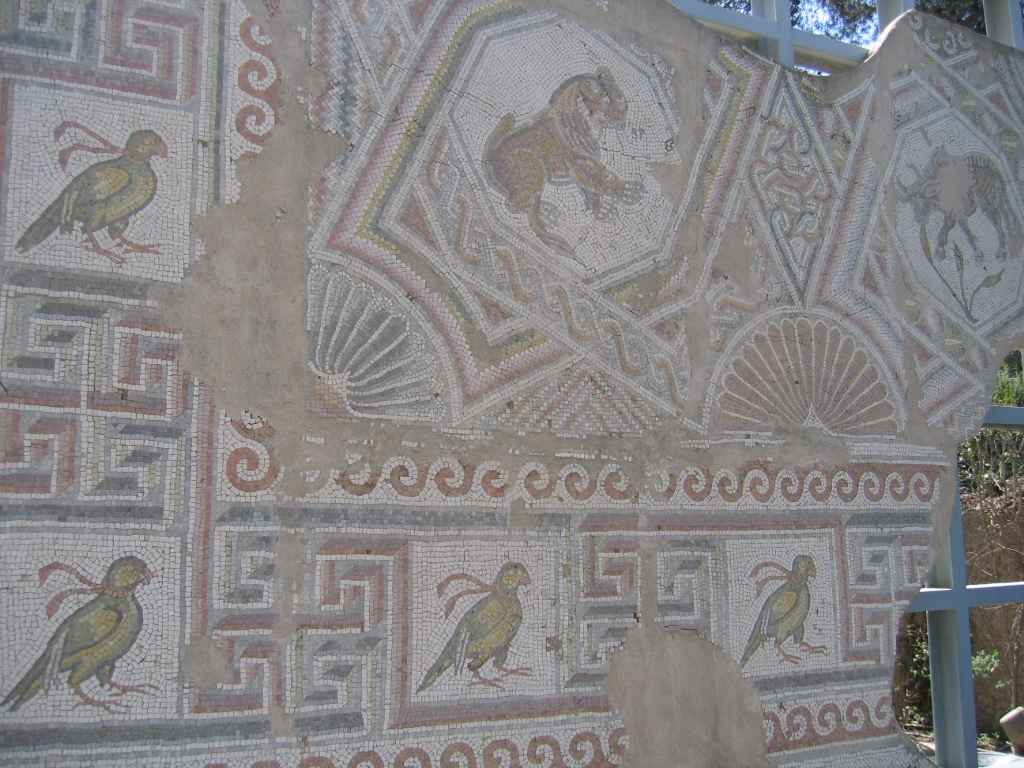
Mosaic from a Byzantine Church dating from the 5th century, from Kh. Breikut, just north of Beit Fajjar, and west of Umm Salamuna

A tomb, dating from about the time of Constantine the Great, or the 4th century C.E, have been excavated here.

Beit Fajjar is believed to have been a camping area for the Islamic Caliph, Umar ibn al-Khattab.

=== Ottoman era ===
According to the people of Beit Fajjar, they came from Bethlehem due to a conflict in the town, and settled at Beit Fajjar in 1784, or 1738.

Edward Robinson noted the village on his travels in the area in 1838, as a Muslim village in the Hebron district. According to Kark and Oren-Nordheim, Beit Fajjar was mostly farmland until the 19th century, when it gradually transformed into an urban settlement. The residents were descendants to a semi-nomadic family from the Hauran. The lands formerly belonged to the village of Buraikut.

Victor Guérin visited the village in 1863, and described it as a village on the top of a hill, with about 400 people. The villagers still buried their dead in rock-cut tombs, below the village. An Ottoman village list of about 1870 indicated 27 houses and a population of 81, though the population count included only men.

In the 1883, the PEF's Survey of Western Palestine, Beit Fejjar was described as a "small stone village standing very high on a ridge. It is supplied by the fine springs and spring wells of Wady el Arrub".

In a source from 1896, the population of "Bēt faddschār" (German transcription of the placename) was estimated to be about 624 persons.

=== British Mandate era ===
The site's high altitude was the highest point in the area and later the town expanded into other hills. During British rule in Palestine in the 1920s-1940s, Beit Fajjar was used as an observation point for the Bethlehem-Hebron area.

In the 1922 census of Palestine conducted by the British Mandate authorities, Bait Fajjar (alternative spelling) had a population 766, all Muslims. In the 1931 census the population of Beit Fajjar was counted together with Umm Salamuna, Marah Ma'alla and Marah Rabah. The total population was 1043, still all Muslims, in 258 houses.

In the 1945 statistics the population of Beit Fajjar was 1,480, all Muslims, who owned 17,292 dunams of land according to an official land and population survey. 2,572 dunams were plantations and irrigable land, 2,633 for cereals, while 87 dunams were built-up (urban) land.

=== Jordanian era ===
In the wake of the 1948 Arab–Israeli War, and after the 1949 Armistice Agreements, Beit Fajjar came under Jordanian rule.

In 1961, the population was 2,182.

=== After 1967 ===
Since the Six-Day War in 1967, Beit Fajjar has been under Israeli occupation. The population in the 1967 census conducted by the Israeli authorities was 2,474.

The former head of Beit Fajjar's local council, Saber Mohammed Abdul Latif, testified to United Nations representatives that after his arrest on November 1, 1969, how Beit Fajjar had been besieged for about four months, no water had been allowed in and some 70 houses had been blown up. Abdul Latif was then deported on August 28, 1970.

After the 1995 accords, 85.7% of Beit Fajjar land was classified as Area B land, while the remaining 14.3% is Area C.

Nibal Thawabteh was the first woman to be elected to the Beit Fajjar Village Council, where she served for seven years.

== Economy ==
The primary economic sectors are agriculture and stone-cutting. Beit Fajjar is a major player in the stone industry, supplying meleke, widely known as Jerusalem stone, used in the construction of buildings in Israel and the Palestinian territories. There are 138 stone production outlets in Beit Fajjar, out of 650 in the West Bank. After about 1998, the Palestinian quarry owners have experienced difficulties in renewing their permits. According to HRW, while "Israel issued a permit to the European company to operate the quarry on an area of land that Israel declared belongs to the state, Israel has refused to issue permits for nearly all of the 40 or so Beit Fajar quarries, or for almost any other Palestinian-owned quarry in the area of the West Bank under Israel’s administrative control."

== Arab-Israeli conflict ==
On 4 October 2010, a mosque in Beit Fajjar was attacked by arsonists, who doused carpets with kerosene and ignited them at approximately 3am local time. The attackers left a "Star of David symbol and the words 'Price Tag'" over the doorway; the slogan is associated with militant Israeli settlers, who Palestinian residents accused of responsibility for the attack. Gush Etzion is close to the village. After the attack, a delegation of Rabbis from the adjacent Jewish settlements arranged with Beit Fajjar leadership and the PA security and visited the mosque in solidarity, while condemning the arson attack. On October 30, 2015, the PA health ministry reported that an 8 month old boy from Beit Fajjar had died after inhaling tear gas fired by the IDF during violent clashes

In July, 2019, 30 (or 31) year old Nassar Taqatqa from Beit Fajjar was found dead in Israeli solitary confinement. He had been arrested by the Israelis six weeks earlier, suspected of "ties to Hamas", but had not been charged with anything. The Palestinian Prisoners’ Society (PPS) and the man’s relatives stated that Taqatqa was a "completely healthy" young man when he was detained by the Israelis. According to IMEMC, the death of Taqatqa brought "the number of [Palestinian] detainees, who were killed or died in Israeli prisons since 1967, to 220."

== Bibliography ==
- Barron, J.B., ed. (1923). Palestine: Report and General Abstracts of the Census of 1922. Government of Palestine.
- Conder, C.R; Kitchener, H.H. (1883). The Survey of Western Palestine: Memoirs of the Topography, Orography, Hydrography, and Archaeology. Vol. 3. London: Committee of the Palestine Exploration Fund.
- Drory, Rina; Drory, Joseph (1979). "The Arabic inscriptions at Horvat Berachot" (PDF). 33. Dumbarton Oaks Papers: 324–326.
- Government of Jordan, Department of Statistics (1964). First Census of Population and Housing. Volume I: Final Tables; General Characteristics of the Population (PDF).
- Government of Palestine, Department of Statistics (1945). Village Statistics, April, 1945.
- Guérin, V. (1869). Description Géographique Historique et Archéologique de la Palestine (in French). Vol. 1: Judee, pt. 3. Paris: L'Imprimerie Nationale.
- Hadawi, S. (1970). Village Statistics of 1945: A Classification of Land and Area ownership in Palestine. Palestine Liberation Organization Research Centre.
- Hartmann, M. (1883). "Die Ortschaftenliste des Liwa Jerusalem in dem türkischen Staatskalender für Syrien auf das Jahr 1288 der Flucht (1871)". Zeitschrift des Deutschen Palästina-Vereins. 6: 102–149.
- Husseini, S.A.S.; Iliffe, J.H. (1935). "A fourth-century A.D. tomb at Beit Fajjar". Quarterly of the Department of Antiquities in Palestine. 4: 175–178.
- Kark, R.; Oren-Nordheim, Michal (2001). Jerusalem and its environs: quarters, neighborhoods, villages, 1800-1948 (Illustrated ed.). Wayne State University Press. ISBN 978-0-8143-2909-2.
- Mills, E., ed. (1932). Census of Palestine 1931. Population of Villages, Towns and Administrative Areas. Jerusalem: Government of Palestine.
- Palmer, E.H. (1881). The Survey of Western Palestine: Arabic and English Name Lists Collected During the Survey by Lieutenants Conder and Kitchener, R. E. Transliterated and Explained by E.H. Palmer. Committee of the Palestine Exploration Fund.
- Robinson, E.; Smith, E. (1841). Biblical Researches in Palestine, Mount Sinai and Arabia Petraea: A Journal of Travels in the year 1838. Vol. 2. Boston: Crocker & Brewster.
- Robinson, E.; Smith, E. (1841). Biblical Researches in Palestine, Mount Sinai and Arabia Petraea: A Journal of Travels in the year 1838. Vol. 3. Boston: Crocker & Brewster.
- Schick, C. (1896). "Zur Einwohnerzahl des Bezirks Jerusalem". Zeitschrift des Deutschen Palästina-Vereins. 19: 120–127.
- Socin, A. (1879). "Alphabetisches Verzeichniss von Ortschaften des Paschalik Jerusalem". Zeitschrift des Deutschen Palästina-Vereins. 2: 135–163.
- Toledano, E. (1984). "The Sanjaq of Jerusalem in the Sixteenth Century: Aspects of Topography and Population". Archivum Ottomanicum. 9: 279–319. Archived from the original on 2016-03-05.
- Tsafrir, Y.; Hirschfeld, Y.; Drory, Rina; Drory, Joseph (1979). "The Church and Mosaics at Ḥorvat Berachot". Dumbarton Oaks Papers. 33: 291–326. doi:10.2307/1291439. JSTOR 1291439.
