= 'Arab al-Rashayida =

Village in West Bank, Palestine

- Municipality type D (Village council)

Arabic transcription(s)
  - Arabic: عرب الرشايدة
  - Latin: al Rashaydeh (official)
- Location of 'Arab al-Rashayida within Palestine
- Coordinates: 31°34′14″N 35°13′58″E
- State: State of Palestine
- Governorate: Bethlehem

Government
  - Type: Village council

Population (2017)
  - Total: 2,060

'Arab al-Rashayida (Arabic: عرب الرشايدة) is a Palestinian village in the Bethlehem Governorate, central West Bank. According to the Palestinian Central Bureau of Statistics, the city had a population of 2,060 in 2017.

== History ==
From the 18th century onwards, the Bedouin tribe of 'Arab al-Rashayida took control of the area descending from Mount Hebron towards Ein Gedi, along the upper channels of the Arugot Strim, in the Rujum a-Naka and the surrounding area.

In the 1970s, the Israeli Military Governorate tried to get the tribe to settle on land inquired from residents of Sa'ir. The relations between the tribe and Sa'ir where tense, as the residents of Sa'ir continude to claim for the ownership of the land assigned the tribe, and the tribe requested permission to leave the place.

After the 1995 accords, 5.7% of al-Rashayida's land was classified as Area A, 1.1% classified as Area B, 10.2% classified as Area C, while the remaining 83% is classified as "nature reserve" under the Palestinian Authority rule.
