= Marah Rabah =

- Municipality type C

Arabic transcription(s)
- Location of Marah Rabah within Palestine
- Coordinates: 31°38′06″N 35°11′19″E
- State: State of Palestine
- Governorate: Bethlehem

Government
  - Type: Municipality

Population (2017)
  - Total: 1,729

Marah Rabah is a Palestinian village located twelve kilometers south of Bethlehem. The village is in the Bethlehem Governorate central West Bank. According to the Palestinian Central Bureau of Statistics, the town had a population of over 1,729 in 2017. The primary healthcare is obtained in Tuqu', where the Ministry of Health denotes the healthcare facilities as level 2.

== History ==
=== British Mandate era ===
In the 1931 census the population of Marah Rabah was counted together with Beit Fajjar, Marah Ma'alla and Umm Salamuna. The total population was 1,043, all Muslims, living in 258 houses.

=== Jordanian era ===
In the wake of the 1948 Arab–Israeli War, and after the 1949 Armistice Agreements, Marah Rabah came under Jordanian rule. In 1961, the population of Murah Rabah was 198.

=== Post 1967 ===
Since the Six-Day War in 1967, Marah Rabah has been held under Israeli occupation.

== Bibliography ==
- Government of Jordan, Department of Statistics (1964). First Census of Population and Housing. Volume I: Final Tables; General Characteristics of the Population (PDF).
- Mills, E., ed. (1932). Census of Palestine 1931. Population of Villages, Towns and Administrative Areas. Jerusalem: Government of Palestine.
