= Wadi al-Arayis =

Wadi al-Arayis وادي العرايس
- Municipality type D (Village council)

Arabic transcription(s)
- Location of Wadi al-Arayis within Palestine
- Coordinates: 31°42′39″N 35°17′4″E
- State: State of Palestine
- Governorate: Bethlehem

Government
  - Type: Village council

Population (2006)
  - Total: 2,169

Wadi al-Arayis (Palestinian Arabic: وادي العرايس, romanized: Wādi l-ʿArāyis, lit. 'Brides' Valley'; Standard Arabic: وادي العرائس, romanized: Wādī l-ʿArāʾis) is a Palestinian village located ten kilometers east of Bethlehem, administratively in the Bethlehem Governorate, southern West Bank. According to the Palestinian Central Bureau of Statistics, the village had a population of 2,169 in mid-year 2006. The primary healthcare is obtained in al 'Ubeidiya where the Ministry of Heath have classified the care facilities as level 3.

== History ==
In the wake of the 1948 Arab–Israeli War, and after the 1949 Armistice Agreements, Wadi Arayis came under Jordanian rule.

In a 1961 census the population of Wadi Arayis was 357.

Since the Six-Day War in 1967, the town has been under Israeli occupation

The population in the 1967 census conducted by the Israeli authorities was 501.

== Bibliography ==
- Government of Jordan, Department of Statistics (1964). First Census of Population and Housing. Volume I: Final Tables; General Characteristics of the Population (PDF).
