= Arayi =

Village in Aragatsotn Province, Armenia

Arayi Արայի
- Location within Armenia Location within Aragatsotn
- Coordinates: 40°27′26″N 44°22′27″E
- Country: Armenia
- Province: Aragatsotn
- Municipality: Aparan

Population (2011)
  - Total: 617
- Time zone: UTC+4
  - Summer (DST): UTC+5

Arayi (Armenian: Արայի) is a village in the Aparan Municipality of the Aragatsotn Province of Armenia. It is home to a ruined caravanserai dating back to 1213.
