= The Walled Off Hotel =

Hotel in Bethlehem, West Bank, Palestine

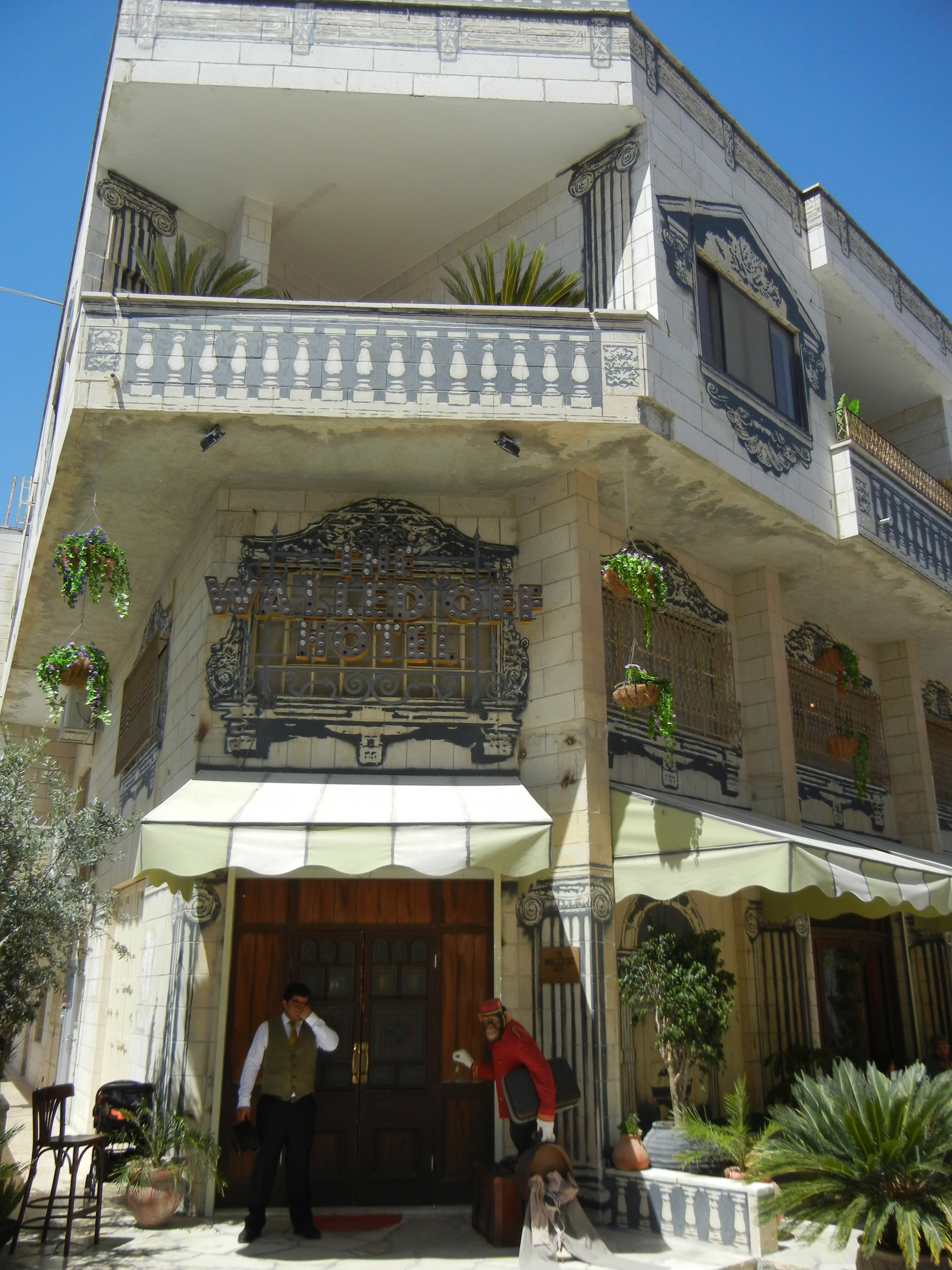
- The building's exterior in 2017
- Interactive map of the The Walled Off Hotel area

General information
- Type: Boutique hotel
- Location: 182 Caritas Street; Bethlehem, Palestine
- Coordinates: 31.7193°N 35.2033°E
- Opened: March 3, 2017

Website
- walledoffhotel.com

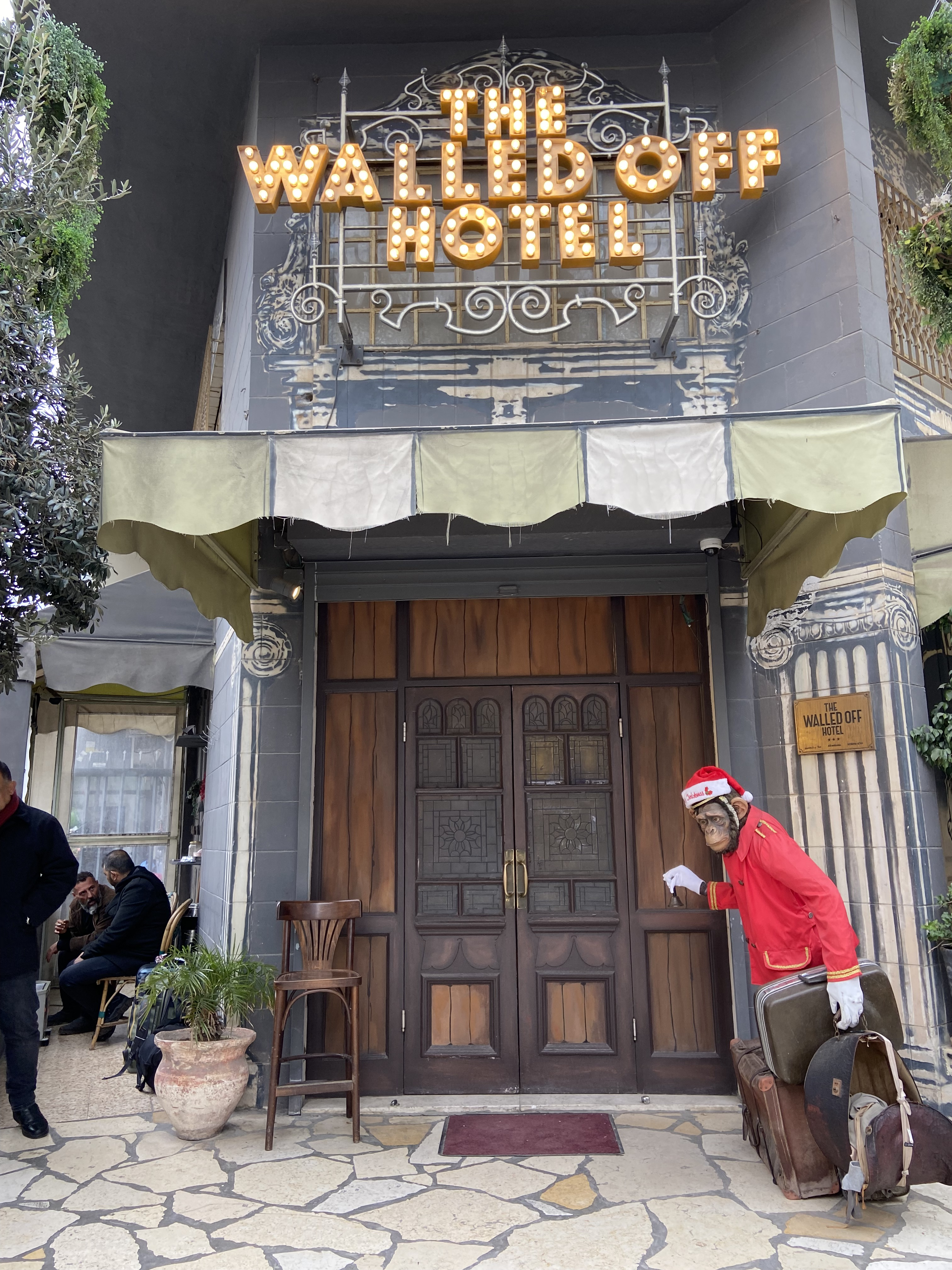

The Walled Off Hotel is a boutique hotel in Bethlehem, West Bank, Palestine. It was designed by anonymous Bristol-born artist Banksy alongside other creatives. Established in March 2017, and initially set out to only be a temporary exhibition and a word play on the Waldorf hotel chain name, the hotel has since attracted nearly 140,000 visitors, thanks in part to its location opposite the portion of the Israeli West Bank Barrier separating Bethlehem from the holy site of Rachel's Tomb.

Established on 3 March 2017, the hotel is generally considered to be a follow-up to Banksy's 2015 Dismaland project, held for five weeks in Weston-Super-Mare in the South-West of England, making a commentary on life in coastal towns in 21st-century Britain. The reaction to the hotel as a work of art and social intervention has been mixed, especially given its location and subject matter. Critics have argued that such a building profits off tragedy, and is a case of war tourism. On the topic of Banksy's Walled Off Hotel in Bethlehem, Palestinian artist and activist Rana Bishara criticized the initiative for commodifying the Israeli separation wall while the real wall remains a source of oppression for Palestinians. Bishara also expressed concern over the potential dehumanization of socially disadvantaged areas like the West Bank due to dark tourism or "tourism of suffering." Nonetheless, evidence has suggested that the hotel has brought more tourism to areas of the West Bank, in turn raising awareness of the realities of the Palestinians affected by the conflict.

CAMERA UK denounced a painting in the hotel of Jesus Christ with a sniper’s red dot sight on his head as in support of the antisemitic belief of Jewish deicide.

In October 2023, the hotel was closed due to the October 7 attacks. It reopened in December 2025.

Nine Inch Nails' Trent Reznor and Atticus Ross wrote 2 songs for the hotel and sanctioned other music for use in the building.
