= Bethlehem Governorate =

Governorate of Palestine

Coordinates: 31.65°N 35.3°E

- Governorate
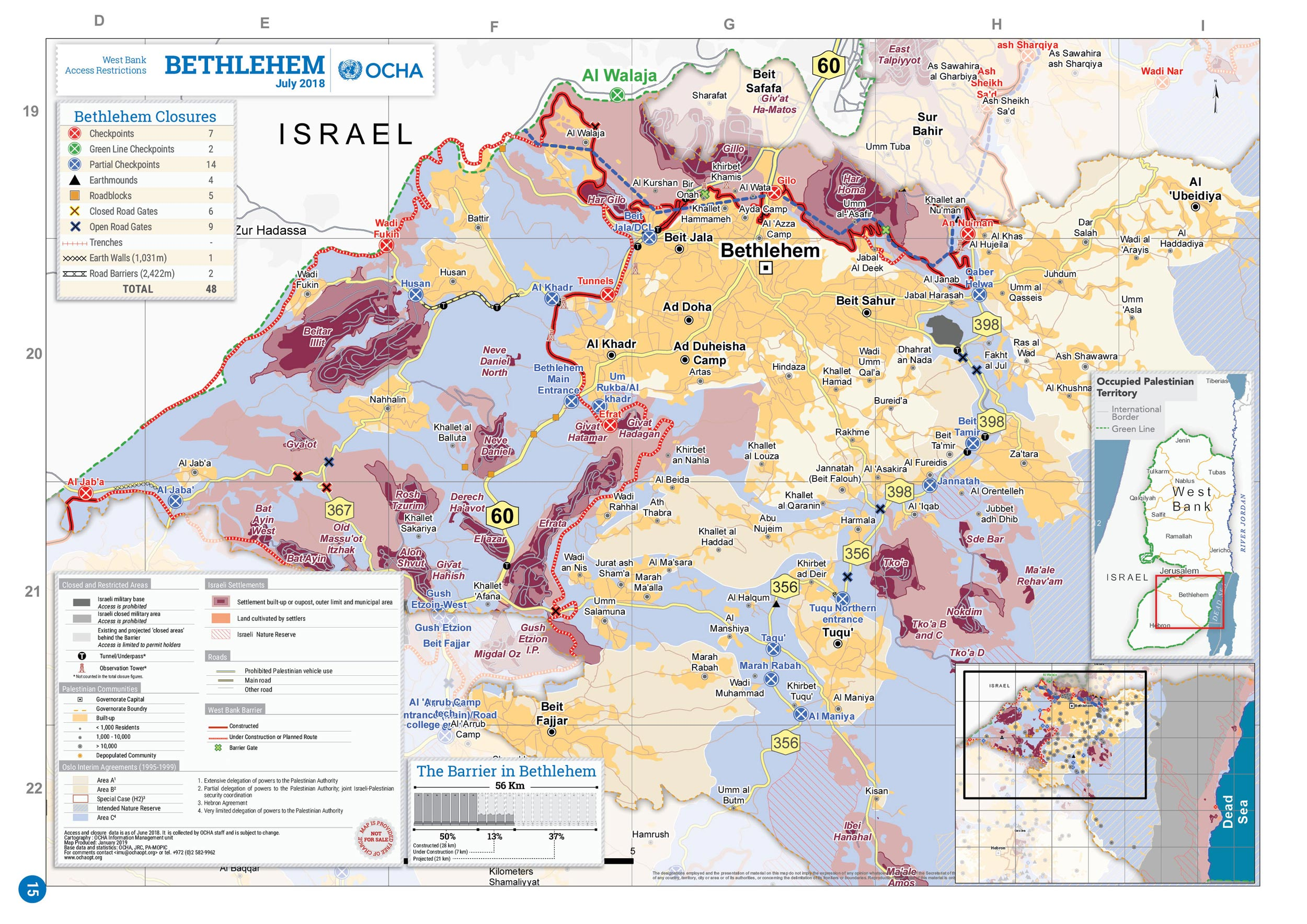
- 2018 United Nations map of the area, showing the Israeli occupation arrangements in the governorate

- Interactive map of Bethlehem Governorate
- Country: Palestine

Area
  - Total: 644 km^{2} (249 sq mi)

Population (2017)
  - Total: 176,515
- This figure excludes the Israeli West Bank Settlements

The Bethlehem Governorate (Arabic: محافظة بيت لحم, romanized: Muḥāfaẓat Bayt Laḥm) is one of 16 governorates of Palestine. It covers an area of the West Bank, south of Jerusalem. Its principal city and district capital is Bethlehem. According to the Palestinian Central Bureau of Statistics, its population was estimated to 199,463 in 2012.

== Geography ==
According to United Nations Office for the Coordination of Humanitarian Affairs (OCHA), the governorate has a total area of around 660 km^{2}.

== Demographics ==
As of the 2017 census, 217,400 people lived in the governorate. There were 188,851 Muslims and 23,165 Christians. In the 2007 census, the population was 176,515. In the 1997 census, the population was 137,286.

== Politics ==
Politically, the Bethlehem Governorate is somewhat of a stronghold of the left. In the 2006 Palestinian legislative election, the Popular Front for the Liberation of Palestine and The Alternative both had their best results. Its governor, appointed March 2024 is Muhammad Taha Hassan Abu Alia, member 45 of the Fatah Revolutionary Council's 2009 Sixth Congress.

== Localities ==
The governorate consists of 10 municipalities, 3 refugee camps, and 58 rural districts.

=== Municipalities ===
- Battir
- Beit Fajjar
- Beit Jala
- Beit Sahour
- Bethlehem
- al-Dawha
- Husan
- al-Khader
- Nahalin
- Tuqu'
- al-Ubeidiya
- Za'atara

=== Local and village councils ===
- 'Arab al-Rashayida
- Artas
- al-Asakra
- Beit Sakariya
- Beit Ta'mir
- Dar Salah
- Hindaza
- Jab'a
- Juhdum
- Jurat ash Sham'a
- Marah Rabah
- Rakhme
- Umm Salamuna
- ash Shawawra
- Wadi al-Arayis
- Wadi Fukin
- al-Walaja

=== Refugee camps ===
- Aida
- 'Azza
- Dheisheh
