= Route 443 (Israel–Palestine) =

Road in Israel

Coordinates: 31°53′54″N 35°02′17″E

Route 443
- כביש 443
- Ascent of Bethoron; Hebrew: מעלה בית חורון, romanized: Ma'ale Beit Horon
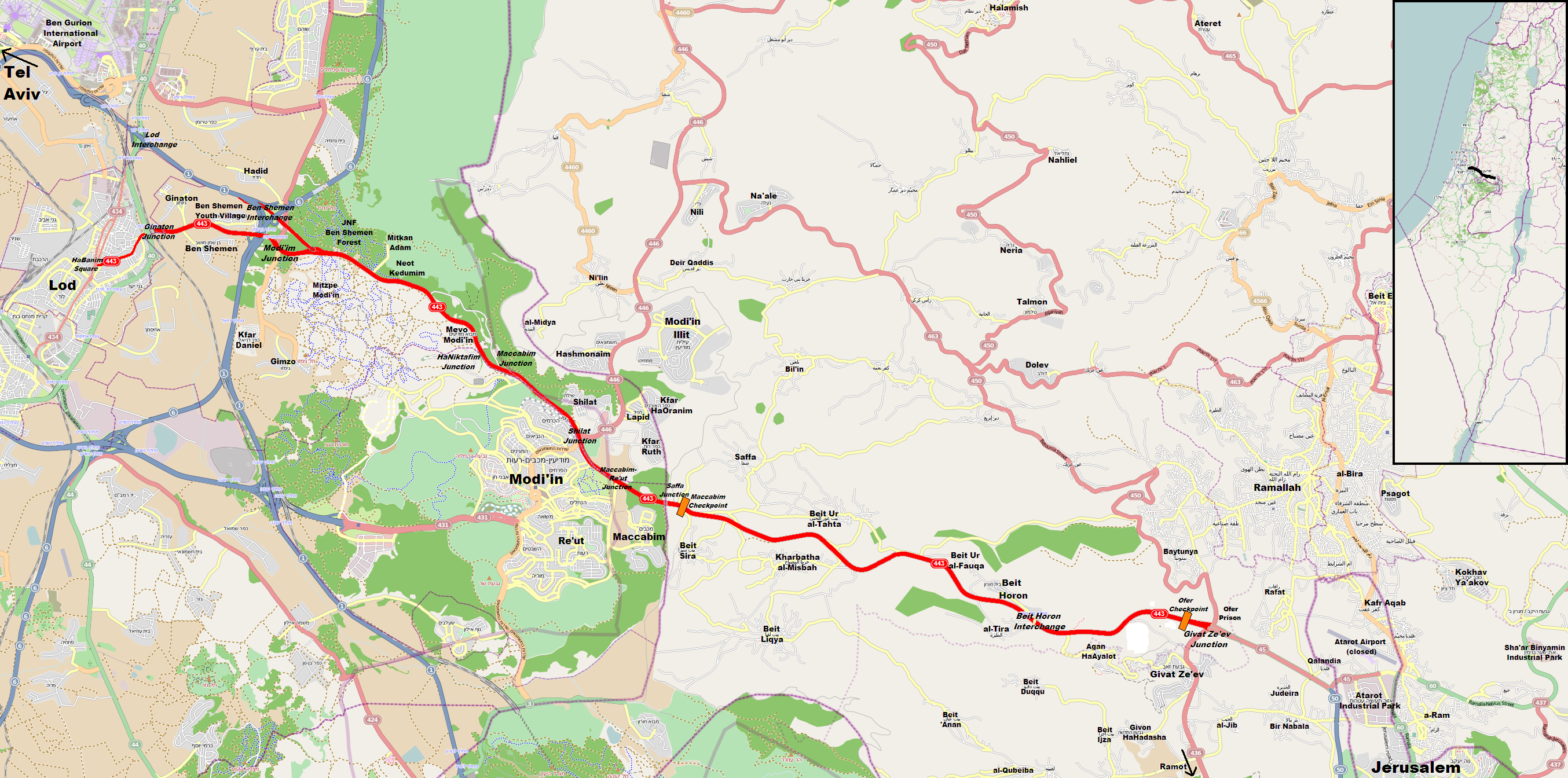

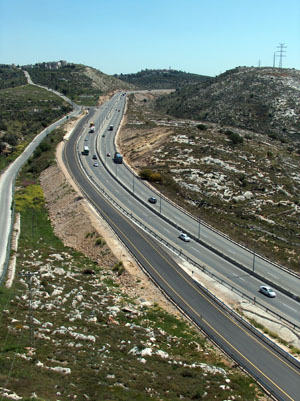
- Eastward ascent of Route 443 between Modi'in and Jerusalem approaching Beit Ur al-Fauqa

Route information
- Length: 28.3 km (17.6 mi)

Major junctions
- West end: Ginaton Junction
- Ben Shemen Interchange; Shilat Junction; Beit Horon Interchange
- East end: Giv'at Ze'ev Junction

Location
- Country: Israel
- Major cities: Modi'in-Maccabim-Re'ut, Giv'at Ze'ev

Highway system
- Roads in Israel; Highways
← Route 441	→ Route 444

Route 443 (Hebrew: כביש 443, מעלה בית חורון) is also known as Ma'ale Beit Horon (Bethoron Ascent), following the ancient east-west trade route connecting the Via Maris and the Way of the Patriarchs. It is the main highway connecting Tel Aviv and Gush Dan with Jerusalem via Modi'in. While technically listed as a regional road, it is, for the most part, a divided, four-lane highway which utilizes some grade separation and interchanges, as well as major at-grade intersections, and thus is not classified as a motorway, even though there is a short motorway section on its western end, connecting it to westbound Highway 1.

== Route ==
Route 443 begins as a local street near downtown Lod. Leaving Lod to the east, it becomes a divided highway, crossing Highway 1 and Highway 6 at the Ben Shemen Interchange, and continuing to Shilat junction, which serves as the entrance for the Modi'in area. It then continues through the West Bank in the Matte Binyamin Regional Council, near Ramallah. Upon passing Givat Ze'ev Junction, its official designation becomes Highway 45 which continues directly to Jerusalem's Highway 50 (Begin Boulevard). A spur, Route 436, also links it with Jerusalem through Giv'at Ze'ev and the Ramot neighbourhood.

== The road in antiquity ==
The road was used during many battles in antiquity due to its unique geography. It is mentioned in several ancient writings.

- In Joshua (Joshua 10:10), it is the location of a battle during the conquest of the Land of Canaan.
- In 1 Samuel (1 Samuel 13:18), the road is used during a battle between the Israelites and the Philistines.
- It is also mentioned in 1 Maccabees (1 Maccabees 3:13–26) describing the Battle of Beth Horon between the Macabees and the Seleucid Empire.
- Later, it is the location of a battle with the Romans as described by Josephus in Wars of the Jews (Bk II, Ch 19, paragraphs 2 & 8).

As opposed to the modern Highway 1, which twists and turns, rises and falls between mountains and valleys on its way to Jerusalem through the Judean hills, the central portion of Highway 443 runs along a ridge line and maintains a relatively stable grade.

== Use by Palestinian traffic ==
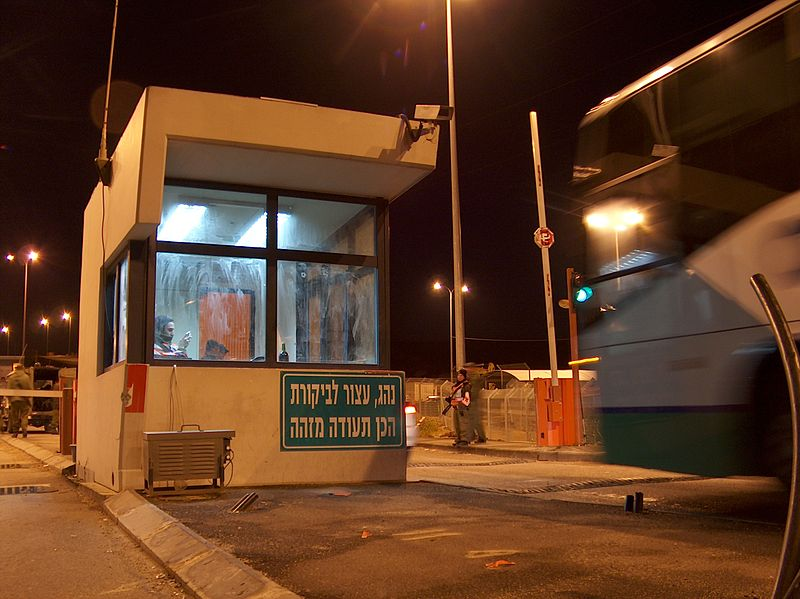
Westbound Maccabim Security Checkpoint approaching Modi'in

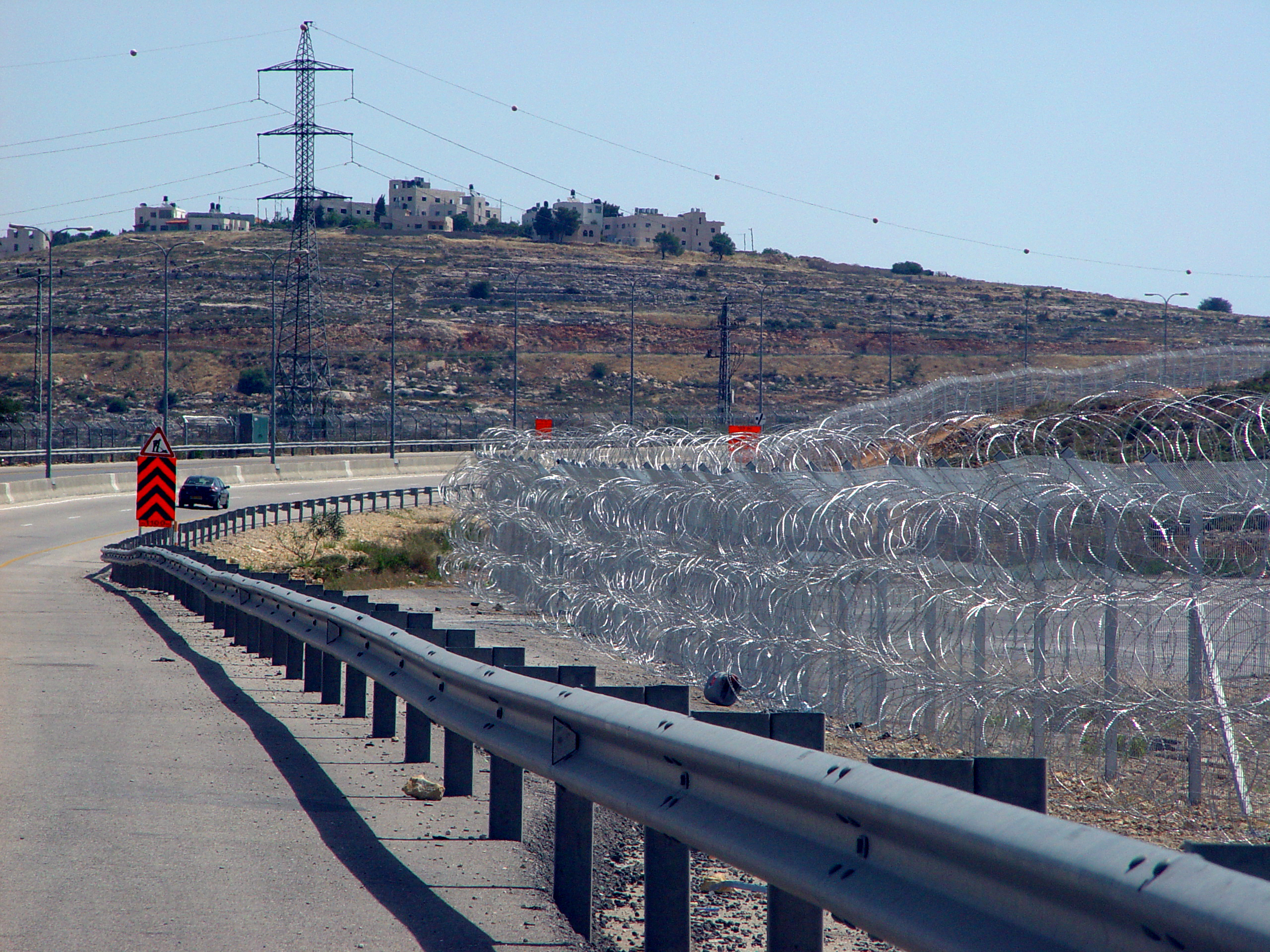
Route 443 near Giv'at Ze'ev Junction, with pyramid-shaped stacks of barbed wire forming a section of the Israeli West Bank barrier

The route crosses into the West Bank just north of Maccabim and continues until the junction just north of Givat Ze'ev; Palestinian traffic is permitted to use the road between these two points.

Several access roads connecting Palestinian villages with this section of Route 443 were closed in September 2000 due to the outbreak of the Second Intifada. Frequent fire bomb attacks and fatal shootings on Israeli traffic saw the erection of anti-sniper barricades on parts of the highway adjacent to Palestinian-populated areas.

In March 2008, following a challenge by the Association for Civil Rights in Israel, Israel's Supreme Court permitted for six more months the right of the IDF to limit Palestinian traffic in this section, deeming the restrictions necessary to prevent attacks. On December 29, 2009 Israel's High Court of Justice upheld the ACRI's petition against an IDF order barring Palestinian traffic. The ruling became effective May 28, 2010, and unrestricted Palestinian traffic was again permitted.

== Junctions and Interchanges (West to East) ==
District	Location	km	mi	Name	Destinations	Notes
Central	Lod	0	0.0	צומת גינתון (Ginaton Junction)	Highway 40	
Central	Ben Shemen	0.8	0.50	צומת בן שמן (Ben Shemen Junction)	Derech HaZayit	
Central	Ginaton	1	0.62	צומת בן שמן (Ben Shemen Junction)	Derech HaRimon	
Central	Ben Shemen Youth Village	1.6	0.99	כפר הנוער בן שמן (Ben Shemen Youth Village)	Access Road	
Central	Ben Shemen	3	1.9	מחלף בן שמן (Ben Shemen Interchange)	Highway 1; Highway 6; Route 444	
Central	Ben Shemen Forest	3.3	2.1	צומת מודיעים (Modi'im Junction)	Route 444	
Central	Ben Shemen Forest	3.4	2.1	צומת גמזו (Gimzo Junction)	Road 4314	
Central	Neot Kedumim	5	3.1	צומת נאות קדומים (Neot Kedumim Junction)	Access road (Westbound only)	
Central	Neot Kedumim	6	3.7	צומת קדומים דרום (South Kedumim Junction)	Access road to Neot Kedumim (Eastbound only)	
Central	Mevo Modi'im	6	3.7	צומת קדומים דרום (South Kedumim Junction)	Entrance road to Mevo Modi'im (Westbound only)	
Central	Mevo Modi'im	8.7	5.4	צומת מבוא מודיעים (Mevo Modi'im Junction)	Entrance road (Eastbound only)	
Central	Modi'in	10.2	6.3	צומת מכבים (Maccabim Junction)	Road 4466 (Westbound only)	
Central	Modi'in	11	6.8	צומת מודיעין מערב (West Modi'in Junction)	Yehuda Hamaccabi St.	
Central	Shilat	12.8	8.0	צומת שילת (Shilat Junction)	Route 446	
Central	Modi'in	13	8.1	צומת מודיעין מזרח (East Modi'in Junction)	HaHashmonayim Avenue	
Central	Modi'in	14.3	8.9	צומת מכבים-רעות (Maccabim-Re'ut Junction)	Derech Yair Parag	
Green Line
Judea and Samaria	Saffa	16	9.9	צומת ספא (Saffa Junction)	Open to Palestinians only	
Maccabim Security Checkpoint; NO westbound through-traffic for green (Palestinian Authority) license plates
Judea and Samaria	Beit Sira	16.1	10.0	צומת בית חורון (Saffa Junction)	Open to Palestinians only	
Judea and Samaria	Beit Ur al-Tahta; Kharbatha al-Misbah; Beit Liqya	19.8	12.3	מחלף עור א-תחתא (Ur Al-Tahta Interchange)	Road 4430	
Judea and Samaria	Beit Ur al-Fauqa	22.3	13.9	צומת מעלה בית חורון (Ma'ale Beit Horon Junction)	Road 4437	
Judea and Samaria	Beit Horon; At-Tira	23.4	14.5	מחלף בית חורון (Beit Horon Interchange)	Road 4432	
Ofer Security Checkpoint; NO eastbound through-traffic for green (Palestinian Authority) license plates
Judea and Samaria	Givat Ze'ev	28.3	17.6	צומת גבעת זאב (Givat Ze'ev Junction)	Highway 45; Route 436	
1.000 mi = 1.609 km; 1.000 km = 0.621 mi
