= Beit Ur al-Tahta =

- Municipality type C

Arabic transcription(s)
  - Arabic: بيت عور التحت
  - Latin: Bayt Ur at-Tahta (unofficial)
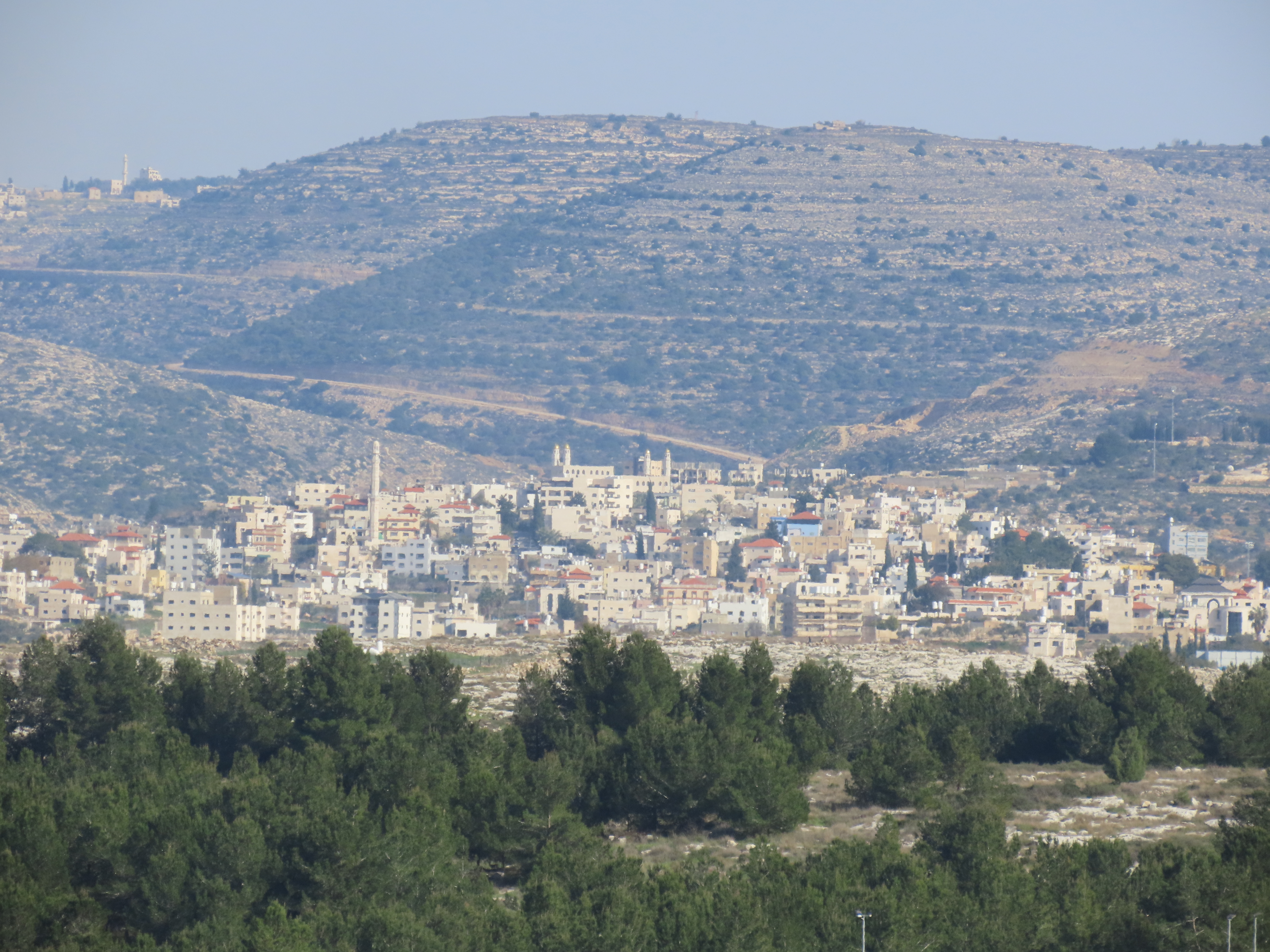

- Location of Beit Ur al-Tahta within the West Bank Location of Beit Ur al-Tahta within Palestine
- Coordinates: 31°53′42″N 35°05′01″E
- Palestine grid: 158/144
- State: State of Palestine
- Governorate: Ramallah and al-Bireh

Government
  - Type: Municipality
- Elevation: 407 m (1,335 ft)

Population (2017)
  - Total: 5,040
- Name meaning: "Lower house of Ur"

Beit Ur al-Tahta (Arabic: بيت عور التحتى, lit. "Lower house of straw") is a Palestinian village located in the central West Bank, in the Ramallah and Al-Bireh Governorate of the State of Palestine. According to the Palestinian Central Bureau of Statistics, Beit Ur at-Tahta had a population of 5,040 inhabitants in 2017.

== Location and geography ==
Beit 'Ur at Tahta is located 11.4 kilometers (7.1 mi) west of Ramallah. It is bordered by Beit Ur al Fauqa to the east, Deir Ibzi to the east and north, Saffa and Beit Sira to the west, and Kharbatha al Misbah to the south.

The old center of Beit Ur al-Tahta is located in the southern part of the village, while the northern part is marked by wide terraces and is the site of several of the village's archaeological pieces. The total area of the village is 5,653 dunams, of which 773 dunams were built-up areas.

== History ==
=== Ancient and classical periods ===
Beit Ur al-Tahta is situated on an ancient tell, which has been identified as the site of Lower Bethoron. The modern Arabic name preserves part of the biblical name for the village, believed to be the namesake of the Canaanite deity Horon.

Archaeological findings indicate that Lower Bethoron was established before Upper Bethoron (Beit Ur al-Foqa); potsherds found in Beit Ur al-Fauqa date from the Iron Age onward, while potsherds from the lower town date from the Late Bronze Age.

In 66 CE, during the initial stages of the Great Jewish Revolt, Cestius Gallus was ambushed and defeated by rebels at this location.

The village has unearthed a variety of archaeological findings from antiquity. A Mandatory-period document mentions four ossuaries that were found in a tomb, two embellished with rosettes. Other noteworthy archaeological finds include an Iron Age olive press and a burial cave from the Roman period.

In January 2001, a burial cave was discovered on the southern outskirts of the village. The cave consisted of two chambers and an arched doorway. Artifacts inside the cave included several pottery fragments, a cooking pot, a bowl and goblet dating to the late Second Temple period (1st century BCE–1st century CE).

=== Byzantine period ===
To the west of the village is the ruins of a chapel, apparently from the Byzantine period, and ceramics from the same period have also been found. The village also yielded acanthus capitals, traces of a mosaic floor, and architectural fragments. Capitals, bases, and a marble chancel were discovered in er-Ras, situated east of the village.

A fragment of a marble sarcophagus, featuring Greek inscriptions (...of ...asia ...; ... son of Andr...) was found among the ruins of a Christian church, in the vicinity of a new mosque.

=== Crusader period ===
During the Crusader period, the place was mentioned in the 12th century as a fief of the Holy Sepulchre. While some scholars associate Beit Ur al-Tahta with Vetus Betor of the Crusader era, others argue for its location in Beit Ur al-Fauqa.

=== Ottoman period ===
In 1596 the village appeared in Ottoman tax registers under the name of Bayt 'Ur as-Sufla and was part of the Nahiya ("Subdistrict") of Quds of the Liwa ("District") of Quds. It had a population of 20 Muslim households who paid a fixed tax rate of 25% on various agricultural products, including wheat, barley, olives, goats and/or beehives; a total of 3,700 akçe.

In 1838 it was noted as a Muslim village, located in the Beni Malik area, west of Jerusalem.

A 19th-century traveler visiting the town found the remains of ancient foundations, rock-cut cisterns and a tomb that was said to have contained treasures. Father P.M. Séjourné, revisiting the site, noticed the ruins of a large church: "The mosaic pavement of an important church located northeast of the village has disappeared, at least for the moment, under a watermelon field. The scattered spoils of the Christian building have enriched the neighbouring modern mosque and many hovels nearby. Fragments of a graceful frieze, capitals with Corinthian acanthus carved in white marble, columns and dressed stones lie unused along the roads." Another researcher, Victor Guérin, saw two columns from the church inside the local mosque. Based on these finds, it was concluded that the village was once Christian, and had a large three-nave church.

An official Ottoman village list from about 1870 showed that Bet Ur et-Tatha had 35 houses and a population of 185, though it only counted the men.

In 1883, the PEF's Survey of Western Palestine described Beit 'Ur et Tahta as "A village of moderate size on a low ridge with wells to the west. In the middle of the village is the sacred place of Neby 'Or, with a palm tree in the courtyard: near it is a well in the street.

=== British Mandate period ===
In the 1922 census of Palestine, conducted by the British Mandate authorities, Beit Ur al-Tahta had a population of 470, all Muslims, while at the 1931 census, Beit 'Ur al-Tahta had 117 occupied houses and a population of 611, still all Muslim.

In the 1945 statistics the population was 710, all Muslims, while the total land area was 4,619 dunams, according to an official land and population survey. Of this, 2,045 were allocated for plantations and irrigable land, 1,780 for cereals, while 41 dunams were classified as built-up (urban) areas.

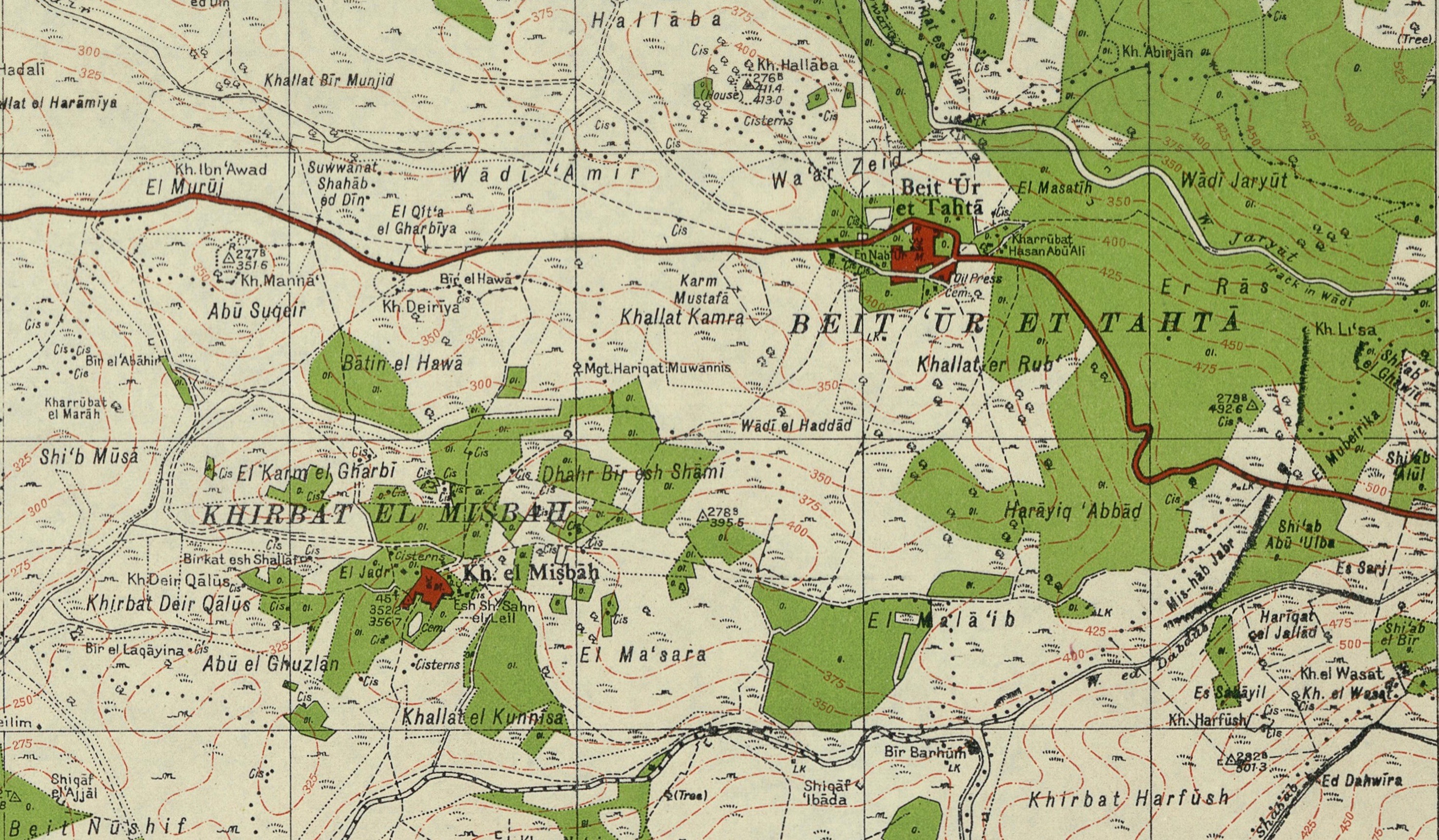
Beit Ur al-Tahta 1944 1:20,000 from 1919 survey

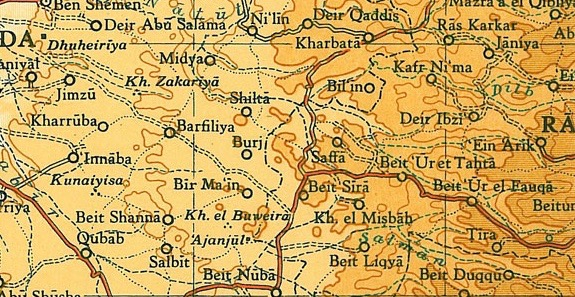
Beit Ur al-Tahta 1945 1:250,000 (bottom right quadrant)

=== Jordanian period ===
In the wake of the 1948 Arab–Israeli War, and after the 1949 Armistice Agreements, Beit Ur al-Tahta came under Jordanian rule.

In 1961, the population was 1,198 persons.

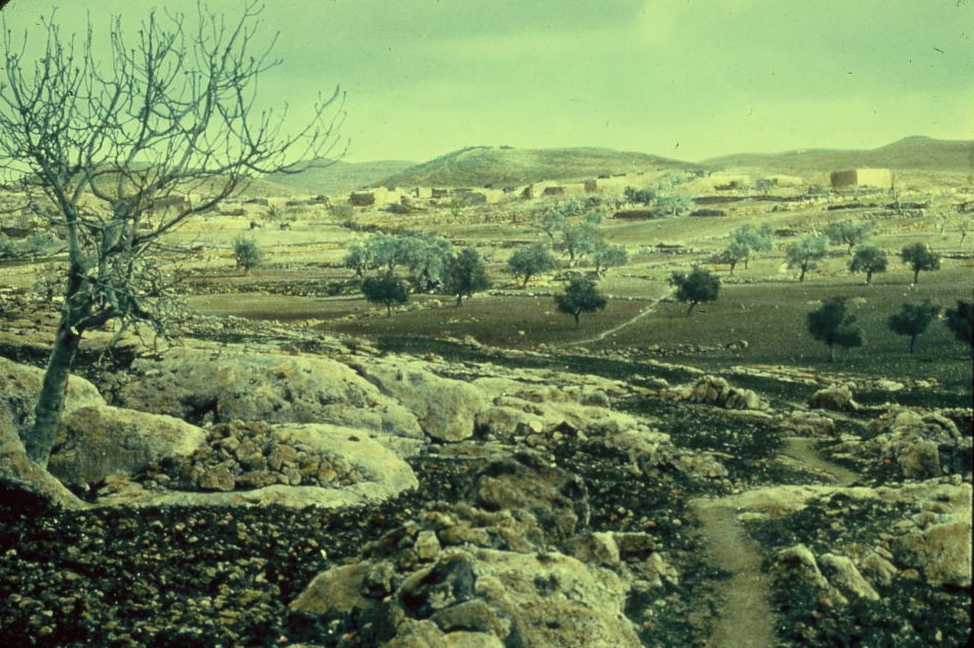
Beit Ur al-Tahta, between 1950 and 1977

=== Post-1967 ===
Since the Six-Day War in 1967, Beit Ur al-Tahta has been under Israeli occupation. The population in the 1967 census conducted by the Israeli authorities was of 920, of whom 60 originated from the Israeli territory.

In the 1980s, several members of the "Village League" (local citizens authorized by Israel to carry arms and enforce order) were killed by their fellow villagers in Beit Ur al-Tahta for cooperating with Israel.

In the 1980s and 1990s, lands belonging to Beit Ur al-Tahta were confiscated by the Israeli government to build Highway 443 along the Pass of Bethoron. A petition challenging the move submitted to the Supreme Court of Israel in September 1983 was rejected by Justice Aharon Barak who ruled that under international law, a military government have the right to infringe private property if a number of conditions are fulfilled, stating that "The step is taken for the benefit of the local population". Highway 443 initially served as a main approach road linking the 25,000 inhabitants of six villages to each other's and to Ramallah. After the outbreak of the Second Intifada, the Israeli military prevented Palestinian use of the road and blocked some parts of it without a legal order, and the construction of the Israeli West Bank barrier closed off access to the old road, which lengthened the journey. In 2007, the Israeli High Court of Justice ordered the state of Israel to explain why the road has been blocked for seven years without a legal order and why Palestinians are prevented from using it.

After the 1995 accords, 36.7% of village land was classified as Area B land, and the remaining 63.3% as Area C. Israel has confiscated land from the village in order to construct the Israeli settlement of Beit Horon.

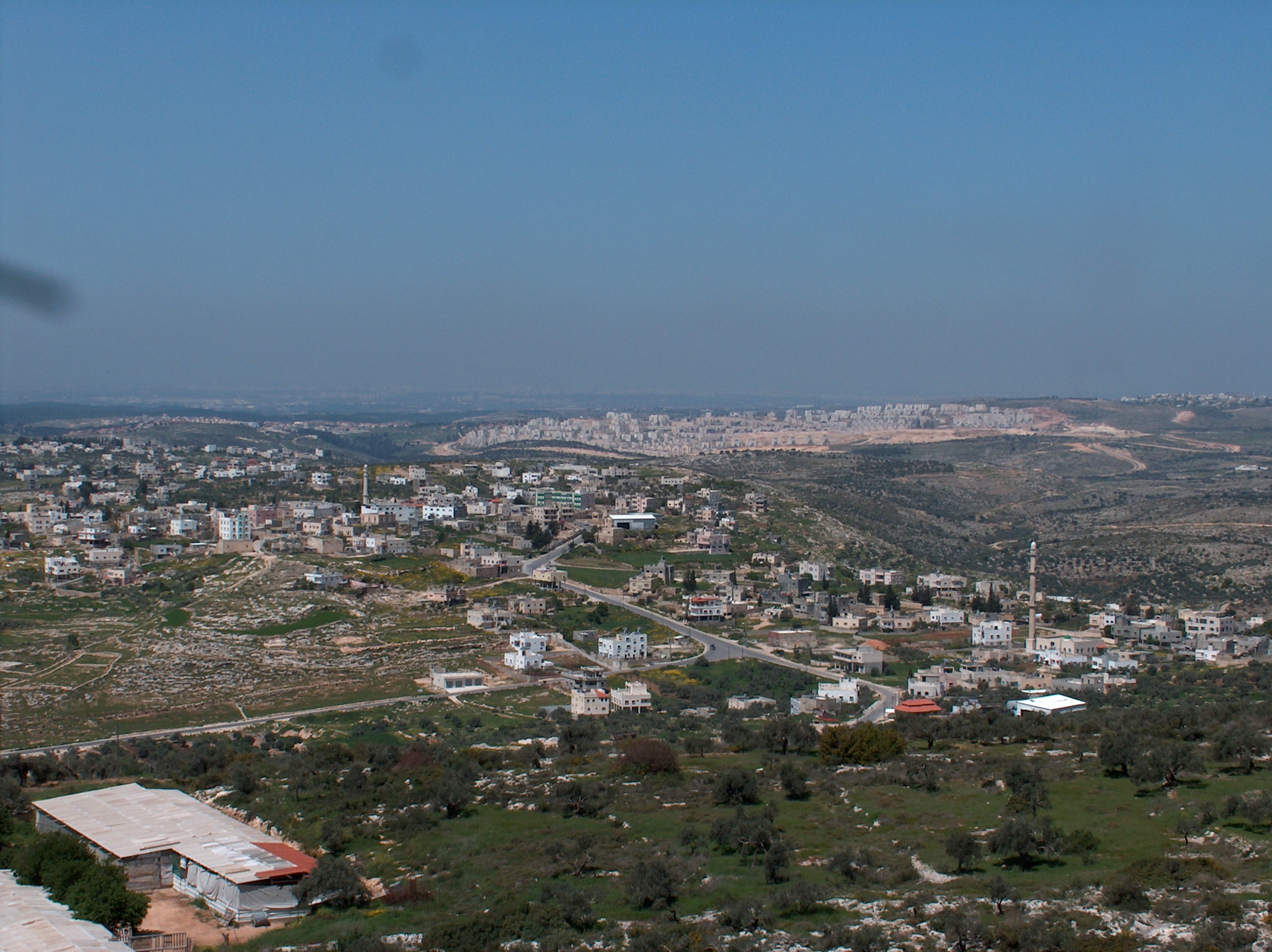
Aerial view of Beit Ur al-Tahta and its vicinity

In October 2009, infrastructure improvements were completed in Beit Ur al-Tahta that included improved roads and street lighting. The project was funded by American Charities for Palestine, the United States Agency for International Development (USAID) and the Sheikh Mohammed Shami Foundation. The total cost was $400,000.

In September 2021, a Palestinian gardener was shot dead near the village when he apparently lit up a cigarette near a group of Kfir Brigade soldiers sitting nearby in ambush for potential Molotov bomb throwers.

== Holy Sites ==
=== Shrine of Nebī 'Ur ===
Nebī 'Ur is a shrine and tomb located in Beit 'Ur al-Tahta. Since 1958, when a mosque was erected on the site, the tomb has been housed in its courtyard but is devoid of a headstone. The women of the village used to come to the site to pray for rain. When a baby was unwell, it was customary to bathe the mother and son for seven days while adding seven stones from the tomb to the water. The site is used for prayer and Sufi rituals that include musical instruments, for which a storage room was constructed.

Since Nebī 'Ur is unknown in Muslim tradition, it suggested that he be defined as a local saint who was given the village's name along with the epithet Nebī (meaning "prophet" in Arabic) in order to elevate the village's status by associating it with a figure of religious significance.

=== Khirbet Hallaba ===
Close to the village lies the large ruin of Khirbet Hallaba, situated atop a hill 411 meters high and its surrounding foothills. There were mostly Roman and Byzantine potsherds found, along with a smaller number of Hellenistic, early Islamic, and medieval sherds as well. The site was also surveyed by Finkelstein et al., who described it as "a large site with the remains of buildings on its summit". He noted the secondary use of ancient remains in later structures in the vicinity, such as a pillar integrated into a terrace wall and high terrace walls constructed from reused stones. Additionally, rock-cut installations have been discovered nearby.

In the 19th century, French explorer Victor Guérin noted that the villagers of Beit 'Ur al-Tahta worship a woman named "Hanieh bent-Yakoub" in a dome at Khirbet Hallabeh.

== See also ==
- Farouk Shami

== Bibliography ==
- Barron, J.B., ed. (1923). Palestine: Report and General Abstracts of the Census of 1922. Government of Palestine.
- Conder, C.R.; Kitchener, H.H. (1883). The Survey of Western Palestine: Memoirs of the Topography, Orography, Hydrography, and Archaeology. Vol. 3. London: Committee of the Palestine Exploration Fund.
- Dauphin, C. (1998). La Palestine byzantine, Peuplement et Populations. BAR International Series 726 (in French). Vol. III : Catalogue. Oxford: Archeopress. ISBN 0-860549-05-4.
- Finkelstein, I.; Lederman, Zvi, eds. (1997). Highlands of many cultures. Tel Aviv: Institute of Archaeology of Tel Aviv University Publications Section. ISBN 965-440-007-3.
- Government of Jordan, Department of Statistics (1964). First Census of Population and Housing. Volume I: Final Tables; General Characteristics of the Population (PDF).
- Government of Palestine, Department of Statistics (1945). Village Statistics, April, 1945.
- Guérin, V. (1868). Description Géographique Historique et Archéologique de la Palestine (in French). Vol. 1: Judee, pt. 1. Paris: L'Imprimerie Nationale.
- Guérin, V. (1875). Description Géographique Historique et Archéologique de la Palestine (in French). Vol. 2: Samarie, pt. 2. Paris: L'Imprimerie Nationale.
- Hadawi, S. (1970). Village Statistics of 1945: A Classification of Land and Area ownership in Palestine. Palestine Liberation Organization Research Center. Archived from the original on 2018-12-08.
- Hartmann, M. (1883). "Die Ortschaftenliste des Liwa Jerusalem in dem türkischen Staatskalender für Syrien auf das Jahr 1288 der Flucht (1871)". Zeitschrift des Deutschen Palästina-Vereins. 6: 102–149.
- Hütteroth, W.-D.; Abdulfattah, K. (1977). Historical Geography of Palestine, Transjordan and Southern Syria in the Late 16th Century. Erlanger Geographische Arbeiten, Sonderband 5. Erlangen, Germany: Vorstand der Fränkischen Geographischen Gesellschaft. ISBN 3-920405-41-2.
- Mills, E., ed. (1932). Census of Palestine 1931. Population of Villages, Towns and Administrative Areas. Jerusalem: Government of Palestine.
- Palmer, E.H. (1881). The Survey of Western Palestine: Arabic and English Name Lists Collected During the Survey by Lieutenants Conder and Kitchener, R. E. Transliterated and Explained by E.H. Palmer. Committee of the Palestine Exploration Fund.
- Peleg, Yuval (2004-06-09). "'Beit 'Ur et-Tahta" (116). Hadashot Arkheologiyot – Excavations and Surveys in Israel.
- Robinson, E.; Smith, E. (1841). Biblical Researches in Palestine, Mount Sinai and Arabia Petraea: A Journal of Travels in the year 1838. Vol. 3. Boston: Crocker & Brewster.
- Socin, A. (1879). "Alphabetisches Verzeichniss von Ortschaften des Paschalik Jerusalem". Zeitschrift des Deutschen Palästina-Vereins. 2: 135–163.
