= Kharbatha Bani Harith =

- Municipality type D (Village council)

Arabic transcription(s)
  - Arabic: خربثا بني حارث
  - Latin: Kharbatha al-Harithiyya (official)
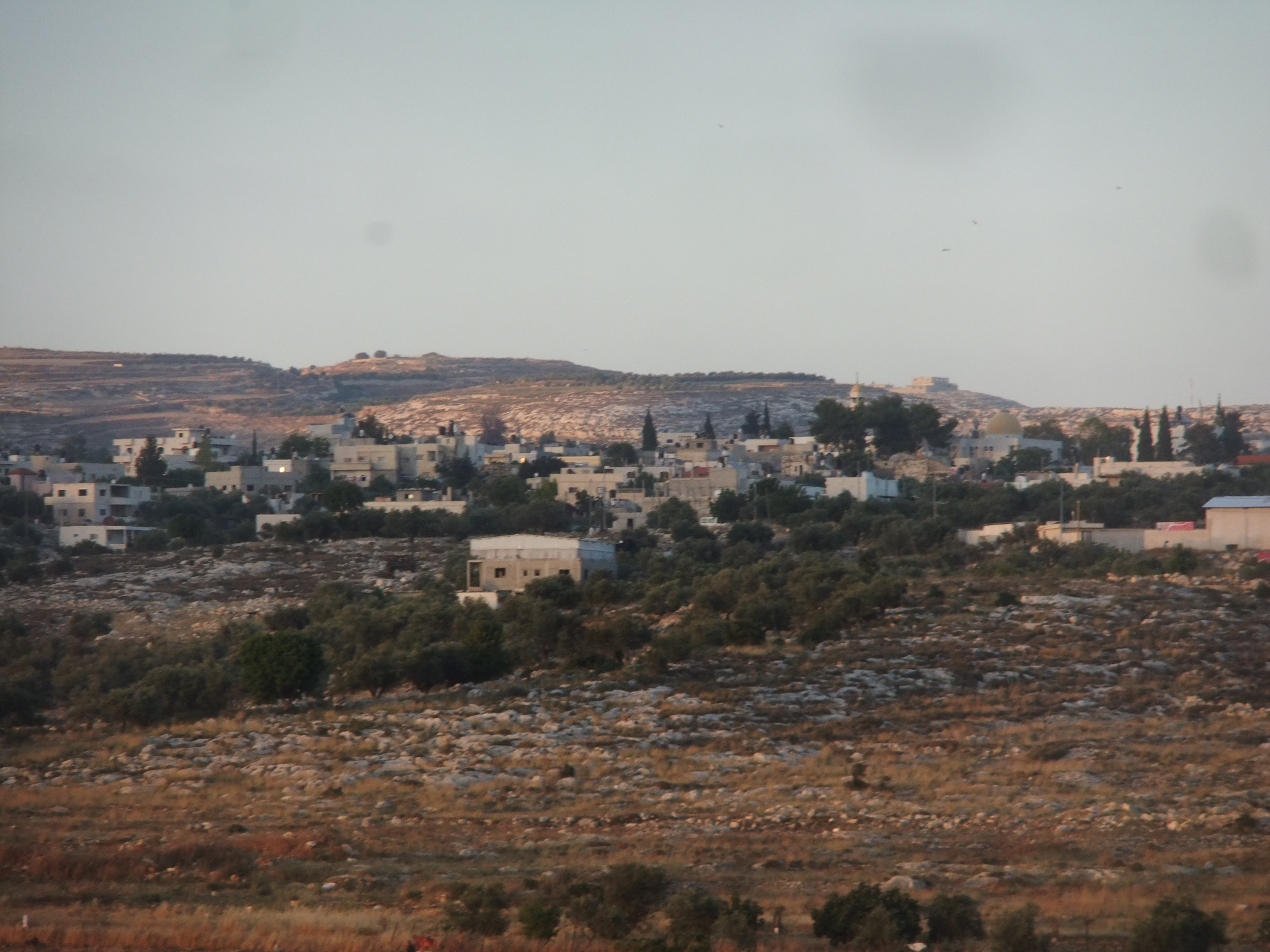
- Kharbatha Bani Harith from the west

- Location of Kharbatha Bani Harith within Palestine
- Coordinates: 31°56′43″N 35°04′21″E
- Palestine grid: 156/150
- State: State of Palestine
- Governorate: Ramallah and al-Bireh

Government
  - Type: Village council

Area
  - Total: 7.12 km^{2} (2.75 sq mi)
- Elevation: 396 m (1,299 ft)

Population (2017)
  - Total: 3,471
  - Density: 488/km^{2} (1,260/sq mi)
- Name meaning: "The ruins of the sons of Harith"

Kharbatha Bani Harith (Arabic: خربثا بني حارث) is a Palestinian village in the central West Bank, located 15 kilometers west of Ramallah in the Ramallah and al-Bireh Governorate. According to the Palestinian Central Bureau of Statistics, the village had a population of 3,471 in 2017. It has a total land area of 7,120 dunams.

== Location ==
Kharbatha Bani Harith is located 13.1 kilometers (8.1 mi) west of Ramallah. It is bordered by Ras Karkar to the east, Al-Itihad to the north, Deir Qaddis to the north and west, and Bil’in and Kafr Ni’ma to the south.

== Etymology ==
The name of the village literally translates from Arabic as 'the ruins of the sons of Harith' and receives its appellation from the Ottoman-era district of Bani Harith where the village was located. The Bani Harith was a tribe which left its imprint in other neighboring sites. The Arabic Kharbatha is derived from the Aramaic Ḫarbatā or Ḫarbata, a toponym also meaning 'the ruin'.

== History ==
Pottery sherds from Iron Age II, Persian, Byzantine, Byzantine/Umayyad and Mamluk era have been found here.

=== Ottoman era ===
Kharbatha Bani Harith became part of the Ottoman Empire in 1517 with all of Palestine. In 1552, 'Kharbatha' was an inhabited village, and its tax revenues were endowed to the Haseki Sultan Imaret in Jerusalem. Administratively, the village belonged to the nahiya (subdistrict) of Ramla in the Gaza Sanjak. In 1596 it appeared under the name of 'Harabta' in the Ottoman tax registers. It had a population of 29 Muslim and 4 Christian households. They paid a fixed tax-rate of 25% on agricultural products, including wheat, barley, summer crops, vineyards, fruit trees, goats and beehives, in addition to occasional revenues; a total of 2,200 Akçe. All of the revenues went to a Waqf.

In 1870, the French traveler Victor Guérin found the village to have about 200 inhabitants. He also noted the remains of a church, which has been dated to the Byzantine era (4th–7th centuries CE). In 1882, the Palestine Exploration Fund's Survey of Western Palestine described Kharbatha Bani Harith as being of medium size, with a well on the west, "standing on high ground among the olive trees".

By the beginning of the 20th century, residents from Kharbatha settled Shilta near al-Ramla, establishing it as a dependency – or satellite village – of their home village.

=== British Mandate era ===
In the 1922 census of Palestine, conducted by the British Mandate authorities, Kharbatha Bani Harith had a population of 338, all Muslims. In the 1931 census the population increased to 469, still all Muslim, living in 102 houses.

In the 1945 statistics the population of Kharbatha Bani Harith was 650, all Muslims, who owned 7,120 dunams of land according to an official land and population survey. Of these, 2,788 dunams were used as plantations and irrigable land and 591 for grain fields, while the built-up area consisted of 9 dunams.

=== Jordanian era ===
In the wake of the 1948 Arab–Israeli War, and after the 1949 Armistice Agreements, Kharbatha Bani Harith came under Jordanian rule. The Jordanian census of 1961 found 835 inhabitants and the village was listed as 'Kh. Harithiya'.

=== 1967–present ===
After the Six-Day War in 1967, Kharbatha Bani Harith came under Israeli occupation. After the 1995 accords, 942 dunums of village land were classified Area B, the remaining 6,200 dunums as Area C. According to ARIJ, 833 dunams of village land has been confiscated by Israel for the Israeli settlement of Modi'in Illit.

== See also ==
- Kharbatha al-Misbah

== Bibliography ==
- Barron, J.B., ed. (1923). Palestine: Report and General Abstracts of the Census of 1922. Government of Palestine.
- Conder, C.R.; Kitchener, H.H. (1882). The Survey of Western Palestine: Memoirs of the Topography, Orography, Hydrography, and Archaeology. Vol. 2. London: Committee of the Palestine Exploration Fund.
- Finkelstein, I.; Lederman, Zvi, eds. (1997). Highlands of many cultures. Tel Aviv: Institute of Archaeology of Tel Aviv University Publications Section. ISBN 965-440-007-3.
- Government of Jordan, Department of Statistics (1964). First Census of Population and Housing. Volume I: Final Tables; General Characteristics of the Population (PDF).
- Government of Palestine, Department of Statistics (1945). Village Statistics, April, 1945.
- Guérin, V. (1875). Description Géographique Historique et Archéologique de la Palestine (in French). Vol. 2: Samarie, pt. 2. Paris: L'Imprimerie Nationale.
- Hadawi, S. (1970). Village Statistics of 1945: A Classification of Land and Area ownership in Palestine. Palestine Liberation Organization Research Center. Archived from the original on 2018-12-08.
- Hütteroth, W.-D.; Abdulfattah, K. (1977). Historical Geography of Palestine, Transjordan and Southern Syria in the Late 16th Century. Erlanger Geographische Arbeiten, Sonderband 5. Erlangen, Germany: Vorstand der Fränkischen Geographischen Gesellschaft. ISBN 3-920405-41-2.
- Mills, E., ed. (1932). Census of Palestine 1931. Population of Villages, Towns and Administrative Areas. Jerusalem: Government of Palestine.
- Palmer, E.H. (1881). The Survey of Western Palestine: Arabic and English Name Lists Collected During the Survey by Lieutenants Conder and Kitchener, R. E. Transliterated and Explained by E.H. Palmer. Committee of the Palestine Exploration Fund.
- Petersen, Andrew (2005). The Towns of Palestine Under Muslim Rule. British Archaeological Reports. ISBN 1841718211.
