= Ben Shemen Forest =

Forest in central Israel

Coordinates: 31°57′3.57″N 34°57′19.34″E

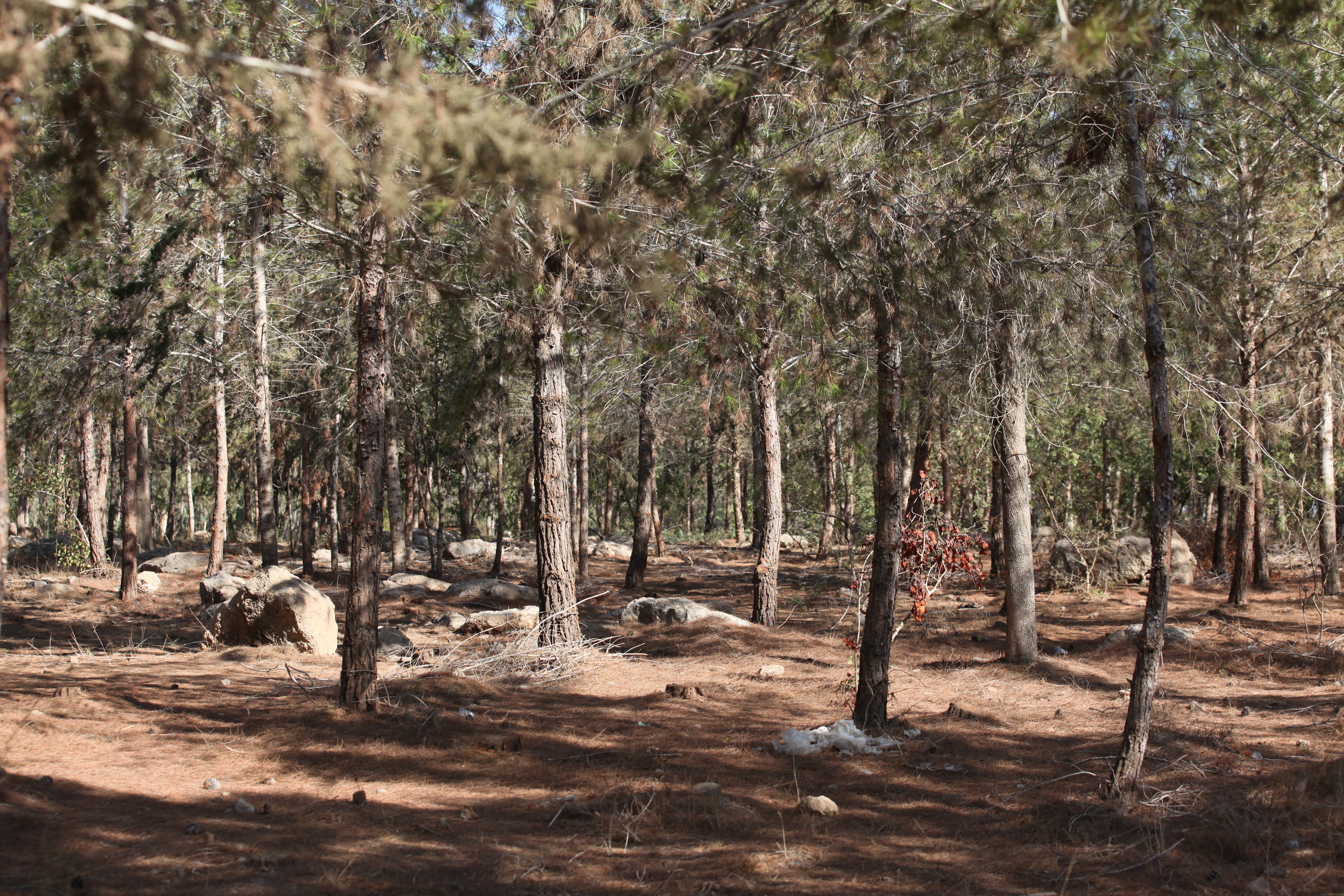
Ben Shemen Forest

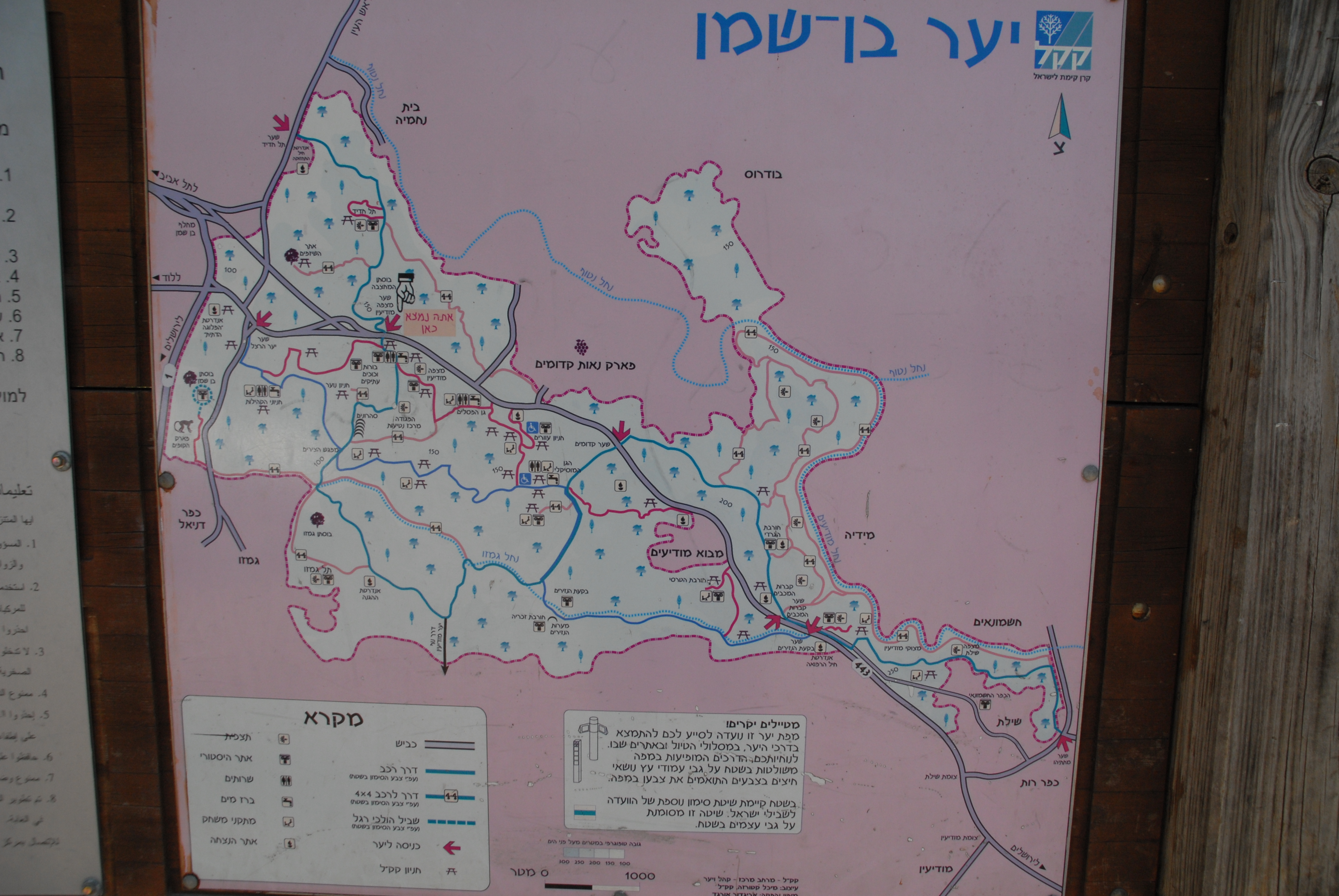
Tourist map

Ben Shemen Forest (Hebrew: יער בן שמן) is the largest forest in central Israel and one of the largest in the entire country (the eastern and southern sections of the forest are also known as the Modiin Forest), covering an area of 22,000 dunams (22 km²). In the forest there are picnic spots, hiking and bicycle routes. It is located on both sides of Route 443, between the Ben Shemen Interchange and the city of Modi'in-Maccabim-Re'ut. The first trees were planted by the Jewish National Fund in 1908.
