= Bethoron =

Biblical town

Coordinates: 31°52′38″N 35°7′7″E

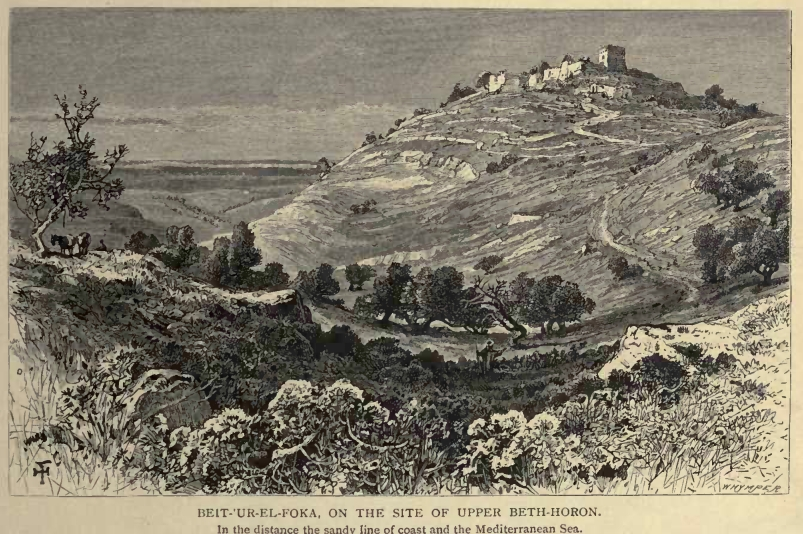
Upper Bethoron, drawing from 1880

Bethoron (Hebrew: בֵית־חוֹרֹ֔ן, lit. 'house of Horon'; Ancient Greek: Ὡρωνείν), also Beth-Horon, were two neighboring towns in ancient Israel, situated on the Gibeon–Aijalon road. They served as strategic points along the road, guarding the "ascent of Bethoron". While the Hebrew Bible sometimes distinguishes between the two towns—Upper and Lower Bethoron—it often refers to both simply as Bethoron. The towns are mentioned in the Bible and in other ancient sources: Upper Bethoron appears in Joshua 16:5, Lower Bethoron in Joshua 16:3, both in 1 Chronicles 7:24, and the ascent in I Maccabees 3:16.

During the Second Temple period, the Bethoron pass was the site of several major military engagements, including Maccabean victories over Seleucid forces in the 160s BCE and the Jewish victory over the Romans at the Battle of Beth Horon in 66 CE. The pass's steep and confined terrain made it particularly suited to ambushes.

The ancient towns of Upper Bethoron and Lower Bethoron are identified respectively with the present-day Palestinian Arab villages of Beit Ur al-Fauqa and Beit Ur al-Tahta, which preserve the ancient names. Archaeological evidence suggests that Lower Bethoron was established first, as the earliest potsherds discovered there date back to the Late Bronze Age, while those from the upper town originate from the Iron Age onward.

== Etymology ==
R7 G29 Z1 U33 V28 V4 G1 E23 N35 N25
bꜣtꜣ(j) ḥwꜣrwn
in hieroglyphs
Era: 3rd Intermediate Period
(1069–664 BC)

The Hebrew name Bethoron (Beit Horon, בית חורון) is derived from the name of an Egypto-Canaanite deity, Horon, mentioned in Ugaritic literature. The city is mentioned among the cities and towns smitten by Sheshonq I in his inscription at the Temple of Karnak as Batae Houarn.

== Ascent of Beth-horon ==
The biblical "way of Beth-horon", also known as "the ascent of Beth-horon", is a pass which ascends from the plain of Aijalon (now Ayalon-Canada Park) and climbs to Beit Ur al-Tahta (1,210 ft.). It then ascends along the ridge, with valleys lying to north and south, and reaches Beit Ur al-Fauqa (2,022 ft.). Al-tahta means 'the lower', and al-fauqa (fawqa) means 'the upper' in Arabic.

The ascent is an ancient east-west trade route connecting two broadly north-south routes, the Via Maris along the Mediterranean coastline, and the Way of the Patriarchs, which follows the crest of the central mountain range of Samaria in the north and Judah in the south.

== History ==
=== Iron Age: in the Bible and contemporary texts ===
Upper Bethoron is first mentioned in the Book of Joshua as a city on the border between the Israelite tribes of Benjamin and Ephraim (Joshua 16:5). The borderline passed alongside the two Bethorons (Joshua 16:5; 21:22) who belonged to the latter Israelite tribe and therefore, later on, to the Northern Kingdom of Israel, while the tribe of Benjamin belonged to the Kingdom of Judah. One or both of the towns was a Levitical city (Joshua 21:22; 2 Chronicles 6:53).

According to biblical records, these cities were conquered by the Israelites under the leadership of Joshua, who defeated the five Amorite kings near Gibeon and pursued them southward past Beth-Horon to Azekah and Makkedah (Joshua 10:5-11). According to the Bible, when Joshua defeated the Amorite kings, "he killed a large number of them at Gibeon, and chased them by the way of the 'Ascent of Beth-horon'".

Later on, the Philistines chose to launch their attack against Saul via the route passing through Beth-Horon (1 Samuel 13:18), sending a company of their men to hold "the way of Beth-horon".

Upper Bethoron is later mentioned in 2 Kings as one of the cities built and fortified by Solomon (1 Kings 9:17, also in 2 Chronicles 8:59). Solomon "built Beth-horon the upper, and Beth-horon the nether, fortified cities, with walls, gates, and bars" (2 Chronicles 8:5; 1 Kings 9:17).

From Egyptian sources it appears that Bethoron was one of the places conquered by Shishak of Egypt from Rehoboam. It may also be the Bethoron mentioned in a 8th/7th century ostracon found at Tel Qasile, which reports the transfer of 30 sheqels of Ophir gold to Bethoron.

According to 1 Chronicles 7:24, Lower Bethoron was built by She'era, daughter of Beriah, son of Ephraim. The Second Book of Chronicles mentions Beth-Horon in the context of disbanded Israelite mercenaries in Amaziah's army who looted towns in Judah "from Samaria to Beth-Horon" (2 Chronicles 25:13).

=== Hellenistic period ===
The Syrian (Seleucid) general Seron was defeated here in 166 BCE by Judas Maccabeus (1 Macc. 3:13–24) in the Battle of Beth Horon. Six years later Nicanor, retreating from Jerusalem, was defeated and slain (1 Macc. 7:39; Josephus, Antiquities Bk12 Ch10:5.)

Bacchides repaired Beth-horon "with high walls, with gates and with bars and in them he set a garrison, that they might work malice upon ("vex") Israel" (1 Macc. 9:50–51). Later, the Jews fortified it against Holofernes (Judith 4:4–5).

=== Roman period ===
There are traces of an ancient Roman paving still visible.

Josephus reports that during the governorship of Roman procurator Cumanus (c. 48–52 CE), an imperial servant named Stephan was robbed by bandits on the road near Bethoron. In response, Cumanus, holding the inhabitants responsible for failing to capture the robbers, sent soldiers into the surrounding villages. Josephus's fuller account in the Antiquities adds that the soldiers plundered the villages and brought their leading men to Cumanus in chains in Jerusalem. A Roman soldier found a copy of the "Law of Moses", brought it out before the local people and tore it apart. A large Jewish crowd gathered at Caesarea demanding that Cumanus punish the offender. Fearing a revolt, Cumanus had the soldier executed, and the disturbance subsided.

In the battle of Beth Horon in the year 66 CE, the first decisive Jewish victory in the First Jewish–Roman War the Roman general Cestius Gallus was driven in headlong flight before the Jews.

=== Late Roman & Byzantine periods ===
Eusebius' Onomasticon mentions the 'twin villages' and St. Jerome describes them as 'little hamlets.'

Jerome (late 4th to early 5th centuries) noted that Bethoron was just a little village at his time. In his eulogy for Saint Paula, he describes Lower and Upper Bethoron as cities founded by Solomon and destroyed by war.

=== Arab villages ===
The two Palestinian Arab Muslim villages of Beit Ur el-Fauqa and Beit Ur et-Tahta preserve the Hebrew–Canaanite name, and have been identified as the sites of Upper and Lower Bethoron.

=== Modern period ===
In 1915, the Palestine Exploration Fund wrote that changes in the main road to Jerusalem had left the Bethoron route "forsaken" and "almost forgotten".

The Israeli settlement of Beit Horon was founded in 1977 on a site adjacent to the two Arab towns.

Highway 443 follows part of the ancient road.

== Archaeology ==
Archaeological finds indicate that the lower town was established before the upper one. Potsherds from the Late Bronze Age onward were discovered at Lower Beit Ur, whereas those in Upper Beit Ur date only from the Iron Age onward.

== Bibliography ==
- Masterman, E. W. G. (1915).BETH-HORON. International Standard Bible Encyclopedia, Orr, James, retrieved December 9, 2005.
- Sharon, Moshe (1999). Corpus Inscriptionum Arabicarum Palaestinae, B-C. Vol. 2. BRILL. ISBN 9004110836.
