= Sheerah =

Sheerah is a woman in the Hebrew Bible who appears only in 1 Chronicles 7:24, where it says that she built three cities: Lower and Upper Beth-horon, and Uzzen-sheerah. According to 2 Chronicles 8:5, Upper and Lower Beth-horon were rebuilt by Solomon as fortified cities.

Sheerah was the daughter of Ephraim, and her brothers were Shuthelah, Bered, Tahath, Eleadah, Zabad, Beriah, Rephah, Resheph, Telah, Tahan, Ladan, Ammihud, Elishama, Nun, and Joshua.

Herbert Lockyer suggests that she "must have been a woman of physical power," while Antje Labahn and Ehud Ben Zvi note that "her prestige remained in the community" since one of the cities (Uzzen-sheerah) carried her name.

David Frankel notes that Sheerah and her family were born and raised in Canaan during the same time period where all Israelites were allegedly enslaved in Egypt. He concludes that the author of the Book of Chronicles unintentionally preserved an ancient tradition of Israelite indigeneity to Canaan.
