= Farouk Shami =

Palestinian-American businessman

- Born: Beit Ur al-Tahta, Ramallah, West Bank
- Education: University of Arkansas
- Occupation: Entrepreneur
- Known for: CHI hair care products Texas gubernatorial candidate
- Political party: Democratic

Farouk Shami is a Palestinian-American businessman and founder of the hair-care and spa products company, Farouk Systems located in Texas. In 2009, Shami ran in the 2010 Texas gubernatorial election.

== Early life ==
He was born in Beit Ur al-Tahta, a village near Ramallah in the West Bank.

== Entrepreneur ==
Shami has worked for decades in the field of hair-care product development, and attended cosmetology school in Arkansas. He invented the first ammonia-free hair color, after developing an allergy to the chemical that initially led doctors to encourage him to leave his profession.

His company, the Houston-based Farouk Systems, currently employs 600+ people in the US, and exports its line of hair and skin care products under the BioSilk, SunGlitz and Cationic Hydration Interlink (CHI) brands to over 106 countries worldwide.

On May 1, 2011, Shami made an appearance on The Celebrity Apprentice, when the show's contestants were given a project in which they promoted Farouk Systems products. He appeared again in the 4th episode of All Star Celebrity Apprentice.

== Controversy as Gubernatorial candidate ==
On Nov 19, 2009 Shami announced he was running for governor of Texas as a Democrat. During his campaign, he stated that he is not a member of any one specific organized religion, but said that he has a deep sense of personal relationship with God and that he felt a 'religious tug' in deciding to run for the public office. Shami lost to former Mayor Bill White in Democratic Primary by over a 60% margin.

Shami has had controversial moments on the campaign trail. Most notably, when asked if he believed it was possible the U.S. government had involvement in the September 11 attacks in 2001, Shami stated that he was "not sure" if the U.S. government was behind the bombing or not. After being given a chance to clarify his statement, Shami again stated the jury was out and refused to rule out the possibility. In the same interview with a Dallas radio station, Shami stated that he mostly hired blacks and Hispanics because he does not believe that whites wanted to work on factory floors. He stated that white people would want positions as supervisors or would want to be paid more than their counterparts.

Shami was a member of the board of the American Task Force on Palestine; he resigned in 2010.

== Relationship with Donald Trump ==
Shami has described himself as "Trump’s friend of 12 years" and has a long business relationship with Donald Trump through The Miss USA/Miss Universe pageants and Celebrity Apprentice. In June 2015, Farouk Systems withdrew advertising sponsorship of the Miss USA pageant due to Donald Trump's anti-Hispanic comments, although Farouk System products continued to be used by contestants at the event. In December 2015, Farouk Systems returned as a sponsor of the event.
