= Beit Liqya =

- Municipality type C

Arabic transcription(s)
  - Arabic: بيت لقيا
  - Latin: Beit Liqya (official); Bayt Liqya (unofficial)
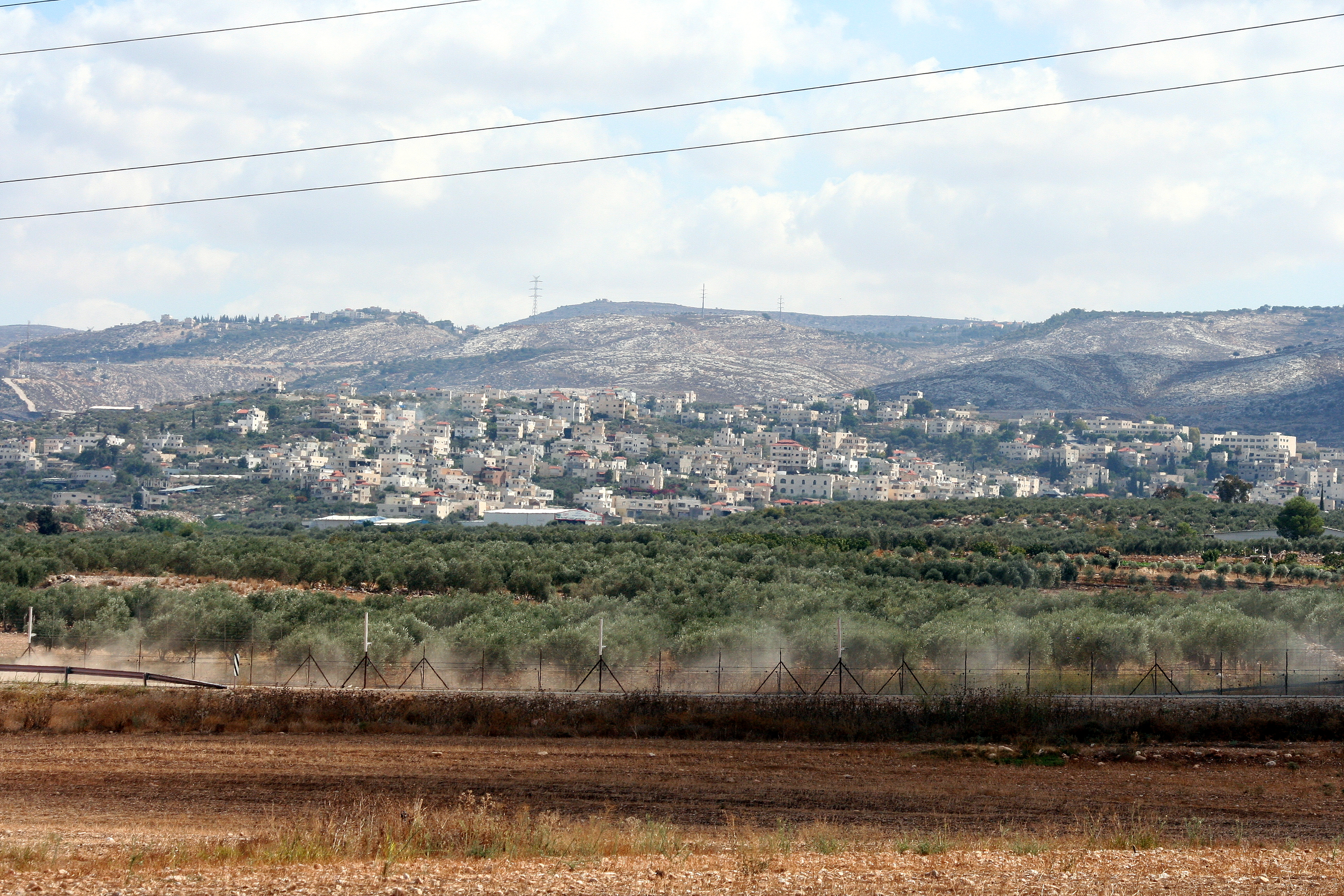

- Location of Beit Liqya within Palestine
- Coordinates: 31°52′09″N 35°04′01″E
- Palestine grid: 156/141
- State: State of Palestine
- Governorate: Ramallah and al-Bireh

Government
  - Type: Municipality
  - Head of Municipality: Areej Assi

Population (2017)
  - Total: 9,304
- Name meaning: "The house of Likia"

Beit Liqya (Arabic: بيت لقيا) is a Palestinian town located in the Ramallah and al-Bireh Governorate in the northern West Bank. According to the Palestinian Central Bureau of Statistics, it had a population of approximately 9,304 in 2017.

Beit Liqya is located 13.5 km southwest of Ramallah. It is bordered by Beit ‘Anan and Beit ‘Ur al Foqa to the east, Kharbatha al Misbah to the north, Beit Sira and Beit Nuba to the west, and Beit Nuba and Kharayib Umm al Lahim to the south.

== History ==
The name Beit Liqya /Bēt liqya/ might be, in its current form, of Aramaic extraction.

In 1882, Conder and Kitchener suggested identifying Beit Liqya with the biblical Eltekeh of Joshua 19:44. However, later researchers have suggested Tel Shalaf, north of Ge'alya as the location of Eltekeh.

It has been suggested that Beit Liqya is identical with Kefar Lekitaia, referenced in Lamentations Rabbah as one of the three stations set up by Hadrian to catch fugitives from Bethar during the Bar Kokhba revolt. Safrai, on the other hand, preferred to identify Lekitaia with Khirbet el-Qutt, a ruin located 1 km south of Al-Lubban ash-Sharqiya, where a Jewish ritual bath was discovered.

=== Medieval period ===
In the early 1200, the revenues from Beit Liqya were given as a waqf designated for the Al-Haram al-Sharif.

=== Ottoman era ===
Beit Liqya, like the rest of Palestine, was incorporated into the Ottoman Empire in 1517. Administratively, Beit Liqya, and its two agricultural dependencies : Mazra'at Beyt Nushif and Mazra'at Rakubis, belonged to the Sub-district of Ramla in the District of Gaza. Jerusalem. In 1552, the revenues of the village were designated for the new waqf of Hasseki Sultan Imaret in Jerusalem, established by Hasseki Hurrem Sultan (Roxelana), the wife of Suleiman the Magnificent.

The ottoman endowment deed of Hasseki Sultan's imaret in Jerusalem (1552) records the place name Manzalat al-ʽrmwy’t /Manzilit il-ʽUrmawiyāt/, “the camping ground of the ‘Urmawis (residents of 'Urma)", near Beit Liqya. The place-name possibly carries the name of people originally from Khirbet el-'Ormeh

In 1838 Beit Lukia was noted as a Muslim village, located in the Beni Malik area, west of Jerusalem.

The French explorer Victor Guérin visited the village in the 1863, and estimated that it had around five hundred inhabitants. He also noted a wali for a Sheikh Abou Ismail. An official Ottoman village list from about 1870, showed that "Bet Lukja" had a total of 109 houses and a population of 347, though the population count included only men.

In 1883, the PEF's Survey of Western Palestine described Beit Likia as a "small village on a main road at the foot of the hills, supplied by cisterns. There are ancient foundations among the houses."

=== British Mandate era ===
In the 1922 census of Palestine conducted by the British Mandate authorities, Beit Leqia had a population of 739, all Muslim, increasing by the time of 1931 census, when Beit Liqya had 209 occupied houses and a population of 858, still all Muslim.

In the 1945 statistics the population was 1,040, all Muslims, while the total land area was 14,358 dunams, according to an official land and population survey. Of this, 1,918 were allocated for plantations and irrigable land, 6,469 for cereals, while 39 dunams were classified as built-up (urban) areas.

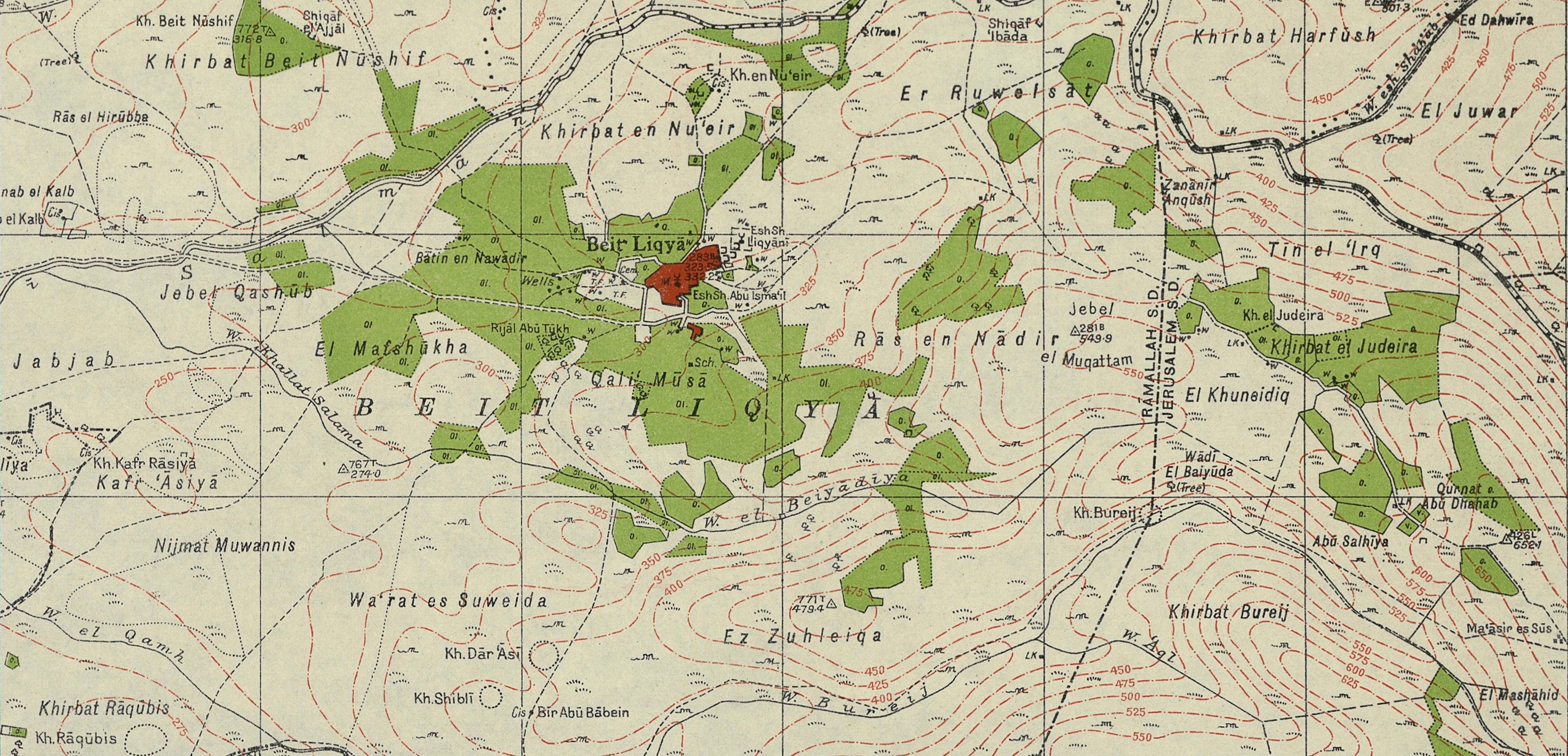
Beit Liqya 1944 1:20,000 from 1919 survey

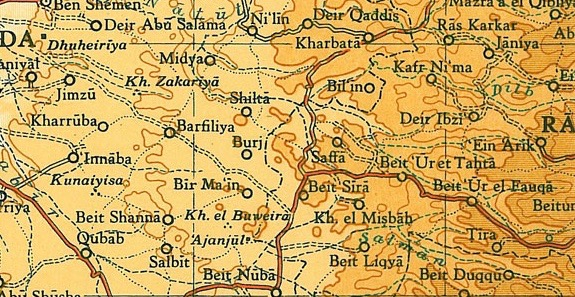
Beit Liqya 1945 1:250,000 (bottom right quadrant)

=== Jordanian era ===
In the wake of the 1948 Arab–Israeli War, and after the 1949 Armistice Agreements, Beit Liqya came under Jordanian rule.

In the early 1950s, some people from Beit Liqya moved to Jerusalem after hearing about empty homes in the then-depopulated Jewish Quarter of the Old City, joining Palestinian refugees. As a result, although Beit Liqya itself was not occupied or depopulated in 1948, some of its residents now live in the Shu'fat Refugee Camp.

In 1961, the population of Beit Liqya was 1,727.

=== Post-1967 ===
Since the Six-Day War in 1967, Beit Liqya has been under Israeli occupation.

After the 1995 accords, 10.4% of the land of Beit Liqya was classified as Area B, the remaining 89.6% as Area C.

Jamal 'Asi (15 years old) and U'dai 'Asi (14 years old) were killed by the Israeli Army in 2005 near the Israeli West Bank barrier. UN Secretary-General Kofi Annan welcomed Israel's announcement that an involved IDF officer was suspended, and that a full investigation of the incident would take place.

Later the same year, their 15-year-old cousin Mahyoub al-Asi was killed by a civilian security guard, "whom he knew." He was tending the family vineyard. His brother was also killed by a mine explosion near the village several years ago.

On October 16, 2014, Israeli forces shot and killed the 13-year-old Palestinian boy Bahaa Badr in the village near the dividing line with Israel. Bahaa Badr was shot in the chest and died 20 minutes after arriving at the hospital.

== Bibliography ==
- Barron, J.B., ed. (1923). Palestine: Report and General Abstracts of the Census of 1922. Government of Palestine.
- Canaan, T. (1927). Mohammedan Saints and Sanctuaries in Palestine. London: Luzac & Co. (pp. 4, 8, 16, 58)
- Conder, C.R.; Kitchener, H.H. (1883). The Survey of Western Palestine: Memoirs of the Topography, Orography, Hydrography, and Archaeology. Vol. 3. London: Committee of the Palestine Exploration Fund.
- Government of Jordan, Department of Statistics (1964). First Census of Population and Housing. Volume I: Final Tables; General Characteristics of the Population (PDF).
- Government of Palestine, Department of Statistics (1945). Village Statistics, April, 1945.
- Guérin, V. (1868). Description Géographique Historique et Archéologique de la Palestine (in French). Vol. 1: Judee, pt. 1. Paris: L'Imprimerie Nationale.
- Hadawi, S. (1970), Village Statistics of 1945: A Classification of Land and Area ownership in Palestine, Palestine Liberation Organization Research Centre
- Hartmann, M. (1883). "Die Ortschaftenliste des Liwa Jerusalem in dem türkischen Staatskalender für Syrien auf das Jahr 1288 der Flucht (1871)". Zeitschrift des Deutschen Palästina-Vereins. 6: 102–149.
- Mills, E., ed. (1932). Census of Palestine 1931. Population of Villages, Towns and Administrative Areas. Jerusalem: Government of Palestine.
- Palmer, E.H. (1881). The Survey of Western Palestine: Arabic and English Name Lists Collected During the Survey by Lieutenants Conder and Kitchener, R. E. Transliterated and Explained by E.H. Palmer. Committee of the Palestine Exploration Fund.
- Robinson, E.; Smith, E. (1841). Biblical Researches in Palestine, Mount Sinai and Arabia Petraea: A Journal of Travels in the year 1838. Vol. 3. Boston: Crocker & Brewster.
- Shihab al-Umari (1932). "A medieval Arabic description of the Haram of Jerusalem". Quarterly of the Department of Antiquities in Palestine. 1: 44–51.
- Singer, A. (2002). Constructing Ottoman Beneficence: An Imperial Soup Kitchen in Jerusalem. Albany: State University of New York Press. ISBN 0-7914-5352-9.
- Socin, A. (1879). "Alphabetisches Verzeichniss von Ortschaften des Paschalik Jerusalem". Zeitschrift des Deutschen Palästina-Vereins. 2: 135–163.
- Toledano, E. (1984). "The Sanjaq of Jerusalem in the Sixteenth Century: Aspects of Topography and Population". Archivum Ottomanicum. 9: 279–319. Archived from the original on 2016-03-05.
