= Kharbatha al-Misbah =

Arab village in the Ramallah and al-Bireh Governate

- Municipality type D (Village council)

Arabic transcription(s)
  - Arabic: خربثا المصباح
  - Latin: Kharbatha al-Misbah (official); Khirbet al-Misbah, Khurbetha ibn es Seba (unofficial)
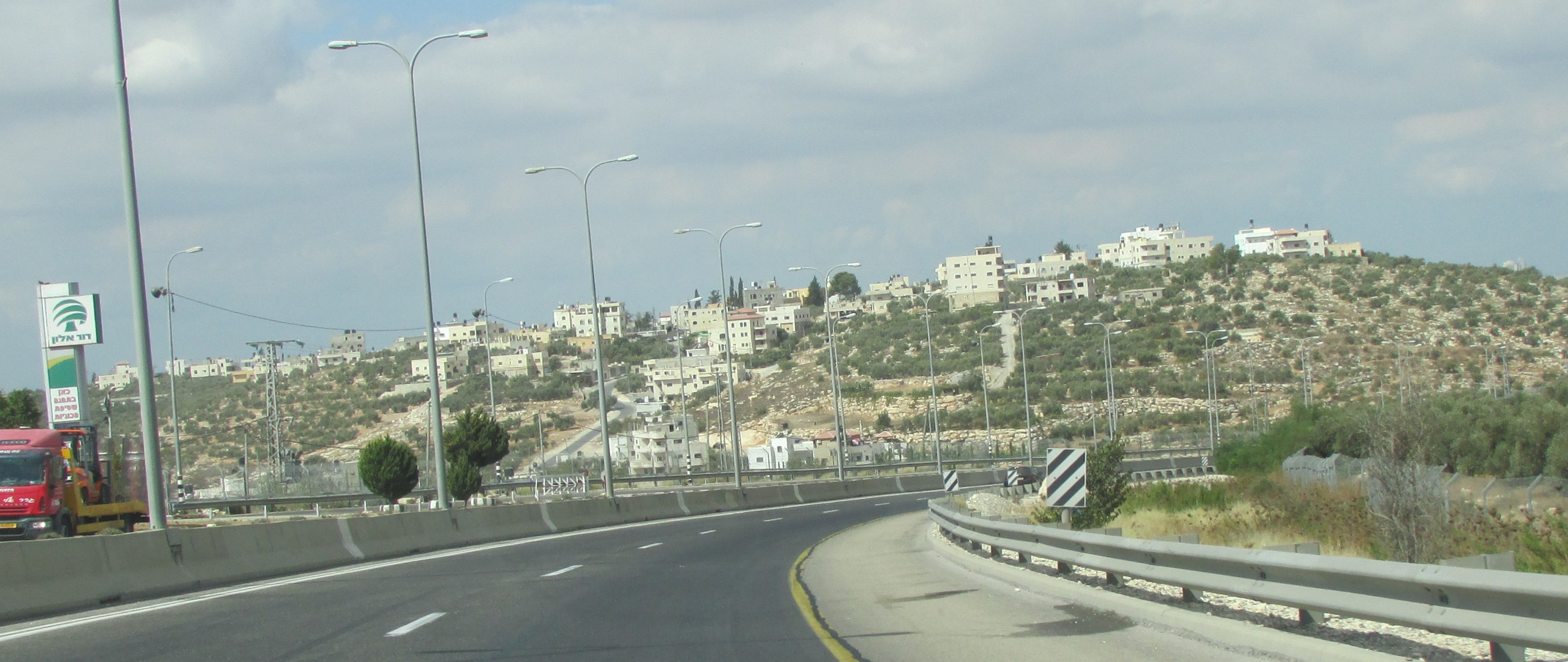
- Kharbatha al-Misbah, east entrance

- Location of Kharbatha al-Misbah within Palestine
- Coordinates: 31°53′5″N 35°04′18″E
- Palestine grid: 156/143
- State: State of Palestine
- Governorate: Ramallah and al-Bireh

Government
  - Type: Village council
  - Head of Municipality: Sa'di Jabir Ibrahim Daraj

Area
  - Total: 4.4 km^{2} (1.7 sq mi)
- Elevation: 390 m (1,280 ft)

Population (2017)
  - Total: 6,366
  - Density: 1,400/km^{2} (3,700/sq mi)
- Name meaning: "The Ruins of the son of the wild beast, or "of seven""

Kharbatha al-Misbah (Arabic: خربثا المصباح) is a Palestinian town in the central West Bank, located 12.5 kilometers (7.8 mi) west of Ramallah in the Ramallah and al-Bireh Governorate. According to the Palestinian Central Bureau of Statistics, the town had a population of 6,366 in 2017. It has a total land area of 4,431 dunams, of which 644 are built-up areas and the remainder agricultural lands and forests.

== Location ==
Kharbatha al Misbah is located 12.5 kilometers (7.8 mi) west of Ramallah. It is bordered by Beit Ur al Fauqa to the east, Beit Ur at Tahta to the north, Beit Sira to the west, and Beit Liqya to the south.

== Etymology ==
Ḫarbatā /Ḫarbata/ is an Aramaic toponym meaning “the ruin”. The second part of the name means "lamp".

== History ==
In 1838, it was noted as a Muslim village called Khurbata in the Lydda administrative region.

In 1863, Victor Guérin found 400 inhabitants, along with ruins identified as the remains of a Christian church. He further noted five or six cisterns as well as ancient tombs. He described it an ancient place founded on the site of a Hebrew settlement whose original name had been lost.

Albert Socin found an official Ottoman village list from 1870 that shows Charabta, in the Lydda district, had a population of 194 living in 71 houses, although the count included only men. Hartmann gives the number of houses as 78.

In 1882, the PEF's Survey of Western Palestine described the village, then called Khurbetha ibn es Seba, as "a small village on a ridge, with a well to the east."

=== British Mandate era ===
In the 1922 census of Palestine, conducted by the British Mandate authorities, Kherbet al-Mesbah had a population of 369, all Muslim. In the 1931 census it had increased to a population of 488, still all Muslim, in 121 inhabited houses.

In the 1945 statistics, the population of Khirbat el Misbah was 600, all Muslims, who owned 4,438 dunams of land according to an official land and population survey. 1,026 dunams were plantations and irrigable land, 2,133 used for cereals, while 25 dunams were built-up (urban) land.

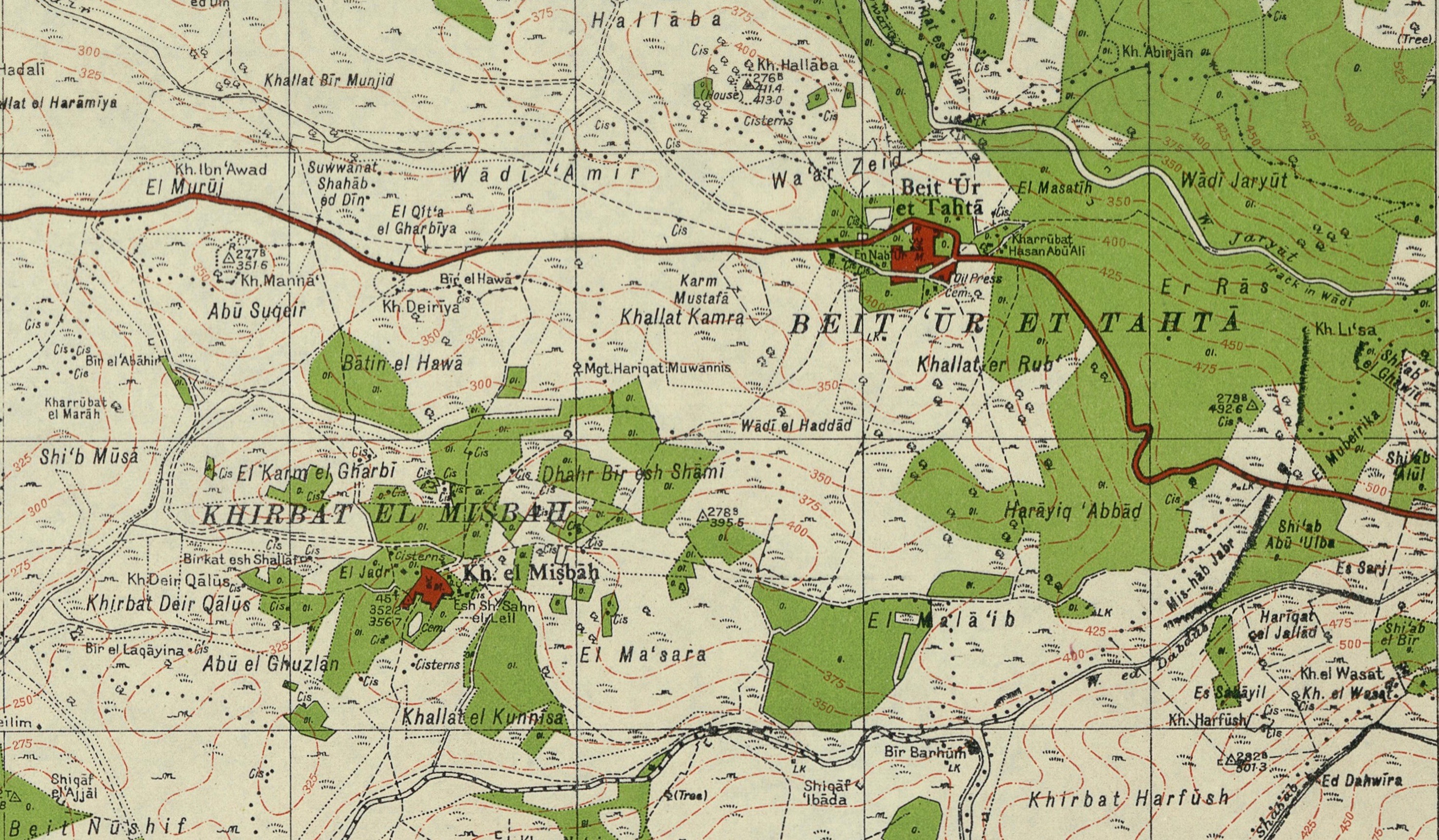
Khirbat el Misbah 1944 1:20,000 from 1919 survey

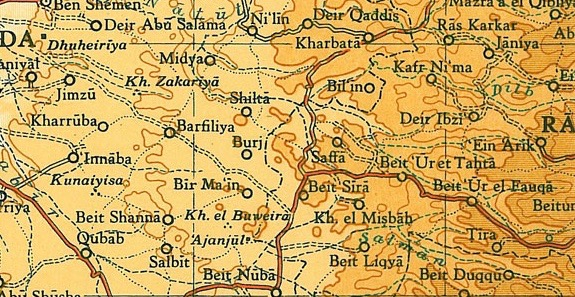
Khirbat el Misbah 1945 1:250,000 (bottom right quadrant)

=== Jordanian era ===
In the wake of the 1948 Arab–Israeli War, and after the 1949 Armistice Agreements, Kharbatha al-Misbah came under Jordanian rule.

The Jordanian census of 1961 found 942 inhabitants in Kh. Misbah.

There are two mosques in the town: Omri Mosque and al-Kawthar Mosque. The former was built atop the ruins of an ancient church and was renovated in 1965. Within the town, still lay Ancient Roman cemeteries. It has been governed by a village council.

=== 1967-present ===
Since the Six-Day War in 1967, Kharbatha al-Misbah has been under Israeli occupation.

After the 1995 accords, 19% of village land was classified as Area B, while the remaining 81% was classified as Area C. Israel has confiscated 61 dunams of village land in order to build the Israeli settlement of Beit Horon.

== See also ==
- Kharbatha Bani Harith

== Bibliography ==
- Barron, J.B., ed. (1923). Palestine: Report and General Abstracts of the Census of 1922. Government of Palestine.
- Conder, C.R.; Kitchener, H.H. (1883). The Survey of Western Palestine: Memoirs of the Topography, Orography, Hydrography, and Archaeology. Vol. 3. London: Committee of the Palestine Exploration Fund.
- Government of Jordan, Department of Statistics (1964). First Census of Population and Housing. Volume I: Final Tables; General Characteristics of the Population (PDF).
- Government of Palestine, Department of Statistics (1945). Village Statistics, April, 1945.
- Guérin, V. (1868). Description Géographique Historique et Archéologique de la Palestine (in French). Vol. 1: Judee, pt. 1. Paris: L'Imprimerie Nationale.
- Hadawi, S. (1970). Village Statistics of 1945: A Classification of Land and Area ownership in Palestine. Palestine Liberation Organization Research Center. Archived from the original on 2018-12-08.
- Hartmann, M. (1883). "Die Ortschaftenliste des Liwa Jerusalem in dem türkischen Staatskalender für Syrien auf das Jahr 1288 der Flucht (1871)". Zeitschrift des Deutschen Palästina-Vereins. 6: 102–149.
- Mills, E., ed. (1932). Census of Palestine 1931. Population of Villages, Towns and Administrative Areas. Jerusalem: Government of Palestine.
- Palmer, E.H. (1881). The Survey of Western Palestine: Arabic and English Name Lists Collected During the Survey by Lieutenants Conder and Kitchener, R. E. Transliterated and Explained by E.H. Palmer. Committee of the Palestine Exploration Fund.
- Robinson, E.; Smith, E. (1841). Biblical Researches in Palestine, Mount Sinai and Arabia Petraea: A Journal of Travels in the year 1838. Vol. 3. Boston: Crocker & Brewster.
- Socin, A. (1879). "Alphabetisches Verzeichniss von Ortschaften des Paschalik Jerusalem". Zeitschrift des Deutschen Palästina-Vereins. 2: 135–163.
