= Beit Sira =

- Municipality type D (Village council)

Arabic transcription(s)
  - Arabic: بيت سيرا
  - Latin: Bayt Sira (official)
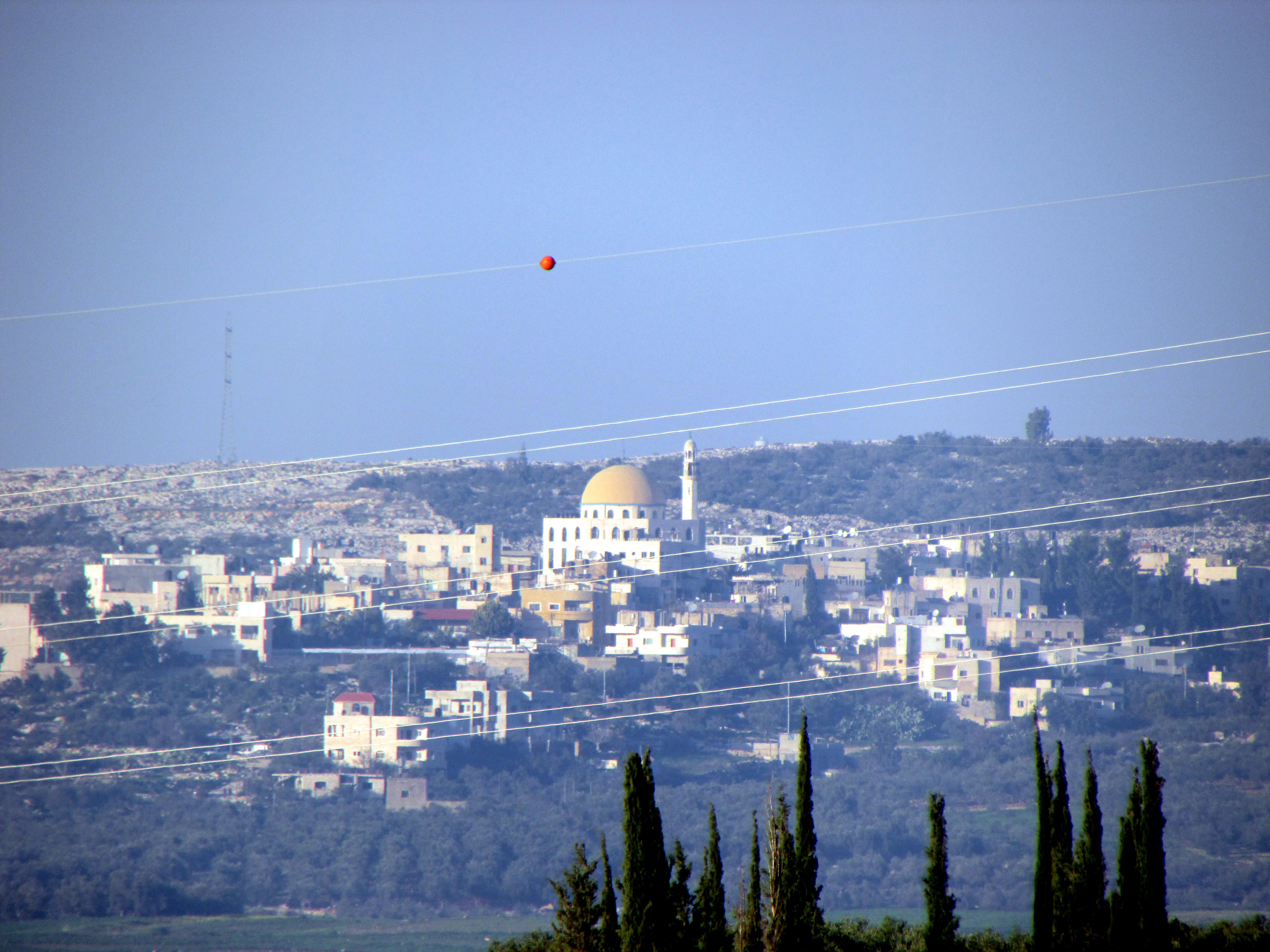
- Beit Sira

- Location of Beit Sira within Palestine
- Coordinates: 31°53′15″N 35°02′39″E
- Palestine grid: 154/143
- State: State of Palestine
- Governorate: Ramallah and al-Bireh

Government
  - Type: Village council

Area
  - Total: 3.1 km^{2} (1.2 sq mi)

Population (2017)
  - Total: 3,343
  - Density: 1,100/km^{2} (2,800/sq mi)
- Name meaning: The house of the fold

Beit Sira (Arabic: بيت سيرا) is a Palestinian village in the central West Bank, located 22 kilometers west of Ramallah and is a part of the Ramallah and al-Bireh Governorate. The village is situated along the Green Line. During the 1948 Arab-Israeli War, around 4,000 dunams of its land became a part of the "No-Man's Land" strip between the north-central West Bank and Israel. Currently Beit Sira's jurisdiction is 3,120 dunams, of which 441 dunams are built-up areas and the remainder is open spaces for future construction or agricultural land.

== Etymology ==
According to Palmer, Beit Sira means "The house of the fold". Bayt Sīrā /Bēt Sīra/ is an ancient toponymic survival, meaning House of Sira. The second part of the name may originate from the Biblical female name Š’rh (< *ši’r-at).

== Location ==
Beit Sira is located 14.9 kilometers (9.3 mi) (horizontally) west of Ramallah. It is bordered by Kharbatha al-Misbah, Beit Liqya, and Beit Ur al-Tahta to the east, Saffa to the north, the Green Line (the Armistice Line 1949) to the west, and Bayt Nuba to the south.

== History ==
=== Ottoman Era ===
In the 1596 tax records, Beit Sira was a part of the nahiya ("subdistrict") of Ramla, part of Gaza Sanjak, in the Ottoman Empire, with a population of 17 Muslim household. The villagers paid a fixed tax-rate of 25% on agricultural products, including wheat, barley, summer crops, vineyards, fruit trees, goats and beehives, in addition to occasional revenues; a total of 4,500 akçe. All of the revenue went to a Waqf.

In 1838, it was noted as a Muslim village in the Ibn Humar District, part of the er-Ramleh area.

In 1863 Victor Guérin noted Beit Sira as a considerable village on the summit of a rocky hill. A saint, revered under the name of Neby Sira, had a sanctuary there with his tomb. Socin, citing an official Ottoman village list compiled around 1870, noted that Bet Sira had 39 houses and a population of 125, though the population count included only men. Hartmann found that Bet Sira had 29 houses.

In 1873, Clermont-Ganneau was told that Beit Sira supposedly housed the tomb of Neby Sira, a son of Jacob and brother to Neby Ma'in (possibly Benjamin), the founder of Bir Ma'in.

In 1883, the PEF's Survey of Western Palestine (SWP) described it: "A small village on a swell in the low hills. A main road passes through it. The water supply is artificial."

=== British Mandate era ===
In the 1922 census of Palestine conducted by the British Mandate authorities, Beit Sira had a population of 381 Muslims, increasing in the 1931 census to 460 Muslims in 113 houses.

In the 1945 statistics the population was 540, all Muslims, while the total land area was 4,687 dunams, according to an official land and population survey. Of this, 205 dunams were plantations and irrigable land, 1,924 for cereals, while 23 dunams were classified as built-up (urban) areas.

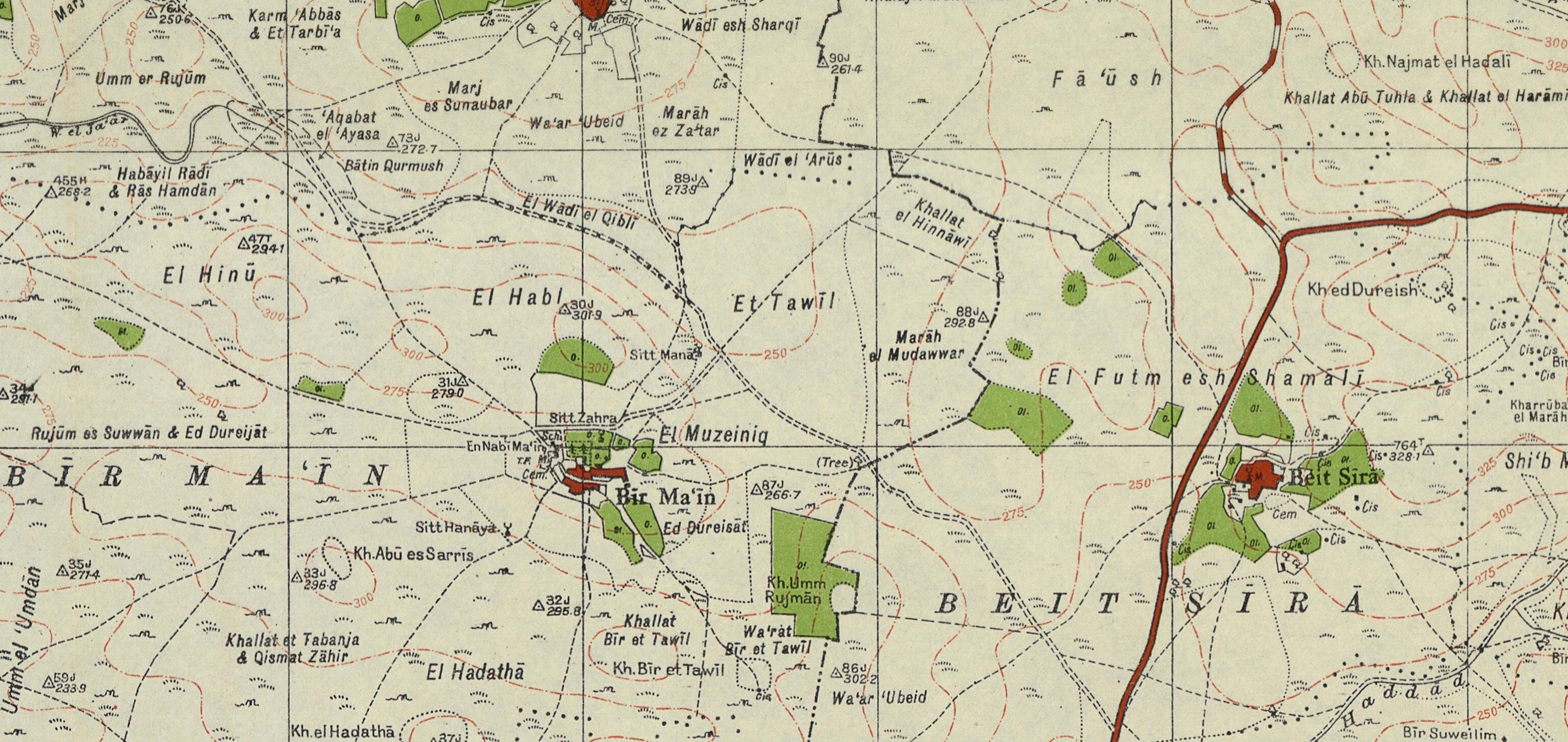
Beit Sira 1944 1:20,000 from 1919 survey

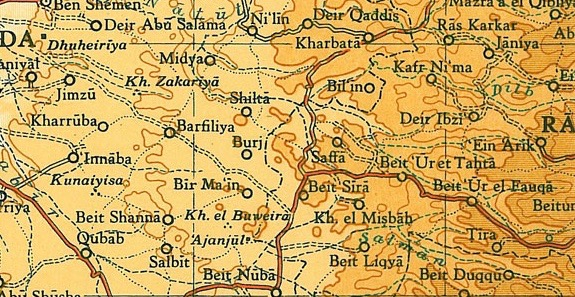
Beit Sira 1945 1:250,000

=== Jordanian era ===
In the wake of the 1948 Arab–Israeli War, and after the 1949 Armistice Agreements, Beit Sira came under Jordanian rule.

The Jordanian census of 1961 found 746 inhabitants in Beit Sira.

=== Israeli occupation ===
Since the Six-Day War in 1967, Beit Sira has been under Israeli occupation.

After the 1995 accords, 9.3% of Beit Sira land was classified as Area B, the remaining 90.7% as Area C. In 2012, approximately 78% of the village population worked in the Israel labor market. Israel has confiscated 1,499 dunams of land from Beit Sira for the construction of the Israeli settlement of Maccabim, presently part of Modi'in-Maccabim-Re'ut.

According to the Palestinian Central Bureau of Statistics, Beit Sira had a population of 2,840 inhabitants in 2006. In the 2007 PCBS census, there were 2,749 people living in the town. By 2017, the population was 3,343.

== Bibliography ==
- Barron, J.B., ed. (1923). Palestine: Report and General Abstracts of the Census of 1922. Government of Palestine.
- Conder, C.R.; Kitchener, H.H. (1883). The Survey of Western Palestine: Memoirs of the Topography, Orography, Hydrography, and Archaeology. Vol. 3. London: Committee of the Palestine Exploration Fund.
- Government of Jordan, Department of Statistics (1964). First Census of Population and Housing. Volume I: Final Tables; General Characteristics of the Population (PDF).
- Government of Palestine, Department of Statistics (1945). Village Statistics, April, 1945.
- Guérin, V. (1868). Description Géographique Historique et Archéologique de la Palestine (in French). Vol. 1: Judee, pt. 1. Paris: L'Imprimerie Nationale.
- Hadawi, S. (1970). Village Statistics of 1945: A Classification of Land and Area ownership in Palestine. Palestine Liberation Organization Research Center.
- Hartmann, M. (1883). "Die Ortschaftenliste des Liwa Jerusalem in dem türkischen Staatskalender für Syrien auf das Jahr 1288 der Flucht (1871)". Zeitschrift des Deutschen Palästina-Vereins. 6: 102–149.
- Hütteroth, W.-D.; Abdulfattah, K. (1977). Historical Geography of Palestine, Transjordan and Southern Syria in the Late 16th Century. Erlanger Geographische Arbeiten, Sonderband 5. Erlangen, Germany: Vorstand der Fränkischen Geographischen Gesellschaft. ISBN 3-920405-41-2.
- Mills, E., ed. (1932). Census of Palestine 1931. Population of Villages, Towns and Administrative Areas. Jerusalem: Government of Palestine.
- Palmer, E.H. (1881). The Survey of Western Palestine: Arabic and English Name Lists Collected During the Survey by Lieutenants Conder and Kitchener, R. E. Transliterated and Explained by E.H. Palmer. Committee of the Palestine Exploration Fund.
- Robinson, E.; Smith, E. (1841). Biblical Researches in Palestine, Mount Sinai and Arabia Petraea: A Journal of Travels in the year 1838. Vol. 3. Boston: Crocker & Brewster.
- Socin, A. (1879). "Alphabetisches Verzeichniss von Ortschaften des Paschalik Jerusalem". Zeitschrift des Deutschen Palästina-Vereins. 2: 135–163.
