= Beit Horon =

Israeli settlement in the West Bank

Beit Horon: בֵּית חֹורוֹן (Hebrew)
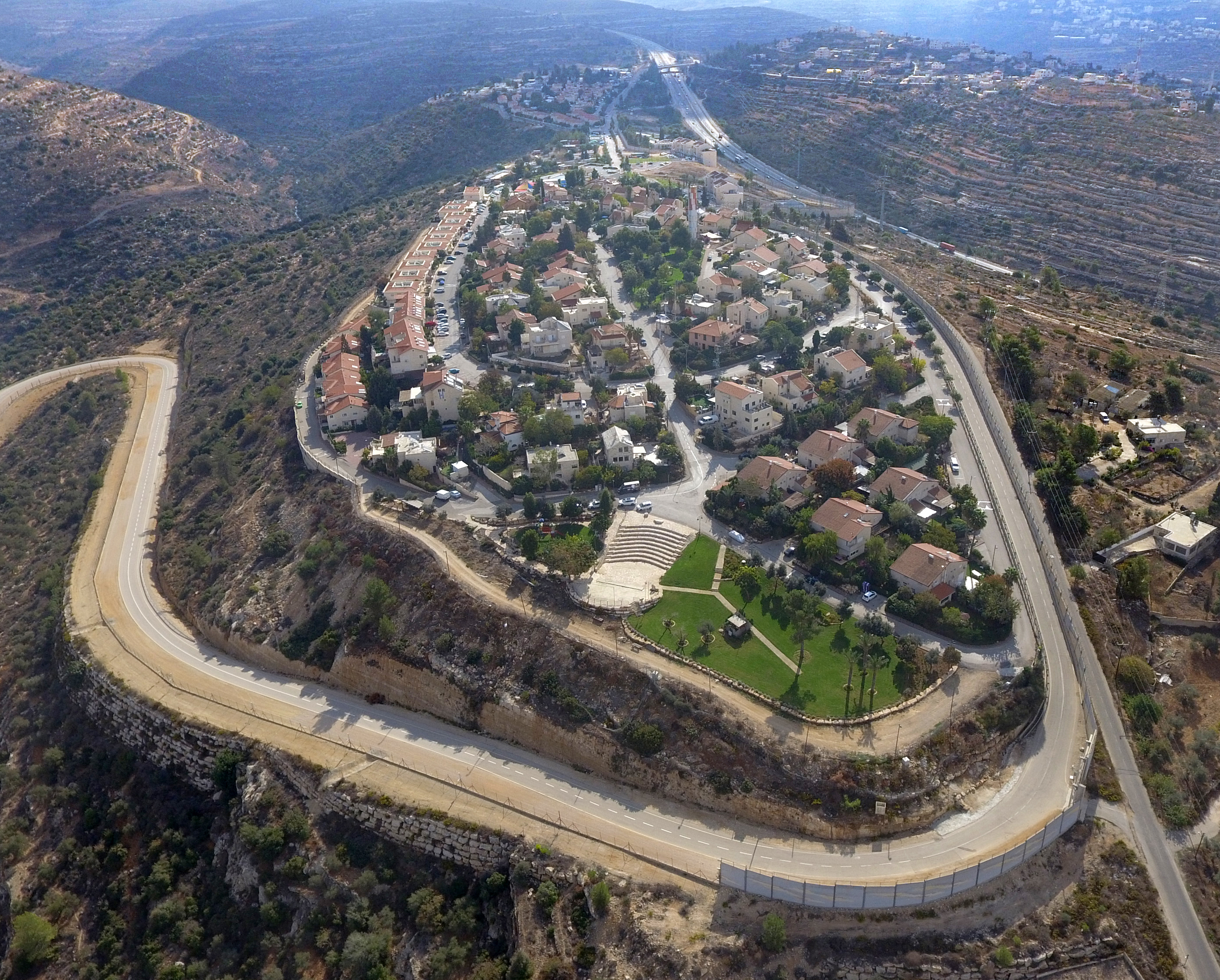

- Location within the Central West Bank Location within the West Bank
- Coordinates: 31°52′36″N 35°7′43″E
- Country: Palestine
- District: Judea and Samaria Area
- Council: Mateh Binyamin
- Region: West Bank
- Affiliation: Amana
- Founded: 1977
- Population (2024): 1,435

Beit Horon (Hebrew: בֵּית חֹורוֹן, lit. 'House of Horon') is a communal Israeli settlement in the West Bank. Bordering Route 443 between Modi'in and Jerusalem, the biblical pass of Beit Horon (Joshua 10:10), after which it is named, it falls under the jurisdiction of Mateh Binyamin Regional Council. In 2024 it had a population of 1,435.

The international community considers Israeli settlements in the West Bank illegal under international law, but the Israeli government disputes this.

== History ==
Beit Horon was established on 1 December 1977.

According to ARIJ, Israel confiscated land from several surrounding Palestinian villages in order to construct Beit Horon:

- 1036 dunams were taken from Beitunia, for Beit Horon and Giv'at Ze'ev,
- 863 dunams were taken from Beit Ur al-Fauqa,
- 67 dunams were taken from At-Tira,
- 61 dunams were taken from Kharbatha al-Misbah.

Beit Horon is a joint Secular and Orthodox community. A religious elementary school located in Beit Horon serves local children as well as those from surrounding villages. There are also three nurseries and kindergarten, two synagogues, a kollel, a mikvah for women and men, and a library.

On 23 September 2026, the son of Israel's ambassador to the U.S., Yechiel Leiter, was critically injured in a car-ramming attack by a Palestinian near Beit Horon. Hamas praised the attack as a "heroic operation", but didn't claim responsibility.

== See also ==
- Battle of Beth Horon (166 BC)
- Battle of Beth Horon (66)
