= Beit Ur al-Fauqa =

- Municipality type C

Arabic transcription(s)
  - Arabic: بيت عور الفوقا
  - Latin: Bayt ’Ur al-Fauqa (official); Beit ’Ur al-Foqa; Bayt ‘Ūr al-Fawqā
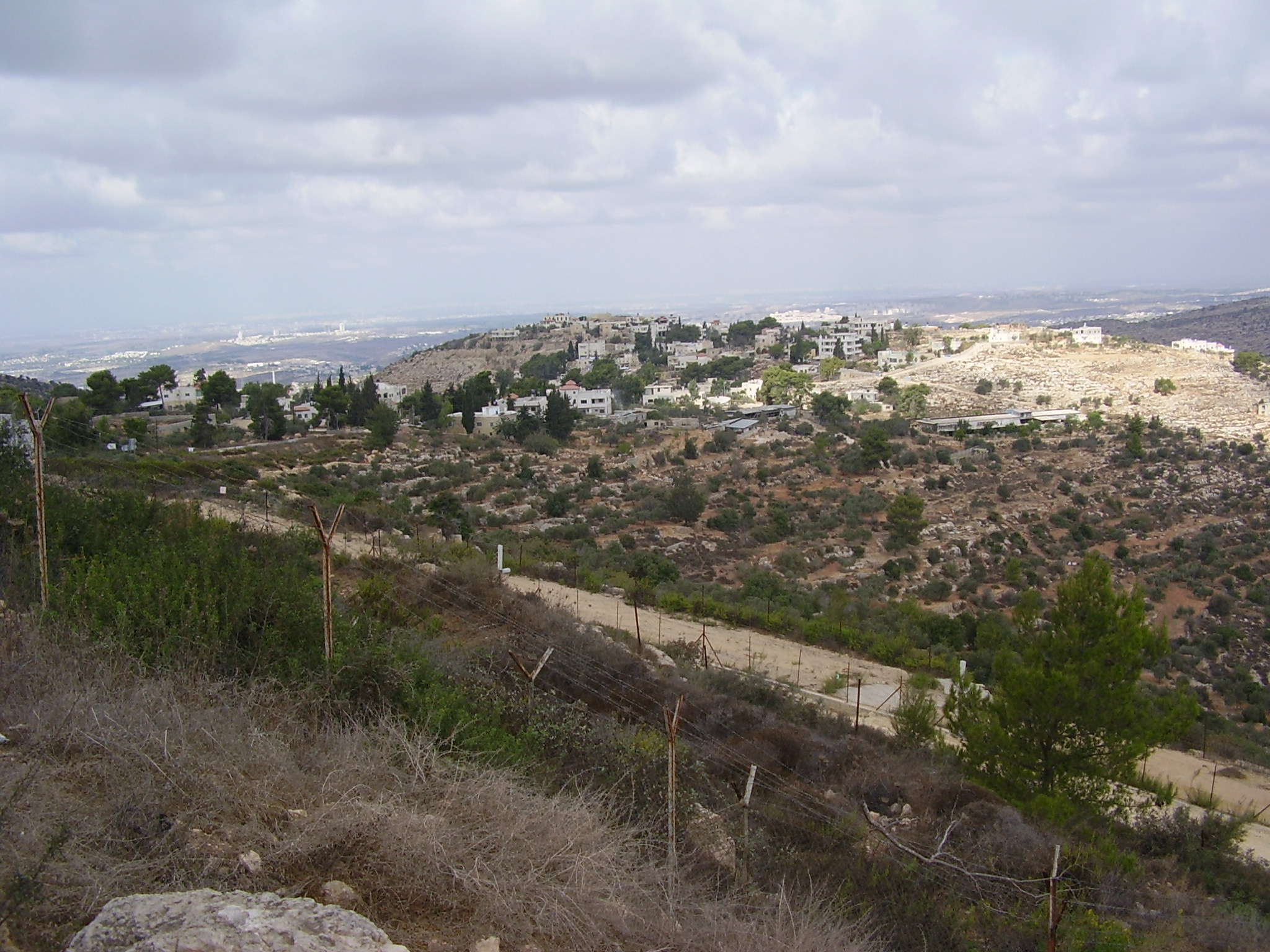

- Location of Beit Ur al-Fauqa within Palestine
- Coordinates: 31°53′09″N 35°06′51″E
- Palestine grid: 160/143
- State: State of Palestine
- Governorate: Ramallah and al-Bireh

Government
  - Type: Municipality
- Elevation: 597 m (1,959 ft)

Population (2017)
  - Total: 1,049
- Name meaning: "Upper House of Ur"

Beit Ur al-Fauqa (Arabic: بيت عور الفوقا) is a Palestinian village located in the Ramallah and al-Bireh Governorate of the State of Palestine, in the northern West Bank, 14 kilometers (8.7 mi) west of Ramallah and 3 kilometers (1.9 mi) southeast of Beit Ur al-Tahta.

Beit 'Ur al-Fauqa is identified with the ancient town of Upper Bethoron, with archaeological evidence dating its origins to the Iron Age. Positioned on two hilltops near Route 443, the historic "ascent of Bethoron" pass, the site witnessed significant battles in biblical times and later during the Maccabean Revolt and the First Jewish–Roman War due to its strategic importance.

During the later Roman and Byzantine periods, the town's significance waned, and by the early 5th century, it had become a small village, as noted by Jerome. Eventually, this settlement was abandoned, with no mention in Arabic sources, though remains from the Crusader and Ayyubid periods have been found here. The current village is a modern settlement that were once a small hamlet until the latter half of the 20th century.

Today, Beit 'Ur al-Fauqa is a small village, with most residents tracing their origins to Dura. Since 1967, it has been under Israeli occupation, with its territory split between Area B and Area C following the Oslo Accords. According to the Palestinian Central Bureau of Statistics, it had a population of 1,049 in the 2017 census.

== Location and geography ==
Beit Ur al-Fauqa is located 8.4 kilometers (5.2 mi) west of Ramallah. It is bordered by Beituniya to the east, Deir Ibzi to the north, Beit Ur at-Tahta and Kharbatha al-Misbah to the west, and at-Tira and Beit Anan to the south.

The villages of Beit Ur crown two hilltops, less than 2 miles (3.2 km) apart (with Beit Ur al-Fauqa some 245 meters (804 ft) higher than Beit Ur al-Tahta) along Route 443, the biblical "ascent of Bethoron". For many centuries, the villages occupying their sites dominated one of the most historic roads in history. The ridge way of Bethoron climbs from the plain of Aijalon (the modern Yalo) to Beit Ur al-Tahta at 370 meters (1,210 ft); it then carries on along the ridge, with valleys lying on either side, north and south, before reaching Beit Ur al-Fauqa at 616 meters (2,021 ft). The ridge continues for another 8 kilometers (5.0 mi) arriving at the plateau to the north of al-Jib (biblical Gibeon).

== History ==
=== Ancient period ===
Beit Ur al-Fauqa has been identified as the site of the ancient town of Upper Bethoron. The modern Arabic name preserves part of the biblical name for the village, believed to be the namesake of the Canaanite deity Horon.

Finkelstein and Lederman estimated that the ancient site of the village covers about 1.5 hectares. A large birkeh (pond) north-east in the village is cut in rock. Archaeological findings indicate that Lower Bethoron (Beit Ur al-Tahta) was established before Upper Bethoron; potsherds found in Beit Ur al-Fauqa date from the Iron Age onward, while potsherds from the lower town date from the Late Bronze Age.

=== Classical period ===
Upper Bethoron was the site of three battles of the Jewish Maccabean Revolt against the Seleucid Empire. According to 1 Maccabees, Judas Maccabeus defeated the Syrian general Seron at Lower Bethoron. Six years later, Nicanor, retreating from Jerusalem, was defeated and slain at the site. In the third attempt, Bacchides succeeded in subduing the Hasmoneans and fortified this strategic pass.

In autumn 66 CE, at the start of the First Jewish–Roman War, Cestius Gallus passed through this site on his way to and from Jerusalem. It was in the ravines near Bethoron where the 12th Roman Legion under his command was subsequently ambushed and destroyed by the rebels. After the subjugation of the revolt in 70 CE, the Romans built a fortress in the town to guard the road to Jerusalem.

North of the village lies a series of rock-cut steps, approximately 2.5 meters wide, believed to be part of the ancient Roman road.

During the later Roman period and under the Byzantines, Upper Bethoron lost its importance, becoming a small village by the 5th century CE.

=== Medieval period ===
The village has been identified with the Bethoron Superior or Vetus Betor in the Crusader era. Melisende, Queen of Jerusalem gave it as a fief to Mar Saba. In 1165/64 CE, it was sold to the canons of the Holy Sepulchre. The remains of a tower, Al-Burj, in the village is dated to this era.

An Arabic inscription with a verse from the Qur'an was found on a ruined stone structure in Beit Ur al-Fauqa and is attributed by Moshe Sharon to the Ayyubid period of rule in Palestine.

=== Ottoman period ===
Beit Ur al-Fauqa, like the rest of Palestine, was incorporated into the Ottoman Empire in 1517, and in the census of 1596, the village appeared as being in the Nahiya of Quds of the Liwa of Quds. It had a population of 5 Muslim households and paid a fixed tax rate of 25% on various agricultural products, including wheat, barley, olives, goats and/or beehives; a total of 535 akçe.

In 1838, it was noted as a Muslim village, located in the Beni Malik area, west of Jerusalem.

The French explorer Victor Guérin visited the village in 1863, and he described it as having about 150 inhabitants, and surrounded by gardens of olive trees. He also noted the remains of a small castle. An official Ottoman village list from about 1870 showed that Bet Ur el-Foqa had 53 houses and a population of 159, though it only counted the men.

In 1883, the PEF's Survey of Western Palestine described Beit Ur Al Foka as "A small village built of stone at the end of a spur on a knoll. The ground falls very steeply to the west. The water supply is artificial, and on the north and south are deep valleys. The west view is very extensive, including the sea, the plains of Lydda and Ramleh, and part of the valley of Ajalon."

=== British Mandate period ===
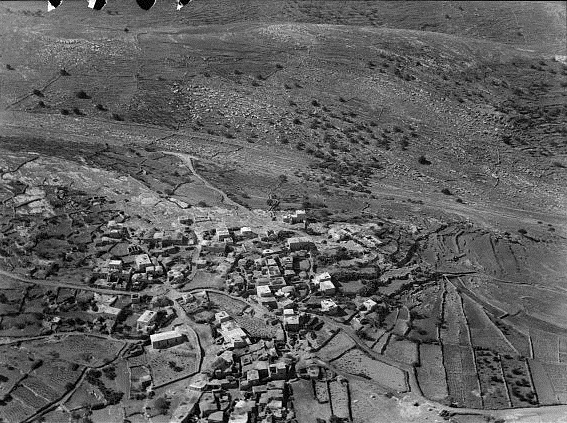
Aerial view of Beit Ur al-Fauqa, 1931

In the 1922 census of Palestine conducted by the British Mandate authorities, Beit 'Ur al-Fuqa had a population of 147, all Muslim. By the time of the 1931 census, Beit 'Ur al-Fauqa had 47 occupied houses and a population of 173, still all Muslim.

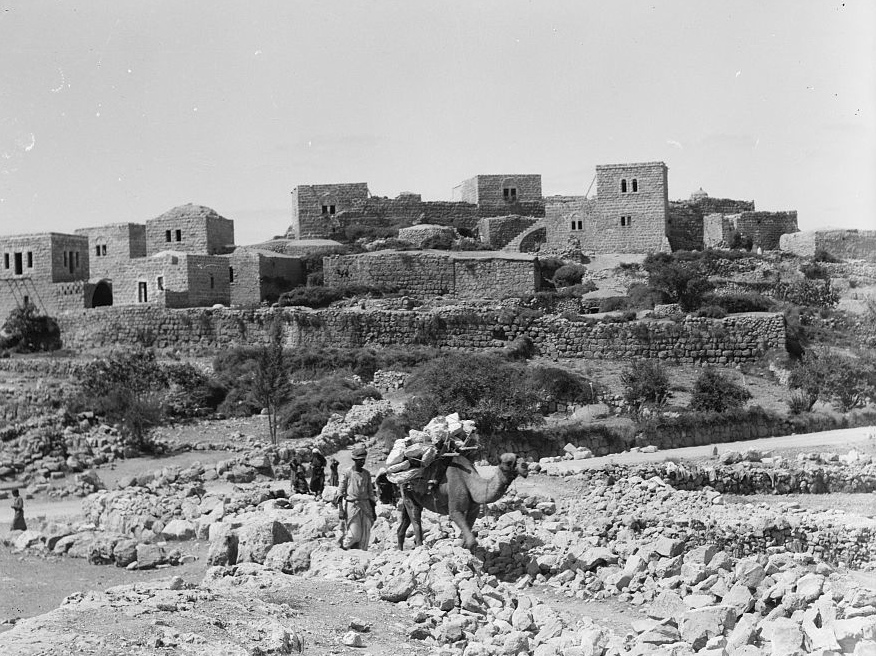
Beit Ur al-Fauqa in the 1930s

In the 1945 village statistics, the population was 210, all Muslims, while the total land area was 3,762 dunams (3.762 km^{2}; 1.453 sq mi), according to an official land and population survey. Of this, 989 dunams (98.9 ha; 244 acres) were allocated for plantations and irrigable land, 1,277 dunams (127.7 ha; 316 acres) for cereals, while 26 dunams (2.6 ha; 6.4 acres) were classified as built-up (urban) areas.

=== Jordanian period ===
In the wake of the 1948 Arab–Israeli War, and after the 1949 Armistice Agreements, Beit Ur al-Fauqa came under Jordanian rule.

The Jordanian census of 1961 found 362 inhabitants here.

=== Post 1967 ===
Since the Six-Day War in 1967, Beit Ur al-Fauqa had been under Israeli occupation. The population of Beit Ur Fouqa in the 1967 census conducted by the Israeli authorities was 298, of whom 37 originated from the Israeli territory.

After the 1995 Oslo II Accord, 12.1% of village land was classified as Area B, while the remaining 87.9% was classified as Area C. Israel has confiscated 863 dunams (86.3 ha; 213 acres) of land from the village in order to construct the Israeli settlement of Beit Horon.

After a settlement road denied them land access to their school, the children of the village now commute to the local al-Tira Beit Ur al-Fuqa high school, which is surrounded by the Israeli separation wall on three sides, through sewage channels. Many village families use to dwell in nearby caves, but to improve their lives they built homes, many of which are now subject to a demolition order after Israel decided to define their area as an archaeological site.

== Demography ==
=== Local origins ===
Most of Beit 'Ur al-Fauqa's residents have their origins in Dura, a town near Hebron.

=== Notable people ===
Here was born and still lives Mrs Muftiyah Tlaib, grandmother of US congresswoman Rashida Tlaib.

== Bibliography ==
- Barron, J.B., ed. (1923). Palestine: Report and General Abstracts of the Census of 1922. Government of Palestine.
- Conder, C.R.; Kitchener, H.H. (1883). The Survey of Western Palestine: Memoirs of the Topography, Orography, Hydrography, and Archaeology. Vol. 3. London: Committee of the Palestine Exploration Fund.
- Finkelstein, I.; Lederman, Zvi, eds. (1997). Highlands of many cultures. Tel Aviv: Institute of Archaeology of Tel Aviv University Publications Section. ISBN 965-440-007-3.
- Goodman, M. (2007). Rome and Jerusalem; The Clash of Ancient Civilizations. Allen Lane. ISBN 978-0-7139-9447-6.
- Government of Jordan, Department of Statistics (1964). First Census of Population and Housing. Volume I: Final Tables; General Characteristics of the Population (PDF).
- Government of Palestine, Department of Statistics (1945). Village Statistics, April, 1945.
- Guérin, V. (1868). Description Géographique Historique et Archéologique de la Palestine (in French). Vol. 1: Judee, pt. 1. Paris: L'Imprimerie Nationale.
- Guérin, V. (1875). Description Géographique Historique et Archéologique de la Palestine (in French). Vol. 2: Samarie, pt. 2. Paris: L'Imprimerie Nationale. (p. 398)
- Hadawi, S. (1970). Village Statistics of 1945: A Classification of Land and Area ownership in Palestine. Palestine Liberation Organization Research Center.
- Hartmann, M. (1883). "Die Ortschaftenliste des Liwa Jerusalem in dem türkischen Staatskalender für Syrien auf das Jahr 1288 der Flucht (1871)". Zeitschrift des Deutschen Palästina-Vereins. 6: 102–149.
- Hütteroth, W.-D.; Abdulfattah, K. (1977). Historical Geography of Palestine, Transjordan and Southern Syria in the Late 16th Century. Erlanger Geographische Arbeiten, Sonderband 5. Erlangen, Germany: Vorstand der Fränkischen Geographischen Gesellschaft. ISBN 3-920405-41-2.
- Mills, E., ed. (1932). Census of Palestine 1931. Population of Villages, Towns and Administrative Areas. Jerusalem: Government of Palestine.
- Palmer, E.H. (1881). The Survey of Western Palestine: Arabic and English Name Lists Collected During the Survey by Lieutenants Conder and Kitchener, R. E. Transliterated and Explained by E.H. Palmer. Committee of the Palestine Exploration Fund.
- Pringle, D. (1997). Secular buildings in the Crusader Kingdom of Jerusalem: an archaeological Gazetteer. Cambridge University Press. ISBN 9780521460101.
- Robinson, E.; Smith, E. (1841). Biblical Researches in Palestine, Mount Sinai and Arabia Petraea: A Journal of Travels in the year 1838. Vol. 3. Boston: Crocker & Brewster.
- de Rozière, E., ed. (1849). Cartulaire de l'église du Saint Sépulchre de Jérusalem: publié d'après les manuscrits du Vatican (in Latin and French). Paris: Imprimerie nationale.
- Röhricht, R. (1893). (RRH) Regesta regni Hierosolymitani (MXCVII-MCCXCI) (in Latin). Berlin: Libraria Academica Wageriana.
- Sharon, M. (1999). Corpus Inscriptionum Arabicarum Palaestinae, B-C. Vol. 2. BRILL. ISBN 9004110836.
- Socin, A. (1879). "Alphabetisches Verzeichniss von Ortschaften des Paschalik Jerusalem". Zeitschrift des Deutschen Palästina-Vereins. 2: 135–163.
