= Ben Shemen Interchange =

Freeway interchange in Israel

Coordinates: 31°57′33″N 34°56′16″E

- מחלף בן שמן

Location
- Ben Shemen
- Roads at junction: Highway 1 Highway 6 Route 443; Route 444

Construction
- Opened: 1981

Ben Shemen Interchange (Hebrew: מחלף בן שמן) is a major freeway interchange complex in central Israel, connecting Highway 1, Highway 6, Route 443 and Route 444, as well as several local roads. The interchange is located near moshav Ben Shemen and Ben Shemen Forest, hence its name. It is one of the largest and most complex interchanges in the country.

== History ==
The interchange first opened as a simple diamond interchange between Highway 1 and Route 443 in 1981. It was improved in 1996 with the addition of two Y interchanges, providing a direct connection between Highway 1 and eastbound Route 443 and creating a short freeway branch off Route 443.

Major construction work took place between 1999 and 2003 as part of the construction of Highway 6. These works included the replacement of the original Route 443 bridge, a new Y interchange with Highway 1 and a new diamond interchange with Route 444. The interchange partially opened on October 28, 2002, with the opening of northbound Highway 6. The interchange fully opened on January 20, 2003.

== Layout ==
Four freeway segments (of three different freeways) and three at-grade segments enter the interchange:

- From the west: Highway 1 (freeway) and Route 443 (at grade)
- From the north: Highway 6 (freeway) and Route 444 (at grade)
- From the east: Route 443 (splits into a short freeway branch and an at-grade section)
- From the south: merged (concurrent) section of Highway 1 and Highway 6 (freeways)

The interchange is a complex of six distinct smaller interchanges, containing three Y interchanges, two diamond interchanges and one Parclo.
