= Ramallah and al-Bireh Governorate =

Governorate of Palestine

Coordinates: 31.933°N 35.205°E

- Governorate
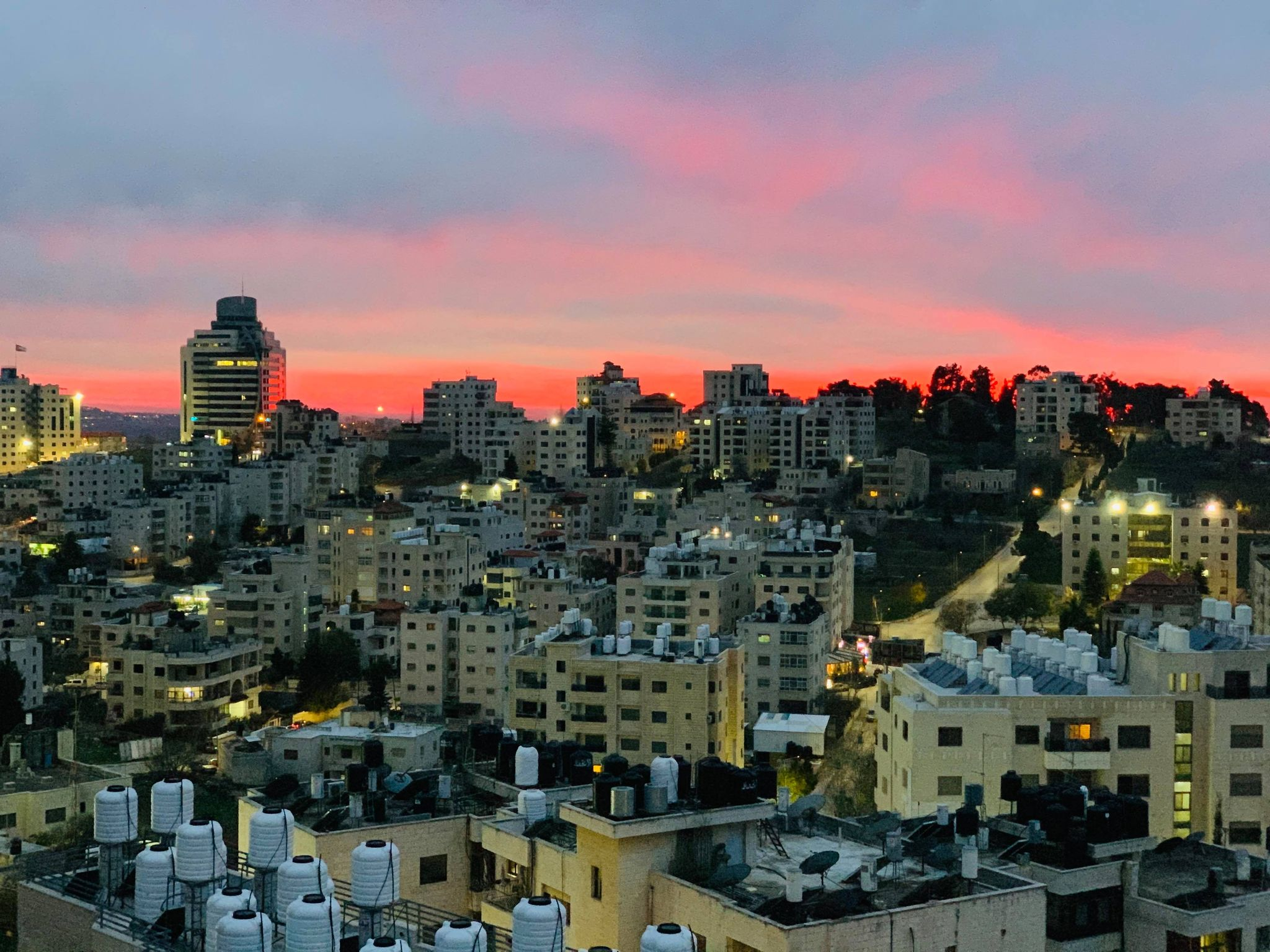

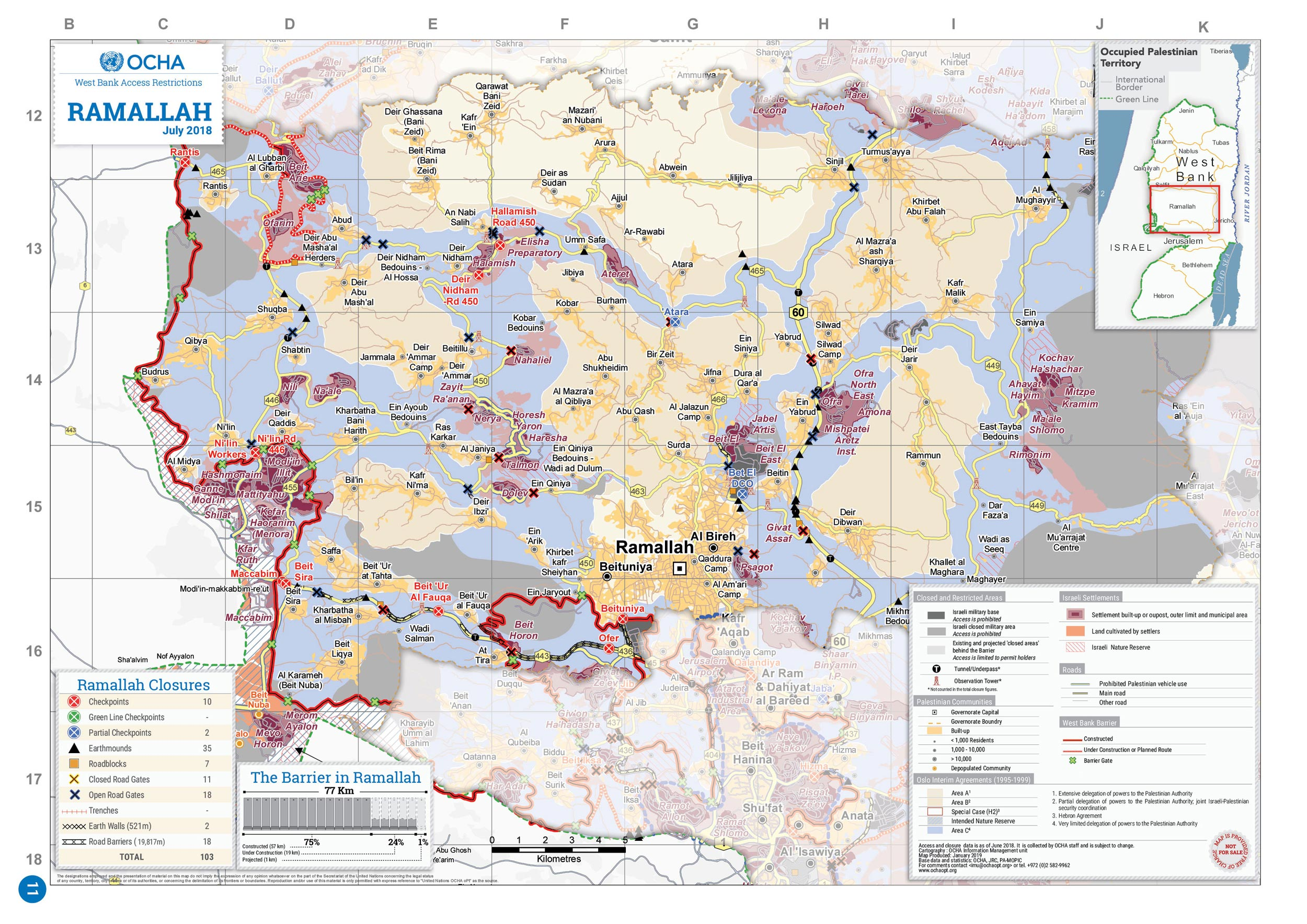
- 2018 United Nations map of the area, showing the West Bank
- Interactive map of Ramallah and al-Bireh Governorate
- Country: Palestine

Area
  - Total: 844 km^{2} (326 sq mi)

Population (2017 Census)
  - Total: 328,861
- This figure excludes the Israeli West Bank Settlements
- ISO 3166 code: PS-RBH

The Ramallah and al-Bireh Governorate (Arabic: محافظة رام الله والبيرة, romanized: Muḥāfaẓat Rām Allāh wa l Bīra) is one of 16 governorates of Palestine. It covers a large part of the central West Bank, on the northern border of the Jerusalem Governorate. Its district capital or muhfaza (seat) is the city of al-Bireh.

According to the Palestinian Central Bureau of Statistics (PCBS), the district had a population of 279,730 in 2007. Laila Ghannam serves as governor, the first woman in this role.

== Localities ==
According to PCBS, the governorate has 78 localities, including refugee camps, in its jurisdiction. 13 localities have the status of municipality.

=== Cities ===
- Al-Bireh: 45,975
- Ramallah: 38,998
- Beitunia: 26,604
- Rawabi: 5,000

=== Municipalities ===
The following localities in the Ramallah and al-Bireh Governorate have populations over 5,000.

- Bani Zeid
- Bani Zeid al-Sharqiya
- Beit Liqya
- Bir Zeit
- Deir Ammar
- Deir Dibwan
- Deir Jarir
- al-Ittihad
- Kharbatha al-Misbah
- al-Mazra'a ash-Sharqiya
- Ni'lin
- Silwad
- Sinjil
- Turmus Ayya
- al-Zaitounah

=== Village councils ===
The following localities in the Ramallah and al-Bireh Governorate have populations of over 1,000.

- Aboud
- Abu Qash
- Abwein
- Ajjul
- 'Atara
- Beitin
- Bil'in
- Beit Sira
- Beit Ur al-Fauqa
- Beit Ur al-Tahta
- Beitillu
- Budrus
- Burqa
- Deir Ibzi
- Deir Abu Mash'al
- Deir Qaddis
- Deir as-Sudan
- Dura al-Qar
- Deir Debwan
- Ein 'Arik
- Ein Qiniya
- Ein Yabrud
- al-Janiya
- Jifna
- Kafr Ein
- Kafr Malik
- Kafr Nima
- Khirbet Abu Falah
- Kobar
- al-Lubban al-Gharbi
- al-Midya
- al-Mughayyir
- Nabi Salih
- Qarawat Bani Zeid
- Qibya
- Rammun
- Rantis
- Ras Karkar
- Saffa
- Shuqba
- Surda
- Taybeh
- At-Tira

=== Refugee camps ===
- Am'ari
- Qalandia
- Jalazone

== See also ==
- Governorates of Palestine
