= Beitillu =

- Municipality type C

Arabic transcription(s)
  - Arabic: بيت إللو
  - Latin: Beitillu (official)
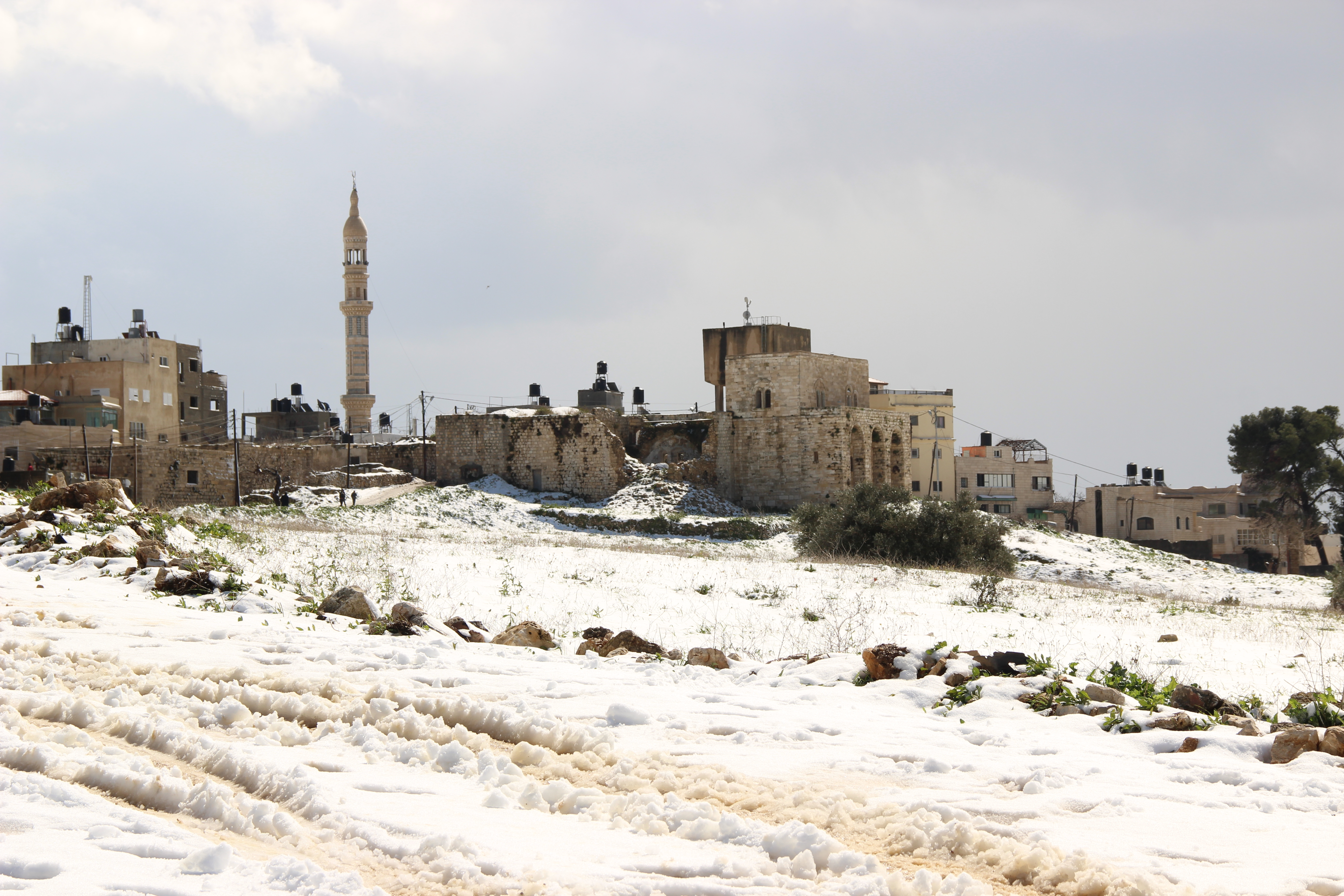
- Beitillu

- Location of Beitillu within Palestine
- Coordinates: 31°58′33″N 35°06′54″E
- Palestine grid: 161/153
- State: State of Palestine
- Governorate: Ramallah and al-Bireh

Government
  - Type: Municipality
- Elevation: 531 m (1,742 ft)

Population (2017)
  - Total: 3,465
- Name meaning: "The house of Ello"

Beitillu (Arabic: بيت إللو) is a Palestinian town located in the Ramallah and al-Bireh Governorate in the northern West Bank, 19 kilometers Northwest of Ramallah. According to the Palestinian Central Bureau of Statistics, it had a population of 3,465 in 2017.

Presently much of the villagers' traditional land, springs, gardens with olive and fig trees, near the Israeli settlement of Nachliel cannot be accessed, because their way is barred by Israeli soldiers or settlers, often with dogs.

Beitillu, together with Deir 'Ammar and Jammala, form the new town of Al-Ittihad.

== Location of Al-Ittihad ==
Al-Itihad is located 12.5 kilometers (7.8 mi) northwest of Ramallah. Al-Itihad is bordered by Kobar and Al-Zaytouneh to the east, Deir Abu Mash'al, Deir Nidham and 'Abud to the north, Shabtin and Deir Qaddis to the west, and Ras Karkar, Kharbatha Bani Harith, Al-Zaytouneh and Al Janiya to the south.

== History ==
Sherds from Iron Age II/ Persian, Hellenistic, Roman, Byzantine, Umayyad, Crusader, Ayyubid and Mamluk era have been found at Beitillu. Finkelstein and Lederman mention remains of ancient structures, most of them in the village's east, and note that the Mandatory DOA documented ancient quarries here.

Abel, Klein and Safrai all identified Beitillu with Ayyalon, a place mentioned in Midrash Vayisau. Yoel Elitzur asserts that the name Beitillu may be derived from "Bethel", the name of several Israelite settlements of the Iron Age, including the well-known Bethel in Benjamin and another one listed in Judah. He proposed that Beitillu might be the site of Bethel in Mount Ephraim, which the Book of Judges (4:5) mentions as being close to the Palm of Deborah.

Prawer and Benvenisti associated Beitillu with a medieval site bearing the same name, which, according to Mayer, belonged to the monastery of Mons Gaudii (Nebi Samwil).

=== Ottoman era ===
Beitillu appeared in the 1596 Ottoman tax registers as Bayt Illu, in the Nahiya of Quds of the Liwa of Quds. It had a population of 30 households, all Muslim. They paid a fixed tax-rate of 33.3% on agricultural products, including wheat, barley, olive trees, vineyards and fruit trees, goats and beehives, in addition to occasional revenues; a total of 14,500 Akçe.

In 1838 Beit Ello was noted as Muslim village in the Beni Harith district, north of Jerusalem.

French explorer Victor Guérin visited Beit-Illou in 1870, and he estimated that the village had about 800 inhabitants. He also noted that it had "magnificent trees" to the north. Guérin´s population estimate fits well with an official Ottoman village list from about 1870, which showed that Beit Oula had 100 houses and a population of 430, although it only counted the men.

In 1882, the PEF's Survey of Western Palestine described Beit Ello as a "village of moderate size on high ground, among olives, with a well to the south-east, and a spring and a tank on the north-east".

In 1896 the population of Bet Illo was estimated to be about 588 persons.

=== British Mandate era ===
In the 1922 census of Palestine, conducted by the British Mandate authorities, Baitilla had a population of 252 Muslims, increasing in the 1931 census to a population of 440, still all Muslim, in 98 houses.

In the 1945 statistics the population of Beitillu was 490 Muslims, with 13,409 dunams of land, according to an official land and population survey. 5,825 dunams were used for plantations and irrigable land, 1,681 dunams for cereals, while 58 dunams were built-up (urban) land.

=== Jordanian era ===
After the 1948 Arab-Israeli War, Beitillu was under Jordanian rule from 1948 until 1967.

In 1961, the population was 1,535 persons.

=== post-1967 ===
Beitillu came under Israeli occupation after the 1967 Six-Day War. The population in the 1967 census conducted by the Israeli authorities was 848, of whom 174 originated from the Israeli territory.

After the 1995 accords, 41.2% of Al-Ittihad‘s land was classified as Area B and the remaining 58.8% as Area C. Israel has confiscated 858 dunams of land from Al-Ittihad for the construction of 4 Israeli settlements: Nahl'iel, Na'aleh, Talmon and Hallamish.

Much of the villagers' traditional land, springs, gardens with olive and fig trees, near the Israeli settlement of Nachliel cannot be accessed, according to Amira Hass, because their way is barred by soldiers or settlers, often with dogs:-

This has been going on for years. Gradually, ever-expanding rings of grazing land and rows of groves have become inaccessible to residents of the Beitillu and Deir Ammar villages.'

One villager complained:

“I have 200 olive trees, 500 fig trees and 300 vines there. I can’t even pick a single fig,” stated a Palestinian farmer who looks older than his age; he spoke without cynicism, and with much pain. “They aren’t killing me, but they are killing my heart.”

In February 2011, three Beitillu houses were vandalised by anonymous graffiti artists who painted slogans like 'Muhammad is a pig' on their walls, probably as a price tag policy retaliation for the forced evacuation of a settler outpost near Kiryat Arba.

== Bibliography ==
- Barron, J.B., ed. (1923). Palestine: Report and General Abstracts of the Census of 1922. Government of Palestine.
- Conder, C.R.; Kitchener, H.H. (1882). The Survey of Western Palestine: Memoirs of the Topography, Orography, Hydrography, and Archaeology. Vol. 2. London: Committee of the Palestine Exploration Fund.
- Finkelstein, I.; Lederman, Zvi, eds. (1997). Highlands of many cultures. Tel Aviv: Institute of Archaeology of Tel Aviv University Publications Section. ISBN 965-440-007-3.
- Government of Jordan, Department of Statistics (1964). First Census of Population and Housing. Volume I: Final Tables; General Characteristics of the Population (PDF).
- Government of Palestine, Department of Statistics (1945). Village Statistics, April, 1945.
- Guérin, V. (1875). Description Géographique Historique et Archéologique de la Palestine (in French). Vol. 2: Samarie, pt. 2. Paris: L'Imprimerie Nationale.
- Hadawi, S. (1970). Village Statistics of 1945: A Classification of Land and Area ownership in Palestine. Palestine Liberation Organization Research Centre.
- Hartmann, M. (1883). "Die Ortschaftenliste des Liwa Jerusalem in dem türkischen Staatskalender für Syrien auf das Jahr 1288 der Flucht (1871)". Zeitschrift des Deutschen Palästina-Vereins. 6: 102–149.
- Hütteroth, W.-D.; Abdulfattah, K. (1977). Historical Geography of Palestine, Transjordan and Southern Syria in the Late 16th Century. Erlanger Geographische Arbeiten, Sonderband 5. Erlangen, Germany: Vorstand der Fränkischen Geographischen Gesellschaft. ISBN 3-920405-41-2.
- Mills, E., ed. (1932). Census of Palestine 1931. Population of Villages, Towns and Administrative Areas. Jerusalem: Government of Palestine.
- Palmer, E.H. (1881). The Survey of Western Palestine: Arabic and English Name Lists Collected During the Survey by Lieutenants Conder and Kitchener, R. E. Transliterated and Explained by E.H. Palmer. Committee of the Palestine Exploration Fund.
- Robinson, E.; Smith, E. (1841). Biblical Researches in Palestine, Mount Sinai and Arabia Petraea: A Journal of Travels in the year 1838. Vol. 3. Boston: Crocker & Brewster.
- Schick, C. (1896). "Zur Einwohnerzahl des Bezirks Jerusalem". Zeitschrift des Deutschen Palästina-Vereins. 19: 120–127.
- Socin, A. (1879). "Alphabetisches Verzeichniss von Ortschaften des Paschalik Jerusalem". Zeitschrift des Deutschen Palästina-Vereins. 2: 135–163.
