= Deir 'Ammar =

- Municipality type D (Village council)

Arabic transcription(s)
  - Arabic: دير عمار
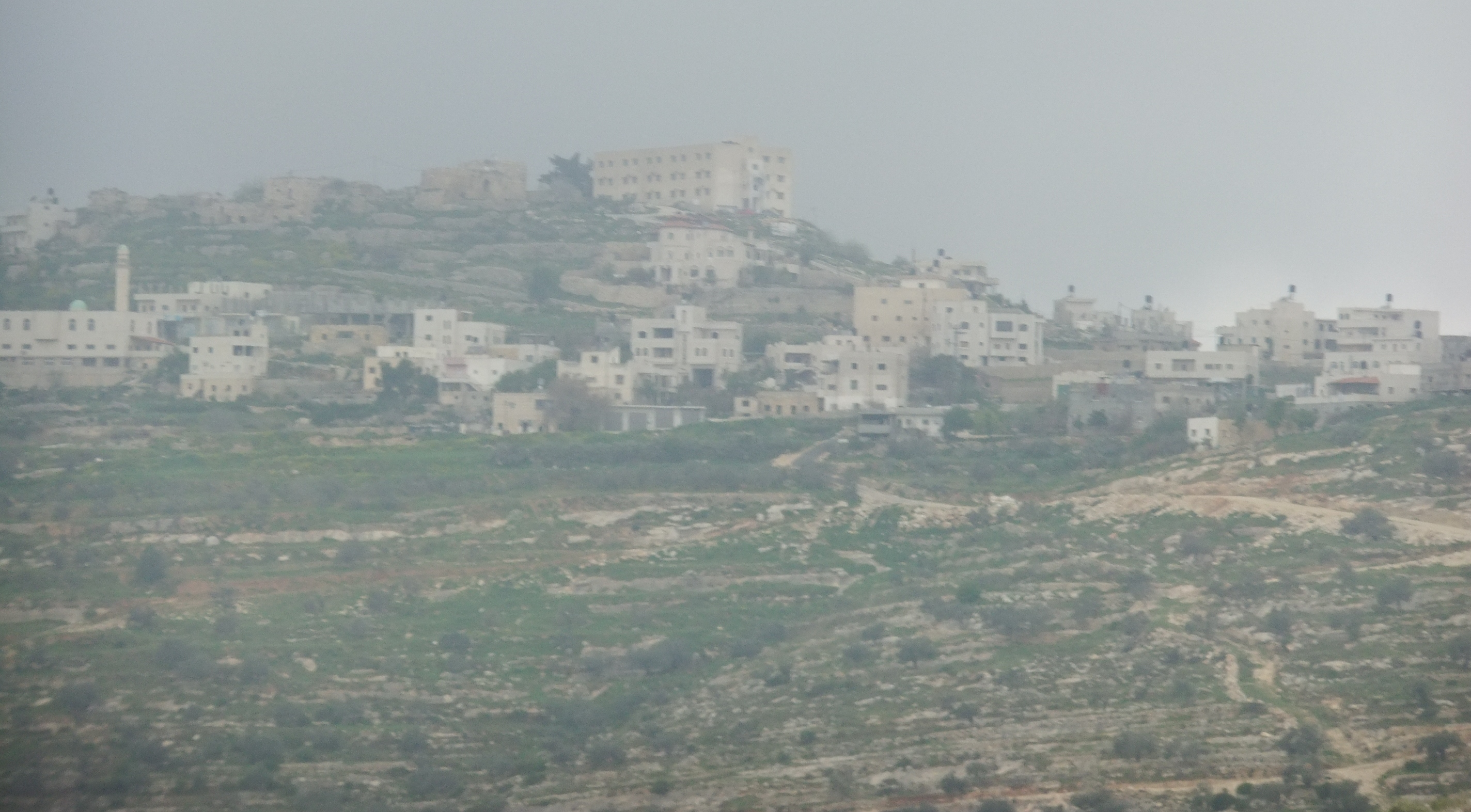
- Deir 'Ammar

- Location of Deir 'Ammar within Palestine
- Coordinates: 31°58′9″N 35°06′29″E
- Palestine grid: 159/152
- State: State of Palestine
- Governorate: Ramallah and al-Bireh

Government
  - Type: Village council
- Elevation: 531 m (1,742 ft)

Population (2017)
  - Total: 3,353
- Name meaning: The monastery of the builder

Deir 'Ammar (Arabic: دير عمار, romanized: Dayr ʿAmmār) is a Palestinian town in the Ramallah and al-Bireh Governorate, located 17 km (11 mi) northwest of Ramallah in the northern West Bank. According to the Palestinian Central Bureau of Statistics (PCBS), the town had a population of 3,353 inhabitants in 2017.

Deir 'Ammar, together with Beitillu and Jammala, form the new town of Al-Ittihad.

== Etymology ==
The name is of Arabic origin, meaning "The Monastery of 'Ammar (p.n.)."

== Location of Al-Ittihad ==
Al-Itihad is located 12.5 kilometers (7.8 mi) northwest of Ramallah. Al-Itihad is bordered by Kobar and Al-Zaytouneh to the east, Deir Abu Mash'al, Deir Nidham and 'Abud to the north, Shabtin and Deir Qaddis to the west, and Ras Karkar, Kharbatha Bani Harith, Al-Zaytouneh and Al Janiya to the south.

== History ==
Potsherds from the Middle Bronze Age, Iron Age I, Iron Age II, Hellenistic, Roman and Mamluk eras have been found at Deir 'Ammar. Two Iron Age olive presses were also found here.

Just southwest of the village is the archeological site of Khirbet e-Shune, a large ruin from the Iron Age, Hellenistic and Early Roman periods that may be identified with the ancient town of Ramathaim, which was a capital of a toparchy under the Hasmonean kingdom.

=== Ottoman era ===
Dayr Ammar was incorporated into the Ottoman Empire in 1517 with all of Palestine, and in 1596 it appeared in the tax registers as being in the nahiya of Al-Quds in the liwa of Al-Quds. It had a population of 33 household, who were all Muslims. They paid a fixed tax-rate of 33.3% on agricultural products, including wheat, barley, olive trees, vineyards/fruit trees, goats and beehives, in addition to occasional revenues; a total of 10,400 akçe. All of the revenue went to a Waqf. Potsherds from the early Ottoman era have also been found here.

In 1838 Deir Ammar was noted as Muslim village in the Beni Harith district, north of Jerusalem.

In May, 1870, Victor Guérin found the village to be of equal importance to Jammala, and that there was a stream between the two villages where the women went for water when their own cisterns went dry. An official Ottoman village list from about the same year, 1870, showed that Der Ammar had 35 houses and a population of 226, though the population count included only men.

In 1882, the PEF's Survey of Western Palestine described 'Deir Ammar as: "a village of medium size on a hill, with a well about 1/2 mile to the west."

In 1896 the population of Der Ammar was estimated to be about 357 persons.

=== British Mandate era ===
In the 1922 census of Palestine conducted by the British Mandate authorities, Dair 'Ammar had a population of 265 Muslims, increasing in the 1931 census to 316 Muslims in 81 houses.

In the 1945 statistics the population was 350 Muslims, while the total land area was 7,189 dunams, according to an official land and population survey. Of this, 2,242 were allocated for plantations and irrigable land, 1,615 for cereals, while 15 dunams were classified as built-up areas.

=== Jordanian era ===
In the wake of the 1948 Arab–Israeli War, and after the 1949 Armistice Agreements, Deir 'Ammar came under Jordanian rule. It was annexed by Jordan in 1950.

The Jordanian census of 1961 found 2,243 inhabitants in Deir 'Ammar.

=== 1967-present ===
After the Six-Day War in 1967, Deir 'Ammar came under Israeli occupation.

After the 1995 accords, 41.2% of Al-Ittihad land was classified as Area B, while the remaining 58.8% was classified as Area C. Israel has confiscated 858 dunams of land from Al-Ittihad for the construction of 4 Israeli settlements: Nahl'iel, Na'aleh, Talmon and Hallamish.

== Bibliography ==
- Barron, J.B., ed. (1923). Palestine: Report and General Abstracts of the Census of 1922. Government of Palestine.
- Conder, C.R.; Kitchener, H.H. (1882). The Survey of Western Palestine: Memoirs of the Topography, Orography, Hydrography, and Archaeology. Vol. 2. London: Committee of the Palestine Exploration Fund.
- Finkelstein, I.; Lederman, Zvi, eds. (1997). Highlands of many cultures. Tel Aviv: Institute of Archaeology of Tel Aviv University Publications Section. ISBN 965-440-007-3.
- Government of Jordan, Department of Statistics (1964). First Census of Population and Housing. Volume I: Final Tables; General Characteristics of the Population (PDF).
- Government of Palestine, Department of Statistics (1945). Village Statistics, April, 1945.
- Guérin, V. (1875). Description Géographique Historique et Archéologique de la Palestine (in French). Vol. 2: Samarie, pt. 2. Paris: L'Imprimerie Nationale.
- Hadawi, S. (1970). Village Statistics of 1945: A Classification of Land and Area ownership in Palestine. Palestine Liberation Organization Research Center.
- Hartmann, M. (1883). "Die Ortschaftenliste des Liwa Jerusalem in dem türkischen Staatskalender für Syrien auf das Jahr 1288 der Flucht (1871)". Zeitschrift des Deutschen Palästina-Vereins. 6: 102–149.
- Hütteroth, W.-D.; Abdulfattah, K. (1977). Historical Geography of Palestine, Transjordan and Southern Syria in the Late 16th Century. Erlanger Geographische Arbeiten, Sonderband 5. Erlangen, Germany: Vorstand der Fränkischen Geographischen Gesellschaft. ISBN 3-920405-41-2.
- Mills, E., ed. (1932). Census of Palestine 1931. Population of Villages, Towns and Administrative Areas. Jerusalem: Government of Palestine.
- Palmer, E.H. (1881). The Survey of Western Palestine: Arabic and English Name Lists Collected During the Survey by Lieutenants Conder and Kitchener, R. E. Transliterated and Explained by E.H. Palmer. Committee of the Palestine Exploration Fund.
- Robinson, E.; Smith, E. (1841). Biblical Researches in Palestine, Mount Sinai and Arabia Petraea: A Journal of Travels in the year 1838. Vol. 3. Boston: Crocker & Brewster.
- Schick, C. (1896). "Zur Einwohnerzahl des Bezirks Jerusalem". Zeitschrift des Deutschen Palästina-Vereins. 19: 120–127.
- Socin, A. (1879). "Alphabetisches Verzeichniss von Ortschaften des Paschalik Jerusalem". Zeitschrift des Deutschen Palästina-Vereins. 2: 135–163.
