= Jammala =

- Municipality type C

Arabic transcription(s)
  - Arabic: جمّالا
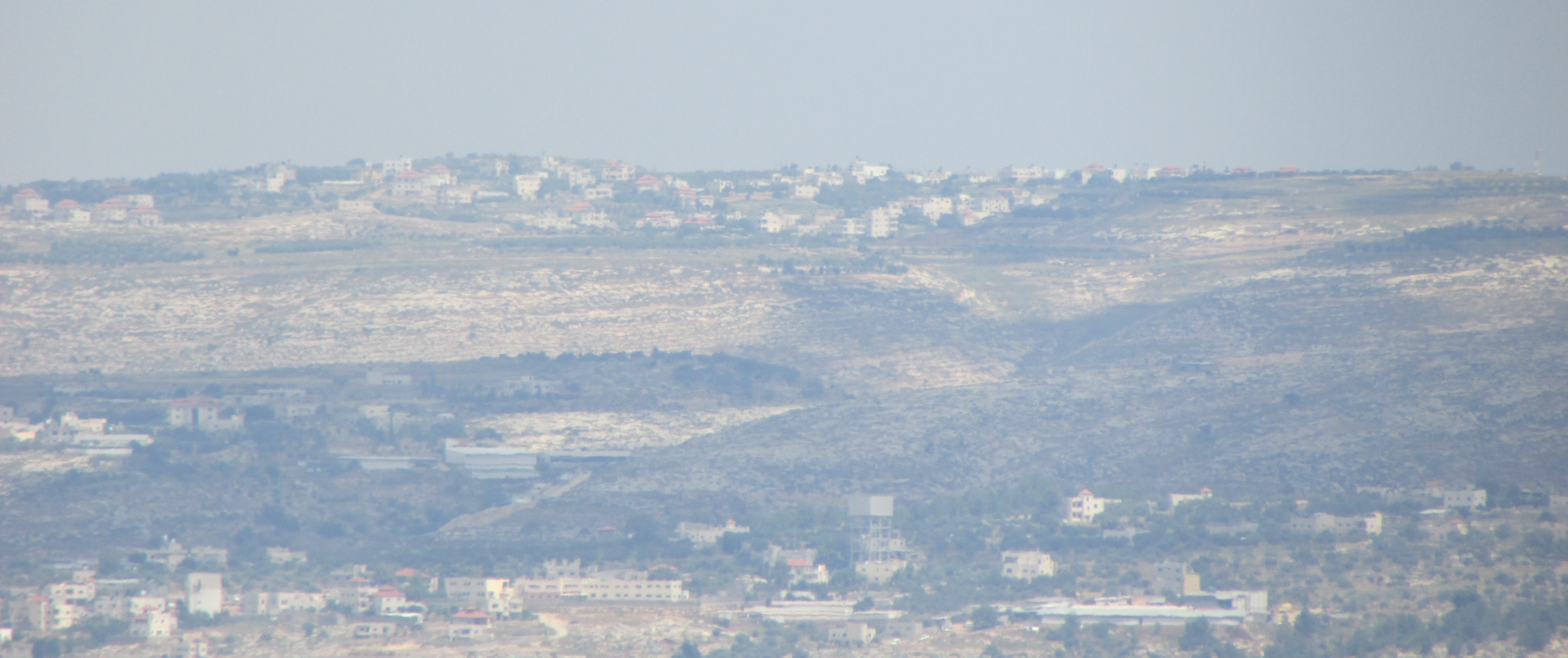
- Jammala behind, up on the hill. Bil'in and Kafr Ni'ma in the front.

- Location of Jammala within Palestine
- Coordinates: 31°58′29″N 35°05′30″E
- Palestine grid: 158/153
- State: State of Palestine
- Governorate: Ramallah and al-Bireh

Government
  - Type: Municipality
- Elevation: 531 m (1,742 ft)

Population (2017)
  - Total: 1,664
- Name meaning: Jemmala

Jammala (Arabic: جمّالا) is a Palestinian town in the Ramallah and al-Bireh Governorate, located 18 kilometers Northwest of Ramallah in the northern West Bank. According to the Palestinian Central Bureau of Statistics (PCBS), the town had a population of 1,664 inhabitants in 2017.

Jammala, together with Beitillu and Deir 'Ammar, form the new town of Al-Ittihad.

== Location of Al-Ittihad ==
Al-Itihad is located 12.5 kilometers (7.8 mi) northwest of Ramallah. Al-Itihad is bordered by Kobar and Al-Zaytouneh lands to the east, Deir Abu Mash'al, Deir Nidham and 'Abud lands to the north, Shabtin and Deir Qaddis to the west, and Ras Karkar, Kharbatha Bani Harith, Al-Zaytouneh and Al Janiya villages to the south.

== History ==
Potsherds from the Hellenistic, Roman and Byzantine eras have been found at Jammala. Jammala might be the same as Caphar Gamala, a place mentioned in the Luciani Epistola. The "Tomb of Gamiliel" was supposedly discovered here in 415 CE.

It has been suggested that this was Gemmail, mentioned in Frankish sources, but archeological evidence does not support this.

=== Ottoman era ===
Jammala was incorporated into the Ottoman Empire in 1517 with all of Palestine, and in 1596 it appeared in the tax registers as being in the nahiya of Al-Quds in the liwa of Al-Quds. It had a population of 22 household; who were all Muslims. They paid a fixed tax-rate of 33,3 % on agricultural products, including wheat, barley, olive trees, fruit trees, goats and beehives, in addition to occasional revenues; a total of 11,000 akçe. Potsherd from the early Ottoman era have also been found here.

In 1838 Jemmala was noted as Muslim village in the Beni Harith district, north of Jerusalem.

In May, 1870, Victor Guérin found the village, which he called Djemmala, to have 350 inhabitants. He further noted that some houses were constructed of stones, which by their size and regularity "spoke of ancient times". An Ottoman village list from about the same year, 1870, found that the village, called Dschemali, had a population of 246, in a total of 36 houses, though the population count included men, only.

In 1882, the PEF's Survey of Western Palestine described Jemmala as: "a very small village, with a little mosque on high ground."

In 1896 the population of Dschemali was estimated to be about 312 persons.

=== British Mandate era ===
In the 1922 census of Palestine conducted by the British Mandate authorities, Jammala had a population of 119 Muslims, increasing in the 1931 census to 164 Muslims, in 53 houses.

In the 1945 statistics the population of Jammala was 200 Muslims, while the total land area was 7,170 dunams, according to an official land and population survey. Of this, 1,946 were plantations and irrigable land, 1,032 for cereals, while 19 dunams were classified as built-up areas.

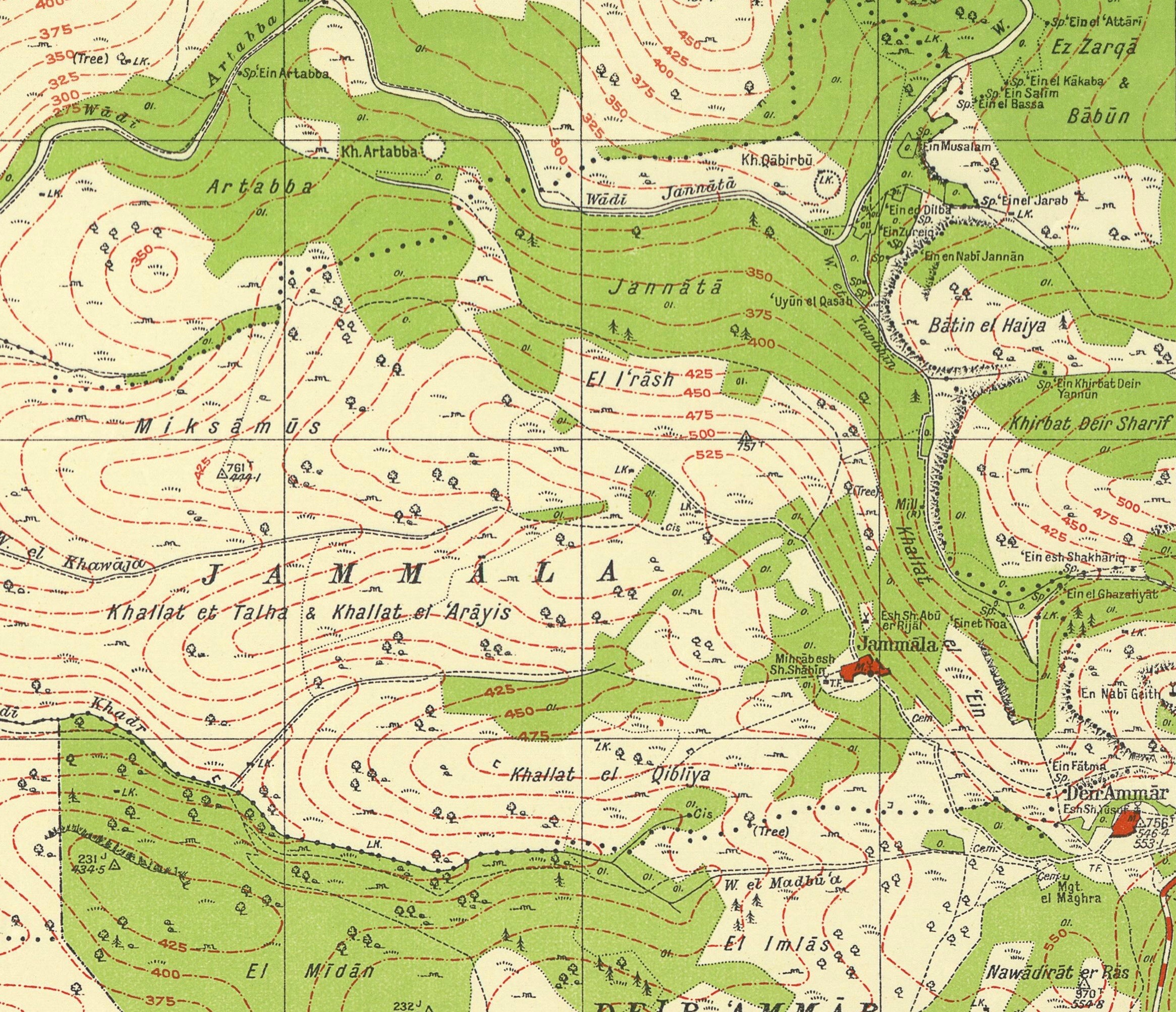
Jammala 1944 1:20,000

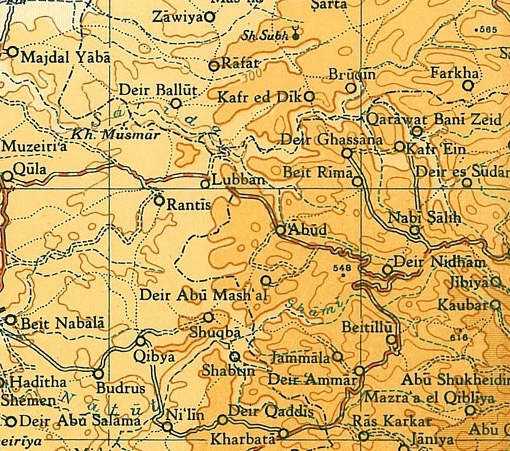
Jammala 1945 1:250,000

=== Jordanian era ===
In the wake of the 1948 Arab–Israeli War, and after the 1949 Armistice Agreements, Jammala came under Jordanian rule.

The Jordanian census of 1961 found 322 inhabitants in Jammala.

=== 1967-present ===
Since the Six-Day War in 1967, Jammala has been under Israeli occupation. The population in the 1967 census conducted by the Israeli authorities was 268, of whom 15 originated from the Israeli territory.

After the 1995 accords, 41.2% of Al-Ittihad land is defined as Area B land, while the remaining 58.8% is defined as Area C. Israel has confiscated 858 dunams of land from Al-Ittihad for the construction of 4 Israeli settlements: Nahl'iel, Na'aleh, Talmon and Hallamish.

== Bibliography ==
- Barron, J.B., ed. (1923). Palestine: Report and General Abstracts of the Census of 1922. Government of Palestine.
- Conder, C.R.; Kitchener, H.H. (1882). The Survey of Western Palestine: Memoirs of the Topography, Orography, Hydrography, and Archaeology. Vol. 2. London: Committee of the Palestine Exploration Fund.
- Dauphin, C. (1998). La Palestine byzantine, Peuplement et Populations. BAR International Series 726 (in French). Vol. III : Catalogue. Oxford: Archeopress. ISBN 0-860549-05-4.
- Finkelstein, I.; Lederman, Zvi, eds. (1997). Highlands of many cultures. Tel Aviv: Institute of Archaeology of Tel Aviv University Publications Section. ISBN 965-440-007-3.
- Government of Jordan, Department of Statistics (1964). First Census of Population and Housing. Volume I: Final Tables; General Characteristics of the Population (PDF).
- Government of Palestine, Department of Statistics (1945). Village Statistics, April, 1945.
- Guérin, V. (1875). Description Géographique Historique et Archéologique de la Palestine (in French). Vol. 2: Samarie, pt. 2. Paris: L'Imprimerie Nationale.
- Hadawi, S. (1970). Village Statistics of 1945: A Classification of Land and Area ownership in Palestine. Palestine Liberation Organization Research Center.
- Hartmann, M. (1883). "Die Ortschaftenliste des Liwa Jerusalem in dem türkischen Staatskalender für Syrien auf das Jahr 1288 der Flucht (1871)". Zeitschrift des Deutschen Palästina-Vereins. 6: 102–149.
- Hütteroth, W.-D.; Abdulfattah, K. (1977). Historical Geography of Palestine, Transjordan and Southern Syria in the Late 16th Century. Erlanger Geographische Arbeiten, Sonderband 5. Erlangen, Germany: Vorstand der Fränkischen Geographischen Gesellschaft. ISBN 3-920405-41-2.
- Mills, E., ed. (1932). Census of Palestine 1931. Population of Villages, Towns and Administrative Areas. Jerusalem: Government of Palestine.
- Palmer, E.H. (1881). The Survey of Western Palestine: Arabic and English Name Lists Collected During the Survey by Lieutenants Conder and Kitchener, R. E. Transliterated and Explained by E.H. Palmer. Committee of the Palestine Exploration Fund.
- Robinson, E.; Smith, E. (1841). Biblical Researches in Palestine, Mount Sinai and Arabia Petraea: A Journal of Travels in the year 1838. Vol. 3. Boston: Crocker & Brewster.
- Röhricht, R. (1887). "Studien zur mittelalterlichen Geographie und Topographie Syriens". Zeitschrift des Deutschen Palästina-Vereins. 10: 195–344.
- Schick, C. (1896). "Zur Einwohnerzahl des Bezirks Jerusalem". Zeitschrift des Deutschen Palästina-Vereins. 19: 120–127.
- Socin, A. (1879). "Alphabetisches Verzeichniss von Ortschaften des Paschalik Jerusalem". Zeitschrift des Deutschen Palästina-Vereins. 2: 135–163.
