= Shuqba =

Palestinian town in Ramallah and al-Bireh, State of Palestine

- Municipality type D (Village council)

Arabic transcription(s)
  - Arabic: شقبه
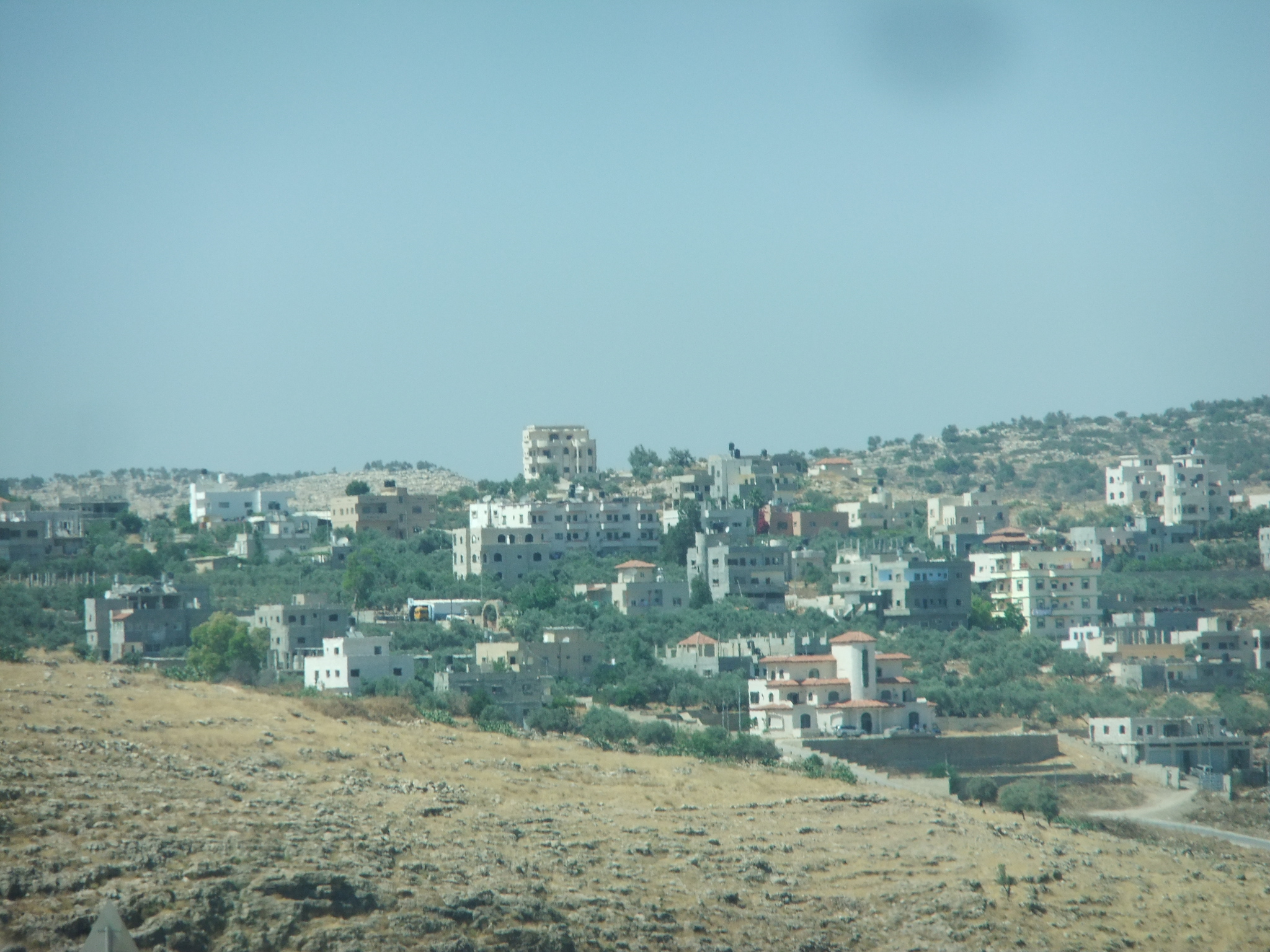
- Roadside view of Shuqba, 2012

- Location of Shuqba within Palestine
- Coordinates: 31°59′13″N 35°2′18″E
- Palestine grid: 153/154
- State: State of Palestine
- Governorate: Ramallah and al-Bireh

Government
  - Type: Village council

Area
  - Total: 13.4 km^{2} (5.2 sq mi)

Population (2017)
  - Total: 5,459
  - Density: 407/km^{2} (1,060/sq mi)
- Name meaning: The crevasse, cleft, or narrow pass.

Shuqba (Arabic: شقبة) is a Palestinian town in the Ramallah and al-Bireh Governorate, located 17 kilometers northwest of the city of Ramallah in Palestine.

Shuqba has a total area of 13,990 dunams (1,399 ha; 3,460 acres), and the built-up area comprises 616 dunams (61.6 ha; 152 acres). Shuqba was home to 5,459 inhabitants in 2017.

== Location ==
Shuqba is located 17,9 km northwest of Ramallah. It bordered by Deir abu Mash'al and Al-Itihad to the east, and Ni'lin, Qibya and Shabtin to the south.

To the west is the Green line, and to the north is 'Abud, Rantis, and Israeli settlement of Ofarim.

== History ==
Dorothy Garrod studied the transition of Mesolithic to Neolithic culture represented in the Shuqba Cave on the northern bank of Wadi an-Natuf near Shuqba in 1928. The name "Natufian Culture" was then coined to describe the inhabitants of the southern Levant at this crucial juncture in human history.

Sherds from Iron Age I-II, Iron Age II, Persian, Hellenistic, Roman Empire, Byzantine and Mamluk eras have been found.

=== Ottoman era ===
Sherds from the early Ottoman era have been found here. In 1596 Shuqba was a part of the nahiya ("subdistrict") of Ramla, which was under the administration Gaza Sanjak. In the tax records that year it had a population of 49 household who were all Muslims. They paid a fixed tax-rate of 25% on agricultural products, including wheat, barley, summer crops, olive trees, goats and beehives, in addition to occasional revenues and a press for olives or grape syrup; a total of 2,600 akçe.

In 1870, Victor Guérin noted that the houses of Kharbet Choukba were very roughly built; and that the village contained about two hundred inhabitants. Under the name Schakba, an Ottoman village list of about the same year, 1870, found 39 houses and a population of 141, though the population count included only men. It was noted that it was located north of Deir Qaddis, and having Bayt Nabala to the west.

In 1882, the PEF's Survey of Western Palestine (SWP) described it as "A small village on high ground, surrounded with trees."

=== British Mandate era ===
In the 1922 census of Palestine, conducted by the British Mandate authorities, Shuqba had a population of 530 Muslims, increasing in the 1931 census to 696, still all Muslims, in a total of 130 houses.

In the 1945 statistics, the population was 840, all Muslims, while the total land area was 15,013 dunams, according to an official land and population survey. Of this, 1,496 were allocated for plantations and irrigable land, 5,053 for cereals, while 16 dunams were classified as built-up (urban) areas.

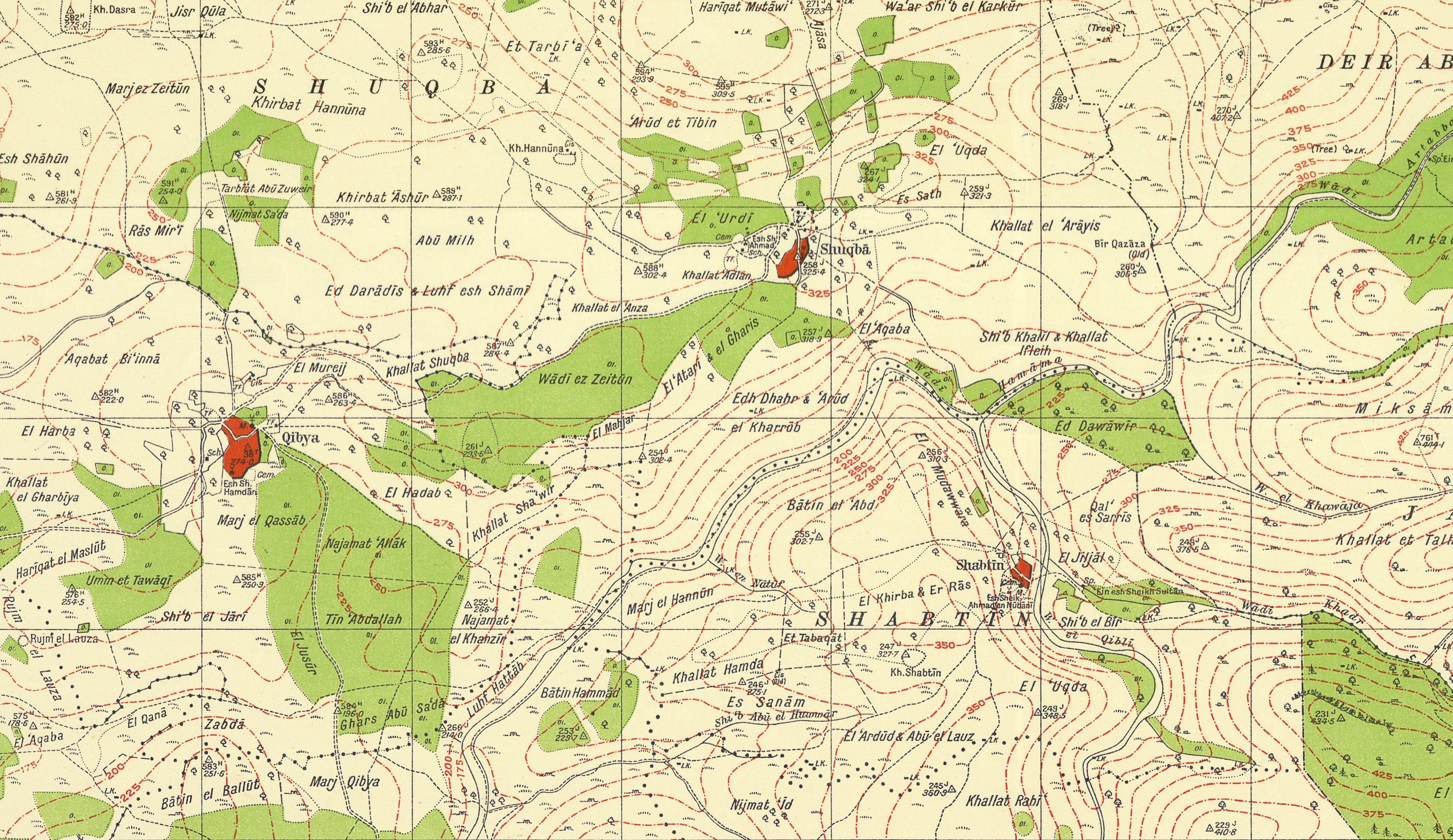
Shuqba 1944 1:20,000

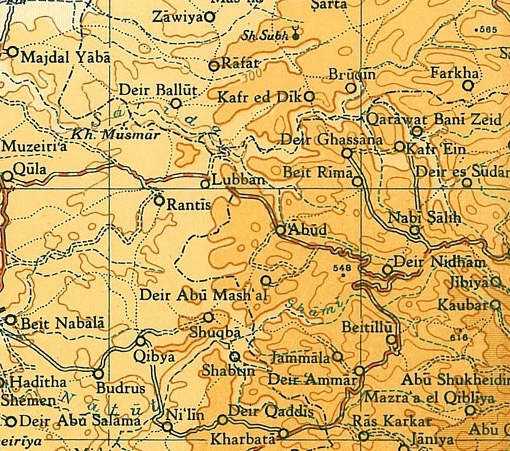
Shuqba 1945 1:250,000

=== Jordanian era ===
In the wake of the 1948 Arab–Israeli War, and after the 1949 Armistice Agreements, Shuqba came under Jordanian rule. It was annexed by Jordan in 1950.

In 1961, the population of Shuqba was 1,241 persons.

=== Post-1967 ===
Since the Six-Day War in 1967, Shuqba has been under Israeli occupation. The population in the 1967 census conducted by the Israeli authorities was 885, of whom 54 originated from the Israeli territory.

After the 1995 accords, 8.4% of Shuqba’s land was classified as Area B, and the remaining 91.6% as Area C. The Israeli West Bank barrier is partly built on village land, isolating 1,352 dunums (10%) of the village on the west side of the wall. Israel has also confiscated village land for bypass roads, military checkpoints, and for the construction of an Israeli stone crusher. The extracted stone material is transferred to Israel, in breach of international law.

== Bibliography ==
- Barron, J.B., ed. (1923). Palestine: Report and General Abstracts of the Census of 1922. Government of Palestine.
- Conder, C.R.; Kitchener, H.H. (1882). The Survey of Western Palestine: Memoirs of the Topography, Orography, Hydrography, and Archaeology. Vol. 2. London: Committee of the Palestine Exploration Fund.
- Finkelstein, I.; Lederman, Zvi, eds. (1997). Highlands of many cultures. Vol. 1. Tel Aviv: Institute of Archaeology of Tel Aviv University Publications Section. ISBN 965-440-007-3.
- Government of Jordan, Department of Statistics (1964). First Census of Population and Housing. Volume I: Final Tables; General Characteristics of the Population (PDF).
- Government of Palestine, Department of Statistics (1945). Village Statistics, April, 1945.
- Guérin, V. (1875). Description Géographique Historique et Archéologique de la Palestine (in French). Vol. 2: Samarie, pt. 2. Paris: L'Imprimerie Nationale.
- Hadawi, S. (1970). Village Statistics of 1945: A Classification of Land and Area ownership in Palestine. Palestine Liberation Organization Research Center.
- Hartmann, M. (1883). "Die Ortschaftenliste des Liwa Jerusalem in dem türkischen Staatskalender für Syrien auf das Jahr 1288 der Flucht (1871)". Zeitschrift des Deutschen Palästina-Vereins. 6: 102–149.
- Hütteroth, W.-D.; Abdulfattah, K. (1977). Historical Geography of Palestine, Transjordan and Southern Syria in the Late 16th Century. Erlanger Geographische Arbeiten, Sonderband 5. Erlangen, Germany: Vorstand der Fränkischen Geographischen Gesellschaft. ISBN 3-920405-41-2.
- Mills, E., ed. (1932). Census of Palestine 1931. Population of Villages, Towns and Administrative Areas. Jerusalem: Government of Palestine.
- Palmer, E.H. (1881). The Survey of Western Palestine: Arabic and English Name Lists Collected During the Survey by Lieutenants Conder and Kitchener, R. E. Transliterated and Explained by E.H. Palmer. Committee of the Palestine Exploration Fund.
- Socin, A. (1879). "Alphabetisches Verzeichniss von Ortschaften des Paschalik Jerusalem". Zeitschrift des Deutschen Palästina-Vereins. 2: 135–163.
