= Al-Ittihad, Ramallah =

Al-Ittihad
- Municipality type C

Arabic transcription(s)
  - Arabic: الاتحاد
- Location of Al-Ittihad within Palestine
- Coordinates: 31°58′24″N 35°06′13″E
- State: State of Palestine
- Governorate: Ramallah and al-Bireh
- Founded: 1997

Government
  - Type: Municipality
  - Head of Municipality: Faisal Bazzar

Population (2007)
  - Total: 6,803
- Website: www.ittihad-mun.org

Al-Ittihad (Arabic: الاتحاد meaning "the Union") is a Palestinian town in the Ramallah and al-Bireh Governorate of the State of Palestine, created in 1997 as a merger of three towns Beitillu, Deir 'Ammar and Jammala. According to the Palestinian Central Bureau of Statistics, it had a population of approximately 6,803 in 2007.

== Location of Al-Ittihad ==
Al-Itihad is located 12.5 kilometers (7.8 mi) northwest of Ramallah. Al-Itihad is bordered by Kobar and Al-Zaytouneh to the east, Deir Abu Mash'al, Deir Nidham and 'Abud to the north, Shabtin and Deir Qaddis to the west, and Ras Karkar, Kharbatha Bani Harith, Al-Zaytouneh and Al Janiya to the south.

== Beitillu ==
Beitillu (Arabic: بيتللو) is a Palestinian town located in the Ramallah and al-Bireh Governorate in the northern West Bank, 19 kilometers Northwest of Ramallah. According to the Palestinian Central Bureau of Statistics, it had a population of approximately 3,083 in mid-year 2006

== Deir 'Ammar ==
Deir 'Ammar (Arabic: دير عمار) is a Palestinian town in the Ramallah and al-Bireh Governorate, located 17 kilometers Northwest of Ramallah in the northern West Bank. According to the Palestinian Central Bureau of Statistics (PCBS), the town had a population of 2,414 inhabitants in mid-year 2006.

== Jammala ==
Jammala (Arabic: جمّالا) is a Palestinian town in the Ramallah and al-Bireh Governorate, located 18 kilometers Northwest of Ramallah in the northern West Bank. According to the Palestinian Central Bureau of Statistics (PCBS), the town had a population of 1,453 inhabitants in mid-year 2006.

== Post-1967 ==
After the 1995 accords, 41.2% of Al-Ittihad's land was classified as Area B and the remaining 58.8% as Area C. Israel has confiscated 858 dunams of land from Al-Ittihad for the construction of 4 Israeli settlements: Nahliel, Na'ale, Talmon and Halamish.
