= Dajani =

Dajani or al-Dajani is a Middle Eastern surname. Notable people with this name include:

- Abdelrahman al-Dajani, 19th-century mayor of Jerusalem
- Burhan Dajani (1921–2000), Palestinian academic
- Dana Dajani, Palestinian actress and writer
- Daniel Dajani (1906–1946), Albanian martyr
- Geeby Dajani, American music producer with Stimulated Dummies
- Jamal Dajani (born 1957), Palestinian-American journalist and television producer
- Karma Dajani, Lebanese-Dutch mathematician
- Kobi Dajani (born 1984), Israeli footballer
- Nadia Dajani (born 1965), American actress of Irish and Palestinian ancestry
- Nijmeddin Dajani, Jordanian economist and ambassador
- Omar Dajani (born 1970), Palestinian-American legal scholar
- Rana Dajani, Jordanian molecular biologist
