= Omar Dajani =

Omar Dajani is a Palestinian-American professor and former member of the Palestine Liberation Organization's (PLO) Negotiations Support Unit.

Dajani was born in Texas in 1970. He received his B.A. from Northwestern University in Illinois and his J.D. from Yale Law School.

In 1999, he left the United States to join the PLO's Negotiations Support Unit, where he worked as a senior legal advisor to the Palestinian Authority negotiating team. In 2001, Dajani left his post at the PLO to take a position as a political advisor to United Nations Special Envoy Terje Rød-Larsen, which he held until 2003.

Dajani is currently a professor of law at the University of the Pacific's McGeorge School of Law in Sacramento, California.

Dajani served as the co-chair of the Israeli-Palestinian political initiative A Land for All.

== See also ==
- Rana Dajani
