= Deir Abu Mash'al =

- Municipality type C

Arabic transcription(s)
  - Arabic: دير ابو مشعل
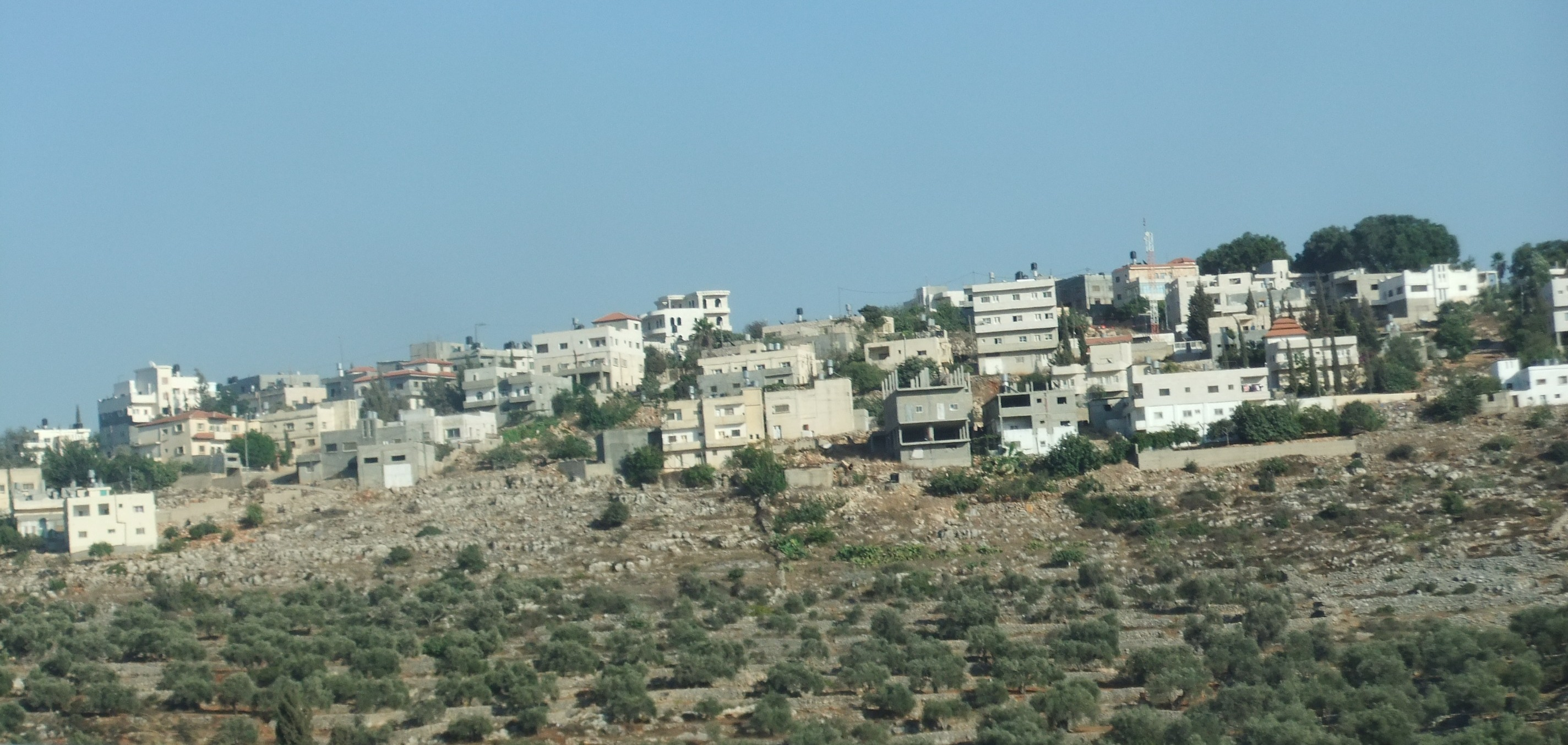
- Deir Abu Mash'al

- Location of Deir Abu Mash'al within Palestine
- Coordinates: 31°59′54″N 35°04′06″E
- Palestine grid: 156/156
- State: State of Palestine
- Governorate: Ramallah and al-Bireh

Government
  - Type: Municipality
  - Head of Municipality: Ibrahim Mohammad Yousi Zhran

Population (2017)
  - Total: 4,233
- Name meaning: The monastery with the cresset (a beacon)

Deir Abu Mash'al (Arabic: دير ابو مشعل) is a Palestinian village in the Ramallah and al-Bireh Governorate of the State of Palestine, located 24 kilometers (15 mi) west of Ramallah in the northern West Bank. According to the Palestinian Central Bureau of Statistics (PCBS), the village had a population of 4,233 inhabitants in 2017.

== Location ==
Deir Abu Mash'al is located 16.4 kilometers (10.2 mi) northwest of Ramallah. It is bordered by Al-Itihad to the south and east, Abud to the east and north, and Shuqba to the west.

== History ==
Sherds from the Byzantine, Byzantine/Umayyad and Crusader/Ayyubid eras have been found here.

There is a wall at the highest part of the village, with cisterns below it, which is assumed to be the remains of the 12th century Crusader castle named Bellifortis. It possibly belonged to the Hospitalliers in 1167.

The PEF's Survey of Western Palestine (SWP) visited the place (in 1873), and noted: "There are here indications of an important fort, apparently of Crusading times. A rock platform, roughly square, about 50 yards wide, occupies the top of the hill, and many well-cut stones, with rustic boss and a draft 3 inches wide, lie round. On the west is a wall of rubble faced with small ashlar, which stands over a rock scarp. On the north are traces of a similar wall. There is a small tank, well cemented, with a groined roof. There is also a large well near. A rock-cut drain some 6 inches wide leads towards the well. On the south are rock-cut steps. On the east, quarries and two tanks, rock-cut, but roofed in with masonry. One measured 20 feet by 12 feet." Modern opinion is that the remains are from a major Byzantine monastery, which had a Crusader tower added to it.

Sherds from the Mamluk era have also been found here.

Approximately one kilometer southeast of the village lies the large ruin called Khirbet Artabba, situated atop a hill. Uncovered by village residents, the site includes remnants including fortifications, architectural features, ritual baths, storage pits, and the entrances to five large cisterns. Archaeologist Dvir Raviv, drawing comparisons with other forts from the Second Temple Period and considering potsherds dating back to the Hellenistic and Early Roman periods, proposed that the site was constructed by Simon Thassi, the final leader of the Maccabean revolt. The site seems to have been deserted in the later days of Herod.

=== Ottoman era ===
In 1517, the village was included in the Ottoman Empire with the rest of Palestine and in the 1596 tax-records it was in the Nahiya of Jabal Quds of the Liwa of Al-Quds. The population was 42 households, all Muslim. They paid a tax rate of 33.3% on agricultural products, which included wheat, barley, olive trees, fruit trees, goats and beehives, in addition to "occasional revenues"; a total of 3,300 akçe. Sherds from the early Ottoman era have also been found here.

According to Roy Marom, in the 18th or early 19th centuries, residents of Deir Abu Mash'al affiliated with the Qaysi camp during the Qays and Yaman conflicts, alongside residents of Jayyous and part of the residents of Bayt Nabala. They fought several skirmishes against Yamani rivals from Qibya and Dayr Tarif.

In 1838 Edward Robinson noted Deir Abu Mesh'al on his travels in the region, as a Muslim village, located in the Beni Zeid district, north of Jerusalem.

In 1870, Victor Guérin found the village to have 450 inhabitants. He further noted: "At the highest point I notice, on a large platform, the traces of a powerful construction, some of which are still inferior, and which was built with beautiful cut stones of a magnificent device. Under this platform reigns a huge cistern dug into the rock. To the south stands a gigantic wall of very thick wall, but built with stones of a much lesser apparatus than those which constitute the lower courses of which I have just spoken. The houses in the village are roughly built, but almost all of them contain ancient materials. Near these Moslem dwellings lay on the leveled rock several areas, perhaps dating back to the earliest antiquity, and which the present fellahs still use to beat their barley or wheat." An Ottoman village list of about the same year, 1870, indicated 33 houses and a population of 159, though the population count included men, only.

In 1882, the PEF's Survey of Western Palestine (SWP) described Deir Abu Meshal as "A small and partly ruinous stone village in a very strong position on a lofty hill. [] A pool exists on the south side of the village, which supplies the place with water."

In 1896 the population of Der abu masch'al was estimated to be about 273 persons.

=== British Mandate era ===
In the 1922 census of Palestine, conducted by the British Mandate authorities, the village, named Dair Abu Masha'al, had a population of 289, all Muslim, increasing in the 1931 census to 404 Muslim, in 88 inhabited houses.

In the 1945 statistics the population of Deir Abu Mash'al was 510 Muslims, with 8,778 dunams (8.8 km^{2}; 3.4 sq mi) of land according to an official land and population survey. Of this, 2,076 dunams were plantations and irrigable land, 1,058 used for cereals, while 19 dunams (1.9 ha; 4.7 acres) were built-up (urban) land.

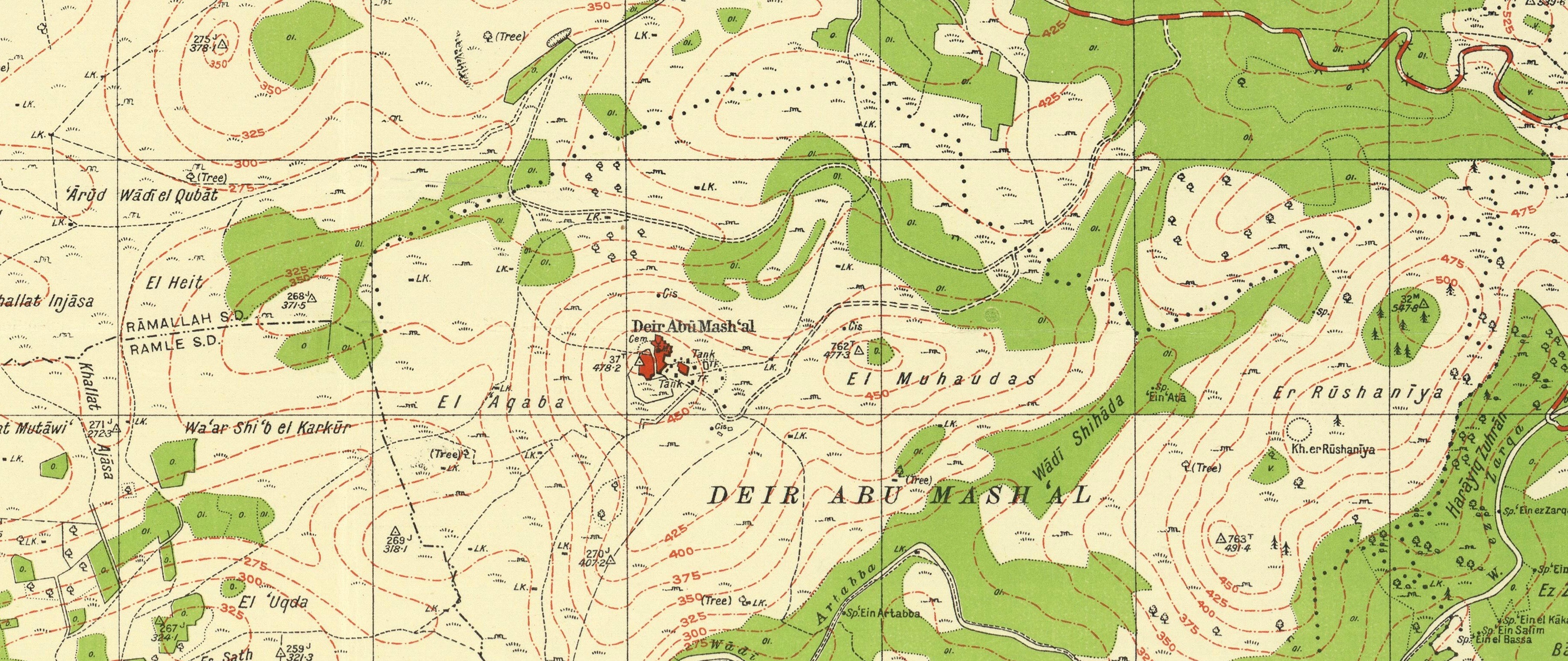
Deir Abu Mash'al 1942 1:20,000 from 1918 survey

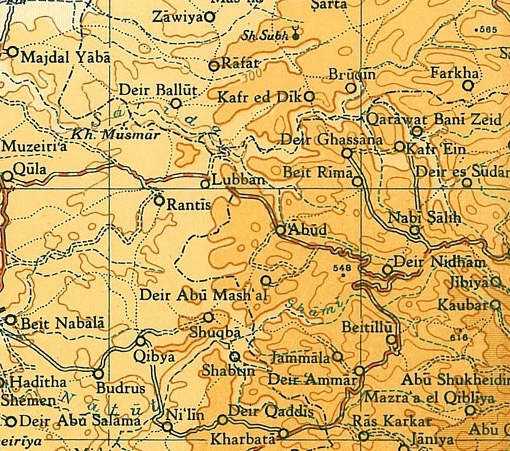
Deir Abu Mash'al 1942 1:250,000

=== Jordanian era ===
In the wake of the 1948 Arab–Israeli War, and after the 1949 Armistice Agreements, Deir Abu Mash'al came under Jordanian rule.

The Jordanian census of 1961 found 987 inhabitants at Deir Abu Mash'al.

=== 1967-present ===
Since the Six-Day War in 1967, Deir Abu Mash'al has been under Israeli occupation.

After the 1995 accords, 85% of village land was classified as Area B, and the remaining 15% as Area C. Israel has confiscated hundreds of dunams of land for bypass roads.

== Bibliography ==
- Barron, J.B., ed. (1923). Palestine: Report and General Abstracts of the Census of 1922. Government of Palestine.
- Clermont-Ganneau, C.S. (1898). "La carte de la Palestine d'apres la mosaique de Madeba". Recueil d'archéologie orientale. 2: 166–176.
- Conder, C.R.; Kitchener, H.H. (1882). The Survey of Western Palestine: Memoirs of the Topography, Orography, Hydrography, and Archaeology. Vol. 2. London: Committee of the Palestine Exploration Fund.
- Ellenblum, R. (2003). Frankish Rural Settlement in the Latin Kingdom of Jerusalem. Cambridge University Press. ISBN 0521521874.
- Finkelstein, I.; Lederman, Zvi, eds. (1997). Highlands of many cultures. Tel Aviv: Institute of Archaeology of Tel Aviv University Publications Section. ISBN 965-440-007-3.
- Government of Jordan, Department of Statistics (1964). First Census of Population and Housing. Volume I: Final Tables; General Characteristics of the Population (PDF).
- Government of Palestine, Department of Statistics (1945). Village Statistics, April, 1945.
- Guérin, V. (1875). Description Géographique Historique et Archéologique de la Palestine (in French). Vol. 2: Samarie, pt. 2. Paris: L'Imprimerie Nationale.
- Hadawi, S. (1970). Village Statistics of 1945: A Classification of Land and Area ownership in Palestine. Palestine Liberation Organization Research Center.
- Hartmann, M. (1883). "Die Ortschaftenliste des Liwa Jerusalem in dem türkischen Staatskalender für Syrien auf das Jahr 1288 der Flucht (1871)". Zeitschrift des Deutschen Palästina-Vereins. 6: 102–149.
- Hütteroth, W.-D.; Abdulfattah, K. (1977). Historical Geography of Palestine, Transjordan and Southern Syria in the Late 16th Century. Erlanger Geographische Arbeiten, Sonderband 5. Erlangen, Germany: Vorstand der Fränkischen Geographischen Gesellschaft. ISBN 3-920405-41-2.
- Mills, E., ed. (1932). Census of Palestine 1931. Population of Villages, Towns and Administrative Areas. Jerusalem: Government of Palestine.
- Palmer, E.H. (1881). The Survey of Western Palestine: Arabic and English Name Lists Collected During the Survey by Lieutenants Conder and Kitchener, R. E. Transliterated and Explained by E.H. Palmer. Committee of the Palestine Exploration Fund.
- Pringle, D. (1997). Secular buildings in the Crusader Kingdom of Jerusalem: an archaeological Gazetteer. Cambridge University Press. ISBN 0521-46010-7.
- Robinson, E.; Smith, E. (1841). Biblical Researches in Palestine, Mount Sinai and Arabia Petraea: A Journal of Travels in the year 1838. Vol. 2. Boston: Crocker & Brewster.
- Robinson, E.; Smith, E. (1841). Biblical Researches in Palestine, Mount Sinai and Arabia Petraea: A Journal of Travels in the year 1838. Vol. 3. Boston: Crocker & Brewster.
- Röhricht, R. (1893). (RRH) Regesta regni Hierosolymitani (MXCVII-MCCXCI) (in Latin). Berlin: Libraria Academica Wageriana.
- Schick, C. (1896). "Zur Einwohnerzahl des Bezirks Jerusalem". Zeitschrift des Deutschen Palästina-Vereins. 19: 120–127.
- Socin, A. (1879). "Alphabetisches Verzeichniss von Ortschaften des Paschalik Jerusalem". Zeitschrift des Deutschen Palästina-Vereins. 2: 135–163.
