= Halamish =

Israeli settlement in the West Bank

Halamish: חַלָּמִישׁ (Hebrew)
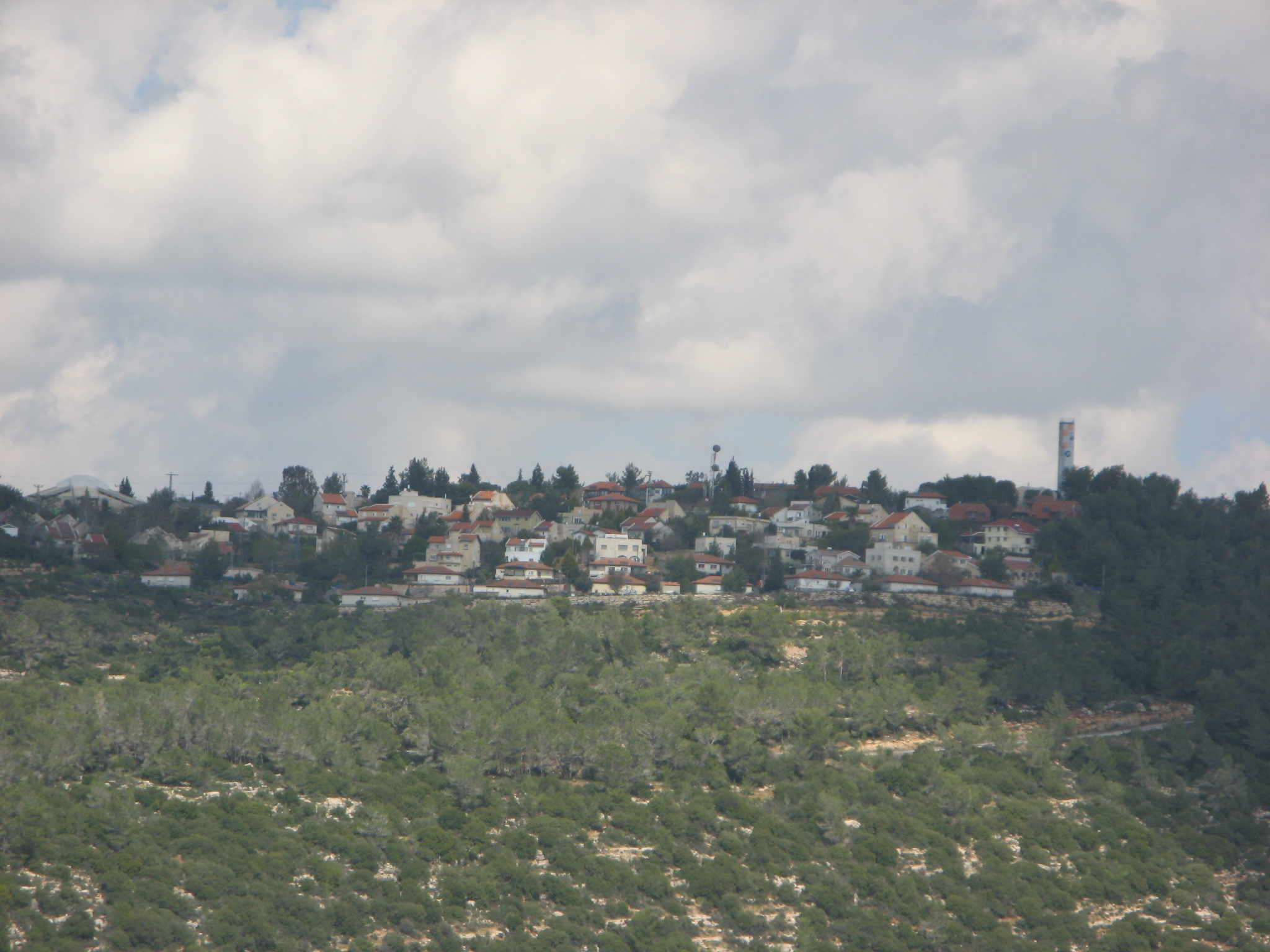

- Location within the Central West Bank Location within Israel Location within the West Bank
- Coordinates: 32°0′21″N 35°7′34″E
- Country: Israel
- District: Judea and Samaria Area
- Council: Mateh Binyamin
- Region: West Bank
- Affiliation: Amana
- Founded: 1 November 1977
- Founder: Gush Emunim
- Population (2024): 1,500
- Website: Neve Tzuf Halamish

Halamish (Hebrew: חַלָּמִישׁ, lit. 'Flint'), also known as Neveh Tzuf (Hebrew: נְוֵה צוּף, lit. 'Oasis of Nectar'), is an Israeli settlement in the West Bank, located in the southwestern Samarian hills to the north of Ramallah, 10.7 kilometers east of the Green line. The Orthodox Jewish community was established in 1977. It is organised as a community settlement and falls under the jurisdiction of Mateh Binyamin Regional Council. In 2024 it had a population of 1,500. On a hill within the settlement is Hovlata, an archeological site dating to the Hasmonean period.

The settlement of Neveh Tzuf is home to the religious pre-army Mechina Elisha.

The international community considers Israeli settlements illegal under international law, but the Israeli government disputes this.

== History ==
On 16 October 1977, two groups of settlers, one religious, calling itself "Neveh Tzuf" and one secular, called "Neveh Tzelah" with a total of 40 families moved into the abandoned former British Tegart fort building near the Palestinian village Nabi Salih. The original name of the settlement, Neveh Tzuf, was rejected by the Government Naming Committee, arguing that it might be misleading as the biblical location Eretz Tzuf was elsewhere. The naming committee gave the new settlement the official name 'Halamish' instead, derived from a biblical verse: He (God) "nourished him with oil from the crag of flint." (Deuteronomy 32:13) Since this name was rejected by some settlers, both names are used for the settlement.

The Israeli Army issued military order 28/78 in 1978 to seize privately owned Palestinian land from the villages of Deir Nidham, Nabi Salih, and Umm Safa and turned over 686 dunams to the newly established settlement. According to ARIJ, Israel confiscated land from several surrounding Palestinian villages in order to construct Halamish; 604 dunams from Deir Nidham, 10 dunams from the Beitillu part of Al-Ittihad. Peace Now reported, based on data from the Israeli Civil Administration, that 34.35% of the land Halamish is built on is privately owned Palestinian property, with 0% being Jewish owned.

On 21 July 2017, three Israelis were killed and one severely wounded in a stabbing attack in Halamish. The residents of Halamish set up an Israeli outpost near the settlement as a response to the attack.

On 20 September 2026, a 36-year-old Israeli-French man who had just finished immersing himself in a spring –a tradition among Jews before their holiest day, Yom Kippur– in the Neve Tzuf area was shot in his car by a Palestinian gunman. He later died in a hospital in Petah Tikva, while the attacker was captured by the IDF near Ramallah. The attacker was identified as Qadri Samara, a Hamas operative.

== Legal status ==
Upon the first work preparing the land, residents of the nearby Palestinian village Deir Nidham went to the Supreme Court of Israel and claimed private ownership of land to be used for settlement. Based on aerial photos from the turn of the 20th century, showing the disputed land to be barren, and Ottoman Empire land law specifying that land not worked for over ten years becomes state land, the land was declared state land and freed for settlement constructions.

The residents of the nearby Palestinian village of Nabi Salih regularly protest against what they allege is the takeover of a spring by the settlers of Halamish. However, the spring was declared an "antiquities site" by the Civil Administration, located on private land belonging to inhabitants of Nabi Salih. Residents of Nabi Salih also assert that they are being prevented from working the fields around the spring. The protests have led to violent clashes, with Palestinian youths throwing stones and Israeli forces firing on protesters with tear gas, rubber bullets, and water cannons. Since the end of 2009, 64 people (13% of the village's population) has been arrested by Israeli forces. Bassem al-Tamimi, one of the leaders of the protests, who was declared a human rights defender by the European Union and a prisoner of conscience by Amnesty International, has been arrested twelve times to date. On 24 March 2011 he was arrested and charged with incitement, holding a march without a permit, sending youths to throw stones, and perverting the course of justice. After an 11-month military trial, he was cleared of the central charge of incitement and of perverting the course of justice by an Israeli military court, but found guilty of taking part in illegal demonstrations and of soliciting protesters to throw stones largely based on the testimony of two Palestinian youths aged 14 and 15. After being released on bail on 24 April 2012, he was given a 13-month sentence in May 2012, corresponding to the time he had served in prison while awaiting trial.

The international community considers Israeli settlements in the Israeli-occupied West Bank to be illegal under international law, violating the Fourth Geneva Convention's prohibition on the transfer of civilians into or out of occupied territory. Israel however disputes that the Fourth Geneva Convention applies to the West Bank and disputes their illegality.

== Notable residents ==
- Avi Bluth (born 1974), major general of the IDF
