= Na'ale =

Israeli settlement in the West Bank

Na'ale: נעלה (Hebrew)
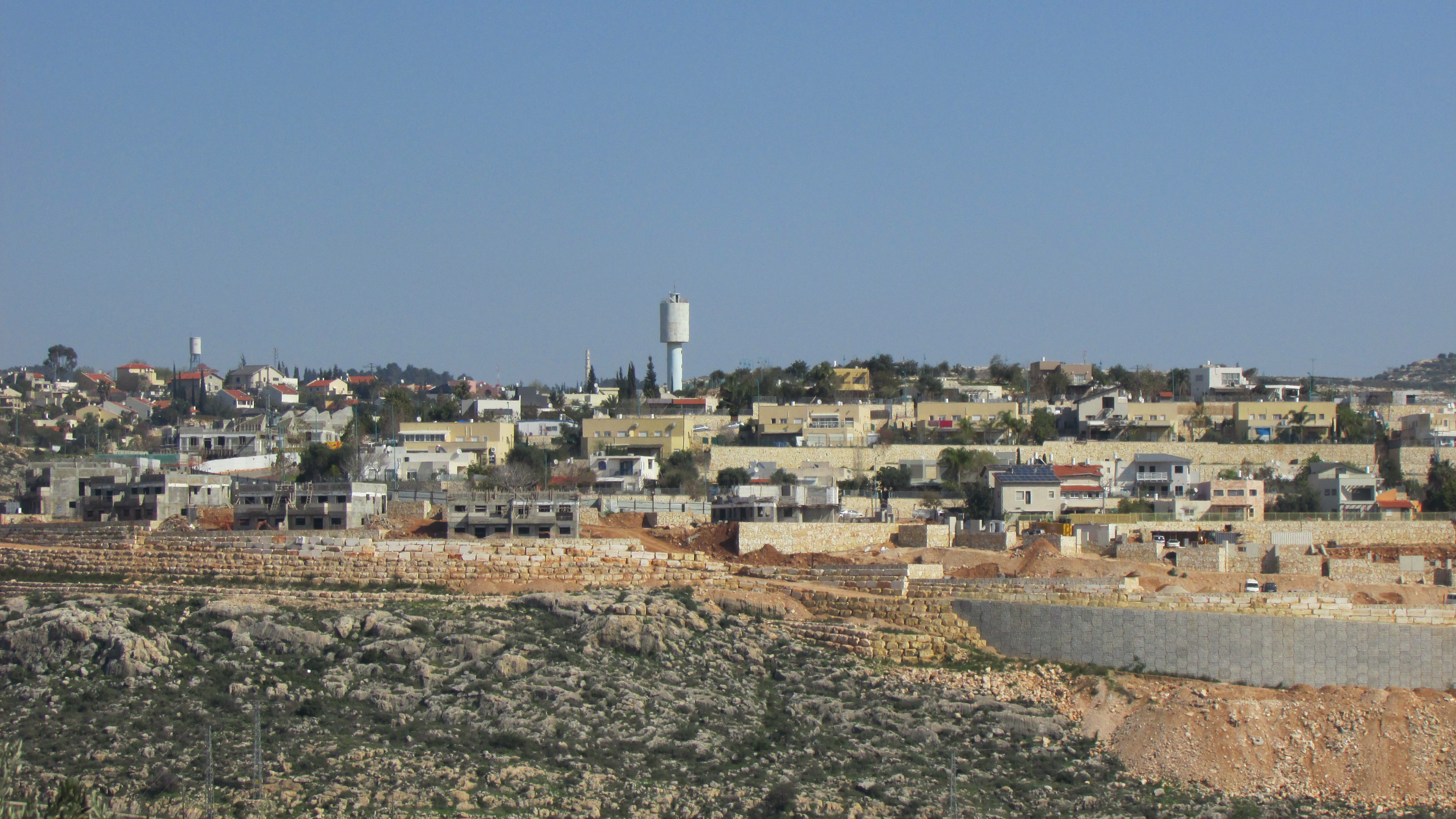
- Etymology: Exalted
- Location within the Central West Bank Location within the West Bank
- Coordinates: 31°57′45″N 35°3′51″E
- Country: Palestine
- District: Judea and Samaria Area
- Council: Mateh Binyamin
- Region: West Bank
- Founded: 1988
- Founder: Israel Aerospace Industries employees
- Population (2024): 2,932
- Website: nahale.org.il

Na'ale (Hebrew: נעלה, lit. 'Exalted') is an Israeli settlement in the West Bank. Located near Modi'in, it falls under the jurisdiction of Mateh Binyamin Regional Council. In 2024 it had a population of 2,932.

The international community considers Israeli settlements in the West Bank illegal under international law, but the Israeli government disputes this.

According to the ARIJ, the settlement was built on land confiscated from the Palestinian towns of Al-Ittihad (Jammala), Deir Qaddis and Shabtin.
