= Al-Janiya =

al-Janiya
- Municipality type D (Village council)

Arabic transcription(s)
  - Arabic: الجانيه
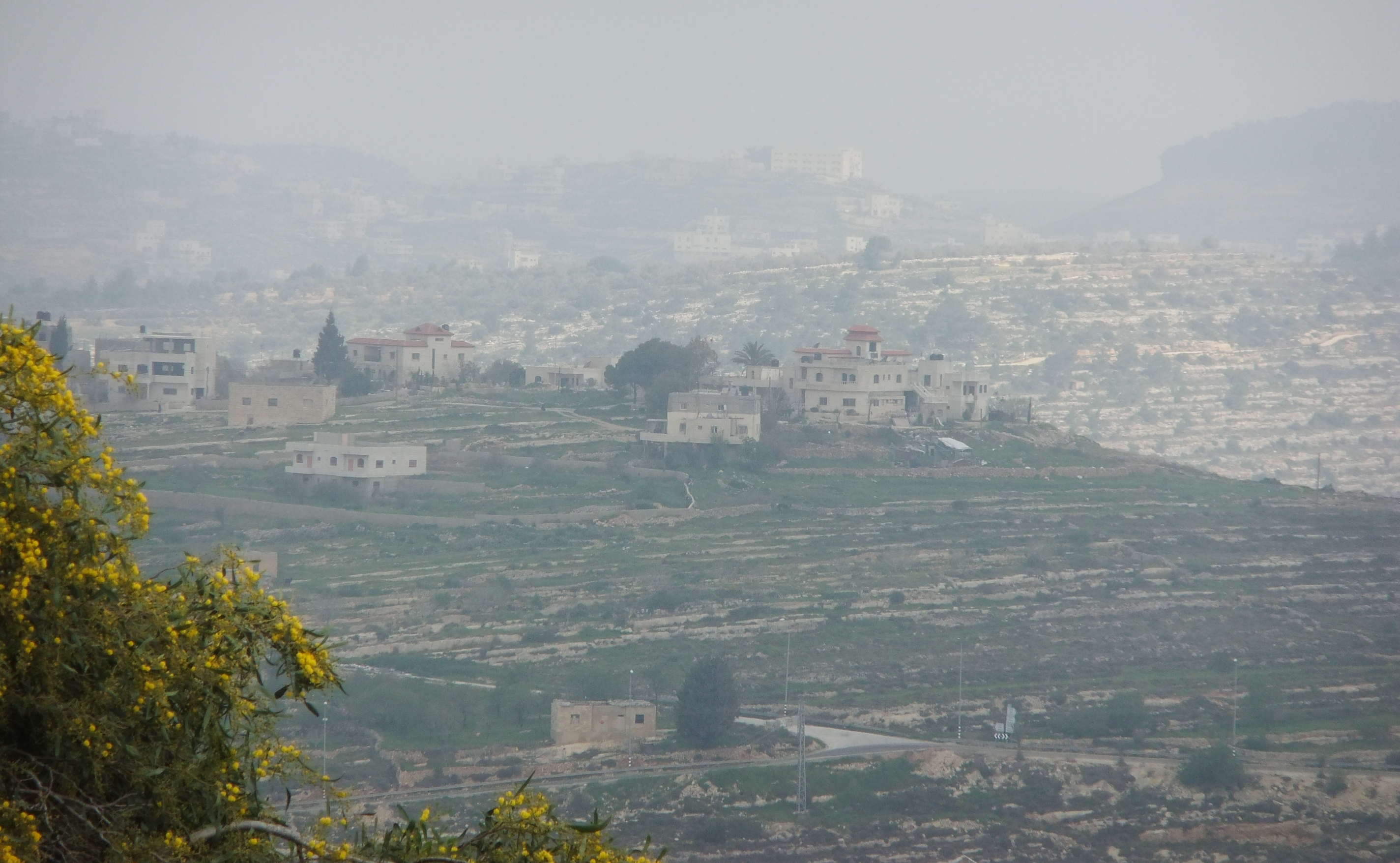

- Location of al-Janiya within Palestine
- Coordinates: 31°56′18″N 35°07′19″E
- Palestine grid: 161/149
- State: State of Palestine
- Governorate: Ramallah and al-Bireh

Government
  - Type: Village council

Population (2017)
  - Total: 1,296
- Name meaning: "to gather fruit"

Al-Janiya (Arabic: الجانيه) is a Palestinian village in the Ramallah and al-Bireh Governorate located 8 kilometers northwest of Ramallah in the northern West Bank. According to the Palestinian Central Bureau of Statistics (PCBS), the village had a population of 1,296 inhabitants by 2017.

== Location ==
Al Janiya is located 8.5 km west of Ramallah. It is bordered by Al-Zaytouneh and Ein Qiniya to the east, Ras Karkar and Kafr Ni'ma to the west, Al-Zaytouneh and Al-Itihad to the north, and Deir Ibzi to the south.

== Etymology ==
Originally called Dajānah /[id-]Dəjāniyi, الدجانية/ in 16th century Ottoman documents, the surname Dajāni الدجاني is derived from it. Roy Marom and Ran Zadok have shown that the initial /d/ was lost for assimilation of the silent /d/ with the /j/ [dj/ like in jāj < dəjāj < dajāj “chicken”.

== History and archaeology ==
=== Iron Age to Mamluk period ===
Sherds from the Iron Age II, Hellenistic, Roman and Byzantine periods have been found here. Sherds have also been found here from the Crusader/Ayyubid and Mamluk periods. There are Arabic and Greek inscriptions in the village mosque, which has been dated to 731 A.H., that is, 1330-31 C.E.

=== Ottoman period ===
Sherds from the Early Ottoman period have been found there. In the Ottoman census of 1500s, Dajjaniyya was located in the nahiya of Quds.

In 1838 el-Janieh was noted as partly a Greek Christian and partly a Muslim village, part of Beni Harith area, located north of Jerusalem.

Al-Janiya, together with er-Ras, were the chief towns for the ruling family of Simhan. The chief Sheikh of the Simhan family was Isma'il, who was killed by Ibrahim Pasha in the 1834 uprising. After Isma'il, Hasan es-Sa'id and Mohammah ibn Isma'il became the rulers.

In 1870, Victor Guérin found it to be a village of 400 inhabitants, all Muslims except a few "Greek schismatics". He also suggested that the mosque stood on the site of a previous church. An Ottoman village list from about same year found that the village had a population of 29 "Greeks" in 8 houses, and 268 Muslims in 58 houses, though the population survey only counted the men. It was noted that it was located NWW of Ramallah.

In 1882, the PEF's Survey of Western Palestine (SWP) described it: "A small village on high ground, with two Mukams and a well on the east; on the north is a modern graveyard. Olives exist round."

Two different estimates were given of the population of Ed-dschanije in 1896, one gave a population of 528, while another estimate gave the population to be 342 Muslims and 36 Christians.

=== British Mandate ===
In the 1922 census of Palestine conducted by the British Mandate authorities, Al-Janiya had a population of 180; 177 Muslims and 3 Orthodox Christians. This had increased by the time of the 1931 census to 250, 245 Muslims and 5 Christians, in 60 houses.

In the 1945 statistics the population was 300, all Muslims, while the total land area was 7,565 dunams, according to an official land and population survey. Of this, 2,961 were plantations and irrigable land, 1,423 for cereals, while 40 dunams were classified as built-up (urban) areas.

=== Jordanian period ===
In the wake of the 1948 Arab–Israeli War and after the 1949 Armistice Agreements, Al-Janiya came under Jordanian rule.

The Jordanian census of 1961 found 451 inhabitants in Janiya.

=== Post-1967 ===
Since the Six-Day War in 1967, Al-Janiya has been under Israeli occupation.

After the 1995 accords, 7.9% of village land was classified as Area B, the remaining 92.1% as Area C. 867 dunams of land was confiscated for the Israeli settlement of Dolev, in addition to 1,667 dunams for the settlement of Talmon.

In 1989, 4,000 acres of privately owned land in Al-Janiya was confiscated and given to the Israeli settlement of Talmon. By 2010, Al-Janiya had lost 10,000 acres due to Israeli confiscations.

By 2012, Israeli settlers regularly came armed, taking control of a local water source. The spring, Ein El Masraj, earlier used for irrigation by Al-Janiya, had been physically taken over by Israeli settlers from Talmon, who had renamed it Ein Talmon. The spring Ein El Mallah, used by Al-Janiya both for domestic use and irrigation, was in danger of being taken over. The spring pools are being used by children for cooling down during the hot months.

By 2014, farming on local land was difficult, since Israeli authorities have declared much of it, enclosing olive groves, a 'closed military zone', which Palestinian farmers are allowed to access on average only two days a year, and many of the trees are uprooted by settlers.

In November 2016, Israeli settlers attacked four Palestinian farmers while they were harvesting their olives. The settlers, according to Palestinian witnesses and victims, shouted "Kill the Arabs" and "we will kill you, you sluts", and were armed with knives and clubs. After beating them up, they were filmed returning to an outpost below Neria, Mateh Binyamin.

== Maqam of ash-Sheikh Ahmed a-Dajani ==
In the center of the village al-Janiya, housed within a mosque, lies the maqam (holy tomb) of ash-Sheikh Ahmed a-Dajani. This Sufi sheikh, hailing from North Africa, resided in the village, then called Dajjaniyya, during the 16th century. He is considered a patriarch of the Dajani family of Jerusalem, whose members are said to be from the lineage of Husayn ibn Ali. However, the tomb bears an inscription stating it was built in 1330, a date that does not align with the time of the saint, which according to Muslim sources, was buried in the Mamilla Cemetery in Jerusalem in 1562.

Al-Dajani's occupation involved overseeing trade convoys traveling from Fez in Morocco to Medina in the Arabian Peninsula. However, after a conflict with the wealthiest family in the village, he decided to depart, despite the village mukhtar requesting him to stay. Before leaving, he agreed to change his last name to raise the prestige and renown of the village, ensuring everyone would know he had been a resident there. Angered by the behavior of the local villagers towards the sheikh, the mukhtar declared that he would change the name of Dajjaniyya to the current name, al-Janiya.

== Bibliography ==
- Barron, J.B., ed. (1923). Palestine: Report and General Abstracts of the Census of 1922. Government of Palestine.
- Clermont-Ganneau, C.S. (1900). Recueil d'archéologie orientale (in French). Vol. 3. Paris: Ernest Leroux.
- Conder, C.R.; Kitchener, H.H. (1882). The Survey of Western Palestine: Memoirs of the Topography, Orography, Hydrography, and Archaeology. Vol. 2. London: Committee of the Palestine Exploration Fund.
- Dauphin, C. (1998). La Palestine byzantine, Peuplement et Populations. BAR International Series 726 (in French). Vol. III : Catalogue. Oxford: Archeopress. ISBN 0-860549-05-4.
- Finkelstein, I.; Lederman, Zvi, eds. (1997). Highlands of many cultures. Tel Aviv: Institute of Archaeology of Tel Aviv University Publications Section. ISBN 965-440-007-3.
- Government of Jordan, Department of Statistics (1964). First Census of Population and Housing. Volume I: Final Tables; General Characteristics of the Population (PDF).
- Government of Palestine, Department of Statistics (1945). Village Statistics, April, 1945.
- Guérin, V. (1875). Description Géographique Historique et Archéologique de la Palestine (in French). Vol. 2: Samarie, pt. 2. Paris: L'Imprimerie Nationale.
- Hadawi, S. (1970). Village Statistics of 1945: A Classification of Land and Area ownership in Palestine. Palestine Liberation Organization Research Center. Archived from the original on 2018-12-08.
- Hartmann, M. (1883). "Die Ortschaftenliste des Liwa Jerusalem in dem türkischen Staatskalender für Syrien auf das Jahr 1288 der Flucht (1871)". Zeitschrift des Deutschen Palästina-Vereins. 6: 102–149.
- Macalister, R. A.S.; Mastermind, E.W.G. (1905). "The modern inhabitants of Palestine". Quarterly Statement - Palestine Exploration Fund. 37: 343–356. doi:10.1179/peq.1905.37.4.343.
- Mills, E., ed. (1932). Census of Palestine 1931. Population of Villages, Towns and Administrative Areas. Jerusalem: Government of Palestine.
- Palmer, E.H. (1881). The Survey of Western Palestine: Arabic and English Name Lists Collected During the Survey by Lieutenants Conder and Kitchener, R. E. Transliterated and Explained by E.H. Palmer. Committee of the Palestine Exploration Fund.
- Peters, J.P. (1903). "Palestinian exploration". JBL. 22: 15–31.
- Peters, J.P. (1904). "Visit to Kefr Shiyan, Janieh, and neighbourhoods". Quarterly Statement - Palestine Exploration Fund. 36: 377–385.
- Robinson, E.; Smith, E. (1841). Biblical Researches in Palestine, Mount Sinai and Arabia Petraea: A Journal of Travels in the year 1838. Vol. 2. Boston: Crocker & Brewster.
- Robinson, E.; Smith, E. (1841). Biblical Researches in Palestine, Mount Sinai and Arabia Petraea: A Journal of Travels in the year 1838. Vol. 3. Boston: Crocker & Brewster.
- de Rozière, E., ed. (1849). Cartulaire de l'église du Saint Sépulchre de Jérusalem: publié d'après les manuscrits du Vatican (in Latin and French). Paris: Imprimerie nationale.
- Röhricht, R. (1893). (RRH) Regesta regni Hierosolymitani (MXCVII-MCCXCI) (in Latin). Berlin: Libraria Academica Wageriana.
- Schick, C. (1896). "Zur Einwohnerzahl des Bezirks Jerusalem". Zeitschrift des Deutschen Palästina-Vereins. 19: 120–127.
- Sharon, M. (2016). Corpus Inscriptionum Arabicarum Palaestinae, J (I). Vol. 6. BRILL. ISBN 978-90-04-32479-4.
- Socin, A. (1879). "Alphabetisches Verzeichniss von Ortschaften des Paschalik Jerusalem". Zeitschrift des Deutschen Palästina-Vereins. 2: 135–163.
- Toledano, E. (1984). "The Sanjaq of Jerusalem in the Sixteenth Century: Aspects of Topography and Population". Archivum Ottomanicum. 9: 279–319. Archived from the original on 2016-03-05.
- Wright, T.F. (1904). "Inscription at Janiah". Quarterly Statement - Palestine Exploration Fund. 36 @: 180–181.
