= Shabtin =

- Municipality type C

Arabic transcription(s)
  - Arabic: شبتين/شبطين
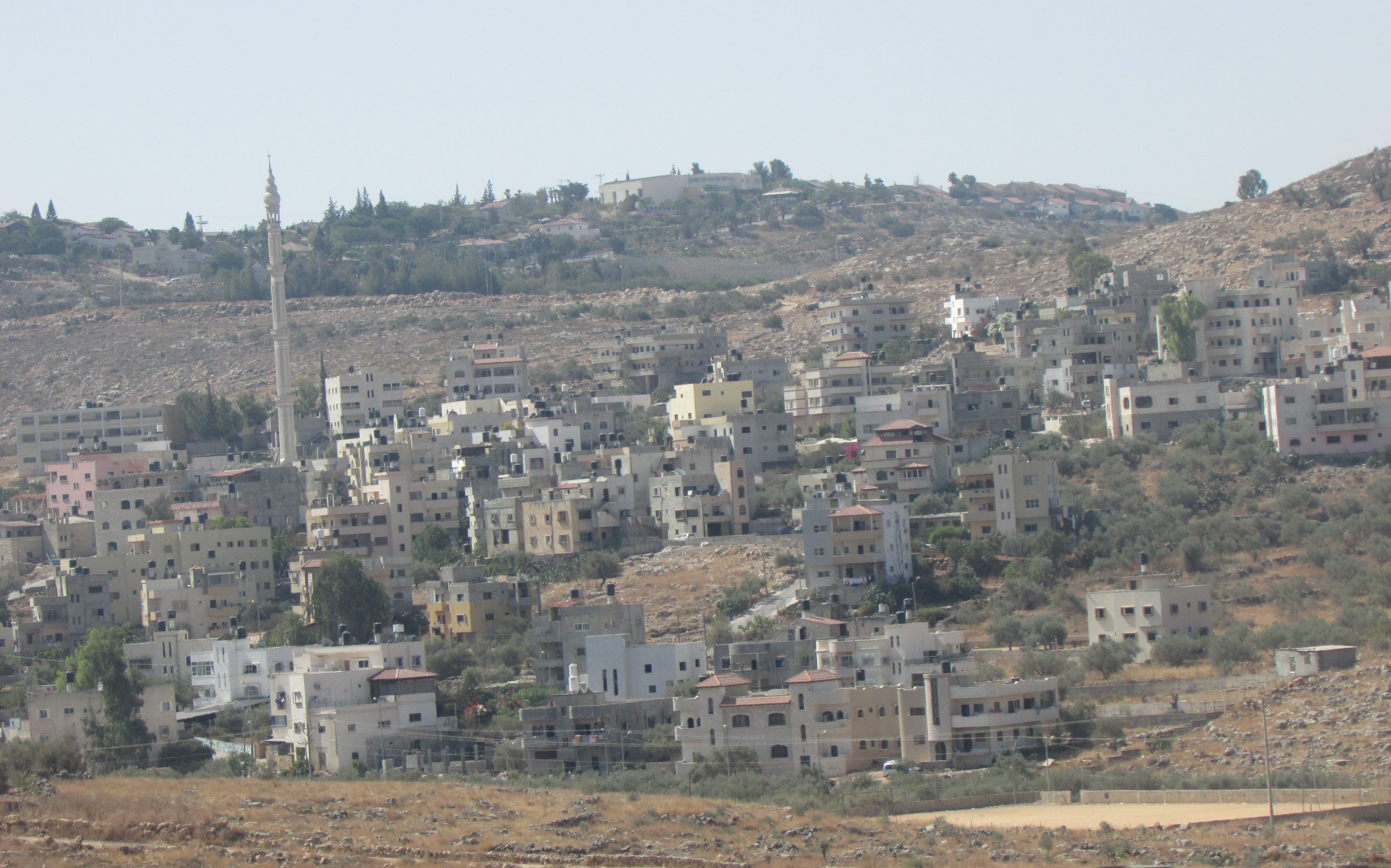
- Shabtin

- Location of Shabtin within Palestine
- Coordinates: 31°58′26″N 35°02′59″E
- Palestine grid: 154/153
- State: State of Palestine
- Governorate: Ramallah and al-Bireh

Government
  - Type: Municipality

Population (2017)
  - Total: 1,136
- Name meaning: from personal name

Shabtin is a Palestinian village in the Ramallah and al-Bireh Governorate of the State of Palestine, in the central West Bank.

Shabtin is located 14.4 kilometres (9 mi) north-west of Ramallah. Shabtin is bordered by Al Itihad to the east, Shuqba to the north, Ni'lin to the west, and Deir Qaddis to the south.

== Etymology ==
The name Šabtīn /Šibtīn/ is Aramaic, and means ““sticks, canes”.

== History ==
Just southeast of the village (at grid no. 1544/1528) is Kh. Shabtin, where pottery sherds from the Persian, Persian/Hellenistic, late Roman, Byzantine Umayyad/Abbasid eras have been found. The SWP noted "Traces of ruins" here.

Pottery sherds from the Roman/Byzantine eras have been found at Shabtin.

During the Crusader era, the area was a Crusader stronghold, centred around Aboud. Remains of a house from Crusader era have been identified in the centre of Shabtin.

Sherds from the Mamluk era have been found in Shabtin, together with a hoard of 45 Mamluk gold coins.

=== Ottoman era ===
The current village was founded in the 18th century or in the early 19th century.

Sherds from the early Ottoman Empire has also been found here.

In the 1840s, the village got caught up in the Qays–Yaman rivalry and was at one time plundered.

In 1870, Victor Guérin noted the village, Cheptin, on the slopes of a hill in the distance. An Ottoman village list of the same year, 1870, showed that Schetin had 16 houses and a population of 42, though the population count only included men.

In 1882, the PEF's Survey of Western Palestine (SWP) described ‘’Shebtin’’ as: "a small village in a valley, with a well to the east. It appears to be an ancient site, and has rock cut tombs south of it."

=== British Mandate era ===
In the 1922 census of Palestine, conducted by the British Mandate authorities, Shebtin had a population of 63 inhabitants, all Muslims, increasing in the 1931 census to a population of 110, still all Muslim, in 20 houses.

In 1945 statistics the population of Shabtin was 150 Muslims, with 4,423 dunams of land, according to an official land and population survey. Of this, 27 dunams were used for plantations and irrigable land, 1,158 dunams for cereals, while 7 dunams were built-up (urban) land.

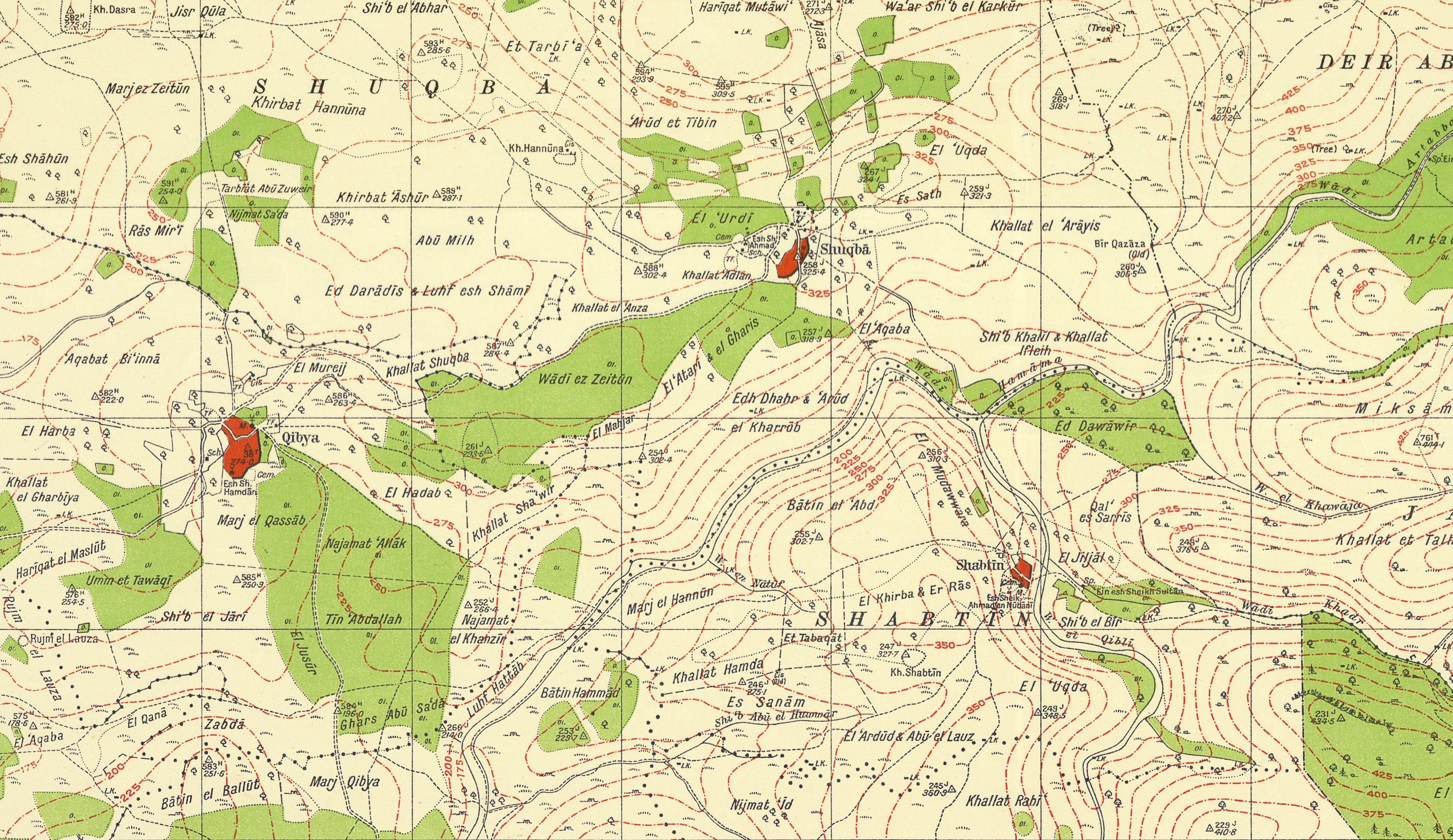
Shabtin 1944 1:20,000

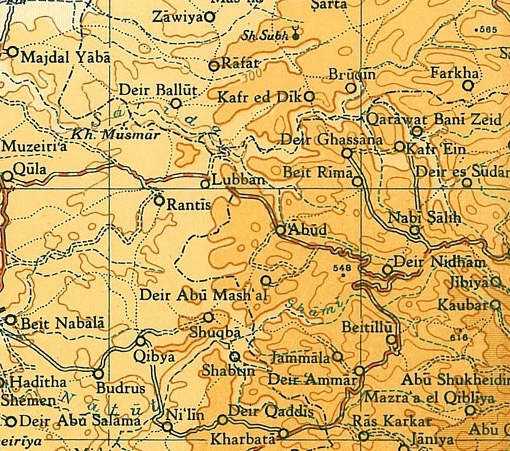
Shabtin 1945 1:250,000

=== Jordanian era ===
In the wake of the 1948 Arab–Israeli War, Shabtin came under Jordanian rule.

The Jordanian census of 1961 found 232 inhabitants.

=== Post-1967 ===
During the Six-Day War in 1967, Shabtin came under Israeli occupation.

After the 1995 accords, 7.2% of Shabtin land was classified as Area B, the remaining 92.8% as Area C.

Israel has confiscated 1,781 dunams of land from Shabtin in order to construct two settlements, Nili and Na'aleh.

== Bibliography ==
- Barron, J.B., ed. (1923). Palestine: Report and General Abstracts of the Census of 1922. Government of Palestine.
- Conder, C. R.; Kitchener, H.H. (1882). The Survey of Western Palestine: Memoirs of the Topography, Orography, Hydrography, and Archaeology. Vol. 2. London: Committee of the Palestine Exploration Fund.
- Dauphin, C. (1998). La Palestine byzantine, Peuplement et Populations. BAR International Series 726 (in French). Vol. III : Catalogue. Oxford: Archeopress. ISBN 0-860549-05-4.
- Ellenblum, R. (2003). Frankish Rural Settlement in the Latin Kingdom of Jerusalem. Cambridge University Press. ISBN 9780521521871.
- Finkelstein, I.; Lederman, Zvi, eds. (1997). Highlands of many cultures. Tel Aviv: Institute of Archaeology of Tel Aviv University Publications Section. ISBN 965-440-007-3.
- Government of Jordan, Department of Statistics (1964). First Census of Population and Housing. Volume I: Final Tables; General Characteristics of the Population (PDF).
- Government of Palestine, Department of Statistics (1945). Village Statistics, April, 1945.
- Guérin, V. (1875). Description Géographique Historique et Archéologique de la Palestine (in French). Vol. 2: Samarie, pt. 2. Paris: L'Imprimerie Nationale.
- Macalister, R.A.S.; Masterman, E.W.G. (1906). "Occasional Papers on the Modern inhabitants of Palestine, part III". Quarterly Statement - Palestine Exploration Fund. 38: 33–50. doi:10.1179/peq.1906.38.1.33.
- Hartmann, M. (1883). "Die Ortschaftenliste des Liwa Jerusalem in dem türkischen Staatskalender für Syrien auf das Jahr 1288 der Flucht (1871)". Zeitschrift des Deutschen Palästina-Vereins. 6: 102–149.
- Mills, E., ed. (1932). Census of Palestine 1931. Population of Villages, Towns and Administrative Areas. Jerusalem: Government of Palestine.
- Palmer, E.H. (1881). The Survey of Western Palestine: Arabic and English Name Lists Collected During the Survey by Lieutenants Conder and Kitchener, R. E. Transliterated and Explained by E.H. Palmer. Committee of the Palestine Exploration Fund.
- Socin, A. (1879). "Alphabetisches Verzeichniss von Ortschaften des Paschalik Jerusalem". Zeitschrift des Deutschen Palästina-Vereins. 2: 135–163.
