= Ras Karkar =

Palestinian village in Ramallah and al-Bireh, State of Palestine

- Municipality type C

Arabic transcription(s)
  - Arabic: رأس كركر
  - Latin: Er-Ras (unofficial)
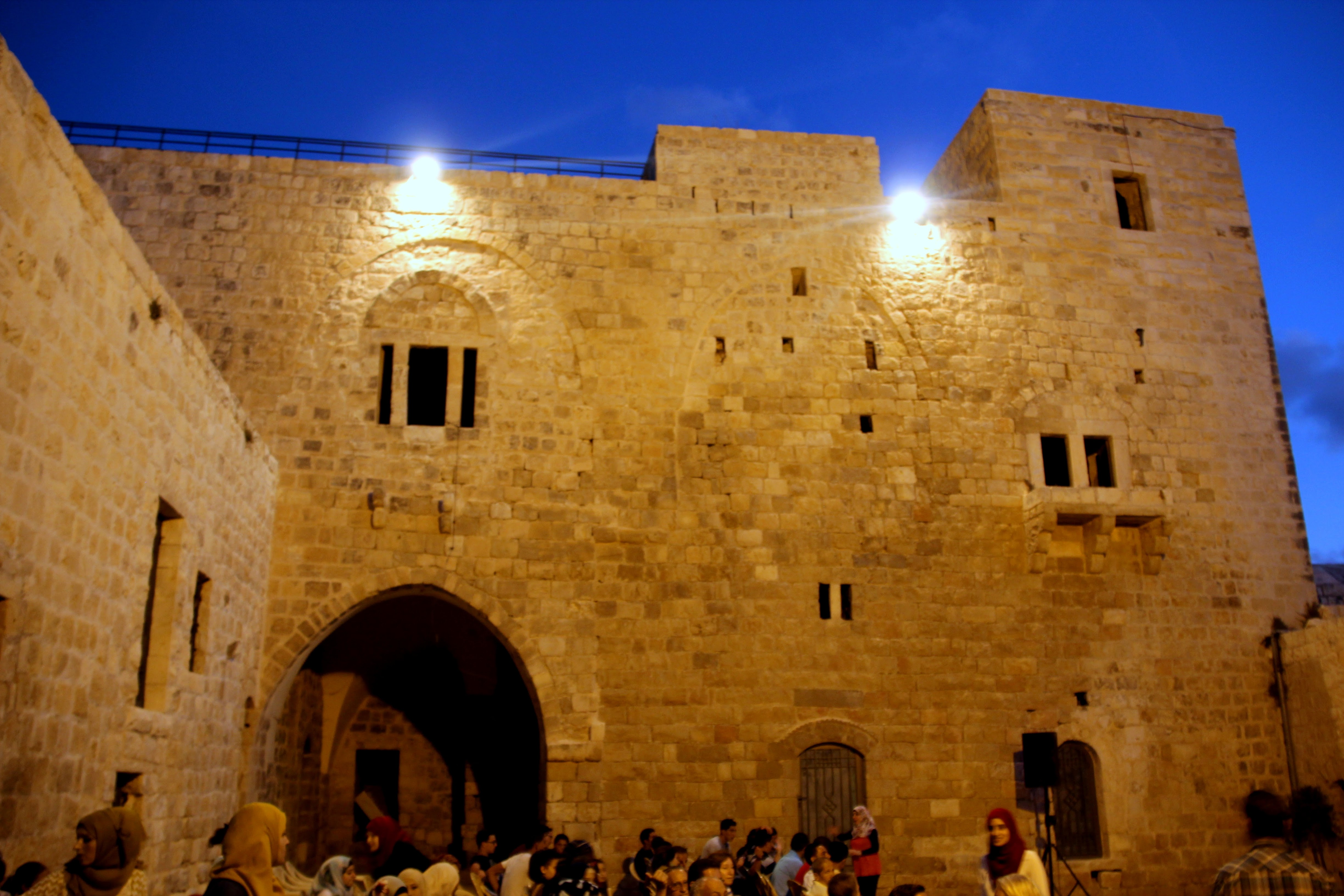
- Ras Karkar castle

- Location of Ras Karkar within Palestine
- Coordinates: 31°56′37″N 35°06′18″E
- Palestine grid: 159/150
- State: State of Palestine
- Governorate: Ramallah and al-Bireh

Government
  - Type: Municipality

Population (2017)
  - Total: 1,956
- Name meaning: The Hill-top

Ras Karkar (Arabic: رأس كركر) is a Palestinian village in the Ramallah and al-Bireh Governorate of the State of Palestine, located 11 kilometers (6.8 mi) northwest of Ramallah in the northern West Bank.

Ras Karkar is a small village situated atop a commanding hill. One of the throne villages of the late Ottoman period, It is home to a fortified sheikh house built during the early 19th century by the Simhan family. According to the Palestinian Central Bureau of Statistics (PCBS), the town had a population of 1,956 inhabitants in 2017.

== Location ==
Ras Karkar is bordered by Al-Janiya to the east, Al-Itihad to the north, Kharbatha Bani Harith to the west, and Kafr Ni'ma to the south.

== History ==
Potsherds from the Hellenistic, Mamluk and early Ottoman era have been found.

=== Ottoman era ===
Ras Karkar does not appear in 16th century records. It is home to a fortress that was built, possibly in 1812, by the SImhan family which dominated the area in the 19th century. The land was purchased from a Christian family, probably in the late 19th century.

The village, also known as Ras Ibn Samhan, is topped with a castle on a high, rocky and sharply sloping mountain surrounded by cactus trees. One of the many throne villages (a central village dominated by a semi-feudal family which controlled tens of villages around it) in Palestine, the castle of the Samhan family, erected in 18th or 19th century, is the subject of a preservation effort, and provides proof of the great power and wealth held by its owners at the time.

The chief Sheikh of the Simhan family was Isma'il, who was killed by Ibrahim Pasha in the 1834 uprising. After Isma'il, Hasan es-Sa'id and Mohammah ibn Isma'il became the rulers.

Edward Robinson passed by in 1838, and described the place as "a castle". It was also noted as a Muslim village, located in the Beni Harith district, west of Jerusalem.

Ras Karkar was ruled by Sheikh Ismail Ibn Samhan who was respected and appreciated by his clan for the many contributions and support that he provided. Sheikh Ismail was killed by the Abu Ghosh family which controlled another throne village near Ras Karkar, and the castle was handed over to his nephew Hussein.

An Ottoman village list from about 1870 showed that Ras Karkar had 16 houses and a population of 74, though the population count included men only.

In 1882 the PEF's Survey of Western Palestine (SWP) described Ras Kerker as "a small village in a lofty position, with a spring below it on the north. In the middle of the village is a fortress built about 50 year since. The place was the seat of the great native family of Beni Simhan."

In 1896 the population of Er-Ras was estimated to be about 210 persons.

=== British Mandate era ===
In the 1922 census of Palestine conducted by the British Mandate authorities, Ras Kerker had a population of 209 Muslims, increasing in the 1931 census to 291 Muslims, in a total of 75 houses.

In the 1945 statistics, the population was 340 Muslims, while the total land area was 5,883 dunams, according to an official land and population survey. Of this, 3,366 were allocated for plantations and irrigable land, 1,237 for cereals, while 12 dunams were classified as built-up areas.

=== Jordanian era ===
In the wake of the 1948 Arab–Israeli War, and after the 1949 Armistice Agreements, Ras Karkar came under Jordanian rule.

In 1961, the population of Ras Karkar was 478.

=== post-1967 ===
After the Six-Day War in 1967, Ras Karkar has been under Israeli occupation.

The population of Ras Karker in the 1967 census conducted by the Israeli authorities was 399, 19 of whom originated from the Israeli territory.

After the 1995 accords, 18.6% of Ras Karkar's land was classified as Area B, while the remaining 81.4% is Area C. Israel has confiscated land from Ras Karkar for the establishment of the Israeli outpost "Zayt Ra'nan", and for the construction of roads leading to the Israeli settlement of Talmon.

The castle is surrounded with historic buildings, overlooking to the west the mountains leading to the Mediterranean Sea and to the south, the city of Jerusalem. The village fields below are planted with olive trees.

Entering the now abandoned castle from the northern gate leads to a large courtyard surrounded by a row of rooms. Al-Iliyeh, which is the highest room in the three-floor castle, was used for administrative purposes and as the Sheikh's private refuge. Narrow hallways and oil storage containers, as well as decorations and poems carved in the castle's walls and stones are among the things one can see there.

== Naby Annir ==
Just north of Ras Karkar is Neby Annir, meaning "The prophet Annir". According to Tawfiq Canaan, writing in 1927, this place (called en−Nebi 'Annir in Beni Harit) was formerly a place of pilgrimage (mawasim), taking place about the same time as the Nabi Musa religious festival; at the Djum'et el-'Alemat, or Feast of the Flags, on Good Friday.

== Bibliography ==
- Barron, J.B., ed. (1923). Palestine: Report and General Abstracts of the Census of 1922. Government of Palestine.
- Canaan, T. (1927). Mohammedan Saints and Sanctuaries in Palestine. London: Luzac & Co.
- Conder, C.R.; Kitchener, H.H. (1882). The Survey of Western Palestine: Memoirs of the Topography, Orography, Hydrography, and Archaeology. Vol. 2. London: Committee of the Palestine Exploration Fund.
- Finkelstein, I.; Lederman, Zvi, eds. (1997). Highlands of many cultures. Tel Aviv: Institute of Archaeology of Tel Aviv University Publications Section. ISBN 965-440-007-3.
- Government of Jordan, Department of Statistics (1964). First Census of Population and Housing. Volume I: Final Tables; General Characteristics of the Population (PDF).
- Government of Palestine, Department of Statistics (1945). Village Statistics, April, 1945.
- Hadawi, S. (1970). Village Statistics of 1945: A Classification of Land and Area ownership in Palestine. Palestine Liberation Organization Research Center.
- Hartmann, M. (1883). "Die Ortschaftenliste des Liwa Jerusalem in dem türkischen Staatskalender für Syrien auf das Jahr 1288 der Flucht (1871)". Zeitschrift des Deutschen Palästina-Vereins. 6: 102–149.
- Macalister, R.A.S.; Masterman, E.W.G. (1905). "The modern inhabitants of Palestine". Quarterly Statement - Palestine Exploration Fund. 37: 343–356. doi:10.1179/peq.1905.37.4.343. S2CID 161632875.
- Mills, E., ed. (1932). Census of Palestine 1931. Population of Villages, Towns and Administrative Areas. Jerusalem: Government of Palestine.
- Palmer, E.H. (1881). The Survey of Western Palestine: Arabic and English Name Lists Collected During the Survey by Lieutenants Conder and Kitchener, R. E. Transliterated and Explained by E.H. Palmer. Committee of the Palestine Exploration Fund.
- Robinson, E.; Smith, E. (1841). Biblical Researches in Palestine, Mount Sinai and Arabia Petraea: A Journal of Travels in the year 1838. Vol. 2. Boston: Crocker & Brewster.
- Robinson, E.; Smith, E. (1841). Biblical Researches in Palestine, Mount Sinai and Arabia Petraea: A Journal of Travels in the year 1838. Vol. 3. Boston: Crocker & Brewster.
- Schick, C. (1896). "Zur Einwohnerzahl des Bezirks Jerusalem". Zeitschrift des Deutschen Palästina-Vereins. 19: 120–127.
- Socin, A. (1879). "Alphabetisches Verzeichniss von Ortschaften des Paschalik Jerusalem". Zeitschrift des Deutschen Palästina-Vereins. 2: 135–163.
