= Deir Nidham =

- Municipality type D (Village council)

Arabic transcription(s)
  - Arabic: دير نظام
  - Latin: Deir Nizam (unofficial)
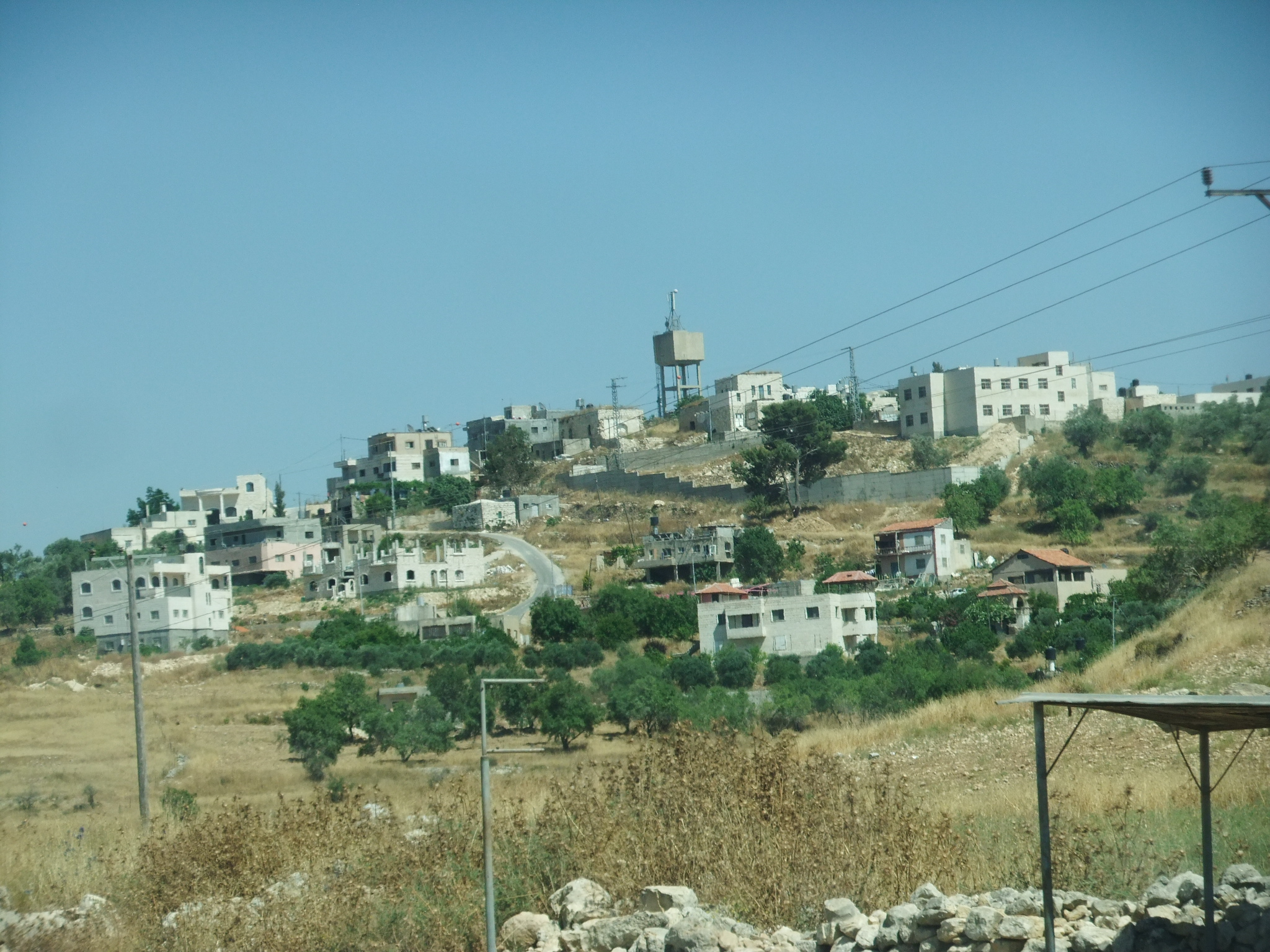
- View of Deir Nidham, 2012

- Location of Deir Nidham within Palestine
- Coordinates: 32°0′10″N 35°6′49″E
- Palestine grid: 160/156
- State: State of Palestine
- Governorate: Ramallah and al-Bireh

Government
  - Type: Village council
  - Head of Municipality: Abdul Nasser Faraj Hamed al-Tamimi

Area
  - Total: 4.0 km^{2} (1.5 sq mi)
- Elevation: 573 m (1,880 ft)

Population (2017)
  - Total: 876
  - Density: 220/km^{2} (570/sq mi)
- Name meaning: "The monastery of the marshal"
- Website: www.deir-nidham.org

Deir Nidham (Arabic: دير نظام) is a Palestinian village in the Ramallah and al-Bireh Governorate in the central West Bank. It is located approximately 23 kilometers (14 mi) northwest of the city of Ramallah and its elevation is 590 meters (1,940 ft). According to the Palestinian Central Bureau of Statistics (PCBS) 2017 census, the town had a population of 876.

== Location ==
Deir Nidham is located 13.7 kilometers (8.5 mi) northwest of Ramallah. It is bordered by Umm Safa and Kobar to the east, Nabi Salih and Bani Zeid to the north, 'Abud and Bani Zeid to the west, and Al-Itihad to the south.

== History ==
Sherds have been found here from the Byzantine, Crusader/Ayyubid and Mamluk eras. The Mandatory DOA documented a columbarium and a plain mosaic floor at the site.

=== Ottoman era ===
In 1517, the village was included in the Ottoman Empire with the rest of Palestine, and in the 1596 tax-records it appeared as Dayr an-Nidam, located in the Nahiya of Jabal Quds of the Liwa of Al-Quds. The population was 4 households, all Muslim. They paid a fixed tax rate of 25% on agricultural products, which included wheat, barley, olive trees, vineyards and fruit trees, goats and beehives in addition to "occasional revenues"; a total of 1200 akçe. Sherds from the early Ottoman era has also been found here.

In 1863 Victor Guérin visited and described it as being half ruined and inhabited only by a hundred fellahin. Several cisterns, partially filled, and a number of antique stones, scattered on the ground or reused, proved to him that it had succeeded a former locality. An Ottoman village list from about 1870 found that the village had a population of 59, in a total of 17 houses, though the population count included men, only.

In 1882, the PEF's Survey of Western Palestine (SWP) described it: "A small hamlet on a high point, with olives round it. It is just above the ruins of Tibneh, and water is obtained from the 'Ain Tibneh."

In 1896 the population of Der en-nizam was estimated to be about 147 persons.

=== British era ===
In the 1922 census of Palestine conducted by the British Mandate authorities, Deir Nidham (Dair Inzam) had a population of 106 Muslims. increasing in the 1931 census when Deir Nizam had 166 Muslims in 34 houses.

In the 1945 statistics the population was 190 Muslims, while the total land area was 1,938 dunams, according to an official land and population survey. Of this, 514 were plantations and irrigable land, 483 for cereals, while 31 dunams were classified as built-up areas.

=== Jordanian era ===
In the wake of the 1948 Arab–Israeli War, and after the 1949 Armistice Agreements, Deir Nidham came under Jordanian rule.

The Jordanian census of 1961 found 267 inhabitants.

=== 1967-present ===
Since the Six-Day War in 1967, Deir Nidham has been under Israeli occupation. The population in the 1967 census conducted by the Israeli authorities was 216.

After the 1995 accords, 4.7% of village land is defined as Area B land, while the remaining 95.3 is defined as Area C. In 1997 Israel confiscated 604 dunums of village land for the Israeli settlement of Halamish.

A secondary school exists in Deir Nidham and high school students are educated at a nearby village. Most university students attend Birzeit University or the al-Quds Open University. The electricity network in the village is affiliated with that of Jerusalem, while its water network is managed by the Palestinian National Authority. A village council of seven members was established in 2005 to govern the village.

== Demography ==
=== Local origins ===
Deir Nidham is inhabited by members of the Tamimi clan, who migrated there from Hebron.

== Bibliography ==
- Barron, J.B., ed. (1923). Palestine: Report and General Abstracts of the Census of 1922. Government of Palestine.
- Conder, C.R.; Kitchener, H.H. (1882). The Survey of Western Palestine: Memoirs of the Topography, Orography, Hydrography, and Archaeology. Vol. 2. London: Committee of the Palestine Exploration Fund.
- Finkelstein, I.; Lederman, Zvi, eds. (1997). Highlands of many cultures. Tel Aviv: Institute of Archaeology of Tel Aviv University Publications Section. ISBN 965-440-007-3.
- Government of Jordan, Department of Statistics (1964). First Census of Population and Housing. Volume I: Final Tables; General Characteristics of the Population (PDF).
- Government of Palestine, Department of Statistics (1945). Village Statistics, April, 1945.
- Guérin, V. (1875). Description Géographique Historique et Archéologique de la Palestine (in French). Vol. 2: Samarie, pt. 2. Paris: L'Imprimerie Nationale.
- Hadawi, S. (1970). Village Statistics of 1945: A Classification of Land and Area ownership in Palestine. Palestine Liberation Organization Research Center.
- Hartmann, M. (1883). "Die Ortschaftenliste des Liwa Jerusalem in dem türkischen Staatskalender für Syrien auf das Jahr 1288 der Flucht (1871)". Zeitschrift des Deutschen Palästina-Vereins. 6: 102–149.
- Hütteroth, W.-D.; Abdulfattah, K. (1977). Historical Geography of Palestine, Transjordan and Southern Syria in the Late 16th Century. Erlanger Geographische Arbeiten, Sonderband 5. Erlangen, Germany: Vorstand der Fränkischen Geographischen Gesellschaft. ISBN 3-920405-41-2.
- Mills, E., ed. (1932). Census of Palestine 1931. Population of Villages, Towns and Administrative Areas. Jerusalem: Government of Palestine.
- Palmer, E.H. (1881). The Survey of Western Palestine: Arabic and English Name Lists Collected During the Survey by Lieutenants Conder and Kitchener, R. E. Transliterated and Explained by E.H. Palmer. Committee of the Palestine Exploration Fund.
- Robinson, E.; Smith, E. (1841). Biblical Researches in Palestine, Mount Sinai and Arabia Petraea: A Journal of Travels in the year 1838. Vol. 3. Boston: Crocker & Brewster.
- Schick, C. (1896). "Zur Einwohnerzahl des Bezirks Jerusalem". Zeitschrift des Deutschen Palästina-Vereins. 19: 120–127.
- Socin, A. (1879). "Alphabetisches Verzeichniss von Ortschaften des Paschalik Jerusalem". Zeitschrift des Deutschen Palästina-Vereins. 2: 135–163.
