= Deir Qaddis =

- Municipality type D (Village council)

Arabic transcription(s)
  - Arabic: دير قديس
  - Latin: Deir Qiddis (official); Dayr Qaddis (unofficial)
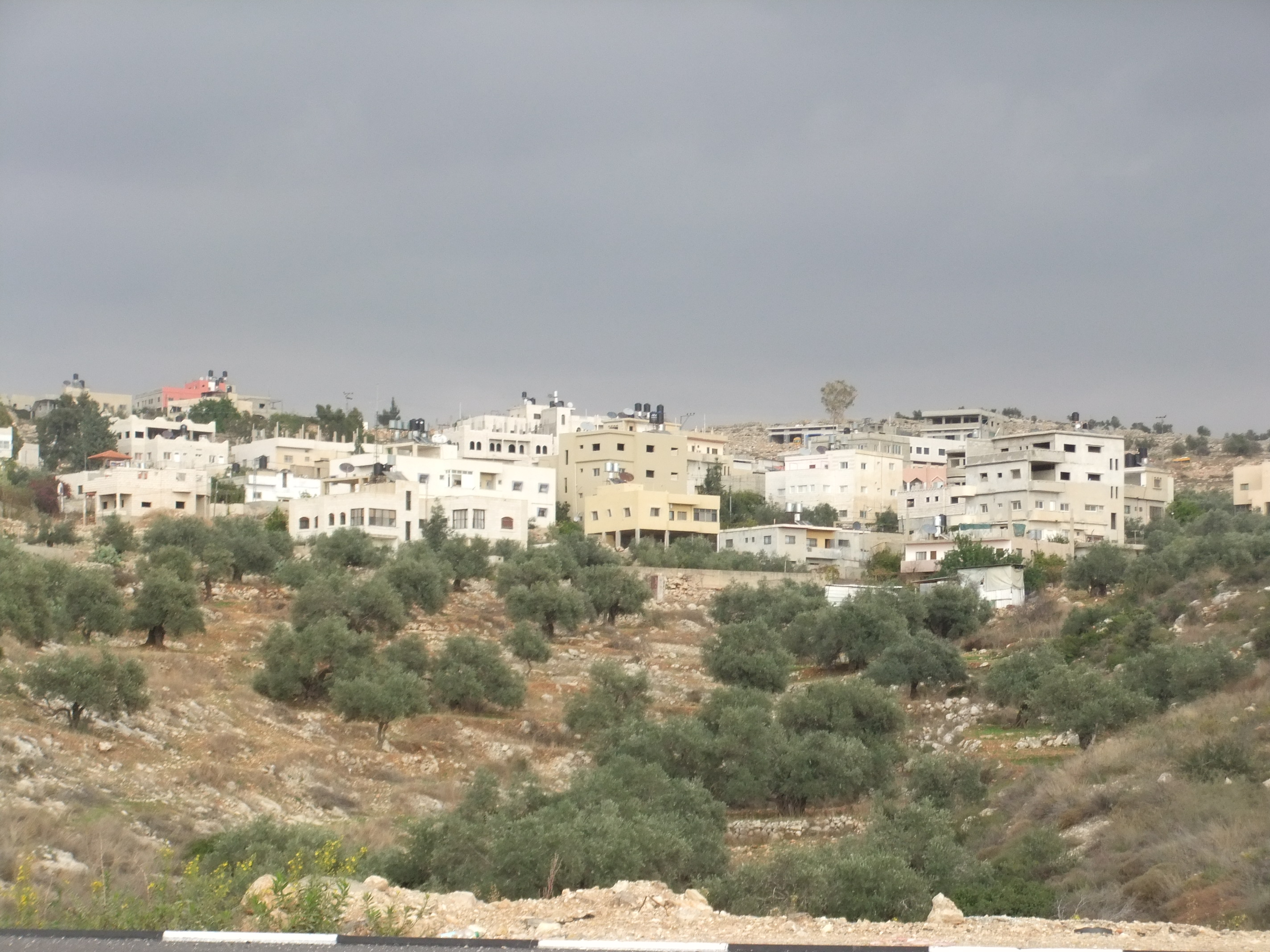
- View of Deir Qaddis

- Location of Deir Qaddis within Palestine
- Coordinates: 31°56′58″N 35°02′44″E
- Palestine grid: 154/150
- State: State of Palestine
- Governorate: Ramallah and al-Bireh

Government
  - Type: Village council
  - Head of Municipality: Fares Ibrahim

Area
  - Total: 8.2 km^{2} (3.2 sq mi)
- Elevation: 372 m (1,220 ft)

Population (2017)
  - Total: 2,452
  - Density: 300/km^{2} (770/sq mi)
- Name meaning: "Monastery of the saint"

Deir Qaddis (Arabic: دير قديس) is a Palestinian town in the Ramallah and al-Bireh Governorate of the State of Palestine, in the central West Bank, located sixteen kilometers west of Ramallah. According to the Palestinian Central Bureau of Statistics, the town had a population of 2,452 inhabitants in 2017. The town consists of 8,207 dunams, of which 438 dunams are classified as built-up area. As a result of 1995 accords, 7.7% of Deir Qaddis' land was transferred to the Palestinian National Authority for civil affairs, so-called Area B, but Israel still retains full control of 92.3% of the town, being in Area C.

== Location ==
Deir Qaddis is located 15.7 kilometers (9.8 mi) north-west of Ramallah. It is bordered by Kharbatha Bani Harith and Al-Itihad to the east, Shibtin to the north, Ni’lin to the west, and Bil’in to the south.

== Etymology ==
In the 19th century, the name Deir Qaddis was interpreted to mean "monastery of the saint". Qaddis means a holy person and is of Aramaic origin.

== History ==
French explorer Victor Guérin found remains of houses built with large blocks and several cisterns dug into the rock, while SWP (1882) notes a ruined monastery and a nearby cave. According to SWP the name of the village indicated that a convent had existed there.

A survey by Finkelstein and Lederman uncovered no ancient pottery.

=== Ottoman era ===
The village was incorporated into the Ottoman Empire in 1517 with all of Palestine, and in 1596 it appeared in the tax registers as Dayr Qiddis in the Nahiya of Ramlah of the Liwa of Gazza. It had a population of 11 households, all Muslim, and paid taxes on wheat, barley, summer crops, olive- and fruit trees, goats and beehives, and a press for olives or grapes; a total of 5,400 akçe. In 1838 Deir el-Kaddis was described as a village in the Beni Hasan area west of Jerusalem.

In 1863 Guérin estimated that Deir Kaddis had about 350 inhabitants, while an Ottoman village list from 1870 showed Der Kaddis had 36 houses and a population of 112, a count that included only men.

In 1883, the PEF's Survey of Western Palestine described Deir el Kuddis as a "small hamlet on a high hill-top, with gardens to the north [..] There is a well on the east."

=== British Mandate era ===
In the 1922 census of Palestine, conducted by the British Mandate authorities, Deir Qaddis had a population of 299 inhabitants, all Muslims, increasing in the 1931 census to a population of 368 Muslims in 82 houses.

In the 1945 statistics, the population of Deir Qaddis was 440 Muslims, with 8,224 dunams of land, according to an official land and population survey. 1,815 dunams were used for plantations and irrigable land, 1,069 dunams for cereals, while 8 dunams were built-up (urban) land.

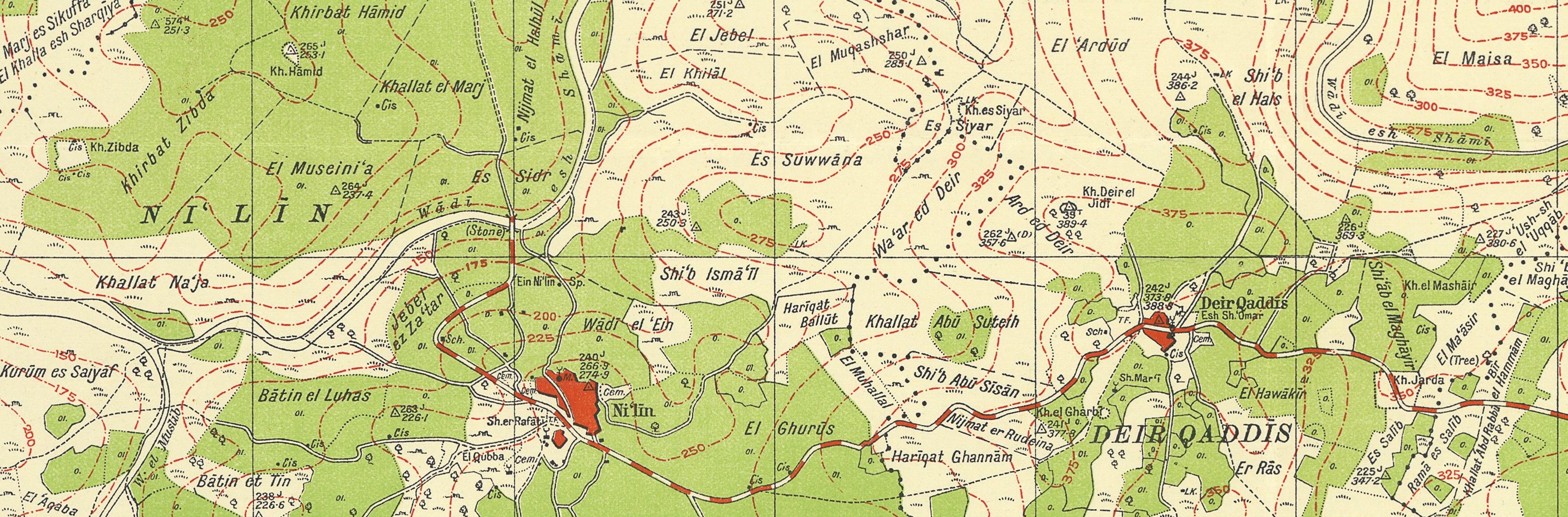
Deir Qaddis 1944 1:20,000

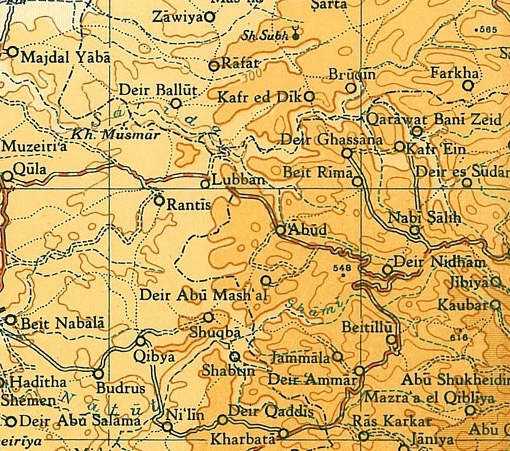
Deir Qaddis 1945 1:250,000

=== Jordanian era ===
In the wake of the 1948 Arab–Israeli War, Deir Qaddis came under Jordanian rule.

The Jordanian census of 1961 found 752 inhabitants in Deir Qaddis.

=== Post-1967 ===
Deir Qaddis came under Israeli occupation during the 1967 Six-Day War. The population in the 1967 census conducted by the Israeli authorities was 461, 25 of whom originated from the Israeli territory.

After the 1995 accords, 7.7% of the village's total area has been classified as Area B land, while the remaining 93.3% is Area C.

According to ARIJ, Israel built three Israeli settlements on the village lands: 1818 dunams for Modi'in Illit, 446 dunams for Nili, 471 dunams for Na'ale.

In 2008, access to some of the village land was cut off by the Israeli West Bank barrier. Access was restored in 2012.

The town's prominent families are Husain, Qattosa, Nasser, Abu Zeid, Hamada, Awadh, Abu Laban and Kreish.

A female IDF soldier was lightly injured in a car ramming attack in the vicinity of Deir Qaddis. The attacker was shot and critically injured by soldiers.

== Bibliography ==
- Barron, J.B., ed. (1923). Palestine: Report and General Abstracts of the Census of 1922. Government of Palestine.
- Conder, C.R.; Kitchener, H.H. (1882). The Survey of Western Palestine: Memoirs of the Topography, Orography, Hydrography, and Archaeology. Vol. 2. London: Committee of the Palestine Exploration Fund.
- Finkelstein, I.; Lederman, Zvi, eds. (1997). Highlands of many cultures. Tel Aviv: Institute of Archaeology of Tel Aviv University Publications Section. ISBN 965-440-007-3.
- Government of Jordan, Department of Statistics (1964). First Census of Population and Housing. Volume I: Final Tables; General Characteristics of the Population (PDF).
- Government of Palestine, Department of Statistics (1945). Village Statistics, April, 1945.
- Guérin, V. (1875). Description Géographique Historique et Archéologique de la Palestine (in French). Vol. 2: Samarie, pt. 2. Paris: L'Imprimerie Nationale.
- Hadawi, S. (1970). Village Statistics of 1945: A Classification of Land and Area ownership in Palestine. Palestine Liberation Organization Research Center.
- Hartmann, M. (1883). "Die Ortschaftenliste des Liwa Jerusalem in dem türkischen Staatskalender für Syrien auf das Jahr 1288 der Flucht (1871)". Zeitschrift des Deutschen Palästina-Vereins. 6: 102–149.
- Hütteroth, W.-D.; Abdulfattah, K. (1977). Historical Geography of Palestine, Transjordan and Southern Syria in the Late 16th Century. Erlanger Geographische Arbeiten, Sonderband 5. Erlangen, Germany: Vorstand der Fränkischen Geographischen Gesellschaft. ISBN 3-920405-41-2.
- Mills, E., ed. (1932). Census of Palestine 1931. Population of Villages, Towns and Administrative Areas. Jerusalem: Government of Palestine.
- Palmer, E.H. (1881). The Survey of Western Palestine: Arabic and English Name Lists Collected During the Survey by Lieutenants Conder and Kitchener, R. E. Transliterated and Explained by E.H. Palmer. Committee of the Palestine Exploration Fund.
- Robinson, E.; Smith, E. (1841). Biblical Researches in Palestine, Mount Sinai and Arabia Petraea: A Journal of Travels in the year 1838. Vol. 2. Boston: Crocker & Brewster.
- Robinson, E.; Smith, E. (1841). Biblical Researches in Palestine, Mount Sinai and Arabia Petraea: A Journal of Travels in the year 1838. Vol. 3. Boston: Crocker & Brewster.
- Socin, A. (1879). "Alphabetisches Verzeichniss von Ortschaften des Paschalik Jerusalem". Zeitschrift des Deutschen Palästina-Vereins. 2: 135–163.
