= Municipality (Palestine) =

Administrative unit of local government similar to a city

A municipality (Arabic: مجلس بلدي) is an administrative unit of local government similar to a city. They were established and decided after the creation of the Local Government Ministry of the Palestinian National Authority in 1994. All municipalities are assigned by the Local Government Ministry. Municipal council members and mayors are elected by the residents of the particular locality. Municipalities are divided into four sectors depending on their population and importance to their particular governorate.

== Municipal types ==
Type	Count	Description	Administration
Municipality A City	14	Primary municipalities or district capitals of the governorates. These localities are considered cities.	Their municipal councils consists of 13 members and a chairman in addition to the elected mayor.
Municipality B City or Town	41	Municipalities that have populations of over 8,000 inhabitants or have had a lengthy existence as local councils under Israeli administration.	Their municipal councils consist of 13 members and a chairperson.
Municipality C Town	47	Municipalities that have populations of 4,000-8,000. Most were recently approved by the Palestinian National Authority.	Governed by 11-member councils.
Municipality D Village	220	Municipalities with populations of over 1,000.	Governed by 9-member councils.
	322		

== See also ==
- List of cities in Palestine
- Palestinian refugee camps
