= Israeli expropriation of Palestinian springs in the West Bank =

Expropriation of springs in the Israeli-occupied West Bank

Israel, the Israeli water company Mekorot, and Israeli settlers have expropriated springs in the Israeli-occupied West Bank by Israel. The springs and wells, to which Palestinians have a human right in international law, are appropriated exclusively for use by Israelis and visiting tourists.

== Nomenclature ==
The topographical feature of a spring in semitic languages, and specifically in both Arabic: (عين) and Hebrew: (עַיִן), variously transliterated as ayn, en, ein, also means "eye" (socket), a spring in the arid terrain of the Middle East being naturally understood to be a kind of "eye of the landscape". Given their importance, many toponyms in Palestine incorporate the word in terms for towns and localities. (Note: As opposed to natural springs, a dug well, in Arabic بئر (bir) and in Hebrew ראֵבְּ (be'er) as in Beersheba, the "well of seven" (Freund 2009, p. 319).)

== Background ==
The groundwater resources on which Israel depends draw on 3 aquifers, only one of which is in Israel and of the recharge area of the water tables only 5% lies in Israel. The West Bank's resources are either surface run-off channelled in streams and rivers or groundwater and the population down to the 1980s had not been allowed to access more than 14-18% of the total water available. Israel's perceived and programmed water security depends on minimizing Palestinian use of the aquifers in their own territory of the West Bank.

Historically, spring water had always been managed by villages adjacent to springs, which lay within their boundaries. The earlier British mandatory authority had difficulties formulating a water law given the diversity of regional practices, and all efforts by them to do so failed. In that period, however, the Zionist leadership often argued its case for increasing Jewish immigration by asserting that efficient modern techniques of water management would ensure a limitless capacity for absorbing these immigrants: water, they argued, was abundant, all that was lacking was expertise in developing modern infrastructure. The future Israeli water company Mekorot was set up in 1937 to this end. However, with the establishment of the state of Israel, the range estimates for available water resources in Palestine were scaled back significantly, and the imagined abundance was replaced by a recognition of water scarcity. Israel centralized and nationalized its water resources in 1959.

Until 1950, when Jordan claimed the West Bank by annexation – a move not recognized by the international community – most Palestinian villages drew the majority of their water from springs and by collecting rainwater. In the wake of the 1948 Palestine war, the inhabitants of the historic core of Jerusalem and its eastern neighbourhoods had lost access to the Ras al-'Ayn and 'Arrub springs, and, until pumping station facilities were repaired, the severities of rationing were eased by drawing on the springs in Silwan and Sur Bahir. (Note: The source fails to clarify why the Arrub springs, which remained under Jordanian control, could no longer be exploited to serve the city. Traditionally Jerusalem could also rely on a well at bir Arrub further down the valley (Dumper 1997, pp. 131, 135).)

The springs had traditionally been managed by a communal property regime. Irrigated agriculture in villages mainly depended on these springs. Improved technology allowed wells to be dug in the ensuing decade. Villagers pooled funds in order to create "well companies" in order to secure finance for drilling. Jordan set up a Jerusalem Water Utility in the mid-1960s, but it serviced only the three cities of Bethlehem, Jerusalem and Ramallah. This project stopped when Israel conquered and occupied the West Bank in 1967. (Note: On the eve of the war, consumption of water in the Jewish sector of West Jerusalem was 36,000 cubic metres as compared to 2,000 cubic metres for the inhabitants of the Jordanian-controlled sector to the east who, in per capita terms, had access to 21% of the water available west of the Green Line (Dumper 1997, p. 135).)

Israel thereafter did not extend its water laws to the captured territories, which were run by a military administration. That authority quickly issued Military Order no. 92 investing a military officer with all powers regarding the management of water resources in what became the Palestinian territories. Military Order no. 158 later stipulated that wells could be drilled only after obtaining a military permit, and, over the ensuing 23 years, only twenty three such permits were issued. (Note: Lowi however wrote in 1995: "No Palestinian individual or villager has received permission to drill a new well for agricultural purposes since July 1967, nor repair one that is close to an Israeli well. Sinking wells on the mountain ridge, the location of the Yarkon-Taninim Aquifer, is strictly forbidden. Occasionally, permission is granted for the drilling of wells destined for domestic use." (Lowi 1995, p. 187)) Springs waters, however, were rarely touched, and the existing regime allowing villages to continue with their property management regarding the use of such resources.

The minimum mean for daily per capita water consumption set by WHO is 100 litres per day: the average in the West Bank is 66 litres. The state-owned Israeli company Mekorot taps springs and drills wells in the West Bank and furnishes settlements with water for all purposes, industrial, agricultural and domestic. It also sells some to Palestinian water utilities, according to schedules Israeli authorities determine to fix the allowable amount. For many villagers whose access to local sources is severely restricted, the result is that they must often purchase trucked-in water priced much higher than that supplied to settlements, (Note: $6-10US per cubic metre) and in the poorest communities the monthly outlay for imported water can rise to half of a family income.

== Settlement usurpations of springs after 1967 ==
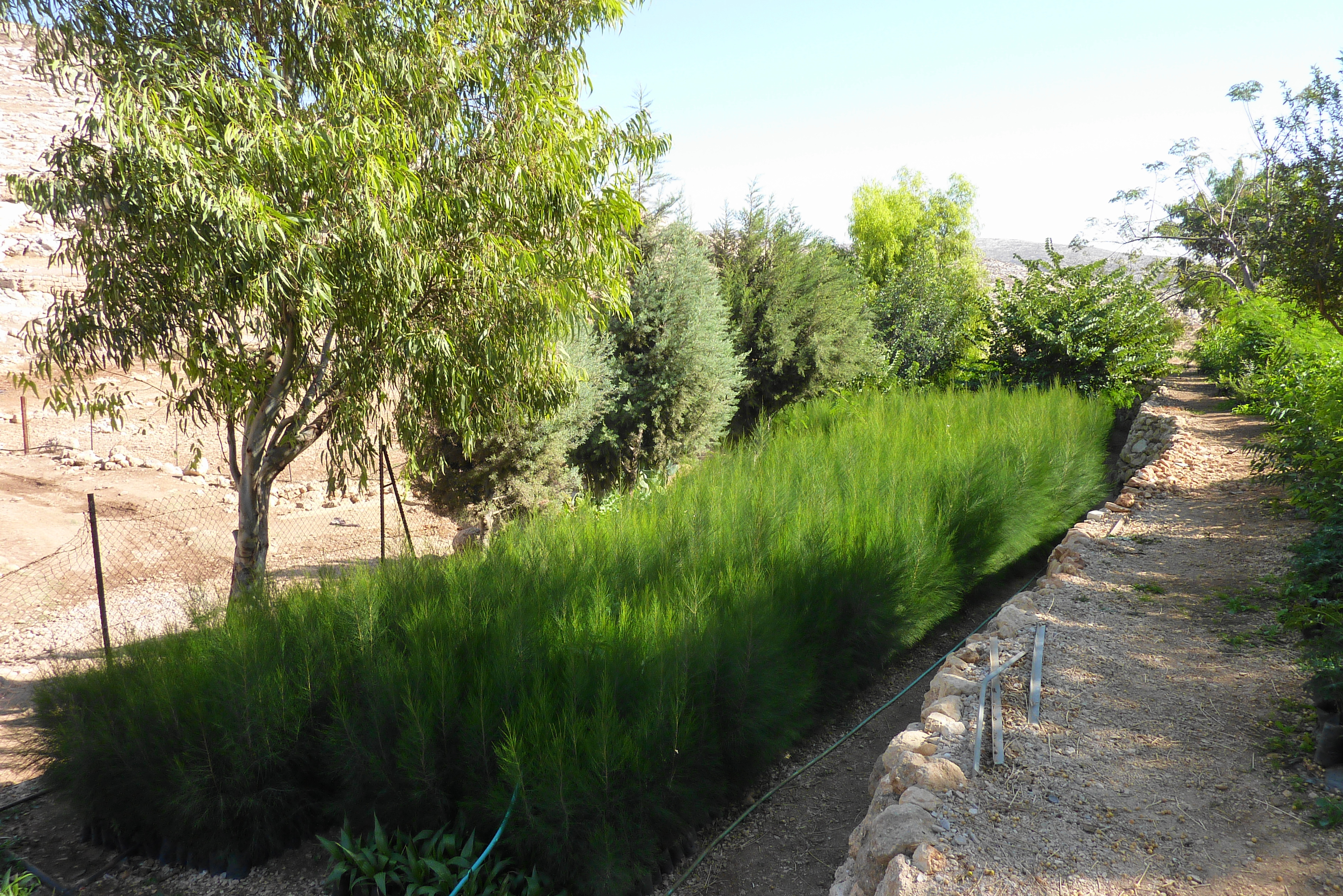
Oasis of Ain Samia, just east of Kafr Malik

At least 300 springs exist in the West Bank. In the process of establishing Israeli settlements, many of these springs were targeted by the settlers, and the struggle to wrest possession of the areas of the landscape that feature them was, and remains, a notable source of conflict between local Palestinians and the immigrant Jewish communities. In a survey conducted in 2011, the United Nations' Office for the Coordination of Humanitarian Affairs occupied Palestinian territory identified 56 springs that had either been taken over by settlers (30), or were the object of targeting for eventual inclusion into the settlement areas (26). 93% of these were in Area C, on parcels of land that, according to the records of the Israeli Civil Administration, in large part (84%) are registered as private Palestinian property. (Note: "Analysis done by the anti-occupation Kerem Navot organization shows that since the Oslo accords were signed, these councils have been operating in roughly 550,000 acres (220,000 ha)s lying in the West Bank's Area C, comprising almost 40 percent of the entire area of the West Bank. However, more than 225,000 acres (91,000 ha) of these are closed military areas, while another 70,000 acres (28,000 ha) are privately-owned Palestinian lands." (Berger 2019))

One technique relies on the practice by the IDF of declaring large areas of West Bank land military fire zones where (Palestinian) civilians may not enter. The six settler Regional Councils in the West Bank are supposed to operate under a military ordinance regulating their activities within defined municipal boundaries, but, according to Haaretz's Yotam Berger the civil/military administration turns a blind eye to the phenomenon or even encourages the settler groups to develop infrastructure on lands beyond their municipal jurisdiction that are otherwise closed military zones or private Palestinian property.

Many of the sequestered springs are designated as Israeli parks, in a broader process of what has been called "colonial ecologism", or "apartheid springs."

== Springs seized for settlements (by 2011) ==
The following is a list of 30 springs that had fallen under the complete control of Israeli settlements by 2011.

Spring name	Palestinian village	Israeli settlement/outpost	hebraicized name
Ein el-Azkut	Bardala (Note: A farmer in the nearby village of Ein al-Beida is reported as having seen over the last 2 and a half decades "the local spring gradually dry up after the Israeli company Mekorot drilled two wells near the neighbouring Palestinian community of Bardala, to serve Mehola, an Israeli settlement. The amount of water the Israeli authorities allocate to the village has been decreasing over the years, he says, and has been fully cut off on numerous occasions. Despite an agreement to compensate the Palestinian villages of Bardala and Ein al-Beida, since the mid-1970s, Israel has significantly reduced the amount of water available to both communities." (Lein 2000, pp. 30–31, Amnesty International 2017))	Jordan Valley Regional Council	Ein Sukot
Ein Um Al Jarah	Awarta	Itamar	Ein Nerya
Ein El Mukheimer	Al-Lubban ash-Sharqiya	Eli	N/A
Ein El Michna	Burin	Har Brakha	Ein Yosef/Ein Amasa
Ein El Jneinah	Burin	Yitzhar	Ein Magnunim
Ein El Sha'ara	Burin	Yitzhar	N/A
Ein El Kbireh	Deir al-Hatab	Elon Moreh	Ein Kfir
Ein El Ariq	Qaryut	Eli	Ein Hagvura
Ein Ad Dweer	Al Jib	Giv'at Ze'ev	Ein Dvir
Al Uyoon	An-Nabi Samwil	Samuel National Park	N/A
Ein El-Balad	An-Nabi Samwil	Samuel National Park	Ein Tiltan
Ein Um Ntukh	Al-Mazra'a al-Qibliya	Nahliel Nerya	N/A
Ein Al Marj	Bayt Nuba	Canada Park	Beit Hakshatot
Ein Khaled	An Nabi Salih	Halamish	
Ein Al Qaws	An Nabi Salih	Halamish	Ein Meir
Ein Husein	Ein Yabrud	Beit El	N/A
Ein Addallah	Ein Yabrud	Beit El	N/A
Ein Issa	Al Bireh	Beit El	N/A
Ein El Masraj	Al-Janiya	Talmon	Ein Talmon
Ein El Mallah	Al-Janiya	Talmon	N/A
Ein El Thahra	Al Bireh	Beit El	N/A
Ein Ash Shunnar	Beitilu	Nahliel	N/A
Ein El Butmeh	Ras Karkar	Talmon Zait Raanan	N/A
Ein al-Sajma (Note: This spring is on private Palestinian land (Berger 2019).)	Khallet al Baluta	Bat Ayin	Ein Yitzhak
Ein Abu Zaid	Nahalin	Rosh Tzurim	Ein Tzurim
Ein El Abhara	Jab'a	Bat Ayin	Ein Livne
Ein Ras al 'Idd	al-Khader	Efrat	Ein Ha'ama
Ein Hubileh	Khirbet Safa	Bat Ayin	Ein Hunile
Ein Abu Kleibeh	Nahalin	Havot Eyalin	Ein Misla
Uyoon al Beid	Yatta	Avigayil	Beseter Ha-har

== Springs at risk by 2011 ==
The following is a list of Palestinian springs that were considered by United Nations investigators to be at risk of a settler takeover in 2011.

Spring name	Palestinian village	Israeli settlement/outpost	Settler development
Ein Shu'al El Bir	Beit Furiq	Itamar outposts	No
Ein Jheir	Majdal Bani Fadil	Ma'ale Efrayim	Yes
Ein Fasyil	Duma	Petza'el	Yes
Ein Al Majur	Qarawat Bani Hassan	Havot Yair	Yes
Ein El Nwetef	Qarawat Bani Hassan	Havot Yair	Yes
Ein Dura	Dura al-Qar'a	Beit El	Yes
Ein Al Uja	Khirbet El Uja	Yitav/Omer Ranch	Yes
Ein El Majur	Deir Ibzi	Dolev	No
Ein Al Raya	An Nabi Salih	Halamish/Neve Tzuf	No
Ein Az Zarir	'Atara	Ateret	Yes
Ein Sheban	Al Bireh	Binyamin(?)	Yes
Ein Az Zama'a	Beitilu	Halamish	Yes
Uyoon Wadi Az Zarqa	Beitilu	Nahliel	Yes
Ein Al Loz	Ras Karkar	Talmon Neria	No
Ein Ash Shuneh	Ras Karkar	Talmon/Zait Raanan	Yes
Uyoon El Haramiyeh	Silwad	Biyamin?	Yes
Ein Al Aliya'a	Deir Dibwan	Ofra	Yes
Ein Al Hakam	Aboud	Beit Aryeh-Ofarim	No
Ein Samya	Ein Samiya	Kokhav HaShahar	Yes
Ein Al Harasha	Al-Mazra'a al-Qibliya	Harasha/ Talmon	Yes
Ein Al Marsal	Ramallah	Dolev	No
Ein Bubin	Deir Ibzi	Dolev	Yes
Ein Ar Rashah	Al-Mughayyir	Shilo outpost	Yes
Wadi Fuqin/Ein At Tina	Wadi Fukin	Beitar Illit	No
Ein Al Qasis	al-Khader	Neve Daniel	No
Ein Al Hilwe	Ain al-Hilweh	Maskiot	No

== 2012-2020 ==
The West Bank Ein Hanya spring, which from Ottoman times down to the end of the British Mandate was recognized as the property of al-Walaja, now lies within the municipal boundaries of Jerusalem, and the inhabitants of the village are cut off from it by Israeli West Bank barrier. It was frequented by Israelis and Palestinians. Problems started when it was designated as a tourist attraction and enclosed within what Israel calls one of its national parks, the Emek Refaim Park. The opening was delayed for two years as police, together with the Jerusalem Municipality and the Nature and Parks Authority, insisted that Palestinians be refused entry, and that the government shift the Ein Yael checkpoint south in order to block Palestinian access, an operation that would cost $3.4 million. It was opened to Jews for three days during the Sukkot festival, which coincided with the Palestinian olive picking season but Palestinians, even those wishing to harvest the fruits of their olive groves, are denied access, (Note: "'When we arrived here there was an old man sitting under his fig tree, and shepherds would come to water their flocks – the place was enchanted. It was like a focal point of activities in the area. Our intention was to tidy it up a bit and then leave, as if we'd never been here', recalls landscape architect Iris Tal, who was charged with upgrading the area surrounding Ein Hanya, the second-largest spring in the Judean Hills... After 3,000 years in which the spring was open to and frequented by local Jews, Christians and Muslims, the Jerusalem Municipality is planning to set up a roadblock nearby which will prevent thousands of residents from the adjacent Palestinian villages of al-Walaja and Battir and environs from reaching the site." (Riba 2018)) a ban extending also to the inhabitants of al-Walaja itself, who own 297 acres (120 ha) of the area.

Spring name	Palestinian village	Israeli settlement/outpost	hebraicized name
?	?	Mateh Binyamin Regional Council	Ein Oz
Ein al-Major	Ein Qiniya	Dolev	Ein Mazor
?	Fasayil	Petza'el and Herod's Pool	

== Incidents ==
Israeli settlements are considered illegal under international law, something Israel disputes, and over 600,000 Jews have come to live in roughly 140 of such settlements since Israel occupied the area militarily in 1967. Springs in particular are flashpoints in the conflict between Israelis who come to settle in the West Bank and the local Palestinian villagers, (Note: "Springs on the West Bank have become flash points between Palestinians who bathe or water their flocks in them and Israeli settlers who have increasingly sought to prevent them from doing so. A 2012 United Nations report identified 30 springs that had been completely 'taken over' by settlers and another 26, including Ein Bubin, that were 'at risk' of takeover, whether by frequent tourism or by the presence of armed patrols seen as intimidating to Palestinians." (Halbfinger 2019)) with, according to Dror Ektes, over 60 springs so far seized in the past 10 years, and thereupon reserved for Israeli use only. (Note: "According to Dror Etkes, the founder of Kerem Navot, an organization that studies Israeli land policy in the West Bank, there are today more than 60 springs in the central West Bank that settlers coveted and seized as part of a project of plunder that began 10 years ago. The landscaping and renovation work at about half of them has been completed, the dispossession made absolute, the Palestinians blocked from even approaching the springs and their lands. Other springs targeted by the settlers are in various stages of takeover (Levy & Levac 2019).)

According to Amira Hass, the site is one of nine in an area where, over three decades, the settlements of Dolev and Nahliel, and illegal Israeli outposts between them, have seized control over some 3,700 acres (1,500 ha) of Palestinian land. Palestinians in six adjacent villages, Kobar, Ras Karkar, Al-Janiya, Deir 'Ammar, Al-Mazra'a al-Qibliya and Beitillu – all cut off from each other through prohibitions on road use – have been denied access to their groves, springs and grazing land by a variety of settler and army measures – vandalism of trees, military orders, and assaults.

Five of the villages' nine springs have, she claims, been appropriated from Palestinians, who formerly used them for swimming, picnicking and for agricultural purposes. The seizures adapt them as recreational sites exclusively for settlers and touring Israeli Jews. The loss of land and water resources has, she continues, dealt an economic blow to inhabitants of the six villages, causing many families to rely now on aid. With regard to the incident specifically Hass concluded that, "those who prepared the bomb certainly know that this is Israel's strategy in the West Bank. Individual settlements are turned into broad blocs, for Jews only, and are boasting of abundance, serenity, commercial centers, vineyards, orchards, hiking trails and Judaized natural springs."

In June 2026, a spring owned by a Palestinian farmer in Fasayil was seized by Israeli settlers from a nearby settlement and the water irrigation system for his agriculture was destroyed, leaving him without water supply. The water was siphoned by the settlers into the archeological site Herod's Pool. Despite the acknowledgment of his ownership of the spring by Israeli civil administration, Finance Minister Bezalel Smotrich announced 3 million shekels would be invested into developing the pool for public and tourism.

== See also ==
- Wadi Qana

== Sources ==
- Amnesty International (2009). "The Occupation of Water" (PDF). Amnesty International.
- Amnesty International (29 November 2017). "Troubled Water– Palestinians denied fair access to water". Amnesty International.
- Berger, Yotam (31 May 2019). "Israeli Settlers 'Upgrade' West Bank Springs to Usurp Palestinian Land". Haaretz.
- Daghara, Azza; Al-Khatib, Issam A.; Al-Jabari, Maher (23 June 2019). "Quality of Drinking Water from Springs in Palestine: West Bank as a Case Study" (PDF). Journal of Environmental and Public Health. 2019: 1–7. doi:10.1155/2019/8631732. ISBN 978-0-521-55836-5. PMC 6612393. PMID 31341486.
- Dumper, Michael (1997). The Politics of Jerusalem Since 1967. Columbia University Press. ISBN 978-0-585-38871-7.
- Forat, Umm (31 January 2020). "I Went for a Run and Saw Settlers Took Over a Spring Near a Palestinian Village". Haaretz. Archived from the original on 31 January 2020.
- Freund, Richard A. (2009). Digging Through the Bible: Modern Archaeology and the Ancient Bible. Rowman & Littlefield. ISBN 978-0-742-54645-5.
- Gorney, Edna (2016). "Roots of Identity, Canopy of Collision: Re-Visioning Trees as an Evolving National Symbol Within the Israeli -Palestinian Conflict". In de Melo, Cristina Joanaz; Vaz, Estelita; Costa Pinto, Lígia M. (eds.). Environmental History in the Making: Volume II: Acting. Springer. pp. 327–343. ISBN 978-3-319-41139-2.
- Halbfinger, David M. (23 August 2019). "Bomb Kills Israeli Girl, 17, at a West Bank Oasis". The New York Times.
- Hass, Amira (26 August 2019). "The Tragic Hike That Has Nothing to Do With the Landscape and Land". Haaretz.
- Hasson, Nir (15 October 2019). "Jerusalem Reopens Natural Spring, but Not to Palestinians". Haaretz.
- "How Dispossession Happens: The Humanitarian Impact of the Takeover of Palestinian Water Springs by Israeli Settlers" (PDF). Office for the Coordination of Humanitarian Affairs occupied Palestinian territory. March 2012.
- "Israeli teenage girl killed in West Bank bomb attack". BBC News. 23 August 2019.
- Lein, Yehezkel (July 2000). "Thirsty for a Solution: The Water Crisis in the Occupied Territories and its Resolution in the Final-Status Agreement". B'Tselem.
- Levy, Gideon; Levac, Alex (30 August 2019). "'This Place Is Only for Jews': The West Bank's Apartheid Springs". Haaretz.
- Lowi, Miriam R. (1995) [First published 1993]. Water and Power: The Politics of a Scarce Resource in the Jordan River Basin. Cambridge University Press. ISBN 978-0-521-55836-5.
- Pearce, Fred (2018). When the Rivers Run Dry: The Global Water Crisis and How to Solve It. Portobello Books. ISBN 978-1-846-27649-1.
- Riba, Naama (16 March 2018). "The Ein Hanya Spring: A Charming, Spruced-up Jerusalem Spot Free of Palestinians". Haaretz.
- Rinat, Zafrir (20 March 2012). "Report: Jewish settlers now control dozens of West Bank springs". Haaretz. Archived from the original on 21 March 2012.
- Rinat, Zafrir (5 April 2012). "Springwater flows in the West Bank, but who controls it?". Haaretz. Archived from the original on 7 April 2012.
- Sharon, Moshe (2004). Corpus Inscriptionum Arabicarum Palaestinae (CIAP): D-F. Vol. 3. BRILL. ISBN 978-9-004-13197-2.
- Sokol, Sam (6 September 2019). "Two Weeks After Surviving Terror Attack, Israeli Teen Becomes A Medic". The Forward.
- Stanley, Arthur Penrhyn (1856). Sinai and Palestine: In Connection with Their History. Vol. 1. London: J. Murray.
- Tatarsky, Aviv (22 October 2019). "How one Palestinian spring became a leisure spot for Israelis". +972 Magazine.
- Trotter, Julie (2013). "Water". In Peters, Joel; Newman, David (eds.). Routledge Handbook on the Israeli-Palestinian Conflict. Routledge. pp. 145–153. ISBN 978-1-136-16069-1.
