= Abu Shukheidim =

- Municipality type C

Arabic transcription(s)
  - Arabic: ابو شخيدم
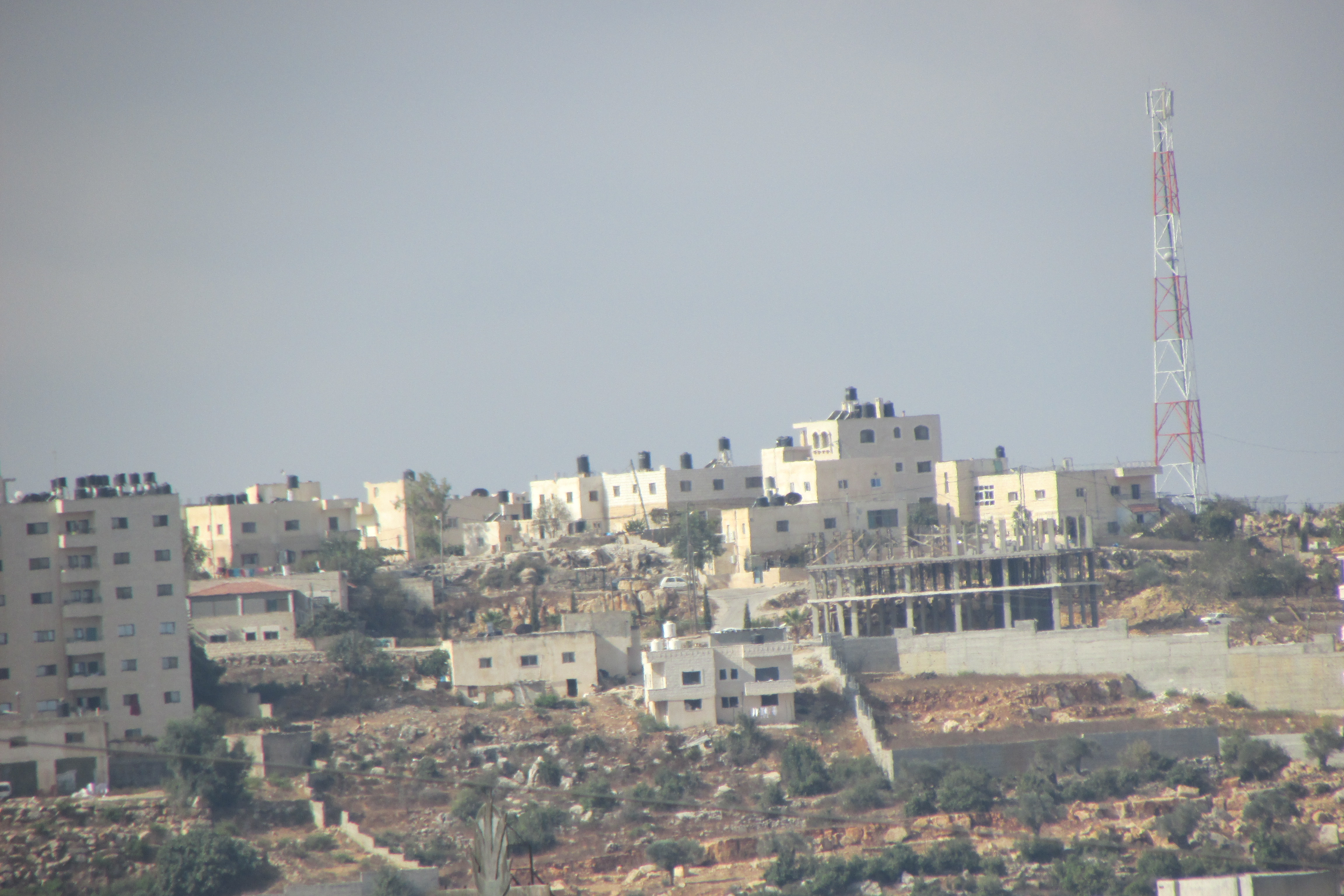
- Northern part of Abu Shukheidim

- Location of Abu Shukheidim within Palestine
- Coordinates: 31°57′53″N 35°10′25″E
- Palestine grid: 166/152
- State: State of Palestine
- Governorate: Ramallah and al-Bireh

Government
  - Type: Municipality
  - Head of Municipality: Abdullah Ladadwa

Area
  - Total: 15.5 km^{2} (6.0 sq mi)

Population (2017)
  - Total: 2,438
  - Density: 157/km^{2} (407/sq mi)
- Name meaning: The father of Shukheidim

Abu Shukheidim (or Abu Shkeidim, Arabic: أبو شخيدم) is a Palestinian village in the Ramallah and al-Bireh Governorate.

In 2005 it merged with the village of Al-Mazra'a al-Qibliya to form the town of Al-Zaitounah.

== History ==
Abu Shukheidim does not appear in records until the 19th century. It appears to have been founded during the period of Ottoman rule in the wake of the Qays–Yaman war.

Pottery sherds from the Hellenistic/Roman, Byzantine, Crusader/Ayyubid and the Mamluk eras have been found here.

=== Ottoman era ===
Sherds from the early Ottoman era has also been found here. The historical core of the village is predominantly uninhabited.

In 1838, it was noted as a Muslim village, Abu Shukheidim, in the Bani Harith district, north of Jerusalem.

In 1863 Victor Guérin found it consisting of a dozen houses. A birket (artificial pond) was lined on the inside with good cement, but needed repairs. Near the birket were several very old buildings. The villagers were compelled to stock up on water at a well located at the bottom of the mountain whose village occupies the summit.

An Ottoman village list of about 1870 showed that Abu Schechedim had 14 houses and a population of 76, though the population count included men, only.

In 1882, the PEF's Survey of Western Palestine described Abu Shukheidim as a village resembling Abu Qash, and supplied by the same well.

In 1896 the population of 'Abu schechedim was estimated to be about 204 persons.

=== British Mandate era ===
In the 1922 census of Palestine, conducted by the British Mandate authorities, the population of Abu Iskhajdam was 139 Muslims, increasing in the 1931 census to 201 Muslims, in 47 houses.

In 1945 statistics Abu Shukheidim had a population of 250 Muslims, and a total land area of 1,430 dunams. Of this, 781 dunams were for plantations and irrigable land, 178 were for cereals, while 23 dunams were built-up areas.

=== Jordanian era ===
In the wake of the 1948 Arab–Israeli War, and after the 1949 Armistice Agreements, Abu Shukheidim came under Jordanian rule.

The Jordanian census of 1961 found 1,358 inhabitants.

=== Post-1967 ===
Since the Six-Day War in 1967, Abu Shukheidim has been under Israeli occupation.

After the 1995 accords, 54.2% of Al-Zaitounah land was defined as Area B, while the remaining 45.8% was defined as Area C. Israel has confiscated 308 dunams of land from Al-Zaitounah in order to construct two Israeli settlements, Talmon and Nahl'iel.

== Population ==
Abu Shukheidim's population in 1922 was estimated at 139 people, and in 1945, 150 people. After an influx of refugees in 1967, the number reached about 5,069 people; in 1987 it became 773 people, and in 1996 the number reached 1,025. The population was 2,438 in 2017.

Most of the village's residents have roots in Deir Dibwan, although the original settlers came from Hebron. There's an old ruin nearby sharing the same name, and a family with the same name in Hebron.

== Bibliography ==
- Barron, J.B., ed. (1923). Palestine: Report and General Abstracts of the Census of 1922. Government of Palestine.
- Conder, C.R.; Kitchener, H.H. (1882). The Survey of Western Palestine: Memoirs of the Topography, Orography, Hydrography, and Archaeology. Vol. 2. London: Committee of the Palestine Exploration Fund.
- Finkelstein, I.; Lederman, Zvi, eds. (1997). Highlands of many cultures. Tel Aviv: Institute of Archaeology of Tel Aviv University Publications Section. ISBN 965-440-007-3.
- Government of Jordan, Department of Statistics (1964). First Census of Population and Housing. Volume I: Final Tables; General Characteristics of the Population (PDF).
- Government of Palestine, Department of Statistics (1945). Village Statistics, April, 1945.
- Guérin, V. (1869). Description Géographique Historique et Archéologique de la Palestine (in French). Vol. 1: Judee, pt. 3. Paris: L'Imprimerie Nationale.
- Hadawi, S. (1970). Village Statistics of 1945: A Classification of Land and Area ownership in Palestine. Palestine Liberation Organization Research Center. Archived from the original on 2018-12-08.
- Hartmann, M. (1883). "Die Ortschaftenliste des Liwa Jerusalem in dem türkischen Staatskalender für Syrien auf das Jahr 1288 der Flucht (1871)". Zeitschrift des Deutschen Palästina-Vereins. 6: 102–149.
- Mills, E., ed. (1932). Census of Palestine 1931. Population of Villages, Towns and Administrative Areas. Jerusalem: Government of Palestine.
- Palmer, E.H. (1881). The Survey of Western Palestine: Arabic and English Name Lists Collected During the Survey by Lieutenants Conder and Kitchener, R. E. Transliterated and Explained by E.H. Palmer. Committee of the Palestine Exploration Fund.
- Robinson, E.; Smith, E. (1841). Biblical Researches in Palestine, Mount Sinai and Arabia Petraea: A Journal of Travels in the year 1838. Vol. 2. Boston: Crocker & Brewster.
- Robinson, E.; Smith, E. (1841). Biblical Researches in Palestine, Mount Sinai and Arabia Petraea: A Journal of Travels in the year 1838. Vol. 3. Boston: Crocker & Brewster.
- Schick, C. (1896). "Zur Einwohnerzahl des Bezirks Jerusalem". Zeitschrift des Deutschen Palästina-Vereins. 19: 120–127.
- Socin, A. (1879). "Alphabetisches Verzeichniss von Ortschaften des Paschalik Jerusalem". Zeitschrift des Deutschen Palästina-Vereins. 2: 135–163.
