= Bat Ayin =

Israeli settlement in the West Bank

Bat Ayin: בַּת עַיִן (Hebrew); بات عاين (Arabic)
- Israeli settlement
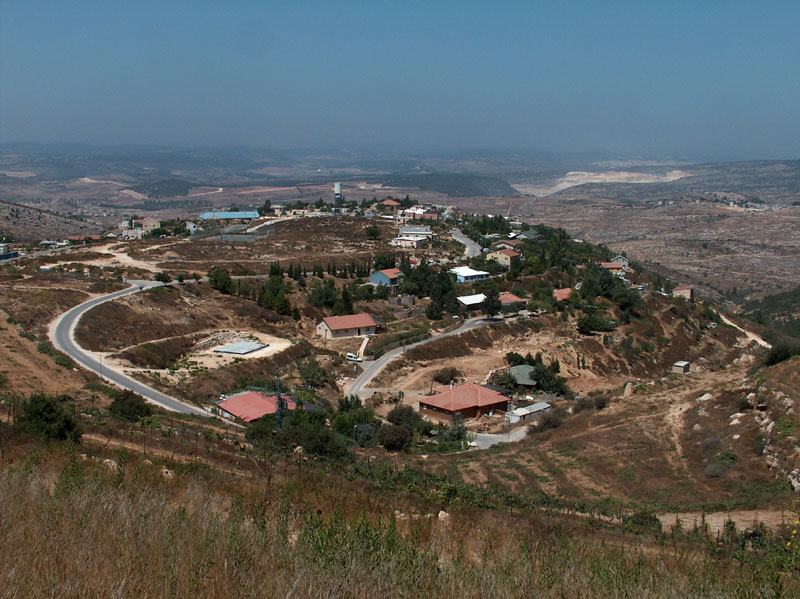
- Etymology: Daughter of [the] Spring
- Location within the Southern West Bank
- Coordinates: 31°39′26″N 35°6′8″E
- Country: Palestine
- District: Judea and Samaria Area
- Council: Gush Etzion
- Region: West Bank
- Affiliation: Amana
- Founded: 1989
- Founder: Rabbi Yitzchak Ginsburg
- Population (2024): 2,034

Bat Ayin (Hebrew: בַּת עַיִן, lit., "daughter of the eye" or "apple of the eye", i. e., pupil, Arabic: بات عاين) is an Israeli settlement in Gush Etzion in the West Bank, between Jerusalem and Hebron, founded in 1989 by Rabbi Yitzchak Ginsburg, in lands that Israel confiscated from the neighbouring Palestinian villages of Khirbet Beit Zakariyyah and Jab'a. It is administered by the Gush Etzion Regional Council, with a population of less than 1,000, consisting mainly of "Ba'alei T'shuva" (back to the faith) Jews with Hasidic tendencies. The international community considers Israeli settlements in the West Bank illegal under international law, but Israel disputes this.

== History and background ==
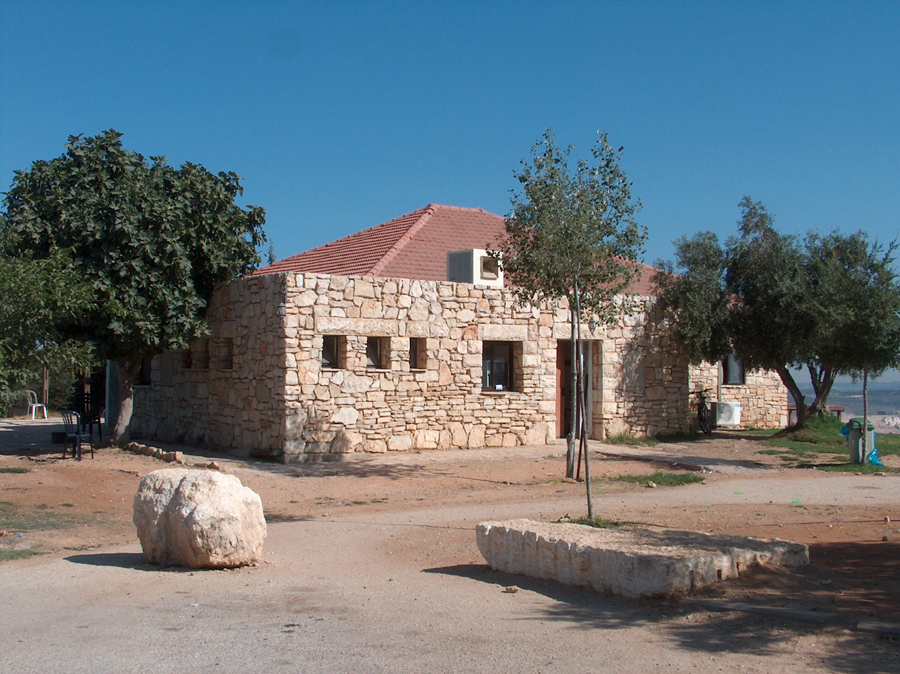
Bat Ayin synagogue

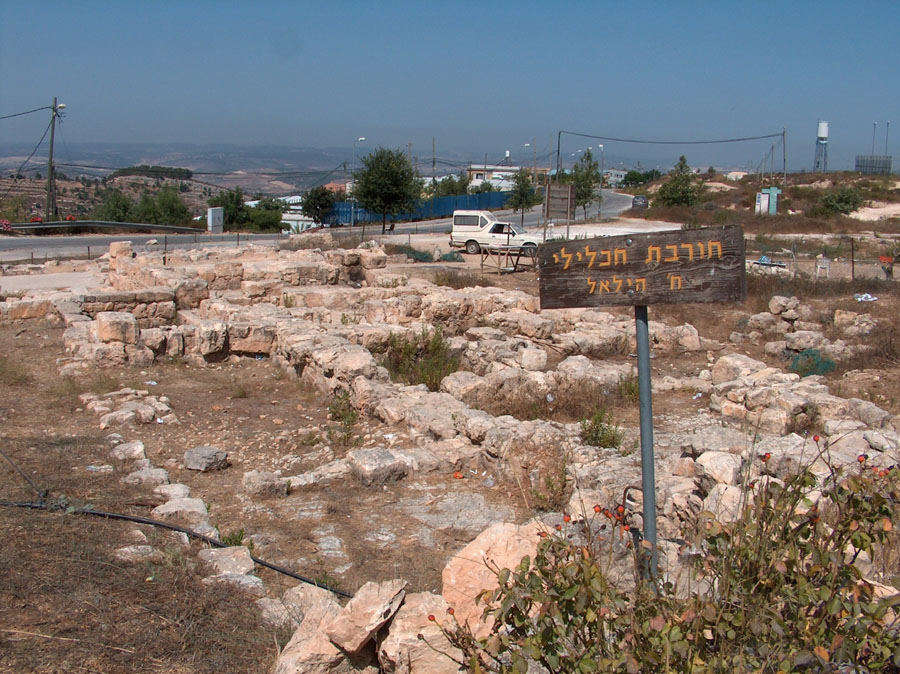
Bat Ayin archeology site

According to ARIJ, Israel confiscated land from 2 neighbouring Palestinian villages in order to construct Bat Ayin; 144 dunams from Khirbet Beit Zakariyyah in addition to land taken from Jab'a.

Bat Ayin was established by seven families led by Rabbi Yitzchak Ginsburg in 1989, on land originally purchased by Jews before 1948, which, under Jordanian rule until 1967, was treated as "enemy property". Eventually, large lots of land were allocated to some 40 families. People of the settlement did not come from the settler mainstream establishment. Many of the original settlers were raised on the "hills". It gained a reputation for being particularly extremist and very callous towards local Palestinians, none of whom were allowed to pass anywhere near the settlement. In the early 2000s general elections, half of Bat Ayin voters expressed a preference for the Herut candidate Baruch Marzel. In 1993, Motti Karpel and Chaim Nativ set up the Chai Vekayam (Alive and Well) movement in Bat Ayin, whose document, "Identity Card", stated clearly that the laws of the state of Israel are not binding on West Bank settlers. According to one resident, in an extensive interview, Israel is only for Jews, who are a "chosen people", and Palestinians are required to serve them, according to the Torah's words: "People will work for you, nations will bow for you." The settlement is said to have expansionist interests, having established an illegal outpost called West-West Bat Ayin.

=== Bat Ayin Underground ===
Bat Ayin residents have been suspected of numerous acts of terror, aside from attacking Arabs: These include plots to attack Israeli politicians, and plans to blow up mosques, including those on the Temple Mount. Though arrests have been made, all suspects have been released for want of evidence. An extremist movement based in Bat Ayin, later known as the Bat Ayin Underground, was founded on the belief, shared by extremist settlers, that the Israeli government was acting against the interests of the Jewish people. The group's agenda has been seen as "isolationist" in its hostility to secular Israeli society and commitment to the Torah. The notion of forming such a group apparently arose in late 1998, as a result of a conversation between two eighteen-year-olds - Shahar Dvir-Zeliger, who hailed from the Adei Ad farm, and Sela Tor, who alternated between Hebron and the Maon Farm founded by his brother Yehoshafat. The Maon Farm provided several recruits, as did the Israeli settlement in Hebron. They eventually recruited Shahar's brother Shlomo, Yarden Morag, and Ofer Gamliel, whose engineering background in the IDF was to prove useful in making a bomb. In early 2001, they began to engage in drive-by shootings of Palestinian cars at nighttime on minor roadways, spraying them with fire from automatic weapons, and the planting of bombs in public buildings. Their most notable "success" was an ambush of a Palestinian Mercedes truck near Ramallah and Kokhav HaShahar, killing its two occupants, one a twenty-year-old man. Cell members claimed responsibility through a group called "Tears of the Widows and the Orphans". Overall, the group, once arrested, admitted to seven attacks of this nature, which claimed eight Palestinian lives and sixteen wounded.

On September 17, 2001, the network planted two bombs in a Palestinian schoolyard at Yatta: One was timed to explode during the recess, and a second bomb several minutes later, in the expectation that teachers and students would be drawn to examine the damage. A malfunction caused the first bomb to explode earlier, and Israeli sappers managed to defuse the second bomb in time.

In a second operation on March 5, 2002, the Bat Ayin group, retaliating for a Hamas suicide bombing at Beit Yisrael, planted a bomb in a pink ice cream carton at a Palestinian boys school in Sur Baher. Children noticed it, covered it with pillows, and informed their principal who called the police, but it exploded before they arrived, and ten of the boys were slightly injured.

In an operation undertaken on the night of April 29, 2002, Yarden Morag and Shlomo Dvir drove a vehicle with a trailer to East Jerusalem. They were initially stopped near the Beit Orot Yeshiva by Mount Scopus, because it was irregular for Jews with skullcaps to drive in Palestinian areas of East Jerusalem, at night. They were not detained, since police accepted their excuse that they were on their way to a yeshiva. The same police officers, Shimon Cohen and Barak Segev, later sighted the same vehicle near a girls' school, close by the Al-Makassad hospital in the At-Tur neighbourhood. The officers stopped the two and examined the car, finding that the trailer had two containers of gasoline rigged to two TNT bricks, and propane gas tanks. The explosive charge consisted of a "vergin" (military battery), and the device, in a baby carriage, was timed to explode at 7:35 am., when dozens of girls would have been entering the schoolgrounds. Later investigations revealed this was not a one-off strike, but rather, part of a West Bank network of settlers conducting a campaign against Palestinians. Israeli intelligence soon heard of a large cache of weapons, and suspected it might imply an attack on the Temple Mount was being prepared. Eventually, 6 men, residents of Bat Ayin and Hebron, were convicted, while other led members were charged with minor felonies or not put on trial. Efforts to discover the weapons catch and convict members of the wider network, who had connections to the Kach extremist group, failed, according to Daniel Byman, because they had learnt the lessons of the group's manual on how to confront a Shin Bet interrogation. Shlomo Dvir and Ofer Gamliel received 15-year sentences, Morag twelve years, and Shahar Dvir eight years. Three of the men were convicted of attempted murder. Ofer Gamliel was released from prison two years early in 2015, although the Shin Bet had repeatedly protested any early release for him.

=== Other incidents ===
On February 25, 2007, Erez Levanon, a resident of Bat Ayin, was found killed by multiple stab wounds. His body was found down the hill from the settlement in a secluded location where he frequently prayed. Two teenagers from Khirbet Safa confessed to the murder.

On April 2, 2009, an Arab wielding an ax entered Bat Ayin and murdered Shlomo Nativ, aged 13. A 7-year-old child was also wounded. The attacker was arrested a few weeks later by Israel's security services.

In a stone-throwing incident on April 8, 2009 involving Bat Ayin and Khirbet Safa residents, sixteen Palestinians were injured, one critically, when the IDF opened fire.

On May 2, 2009, two off-duty Israel Defense Forces soldiers and two residents of Bat Ayin were arrested in a rock-throwing incident in which two Khirbet Safa villagers were injured.

In another clash on January 28, 2011, Yousef Ikhlayl, age 17, of Khirbet Safa was shot in the head, and died in a hospital in Beit Jala.

On August 16, 2012, a Molotov cocktail was thrown at a taxi occupied by six members of a Palestinian family as it passed by Bat Ayin. The taxi caught fire, and the passengers were treated for burns at Hadassah Medical Center, Ein Karem. Three boys, aged 12–13, studying at a yeshiva in Bat Ayin were arrested as suspects. The attack was condemned by the rabbi of Bat Ayin, who saw it as an example of "moral degeneration". Internal Security Minister Yitzhak Aharonovitch, on learning of the children's arrest, claimed that there were concentrations of extreme rightists in Bat Ayin. He also added that he was "confident that the police, IDF, and the Shin Bet will do their job, which is not simple, because we know who we are dealing with". The three minors were subsequently released under house arrest.

In late October 2013, masked settlers beat with a bat a Palestinian truck driver carrying goods ordered by the settlement and assaulted two IDF soldiers. The IDF responded by suspending assistance to Bat Ayin's defense.

In March 2015, residents of Bat Ayin had an altercation with the IDF and police. Law enforcement representatives went to the settlement to arrest two residents for allegedly committing "nationalist crimes". Bat Ayin is known for its "extremist ideology", and the police were blocked by about 20 youths throwing stones. Authorities called for reinforcements, and law enforcement was able to leave with the suspects. Residents of Bat Ayin accused the police and IDF of provoking the incident.

In April 2015, Elad Yaakov Sela (25) from Bat Ayin, a corporal serving as an intelligence NCO in the Etzion Brigade, was indicted for espionage and leaking confidential information to extreme right-wing members of the community, to tip them off about forthcoming arrests in the wake of a price tag attack on a nearby mosque. He was sentenced to 3 years and 9 months imprisonment after being convicted of the charges, in January 2016.

== Demographics ==
In 2013, there were about 200 families, many of them residing as tenants, in Bat Ayin. The majority of the residents are religious-Zionist and Chardal Jews who adhere to a philosophy that combines spiritual religious life with organic agriculture, with Hasidic Breslov the predominant affiliation. Social norms are rigid, and some young people tend to leave. Bat Ayin Orthodoxy is popularly known as "Chavakuk" (Hebrew, חבקו"ק), an acronym for Chabad, Breslov, (Rabbi Abraham Isaac) Kook, and (Shlomo) Carlebach. There is a Chabad Lubavitch community, as well. The Bat Ayin community includes physicians, builders, plumbers, electricians, and psychologists.

== Landmarks ==
The area is rich in natural springs. The Jab'a village spring Ein El Abhara is one of 30 in the West Bank that have been taken over by Israeli settlers, who now call it Ein Livne. According to OCHA collected testimonies, settlers from Bat Ayin began planting trees in the area of the Ein al-Sijme spring, on Palestinian land leased to the Thawabta family, in the late 1990s. Due to harassment, the family was forced to abandon its vineyards and orchards, and the area remains uncultivated.

== Education and religious institutions ==
The Bat Ayin Yeshiva is an institution of advanced Jewish learning for men offering two main programs: a Beit Midrash study program and a Smicha program for rabbinical ordination. Midreshet B'erot Bat Ayin offers women's programs, a conversion program, and seminars.

The rabbi of Bat Ayin is Daniel Kohn, who holds a BA in comparative religion from Columbia University and received rabbinic ordination from the Chief Rabbinate of Israel. He co-founded the Bat Ayin Yeshiva, and served as co-Rosh Yeshiva for nine years.
