= Israel Football Association =

Association football governing body of Israel

UEFA
- Founded: August 14, 1928 (as Palestine Football Association)
- Headquarters: Ramat Gan, Tel Aviv District, Israel
- FIFA affiliation: October 17, 1929
- UEFA affiliation: 1992
- Chairman: Moshe Zuares
- Website: www.football.org.il

The Israel Football Association (IFA; Hebrew: ההתאחדות לכדורגל בישראל) is the governing body of football in Israel. It organizes major domestic competitions including the Israeli Premier League, the Israel State Cup, the Toto Cup, and the Israel Super Cup, as well as the Israel national football team.

Founded in 1928 as the Palestine Football Association during the period of Mandatory Palestine, the organization joined FIFA in 1929. It adopted its present name following the establishment of the State of Israel in 1948. Headquartered in Ramat Gan, the IFA was a founding member of the Asian Football Confederation (AFC) until its expulsion in 1974 amid regional political boycotts. After nearly two decades outside any continental confederation, the IFA joined UEFA in 1992.

== History ==
The Palestine Football Association was founded at a meeting held on 14 August 1928 and applied for membership of FIFA. It was admitted provisionally on 17 December 1928, affiliated on 17 May 1929 and recognised by FIFA's government on 6 July 1929. The FAP changed its name to the Israel Football Association (IFA) following the founding of the state of Israel in 1948.

The IFA was a member of the Asian Football Confederation (AFC) and competed at a high level during the AFC's infancy, from 1954 until 1974, when it was expelled due to political pressure from Arab and Muslim members that refused to play against Israel in spite of not reaching enough votes to carry the motion. From then until 1992, the IFA was not affiliated with any confederation. During this period, the Israeli national teams played only in FIFA competitions and occasionally in OFC (Oceania), UEFA (Europe), and CONMEBOL (South America) World Cup qualification tournaments.

In 1992, the IFA was admitted to UEFA as an associate member, becoming a full member two years later. Since 1992, Israeli clubs have played in the various UEFA club competitions, while the national teams have played in UEFA championships.

== Controversy ==
As of 2017, the IFA included six member clubs playing in Israeli settlements in the West Bank. These are Maccabi Ariel indoor football club and Ariel municipal football club in Ariel; Beitar Givat Ze’ev Shabi in Giv'at Ze'ev, a settlement near Ramallah; Beitar Ma’aleh Adomim in Ma'ale Adumim, a settlement near East Jerusalem; Hapo’el Oranit in Oranit; and Hapo’el Jordan Valley in Tomer, a settlement built on land seized from the Palestinian village of Fasayil. A seventh club, Hapo’el Katamon Yerushalayim, plays some home games in the settlement of Ma'ale Adumim while two other clubs playing in Israel list offices in settlements near Hebron and Ramallah. Sari Bashi, Israel and Palestine advocacy director for Human Rights Watch, argues that the IFA is in violation of FIFA rules forbidding a club of one national association from playing in the territory of another as the West Bank is covered by the Palestinian Football Association, a FIFA member. Bashi also notes that Palestinians are not allowed to enter settlements to watch games played by these clubs.

German sportswear company Adidas previously sponsored the IFA, leading to criticism for supporting settlement clubs. More than 130 Palestinian sports clubs signed an open letter calling for Adidas to end its sponsorship of the IFA. An online petition of the BDS Movement to "Tell Adidas to end sponsorship of Israeli settlement teams" reportedly received more than 16,000 signatures. In June 2018, a Dutch BDS group delivered the open letter and petition to an Adidas office in Amsterdam. In July 2018, Adidas ended its sponsorship deal but was replaced as sponsor by Puma, another German sportswear company. As a result, Puma has become a BDS target with critics arguing that Puma, the IFA's only international sponsor, "is involved in violations of international law and human rights." Aya Khattab, a player on the Palestinian National Women's football team, argued that "Puma's sponsorship of the IFA, and the international legitimacy that it grants, signal to Israel's racist far-right regime that its expansion of illegal settlements by pushing Palestinian families off their ancestral lands can continue with impunity." Mahmoud Sarsak, a Palestinian football player who was imprisoned by Israel for several years without charge or trial, accused Puma of "supporting the hate which is destroying lives and poisoning the beautiful game" of football. In addition to Khattab and Sarsak, more than 200 Palestinian athletes and sports clubs have called for a Puma boycott, according to an article in Mondoweiss. In October 2019, posters calling for a boycott of Puma appeared on trains in London. The posters were removed by Transport for London, which described them as an unauthorized act of vandalism. In 2020, Universiti Teknologi MARA, the largest university in Malaysia, ended a sponsorship deal with Puma for their football team due to Puma's IFA sponsorship.

During the 74th FIFA Congress on 17 May 2024 in Bangkok, the Palestinian Football Association called for a vote on suspending the IFA from both UEFA and FIFA, stating that the damage to football infrastructure and deaths of Palestinian footballers during the Gaza war were enough grounds to justify the action, while other supporters referred to other suspensions such as those of Apartheid South Africa from 1961 to 1991 and Russia following the Russian invasion of Ukraine in 2022. The IFA responded stating that their football was halted and that many of their footballers have been killed since 7 October 2023 while calling for peace and a future friendly between the two countries. Gianni Infantino would respond to the PFA stating that FIFA would conduct its own legal review and that the information about a final decision would be forwarded to the FIFA Council meeting on 3 October 2024 while also calling for peace. It was later decided that while Israel would not be suspended, FIFA would investigate the claims by the PFA. During the 75th FIFA Congress on 15 May 2025 in Asunción, Susan Shalabi, a Palestinian FA representative, brought up that FIFA was taking too long on its investigation regarding the IFA when it promised to make the investigation quick. On 19 March 2026, the IFA was sanctioned by FIFA due to "offensive behaviour, violations of the principles of fair play, and discrimination and racist abuse" and was forced to pay a fine to the amount of CHF 150,000 as well as implement a prevention plan including the display of a significant and highly visible banner with the words "Football Unites the World – No to Discrimination" alongside the Israel Football Association’s logo during the next three matches at home from the sanction date as well as investing one-third of the fine towards the implementation of a comprehensive plan to ensure action against discrimination. The complaints from the PFA of FIFA taking too long on its investigation regarding the IFA were reiterated during the 76th FIFA Congress on 30 April 2026 in Vancouver.

== Awards and recognition ==
In 1979, Yosef Yekutieli, the founder of the IFA, was awarded the Israel Prize "for dedicating his life to promoting and laying the international foundation of Israeli sports."

== See also ==
- List of football stadiums in Israel
- Sport in Israel
