= Bat Ayin axe attack =

2009 civilian attack in Bat Ayin, Israel

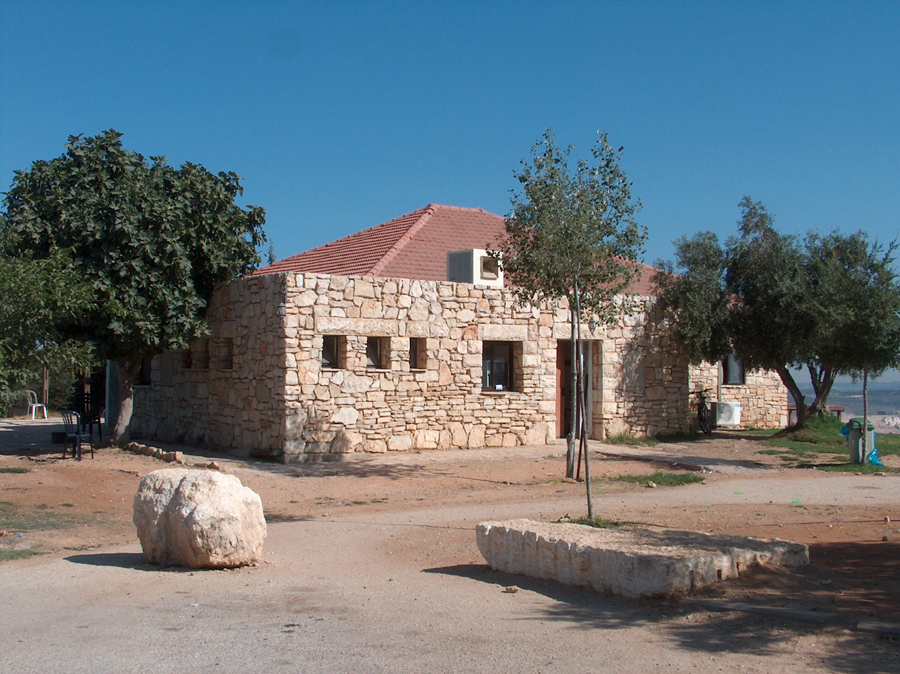
- The synagogue in Bat Ayin, near to where the attacks occurred

- The location of Bat Ayin
- Native name: פיגוע הגרזן בבת עין
- Location: Bat Ayin, West Bank
- Date: 2 April 2009; 17 years ago c. 12:00 (UTC+2)
- Attack type: Axe attack
- Weapons: Pickaxe and a knife
- Deaths: a 13-year-old Israeli civilian (Shlomo Nativ)
- Injuries: 3 Israeli children (1 seriously injured)
- Perpetrators: Palestinian Islamic Jihad and other Palestinian groups claimed responsibility, Israeli authorities stated no link between Tayet and any militant groups
- Assailant: Moussa Tayet
- No. of participants: 1

The Bat Ayin axe attack was an attack by a Palestinian man that took place on 2 April 2009 in the West Bank, when Moussa Tayet attacked a group of Israeli children with an axe and a knife, killing 13-year-old boy Shlomo Nativ and seriously wounding 7-year-old boy Yair Gamliel, in the Israeli settlement of Bat Ayin.

Palestinian Islamic Jihad immediately claimed responsibility for the attack, as did two obscure Palestinian groups. On 14 April, Israeli security forces arrested Tayet, of Khirbet Safa; he later confessed to the killing. Israeli authorities stated that Tayet had no links to any organized militant groups.

Israeli Prime Minister Benjamin Netanyahu condemned the attack, while Hamas justified it.

== Attack ==
The attack took place on Thursday, 2 April 2009, during the Passover holiday. Around noon, a Palestinian militant entered the West Bank settlement of Bat Ayin, located between Jerusalem and Hebron, unhindered. Although most Israeli settlements are surrounded by security fences, Bat Ayin residents had refused to build one, saying it would be a sign of weakness.

Around 12:00 (local time) the assailant proceeded to attack a group of Israeli children playing tennis near the local cultural center with a pickaxe and a knife. He killed 13-year-old Israeli boy Shlomo Nativ and fractured the skull of 7-year-old boy Yair Gamliel, seriously wounding him. A third boy managed to escape. Emergency rescue workers from Magen David Adom who arrived at the scene stated that Nativ had managed to get to his home located right across the street, leaving behind a trail of blood, but died of his injuries despite his brother's attempts to resuscitate him. Gamliel was evacuated to Hadassah Medical Center at Ein Karem in Jerusalem, where he underwent an operation.

45-year-old resident Avinoam Maymon, a passerby who saw the assailant running after the younger boy, managed to forcibly remove the weapon from his hand while he tried to stab him. Witnesses reported that the attacker acted wildly and continued to attack passersby before fleeing the area. Gush Etzion Regional Council Mayor Shaul Goldstein said Bat Ayin's security squad managed to shoot and hit the assailant, but he managed to escape to a neighboring Arab village, leaving the pickaxe behind.

== Subsequent events ==
Nativ was buried in the Kfar Etzion cemetery that evening. Hundreds of people attended his funeral.

The attack triggered clashes between Israeli settlers and Palestinians which were halted only after Israeli military intervention.

=== Claims of responsibility ===
Less than an hour after the attack, the Palestinian Islamic Jihad claimed responsibility. The Al-Aqsa Martyrs Brigades, part of Palestinian President Mahmoud Abbas' Fatah political party, also claimed responsibility for the attack.

A little-known Palestinian militant group calling itself the "Martyrs of Imad Mughniyeh" also claimed responsibility for the attack, saying that Palestinian Islamic Jihad was also involved. Imad Mughniya was a Hezbollah commander killed in Syria in 2008. But Israeli defense officials believed the group is merely a name used by other Palestinian militant groups to avoid Israeli reprisals. The group excused its delay in claiming responsibility by citing "security reasons."

A previously unknown Palestinian militant group calling itself "the Palestine Strugglers Army" also claimed to have orchestrated the attack.

=== Capturing of the perpetrator ===
Following the attack, the IDF launched a manhunt for the perpetrator, and boosted security and set up roadblocks throughout communities in the region.

On the evening of 14 April, Israeli security forces captured the perpetrator Moussa Tayet, a 26-year-old Palestinian resident of Khirbet Safa, after receiving information he was hiding in Beit Ummar, located south of Bethlehem.

During questioning, Tayet confessed to the killing and re-enacted the incident from the planning stage until he fled the scene. He stated that he had committed the act for religious reasons, adding that he had wanted to be a martyr and had written a will 10 days before carrying out the attack. Tayet also led the investigators to the weapons he had hidden in the field after the killing and handed over the knife he used in the attack. In addition, Tayet said that he had acquired the ax two weeks before the attack.

Israeli officials stated that Tayet had no links to any organized militant groups. Also, a Palestinian security official told the newspaper Yedioth Ahronot that a Palestinian Authority investigation into the attack determined that the perpetrator was working alone.

== Official reactions ==
Israel:

- Israeli Prime Minister Benjamin Netanyahu issued a statement saying he viewed the attack with "utmost gravity," and directing the security services to take all steps necessary to apprehend the murderer.
- Israeli government spokesman Mark Regev said, "The new Israeli government will have a zero tolerance policy toward these sorts of attacks and will refuse to accept them as routine" and that "the Palestinian leadership must both in word and in deed too have a zero tolerance policy to this sort of attack to demonstrate its commitment to peace and reconciliation."

France:

- France's Minister of Foreign Affairs Bernard Kouchner condemned the attack, calling it a "barbaric act" and saying that "France is horrified by this terrorist attack."

Palestine:

- A Hamas spokesman described the attack as "a natural reaction ... especially against the backdrop of Israeli attacks. We are a people occupied, and it is our right to defend ourselves and to act in every way and with every means at our disposal in order to defend ourselves."

== See also ==
- Palestinian political violence
- Civil defense in Israel
