= Al-Mazra'a al-Qibliya =

Village in Ramallah and al-Bireh, Palestine

- Municipality type C

Arabic transcription(s)
  - Arabic: المزرعه القبليّه
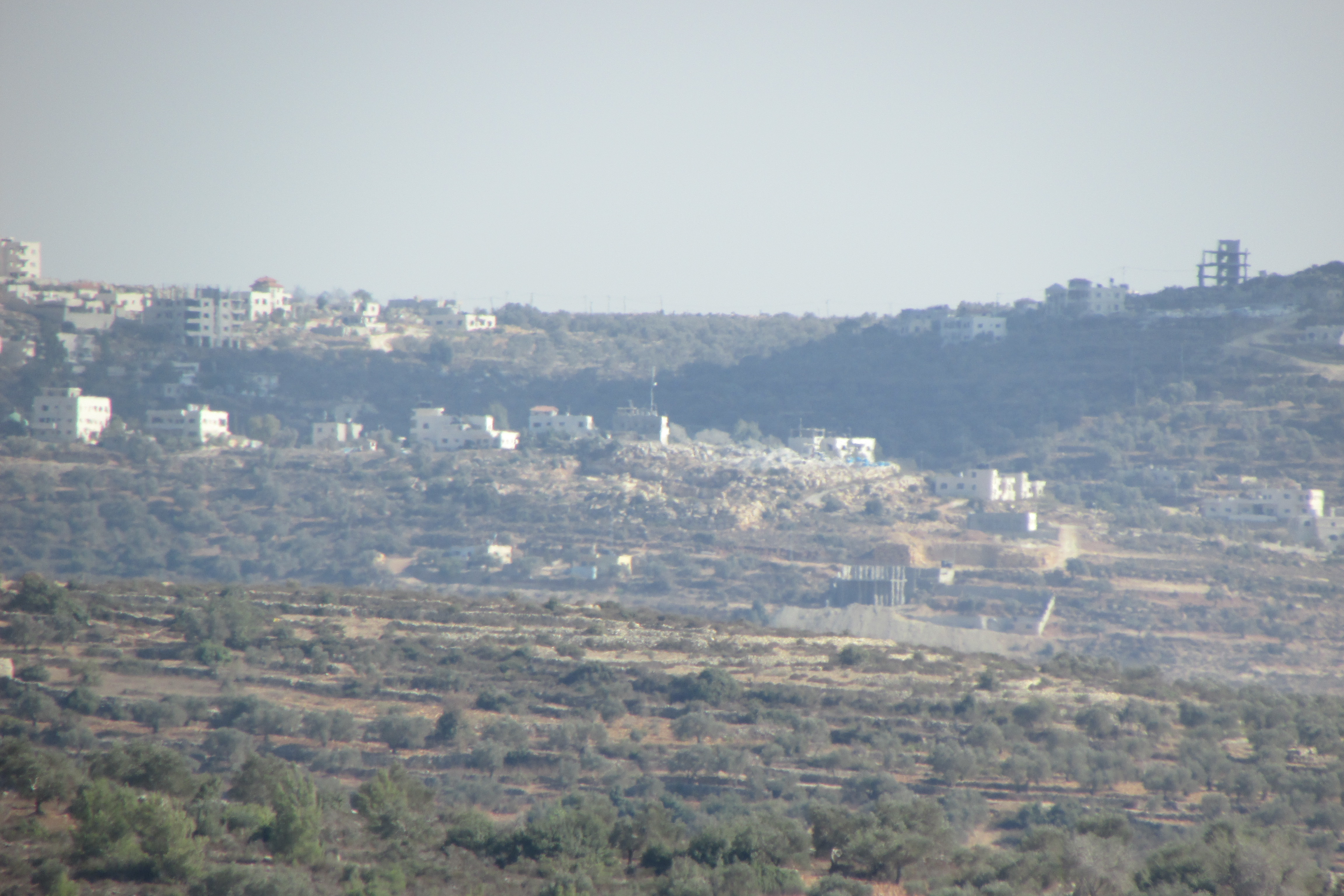
- Al-Mazra'a al-Qibliya

- Location of Al-Mazra'a al-Qibliya within Palestine
- Coordinates: 31°57′13″N 35°09′33″E
- Palestine grid: 164/151
- State: State of Palestine
- Governorate: Ramallah and al-Bireh

Government
  - Type: Municipality
  - Head of Municipality: Abdullah Ladadwa

Area
  - Total: 15.5 km^{2} (6.0 sq mi)

Population (2017)
  - Total: 5,180
  - Density: 334/km^{2} (866/sq mi)
- Name meaning: Mezeirat el Kibliyeh; the southern sown land
- Website: www.alzeitona-mun.org

Al-Mazra'a al-Qibliya is a Palestinian village in the Ramallah and al-Bireh Governorate. The village had a population of 5,180 in 2017.

In 2005 it merged with the village of Abu Shukheidim to form the town of Al-Zaitounah.

== History ==
Pottery sherds from the Byzantine era and the early Ottoman period have been found here. Finkelstein and Lederman argue that Röhricht's identification of the village with the Medieval site of Mezrea, mentioned in a Frankish text related to the area, should be disregarded in light of these findings.

=== Ottoman era ===
The village was incorporated into the Ottoman Empire in 1517 with all of Palestine, and in 1596 it appeared in the Ottoman tax registers as Qibliyya, being in the nahiya (subdistrict) of Quds, part of the liwa (district) of Quds. It had a population of 8 households, all Muslims. The villagers paid a fixed tax rate of 33.3% on various agricultural products, including wheat, barley, summer crops, olive trees, goats and/or beehives, in addition to "occasional revenues"; a total of 2,190 akçe. Pottery sherds from the early Ottoman era have also been found here.

In 1838, it was noted as a Muslim village, el-Mezra'ah, in the Bani Harith district, north of Jerusalem.

An Ottoman village list of about 1870 showed that Mezra'a had 111 houses and a population of 428, though the population count included men, only.

In 1882, the PEF's Survey of Western Palestine described Mezeirat el Kibliyeh as: "a good sized village on low ground, among olives".

In 1896 the population of 'Mezraa in Bani Harit was estimated to be about 1,569 persons.

=== British Mandate ===
In the 1922 census of Palestine, conducted by the British Mandate of Palestine, there were 492 people living in Al Mizra'a al-Qibliyeh, all Muslims, rising to 799 Muslims in the 1931 census, in a total of 162 houses.

In 1945 statistics the population was 860, all Muslims, while the total land area was 13,240 dunams, according to an official land and population survey. Of this, 6,483 were plantations and irrigable land, 1,847 for cereals, while 34 dunams were classified as built-up areas.

=== Jordanian era ===
In the wake of the 1948 Arab–Israeli War, and after the 1949 Armistice Agreements, Al-Mazra'a al-Qibliya came under Jordanian rule.

The Jordanian census of 1961 found 1,349 inhabitants.

=== Post-1967 ===
Since the Six-Day War in 1967, Al-Mazra'a al-Qibliya has been under Israeli occupation.

After the 1995 accords, 54.2% of Al-Zaitounah land was defined as Area B, while the remaining 45.8% was defined as Area C. Israel has confiscated 308 dunams of land from Al-Zaitounah in order to construct two Israeli settlements, Talmon and Nahl'iel.

Israeli settlers have started encroaching on Al-Mazra'a al-Qibliya land, especially the hilltop named Khirbet Na’alan. On October 15, 2018, the settlers entered the village in the night and damaged 28 cars, drawing Stars of David on them and writing “Death to the Arabs.” On October 26, 2018, in an altercation between villagers and Israeli settlers, the Israel Border Police, without warning, started shooting the Palestinian villagers. 9 Palestinians were wounded, 2 were killed; Uthman Labawda, 33 years old and the father of 4, and Mohammed Ibrahim Shreitah, the father of 2.

== Bibliography ==
- Barron, J.B., ed. (1923). Palestine: Report and General Abstracts of the Census of 1922. Government of Palestine.
- Conder, C.R.; Kitchener, H.H. (1882). The Survey of Western Palestine: Memoirs of the Topography, Orography, Hydrography, and Archaeology. Vol. 2. London: Committee of the Palestine Exploration Fund.
- Finkelstein, I.; Lederman, Zvi, eds. (1997). Highlands of many cultures. Tel Aviv: Institute of Archaeology of Tel Aviv University Publications Section. ISBN 965-440-007-3.
- Government of Jordan, Department of Statistics (1964). First Census of Population and Housing. Volume I: Final Tables; General Characteristics of the Population (PDF).
- Government of Palestine, Department of Statistics (1945). Village Statistics, April, 1945.
- Hadawi, S. (1970). Village Statistics of 1945: A Classification of Land and Area ownership in Palestine. Palestine Liberation Organization Research Center. Archived from the original on 2018-12-08.
- Hartmann, M. (1883). "Die Ortschaftenliste des Liwa Jerusalem in dem türkischen Staatskalender für Syrien auf das Jahr 1288 der Flucht (1871)". Zeitschrift des Deutschen Palästina-Vereins. 6: 102–149.
- Hütteroth, W.-D.; Abdulfattah, K. (1977). Historical Geography of Palestine, Transjordan and Southern Syria in the Late 16th Century. Erlanger Geographische Arbeiten, Sonderband 5. Erlangen, Germany: Vorstand der Fränkischen Geographischen Gesellschaft. ISBN 3-920405-41-2.
- Mills, E., ed. (1932). Census of Palestine 1931. Population of Villages, Towns and Administrative Areas. Jerusalem: Government of Palestine.
- Palmer, E.H. (1881). The Survey of Western Palestine: Arabic and English Name Lists Collected During the Survey by Lieutenants Conder and Kitchener, R. E. Transliterated and Explained by E.H. Palmer. Committee of the Palestine Exploration Fund.
- Robinson, E.; Smith, E. (1841). Biblical Researches in Palestine, Mount Sinai and Arabia Petraea: A Journal of Travels in the year 1838. Vol. 3. Boston: Crocker & Brewster.
- Schick, C. (1896). "Zur Einwohnerzahl des Bezirks Jerusalem". Zeitschrift des Deutschen Palästina-Vereins. 19: 120–127.
- Socin, A. (1879). "Alphabetisches Verzeichniss von Ortschaften des Paschalik Jerusalem". Zeitschrift des Deutschen Palästina-Vereins. 2: 135–163.
