= Chabakuk (Judaism) =

Chabakuk or Chavakuk is a Neo-Hasidic movement which synthesizes the teachings of Chabad, Breslov, Carlebach, and Religious Zionism. It is most notably followed by the Bat Ayin settlement in the Gush Etzion bloc.

== See also ==
- Hasidic Judaism
- Jewish religious movements
- Haredi nationalism
- Hardal
