= Al-Zaitounah =

al-Zaitounah
- Municipality type C

Arabic transcription(s)
  - Arabic: الزيتونة
  - Latin: al-Zaytouneh (official)
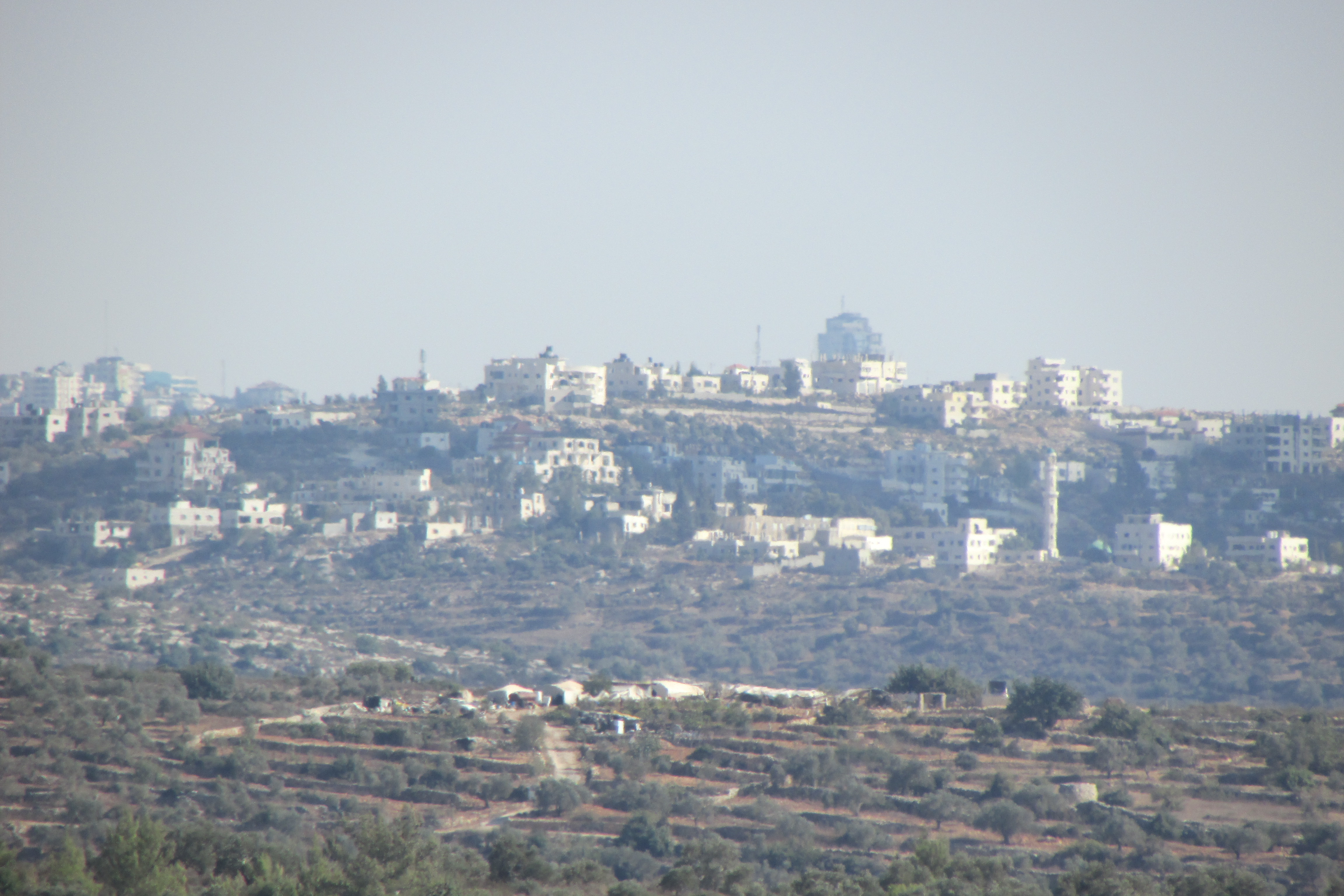
- al-Zaitounah

- Location of al-Zaitounah within Palestine
- Coordinates: 31°57′24″N 35°9′55″E
- Palestine grid: 166/152, 164/151
- State: State of Palestine
- Governorate: Ramallah and al-Bireh
- Founded: 2005

Government
  - Type: Municipality
  - Head of Municipality: Abdullah Ladadwa

Area
  - Total: 15.5 km^{2} (6.0 sq mi)
- Elevation: 579 m (1,900 ft)

Population (2013)
  - Total: 8,105
  - Density: 523/km^{2} (1,350/sq mi)
- Name meaning: "the Olive"
- Website: www.alzeitona-mun.org

Al-Zaitounah (Arabic: الزيتونة, meaning "the Olive") is a Palestinian town in the Ramallah and al-Bireh Governorate of the State of Palestine. It was formed in 2005 as the result of a merger of the villages of Abu Shukheidim and al-Mazra'a al-Qibliya. In 2007, al-Zaitounah had a population of 6,190, according to the Palestinian Central Bureau of Statistics.

== Location ==
AL-Zaytouneh is located 7.76 kilometers (4.82 mi) from Ramallah. It is bordered by Bir Zeit and Abu Qash to the east, Kobar and the settlement of Nahliel to the north, Al-Itihad and Al Janiya to the west, and 'Ein Qiniya, Ramallah and Al Janiya to the south.

== History ==
Al-Zaitounah was formed in 2005 as the result of a merger of the villages of Abu Shukheidim and al-Mazra'a al-Qibliya.

After the Oslo II Accord, 54.2% of Al-Zaitounah's land was classified as Area B land, while the remaining 45.8% is defined as Area C. Israel has confiscated 308 dunams of land from Al-Zaitounah for the construction of 2 Israeli settlements: 289 dunams for Talmon, while 19 dunams for Nahl'iel.
