= Petza'el =

Israeli settlement in the West Bank

Petza'el: פְּצָאֵל (Hebrew)
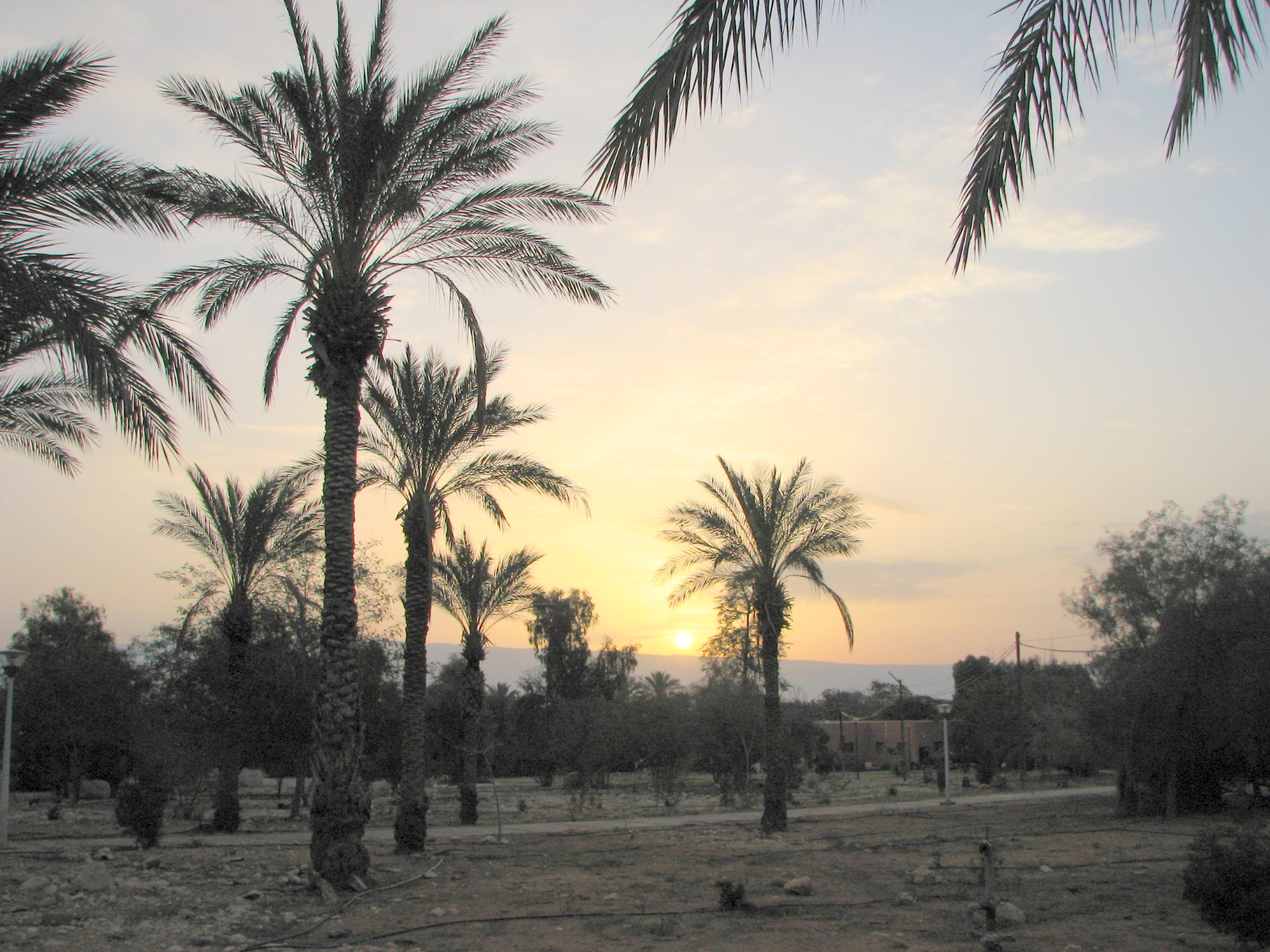

- Location within the Central West Bank
- Coordinates: 32°02′39″N 35°26′32″E
- Country: Palestine
- District: Judea and Samaria Area
- Council: Bik'at HaYarden
- Region: West Bank
- Affiliation: Moshavim Movement
- Founded: 1970
- Founder: Moshavim Movement
- Population (2024): 573

Petza'el (Hebrew: פְּצָאֵל) is a moshav and Israeli settlement in the West Bank. Located in the center of the Jordan Valley, 34.5 kilometers from the Green line, it falls under the jurisdiction of Bik'at HaYarden Regional Council. In 2024 it had a population of 573. It is named for Phasael, older brother of Herod the Great, for whom he had named a city nearby in ancient times.

The international community considers Israeli settlements in the West Bank illegal under international law, but the Israeli and US governments dispute this.

== History ==
During the Roman period, King Herod the Great of Judaea established a new city in the Jordan Valley north of Jericho, which he named Phasaelis (Ancient Greek: Φασαηλίς, Phasaēlís), in dedication to his elder brother Phasael. Its remains were identified in the area (more at Fasayil: History and archaeology).

=== Modern Petza'el ===
Petza'el was established near Ma'ale Efraim in 1970 by former soldiers who were members of the Moshavim Movement. The settlement was initially administered as both a moshav and a kibbutz. In 1975 the settlement moved to a location in the valley where the agricultural fields of the members were located. According to ARIJ, in order to construct Petza'el Israel confiscated land from two Palestinian villages: 1,242 dunams from Fasayil, 176 dunams from Al-Jiftlik

In recent years, the settlements has absorbed around 30 new families, mostly the children of the founding members.

== Economy ==
Most of the settlement's residents earn their living from agriculture. The younger members work in both agriculture and other jobs.

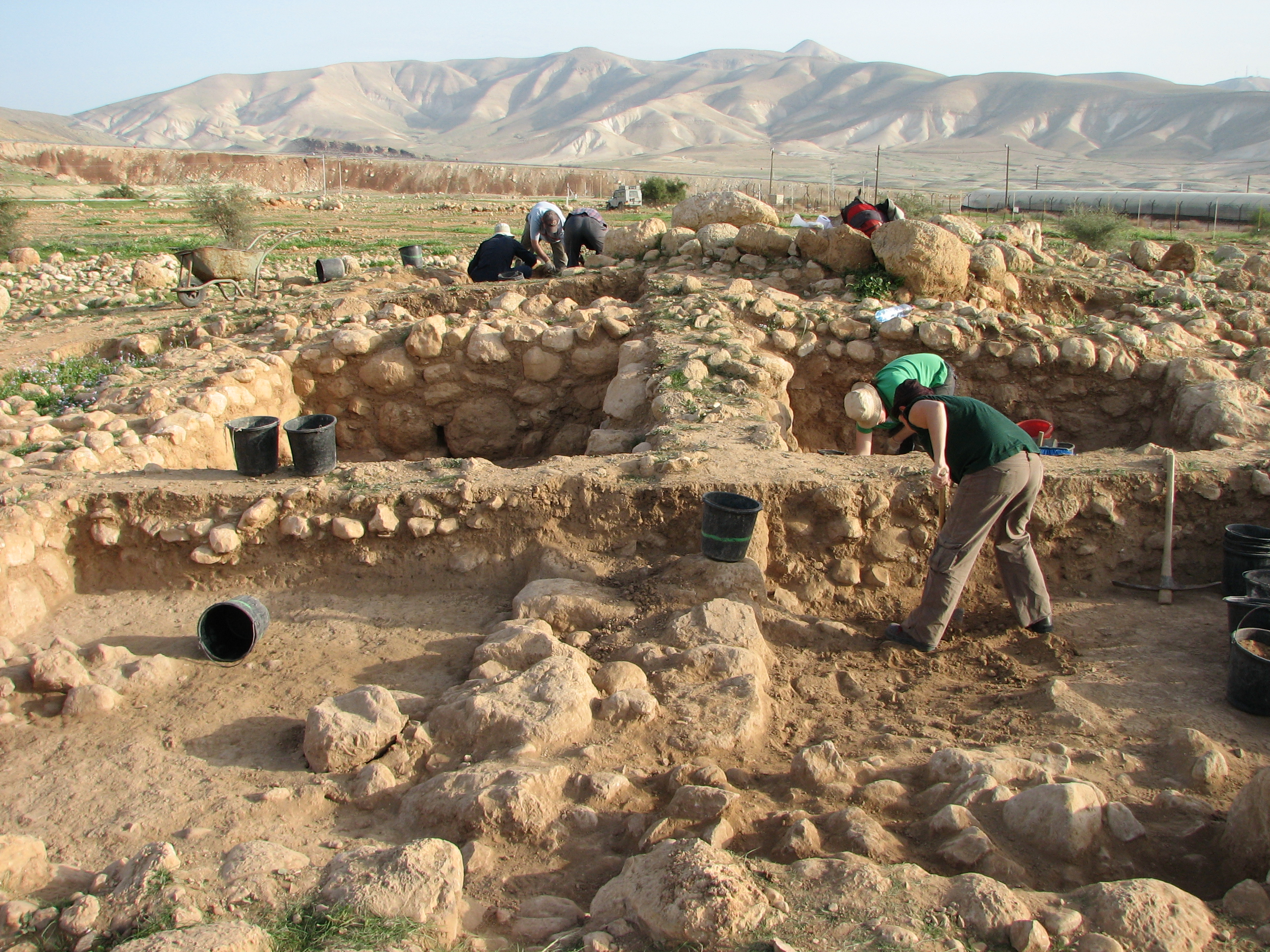
Archaeological dig on the outskirts of Petza'el

In the 2013 the settlement had 3,960 dunams of cultivated land, of which 2,700 dunams was used for date palms, 800 for vineyards, 400 for vegetables (mostly peppers) and 60 for flowers. Most of the agricultural output is designated for export. There are conflicting views about the builder of a race track near the settlement. Haaretz reported the illegal race track was built by the Bik'at HaYarden Regional Council by using public funds.

== Community and civic services ==
The settlement operates two kindergartens, several clubs for the members, a synagogue, pool, grocery store and recreation sites. Some of the electricity is created by solar panels in the settlements and some residents also use solar panels for their personal use.

== Settler violence committed by residents ==
In June 2026, Israeli settlers from Petza'el began to restore and develop the nearby archeological site Herod's Pool. Later that month, they destroyed the water irrigation systems for agriculture from a spring owned by a Palestinian farmer in Fasayil and diverted the water into the pool. This cut-off the water supply of the farmer. Potential damage to the archeological site was raised by an archeologist. In addition, there was also damage to the regulated water infrastructure according to Israeli Civil Administration. Even though the Israeli civil administration acknowledged the ownership of the spring by the Palestinian farmer of Fasayil, Bezalel Smotrich declared that 3 million shekels would be invested into developing the pool into a public and tourist spot. According to the owner of the spring at Fasayil, The empty pool was requested by Palestinian locals to refill with water, but this was denied.
