= Harasha =

Israeli settlement in the West Bank

Coordinates: 31°56′40″N 35°8′58″E

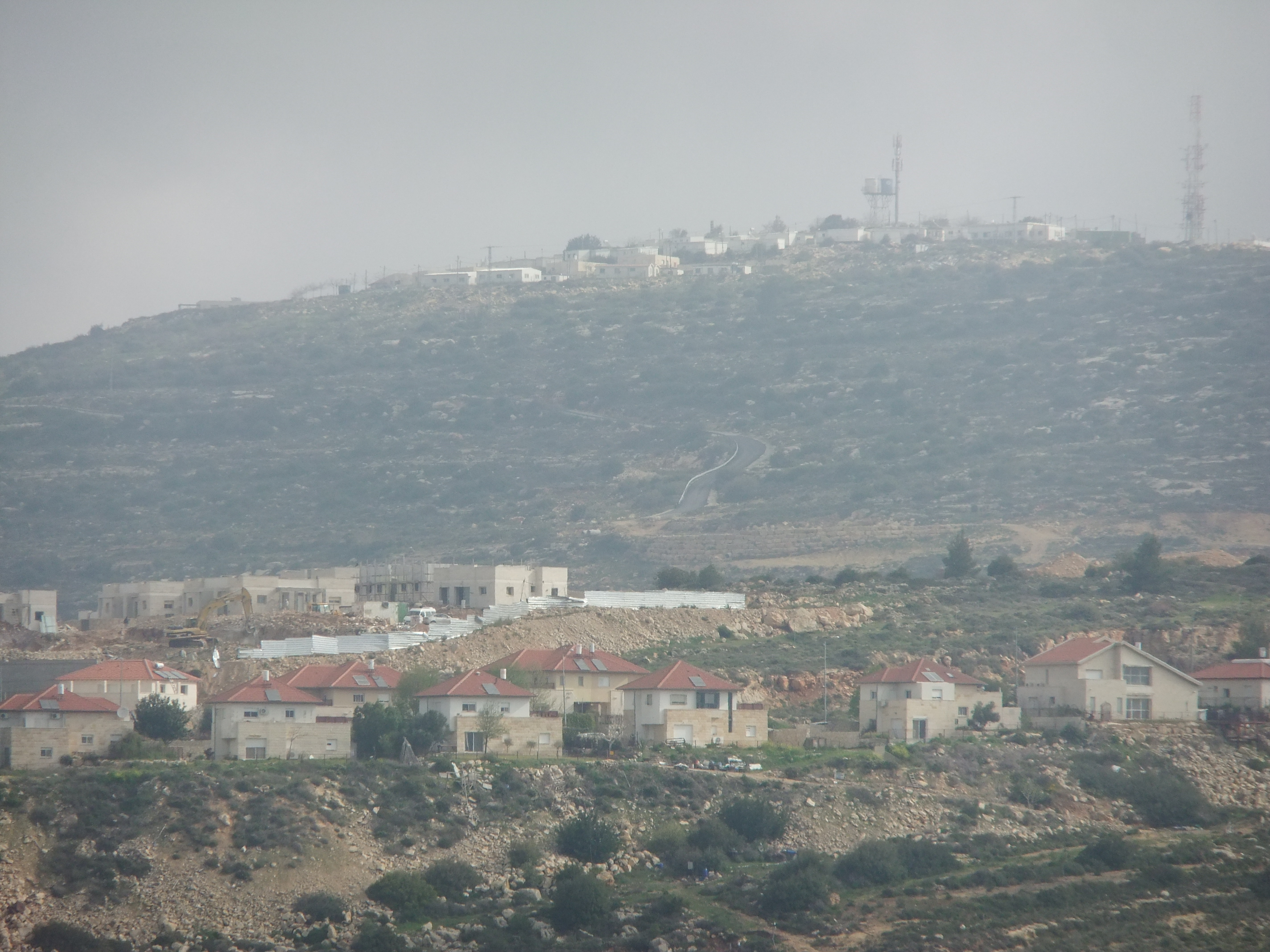
Harasha on the top of the mountain. Below is Neve Talmon. The picture was taken from Dolev.

Harasha, or Haresha (Hebrew: חרשה), is an Israeli settlement in the northern section of the West Bank, located in the Dolev region near Talmon. At 770 metres, the view from the village reaches Hadera in the northwest, Ashkelon in the southwest, and Jerusalem in the east.

The international community considers Israeli settlements in the West Bank illegal under international law, but the Israeli government disputes this.

== History ==
Harasha was established on 14 January 1999 by two students from Mercaz haRav with assistance from the Amana settlement organization. The name is taken from a Bible verse, mentioning Jews returning from different places in the Babylonian exile (Nehemiah 7:61: "The following came up from the towns of Tel Melah, Tel Harasha ...").

A year earlier, a water tower had been erected on the hilltop which until then had treeless rocky ground. Ariel Sharon would bring visitors to the hilltop to explain the importance of Israeli control over the West Bank ridges.

About 35 families, including over 200 people, live in Harasha. The occupation of most of the adults is in education, either studying or teaching. The local public services provided include a synagogue, a kollel, a mikvah, nurseries and kindergartens. The village receives its municipal services from the Matte Binyamin Regional Council.

According to the Sasson report, Haresha is an unauthorized settlement. In April 2010 National Infrastructure Minister Uzi Landau called for its legalization.

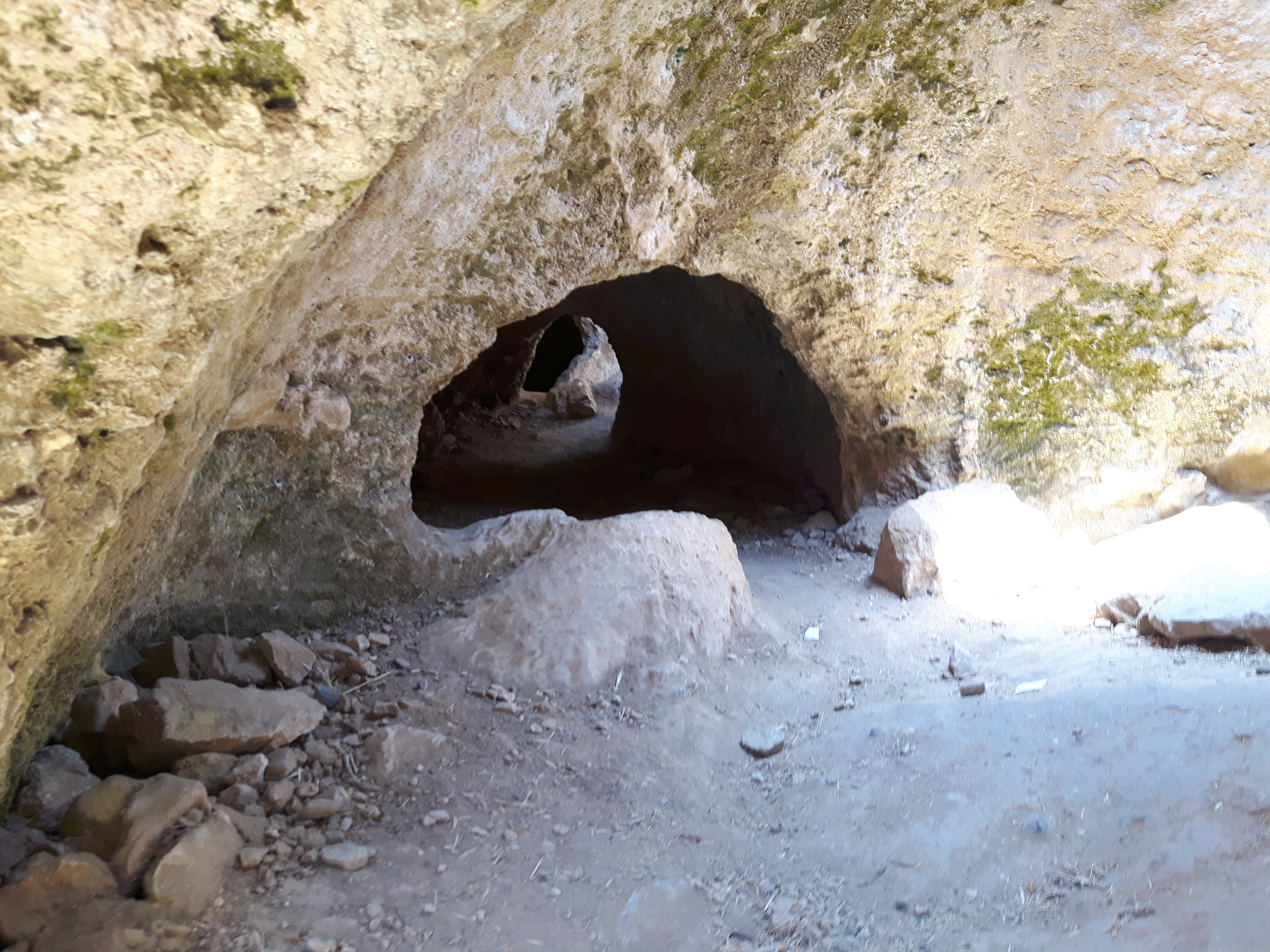
Inside view of First Temple period rock-hewn, bell-shaped caves (wine cellars) of the Gibeon type, on the eastern side of Wineries Hill/Sheikh 'Aisa between Talmon and Harasha, once used by the inhabitants of the Judahite village there to store wine and oil. The tunnels between the caves were built and used during the Bar Kokhba revolt.

On March 22, 2025, the Israeli government legalized Harasha.
