= Neria (Israeli settlement) =

Israeli settlement in the West Bank

Neria: נריה (Hebrew); نيريا (Arabic)
- Location within the Central West Bank Location within the West Bank Location within State of Palestine
- Coordinates: 31°57′12″N 35°7′33″E
- Country: Palestine
- District: Judea and Samaria Area
- Council: Mateh Binyamin
- Region: West Bank
- Founded: 1991

Neria (Hebrew: נֵרִיָּה, Arabic: نيريا, romanized: Nariyā), also known as Talmon Tzafon (Hebrew: טַלְמוֹן צָפוֹן, lit. 'North Talmon') or Talmon Bet (Hebrew: טַלְמוֹן ב', lit. 'Talmon B'), is a national-religious Israeli settlement in the West Bank, officially recognised by the Israeli government as a "neighborhood" of Talmon. It sits between Modi'in Illit and Ramallah, is organised as a community settlement and falls under the jurisdiction of Mateh Binyamin Regional Council. It has a population of around 300 families. The international community considers Israeli settlements in the West Bank illegal under international law, but the Israeli government disputes this.

The village was established in 1991 by a number of families who had met at Mercaz HaRav yeshiva, and was named after Rabbi Moshe-Zvi Neria. The community is led by spiritual leader Rabbi Michael Hershkovitz, a current teacher at Mercaz HaRav.
