= Tomer (Israeli settlement) =

Israeli settlement in the West Bank

Tomer: תֹּמֶר, תומר (Hebrew)
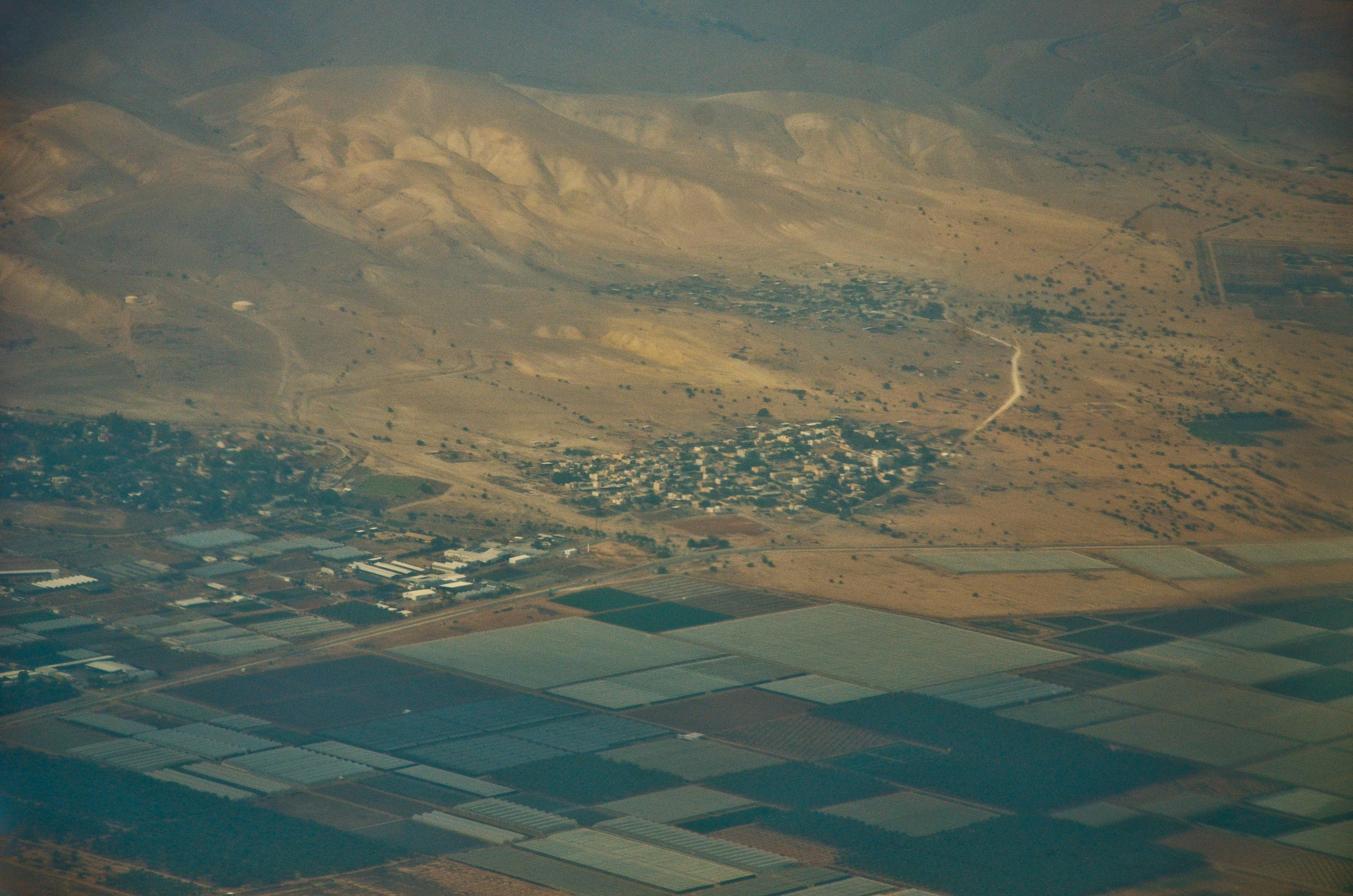
- Tomer (left) next to Fasayil (right)
- Etymology: Palm Tree
- Location within the Central West Bank Location within Israel Location within the West Bank
- Coordinates: 32°1′7″N 35°26′20″E
- Country: Palestine
- District: Judea and Samaria Area
- Council: Bik'at HaYarden
- Region: West Bank
- Affiliation: Moshavim Movement
- Founded: 1976
- Population (2024): 444

Tomer (Hebrew: תֹּמֶר, lit. 'Palm Tree') is an Israeli settlement organized as a moshav in the West Bank. Located in the Jordan Valley next to the Palestinian village of Fasayil, it falls under the jurisdiction of Bik'at HaYarden Regional Council. In 2024 it had a population of 444.

The international community considers Israeli settlements in the West Bank illegal under international law. The Israeli government disputes this.

== History ==
According to ARIJ, Israel confiscated 1,049 dunams of land from the Palestinian village of Fasayil in order to construct Tomer.

The village was established in 1976, and was named after the trees common in the area. In March 1978 it moved to its present location near Highway 90.

Geert Wilders, the leader of the Dutch Party for Freedom, worked here as a Kibbutz volunteer in 1981.
