= Herod's Pool =

Herod's Pool is an archeological site believed to be about 2000 years old, located near the Israeli settlement Petza'el in Jordan Valley of West Bank. The pool and water from the spring that fills the pool is Palestinian-owned though it is currently seized by Israeli settlers. The site is in development and planned for public use and tourism after Israeli settlers diverted water from a spring owned and used by a Palestinian resident in the nearby village of Fasayil.

== History ==
The pool is believed to be a biblical-era pool associated with King Herod. According to archeologist Alon Arad of Emek Shaveh, this is not for certain. The pool is believed to be 2000 years old due to the type of stones at the bottom of the pool.

The pool sits on private land owned by Palestinian Saad Nemer. In the 1970s, his family excavated and cleaned the pool. It was open to the public for both Israelis and Palestinians to use during the summer for 15 years, but was then closed in mid-1990s due to drownings which raised concerns about liabilities.

In June 2026, Israeli teenagers began to restore the site as an independent volunteer initiative.

In that same month, Israeli settlers cut off the water supply of a spring owned by Saad Nemer, a Palestinian farmer in Fasayil, and diverted it to the pool.

Shortly after, Minister Amihai Eliyahu praised the volunteers and considered it part of the restoration of heritage sites in the “land of heritage program” which the government spent 250 million shekels on already. He also announced that 3 million shekels would by invested into developing the pool.

== Controversies ==
=== Human and legal rights issues ===
Allegations that systematic water theft by Arabs was the reason for far-right Knesset members Zvi Sukkot and Avihai Boaron leading the campaign. However, according to an announcement by COGAT, the existing agreements and arrangements show the water had been routed for agricultural uses in nearby areas. The diversion of water was also done without the approval and co-ordination with authorities, leading damage to the regulated infrastructure. They are currently reviewing how to proceed in regulating the flow of water in accordance with the law and binding agreements.

In an interview with Reuters, Nemer presented documents from COGAT dated in 2025 showing that his ownership in the land agreements included both the pool and the spring. He also presented the land deed and registration before occupation from 1957. He said as far as 2 years ago, settlers have violently prevented him and an employee from reaching his spring which provided water for his agriculture. As of date, he has no water and his spring has been seized. The expropriation of Palestinian springs in the West Bank in nearby villages have also been a regular occurrence.

Though the Israeli Civil Administration acknowledged his ownership and Nemer said they told him he could fix the pipe again, but he chose not to because settlers would attack it again.

In July Saad Nemer sought help from the Israeli civil administration, but they only said they would reconnect the pipe to bring water back to his land, but not evict the settlers from his land. Israeli forces then reconnected it, and acknowledged that the pool itself was on private land and that the water diversion was unauthorized. Water flowed back to his land for one day until it was sabotaged again.

=== Archeological preservation and historical accuracy ===
Israeli archeologist Alon Arad believes that filling the pool would cause damage to the structure of the site. He also questioned claims that pool was a Herod-era pool, and believes it is rather one built later for water storage.
