= David Melech Yisrael =

Jewish Song

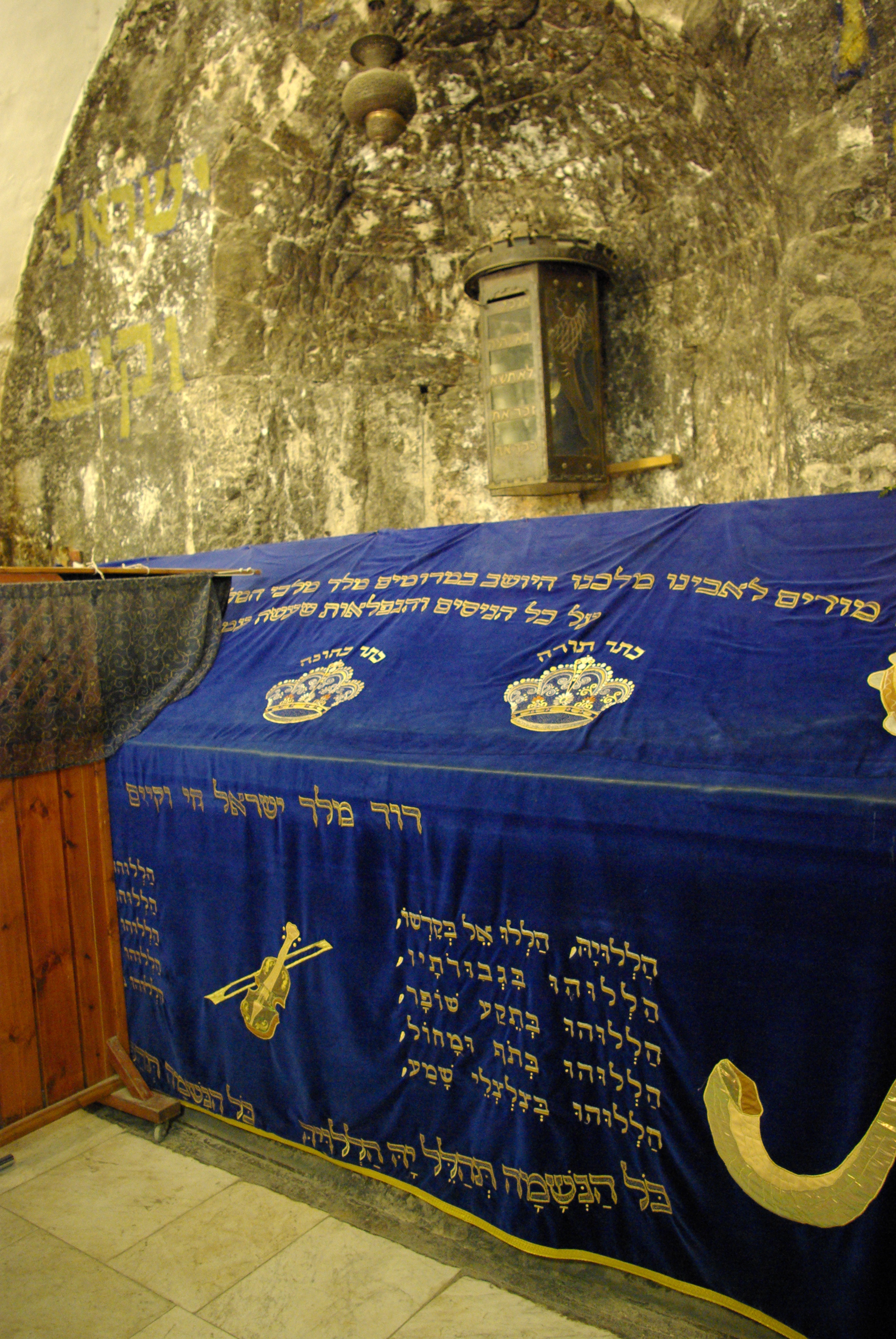
Tomb of king David

David Melech Yisrael (Hebrew: דוד מלך ישראל; literally, "David is the King of Israel") is a Jewish song referring to King David.

== Words ==
The song's lyrics are simple and consist of only five words, which are repeated many times in some tunes.

English:

David, king of Israel, lives and endures.

Hebrew transliteration:

David, melekh Yisra'el, Ḥai veqayam.

Hebrew:

דוד מלך ישראל חי וקיים

== Source ==
According to the Talmud, once in a time of persecution Jews were forbidden to announce the new month. Thus, Rabbi Judah HaNasi instructed Rabbi Hiyya to use the phrase "David, king of Israel, lives and endures" as a coded message indicating that the new moon has appeared.

The comparison between "David" and the new moon is based in Psalms 89:36–38, where God promises that the Davidic monarchy will be "established forever like the moon".

In addition, the history of the Jewish people is said to parallel the lunar cycle. Fifteen generations passed from Abraham to Solomon, paralleling the waxing of the moon. Similarly, fifteen generations passed between Solomon and the Babylonian exile, paralleling the waning of the moon. Just as the moon returns after disappearing during the new moon, Jews expect that Jewish fortunes will be revived with the coming of the Messiah.
