= Fasayil =

- Municipality type D (Village council)

Arabic transcription(s)
  - Arabic: فصايل
  - Latin: al-Fasa'il (official); Khirbet al-Fasayil (unofficial)
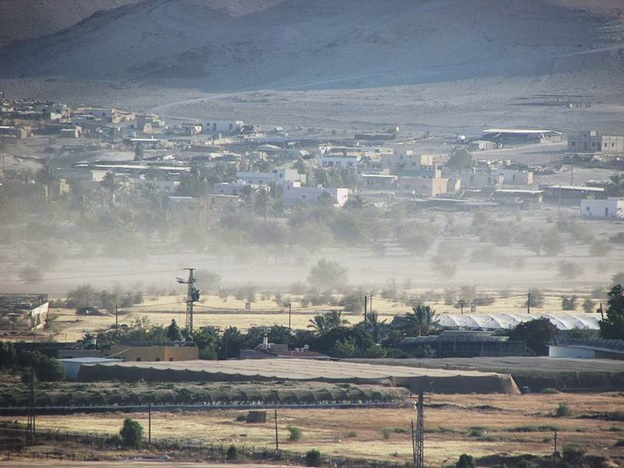
- View of Fasayil al-Fauqa (north Fasayil), 2014
- Interactive map of Fasayil
- Location of Fasayil within Palestine
- Coordinates: 32°01′30″N 35°26′36″E
- Palestine grid: 192/161
- State: State of Palestine
- Governorate: Jericho

Government
  - Type: Village council

Population (2017)
  - Total: 1,637

Fasayil or Fasa'il (Arabic: فصايل), ancient Phasaelis, is a Palestinian village in the northeastern West Bank, a part of the Jericho Governorate, located 14 kilometres (8.7 mi) northwest of Jericho and about 40 kilometres (25 mi) southeast of Nablus. The closest Palestinian locality is Duma to the west. The village is located 2 km south of the Israeli settlement of Petza'el. According to the 2017 census by the Palestinian Central Bureau of Statistics (PCBS), the village had a population of 1,637.

== History and archaeology ==
=== Roman and Byzantine periods ===
In 8 BCE, Herod the Great, King of Judea, established a new city in the Jordan Valley north of Jericho, which he named Phasaelis (Ancient Greek: Φασαηλίς, Phasaēlís), in dedication to his elder brother Phasael. The remains of Phasaelis were identified in the 19th century with the ruins field called by local Arabs Khirbet Fasayil, with a tell (mound) called Tell Fasayil possibly corresponding to a Byzantine monastery.

Flavius Josephus writes about the establishment of Phasaelis south of Archelais and describes it as part of a toparchy ruled by Herod's sister, Salome I. The city is also found on the 6th-century Madaba Map, surrounded by date palms. In her will, Salome left Fasayil to Livia, (the wife of the Roman emperor), so after year 10CE, the village belonged to the Emperor's domain.

The tomb of an anchorite named Peter was found in the village in 1949. The ruins of a monastery dedicated to Saint Cyriacus, a commemorated monk who died in 556, is also located in Fasayil. Among the ruins on the site is a large square building, of which in modern times only the outline was visible, because it was almost completely buried. At the mouth of the nearby Wadi al-Fasayil, at a little mound, there is a birkeh ("pool") and many unexcavated remains of walls. The site is called Tell Sheikh ad-Diab after the tomb of a Muslim holy man by this name, still in good condition.

=== Early Muslim period ===
A stone found at Fasayil commemorates a building project there dedicated to Khumarawayh ibn Ahmad ibn Tulun. It must have been started either during his rule, or the rule of his son, Abu 'l-Asakir Jaysh ibn Khumarawayh, that is between 884 and 896 CE.

An aqueduct and a mill, that dated from the early Islamic era, was possibly still in use in the 12th century.

=== Crusader period ===
It was mentioned by a monk named Brocardus in the 13th century as being a small village called Pheselch and in the 14th century by Marino Sanuto as being a small village by the name of Fasaelis.

=== Late Ottoman period ===
Victor Guérin visited in 1870, and found the place in ruins. In 1874, the PEF's Survey of Western Palestine expedition visited and described the extensive ruins there.

=== British Mandate period ===
In the tables of the 1931 census, the population of Fasayil was included with that of Aqraba, as it also was in the 1945 statistics.

=== Jordanian period ===
The Jordanian census of 1961 recorded 318 residents.

=== After 1967 ===
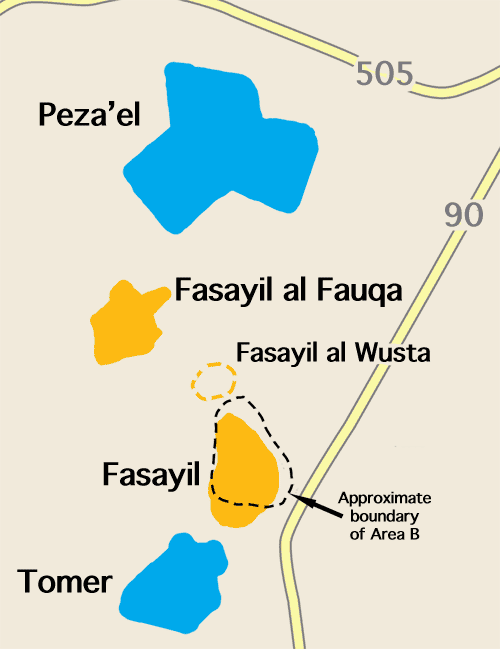
Fasayil with nearby Israeli settlements

Since the Six-Day War in 1967, Fasayil has been under Israeli occupation.

== Village sections, inhabitants and administration ==
Modern-day Fasayil consists of three parts: Fasayil al-Tahta ('Lower Fasayil'), Fasayil al-Fauqa ('Upper Fasayil') and Fasayil al-Wusta. The latter was established in 1998 by Bedouins who had been evicted by the Israeli authorities from their original lands in the Tel Arad region of the Negev Desert in the 1940s and 1950s. Many of the inhabitants are registered as residents of the Bethlehem Governorate and not Jericho. Fasayil was part of the Nablus Governorate until 1995 when it became a part of the Jericho Governorate.

== Land confiscation and house demolishions ==
According to ARIJ, Israel has confiscated land from Fasayil in order to build four Israeli settlements:

- 1,049 dunams of land were taken for Tomer,
- 858 dunams were taken for Gilgal,
- 1,242 dunams were taken for Peza’el,
- 215 dunams were taken for Nativ HaGdud.

In 2006, Israeli authorities demolished 15 shelters in Fasayil al-Wusta, and in 2008 an additional 6 were demolished. Fasayil gained international attention when in 2007 the Israel Defense Forces planned on demolishing the village's primary school. Since Fasayil al-Wusta is located in Area C of the West Bank, Israel has complete control over that part of the village, and granting building permits are authorized by them; the school was built without a permit. Residents often complain about the rarity of Israel permitting construction in Fasayil al-Wusta.

In June 2026, Israeli settlers from Petza'el seized a Palestinian-owned spring and destroyed the water irrigation system for surrounding agriculture. The water was then diverted into development and restoration of Herod's Pool. Despite land documents acknowledged by the Israeli Civil Administration of Palestinian ownership, finance minister Bezalel Smotrich announced an investment of 3 million shekels into the pool's development.

== Demographics ==
In the tables of the 1931 census, the population of Fasayil was included with that of Aqraba, as it also was in the 1945 statistics. The Jordanian census of 1961 recorded 318 residents.

In a census conducted by Israel after it occupied the West Bank in the 1967 Six-Day War, Fasayil was reported to have 422 residents in 92 households, including 257 persons in 53 households whose head was a refugee from Israeli territory.

According to a census taken by the Palestinian Central Bureau of Statistics, Fasayil had a population of 648 in 1997, of which 31% were refugees fleeing other parts of the West Bank in the 1967 Six-Day War. The gender make-up was approximately 50% male and 50% female.

There were 1,078 inhabitants and 214 buildings in the 2007 census.

== Bibliography ==
- Conder, C.R.; Kitchener, H.H. (1882). The Survey of Western Palestine: Memoirs of the Topography, Orography, Hydrography, and Archaeology. Vol. 2. London: Committee of the Palestine Exploration Fund. (said to be haunted: p. 404)
- Government of Jordan, Department of Statistics (1964). First Census of Population and Housing. Volume I: Final Tables; General Characteristics of the Population (PDF).
- Government of Palestine, Department of Statistics (1945). Village Statistics, April, 1945.
- Guérin, V. (1874). Description Géographique Historique et Archéologique de la Palestine (in French). Vol. 2: Samarie, pt. 1. Paris: L'Imprimerie Nationale.
- Hadawi, S. (1970). Village Statistics of 1945: A Classification of Land and Area ownership in Palestine. Palestine Liberation Organization Research Center.
- Israel Central Bureau of Statistics (1967–1970). Joel Perlmann (ed.). "The 1967 Census of the West Bank and Gaza Strip: A Digitized Version". Levy Economics Institute of Bard College, 2011–2012. Volume 1, Table 2.
- Mills, E., ed. (1932). Census of Palestine 1931. Population of Villages, Towns and Administrative Areas. Jerusalem: Government of Palestine.
- Palmer, E.H. (1881). The Survey of Western Palestine: Arabic and English Name Lists Collected During the Survey by Lieutenants Conder and Kitchener, R. E. Transliterated and Explained by E.H. Palmer. Committee of the Palestine Exploration Fund. (p. 255 )
- Pringle, D. (1997). Secular buildings in the Crusader Kingdom of Jerusalem: an archaeological Gazetter. Cambridge University Press. ISBN 0521 46010 7.
- Sharon, M. (2004). Corpus Inscriptionum Arabicarum Palaestinae, D-F. Vol. 3. BRILL. ISBN 90-04-13197-3.
