= Talmon =

Israeli settlement in the West Bank

Talmon: טַלְמוֹן (Hebrew)
- Israeli settlement
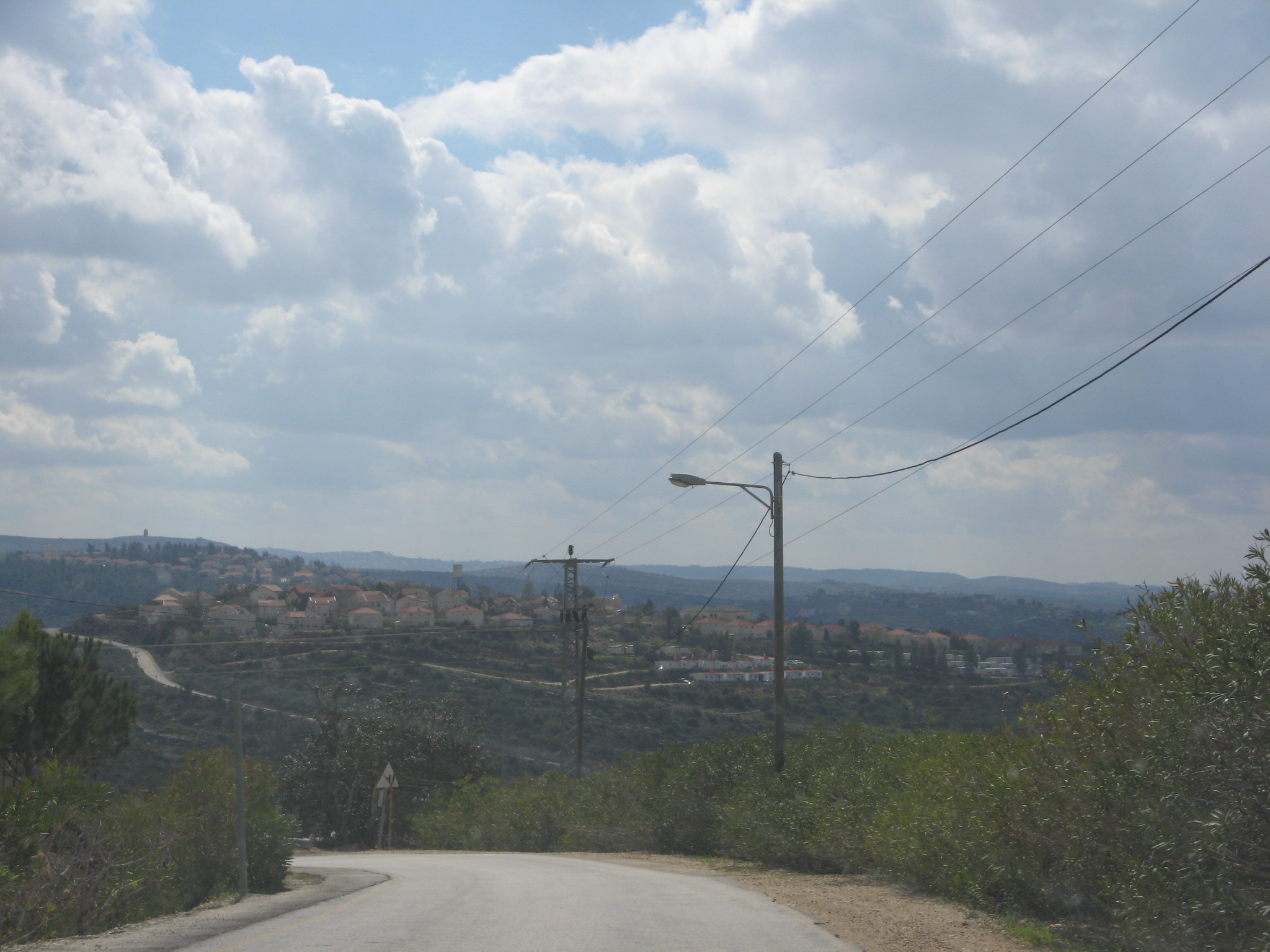
- Talmon taken from Neria

- Location within the Central West Bank
- Coordinates: 31°56′18″N 35°8′6″E
- Country: Palestine
- District: Judea and Samaria Area
- Council: Mateh Binyamin
- Region: West Bank
- Founded: 1989
- Population (2024): 6,039

Talmon (Hebrew: טַלְמוֹן) is an Israeli settlement in the West Bank located 8 km from Ramallah, next to the Palestinian villages of Al-Janiya, Al-Ittihad, and Al-Zaitounah – part of whose lands were confiscated for the construction of Talmon. The international community considers Israeli settlements in the West Bank illegal under international law, but the Israeli government disputes this.

Located at an elevation of nearly 600 metres and 18 km east of Modiin, it is organised as a community settlement and falls under the jurisdiction of Mateh Binyamin Regional Council. It was established in 1989 and in 2024 it had a population of 6,039.

== History ==
According to the Applied Research Institute–Jerusalem, Israel confiscated land from various different Palestinian villages in order to construct Talmon, including:

- taking land from private Palestinians citizens of Al-Janiya,
- land confiscated from the town of Al-Ittihad,
- in addition to 289 dunams confiscated from Al-Zaitounah.

Talmon was founded in 1989, with the name taken from the family name of the family of gatekeepers of the Temple in Jerusalem who returned to rebuild Jerusalem during the time of Nehemiah.

The settlement of Neria was originally built on land designated for Talmon, but it is now independent.

== Voting patterns ==
In the 2022 election, 94 percent of voters in Talmon voted for the parties of the right-wing coalition led by Benjamin Netanyahu, while 1 percent voted for the parties of the center-left coalition led by Yair Lapid. 85 percent of voters voted for the Religious Zionist Party-Otzma Yehudit list. The Arab parties did not receive any votes.

In the 2026 election, 92 percent of voters in Talmon voted for the parties of the right-wing coalition led by Benjamin Netanyahu, while 2 percent voted for the parties of the center-left coalition led by Gadi Eisenkot. An additional 0.9 percent voted for the Reservists, and 2.5 percent voted for Amcha Yisrael. The Arab parties did not receive any votes. 75 percent of voters voted for the Religious Zionist Party. Voter turnout increased 21 percent from the 2022 election.

== Notable residents ==
- Gilad Sha'er, 16-year-old killed in the 2014 kidnapping and murder of Israeli teenagers

== See also ==
- Harasha or Haresha, nearby Israeli settlement. Between Talmon and Harasha lies the First Temple-, Roman- (Bar Kokhba revolt), and Byzantine-period site of Wineries Hill/Sheikh 'Aisa.
