= Nahliel =

Israeli settlement in the West Bank

Nahliel: נַחֲלִיאֵל (Hebrew)
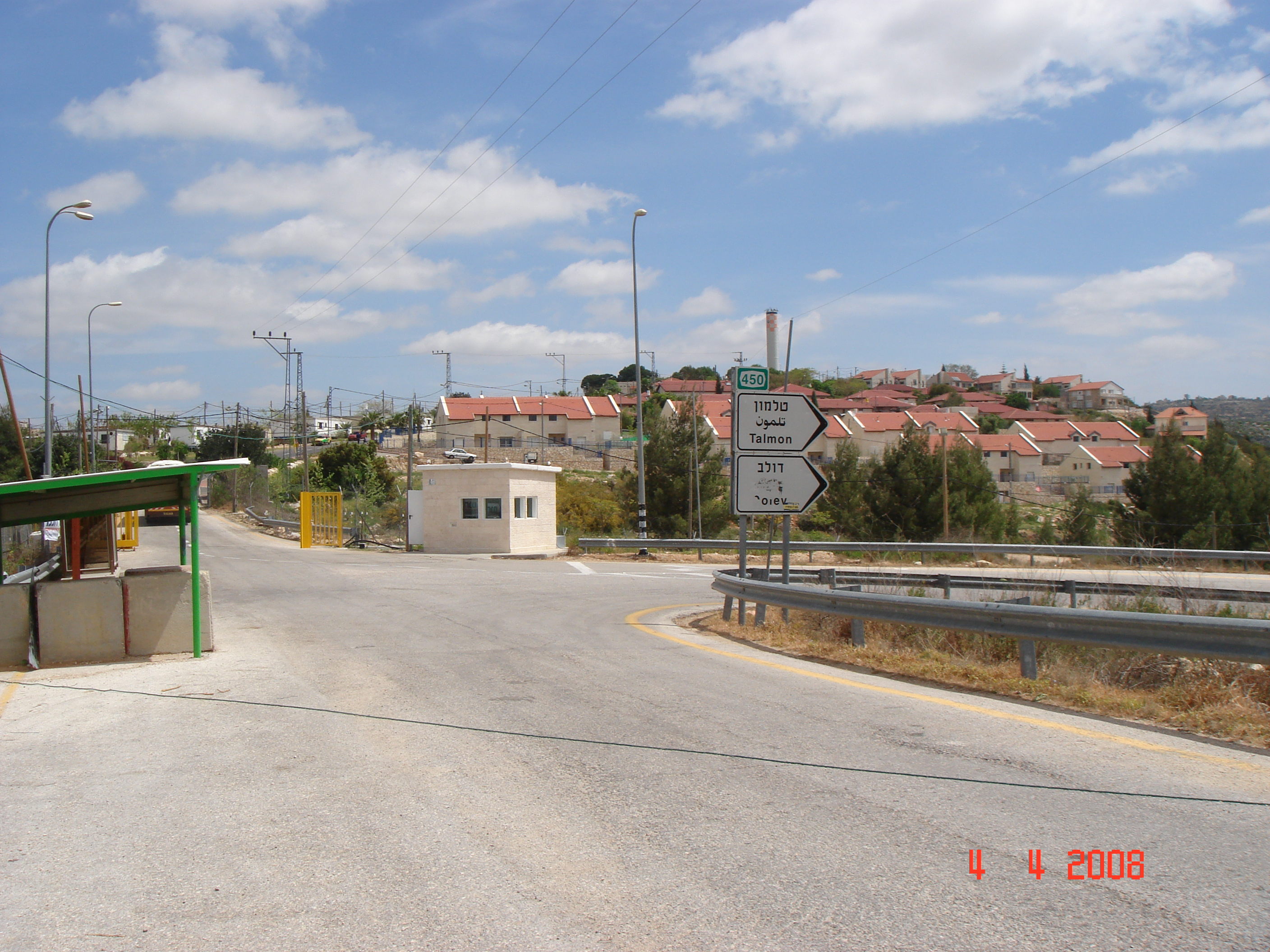

- Location within the Central West Bank
- Coordinates: 31°58′26″N 35°8′24″E
- Country: Palestine
- District: Judea and Samaria Area
- Council: Mateh Binyamin
- Region: West Bank
- Affiliation: Poalei Agudat Yisrael
- Founded: October 1984
- Founder: Poalei Agudat Yisrael
- Population (2024): 798

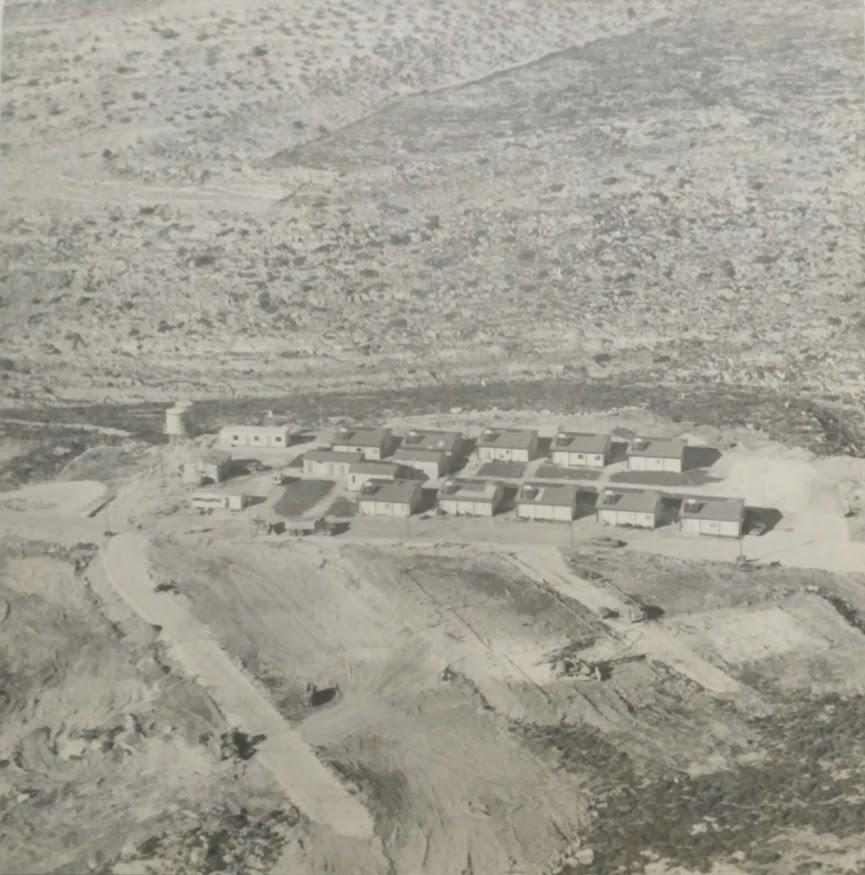
Aerial photo of Nahliel - Beginning of first permanent housing 1986

Nahliel (Hebrew: נַחֲלִיאֵל) is a Haredi Israeli settlement in the West Bank. Located close to the Palestinian villages of Beitillu and Deir 'Ammar, and some 20 kilometres (12 mi) from Modi'in, it is organised as a community settlement and falls under the jurisdiction of the Mateh Binyamin Regional Council. In 2024 it had a population of 798.

The international community considers Israeli settlements in the West Bank illegal under international law, but the Israeli government disputes this.

== History ==
The settlement was established in October 1984 by the Poalei Agudat Yisrael movement, and was named after the biblical city of Nahaliel and a book by Isaac Breuer, the founder of Poalei Agudat Yisrael. According to ARIJ, Nahliel was built on land confiscated from two Palestinian towns; 396 dunams from al-Ittihad and 19 dunams from al-Zaitounah. Most of the founders were members of the religious youth movement Ezra. The settlers initially lived in ten temporary houses that were not connected to electricity or water supplies. A trailer carrying water was delivered each day for several weeks until a water tower was erected, which was also supplied by a daily delivery. A minimal supply of electricity was provided by a tiny generator that the builders left for their use during the night. Until the start of the First Intifada in 1987, relationships between the settlers and residents of surrounding Palestinian villages were positive, with Palestinians visiting the settlement and settlers using the shops in the adjacent villages.

During the Second Intifada, two Israeli women were ambushed and wounded by Palestinians near Nahliel. In March 2005 a group of 30 to 40 Jewish seminary students used clubs and stones to beat eight Palestinian men employed in Nahliel as they were entering the settlement. Dror Etkes of Peace Now, writing in 2005, stated that some of the residents were "radical settlers" on the fringes of ultra-Orthodox society, making it atypical among the ultra-Orthodox settlements.

North and east of Nahliel are lands belonging to the Palestinians of the village of Beitillu, whose residents are only allowed to work on their orchards for a few days a year. Significant damage to the Palestinian olive groves adjacent to the settlement was caused in 2012, but the culprits were unknown. The area is surrounded by barbed wire.

== Archaeology ==
Within the area of the settlement there are two ancient burial caves, probably dating back to the period of the Second Temple. Just outside Nachliel there is an area marked on maps as the remains of a Jewish village called Kfar Sum, including remains of several houses, a mosaic floor and several signs of a well developed olive oil and wine industry.
