= Khirbet Safa =

- Municipality type D (Village council)

Arabic transcription(s)
  - Arabic: خربة صافا
  - Latin: Safa (official)
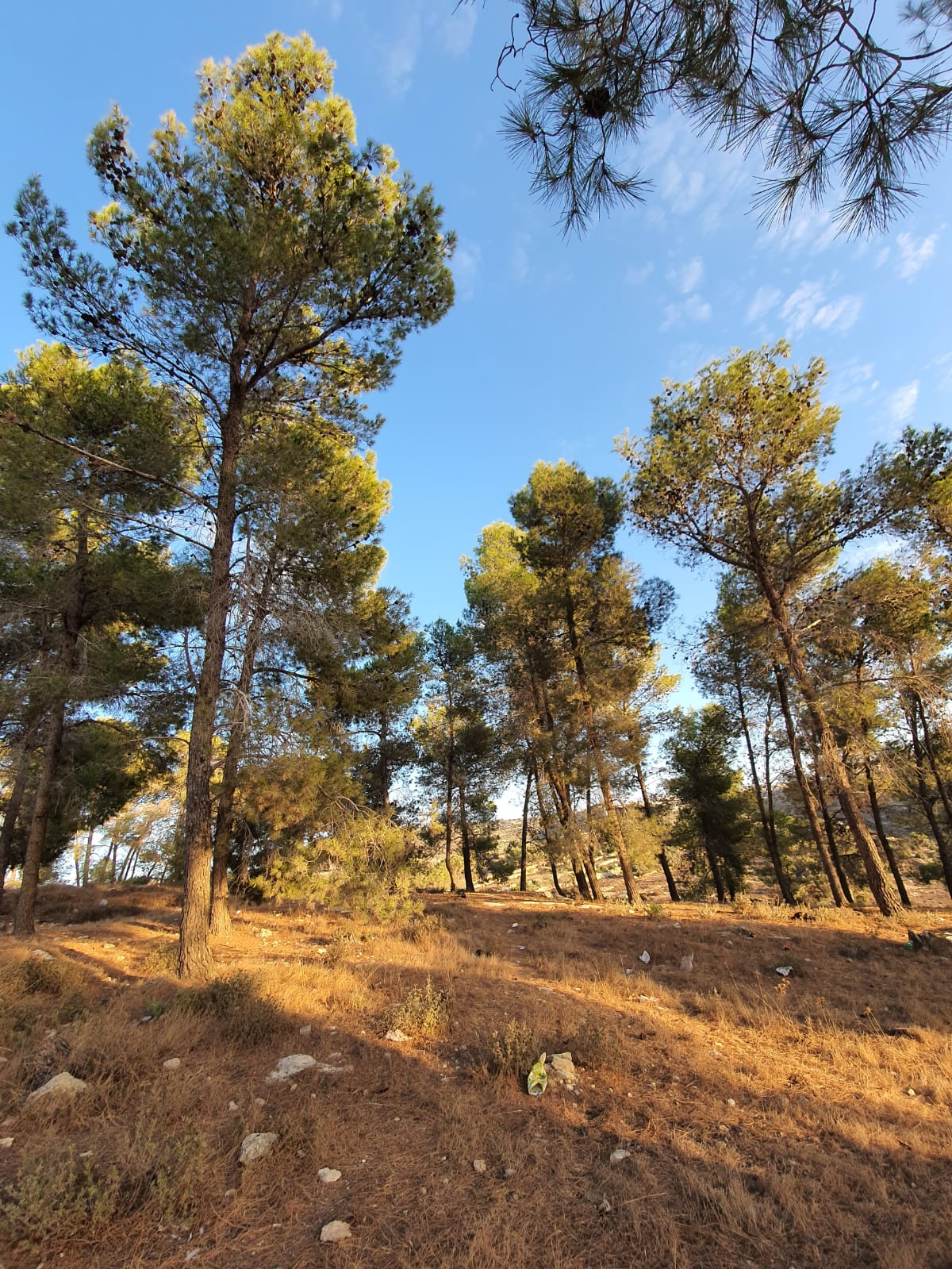

- Location of Khirbet Safa within Palestine
- Coordinates: 31°38′32″N 35°06′02″E
- State: State of Palestine
- Governorate: Hebron

Government
  - Type: Village council

Population (2006)
  - Total: 1,105
- Name meaning: "clear", or "bright"

Khirbet Safa (Arabic: خربة صافا) is a Palestinian village located twelve kilometers north-west of Hebron. The village is in the Hebron Governorate Southern West Bank. According to the Palestinian Central Bureau of Statistics, the village had a population of 1,105 in mid-year 2006.

== History ==
In 1883 the PEF's Survey of Western Palestine described it as "a small village, with a well to the north, on the west slope just below the watershed."

== Bibliography ==
- Conder, C.R.; Kitchener, H.H. (1883). The Survey of Western Palestine: Memoirs of the Topography, Orography, Hydrography, and Archaeology. Vol. 3. London: Committee of the Palestine Exploration Fund.
- Palmer, E.H. (1881). The Survey of Western Palestine: Arabic and English Name Lists Collected During the Survey by Lieutenants Conder and Kitchener, R. E. Transliterated and Explained by E.H. Palmer. Committee of the Palestine Exploration Fund.
