= List of terrorist incidents in 2019 =

This is a list of terrorist incidents which took place in 2019, including attacks by violent non-state actors for political motives. Note that terrorism related to drug wars and cartel violence is not included in these lists. Ongoing military conflicts are listed separately.

== Guidelines ==
- To be included, entries must be notable (have a stand-alone article) and described by a consensus of reliable sources as "terrorism".
- List entries must comply with the guidelines outlined in the manual of style under MOS:TERRORIST.
- Casualties figures in this list are the total casualties of the incident including immediate casualties and later casualties (such as people who succumbed to their wounds long after the attacks occurred).
- Casualties listed are the victims. Perpetrator casualties are listed separately (e.g. x (+y) indicate that x victims and y perpetrators were killed/injured).
- Casualty totals may be underestimated or unavailable due to a lack of information. A figure with a plus (+) sign indicates that at least that many people have died (e.g. 10+ indicates that at least 10 people have died) – the actual toll could be considerably higher. A figure with a plus (+) sign may also indicate that over that number of people are victims.
- If casualty figures are 20 or more, they will be shown in **bold**. In addition, figures for casualties more than 50 will also be **underlined**.
- Incidents are limited to one per location per day. If multiple attacks occur in the same place on the same day, they will be merged into a single incident.
- In addition to the guidelines above, the table also includes the following categories:

0 people were killed/injured by the incident.
1–19 people were killed/injured by the incident.
20–49 people were killed/injured by the incident.
50–99 people were killed/injured by the incident.
100+ people were killed/injured by the incident.

== List ==
Total incidents: 69

Date	Type	Dead	Injured	Location	Article	Details	Perpetrator	Part of
15 January	Suicide bombing, shootings, hostage taking	22 (+5)	30	Nairobi, Kenya	2019 Nairobi hotel attack	At least one suicide bomber stormed the luxury complex DusitD2 hotel and detonated his explosives. Several gunmen took hostages and attacked the hotel with firearms.	Al-Shabaab	Terrorism in Kenya
16 January	Suicide Bombing	19 (+1)	3	Manbij, Syria	2019 Manbij bombing	The US military announced four personnel were among the dead.	Islamic State	Syrian Civil War
17 January	Suicide car bombing	21 (+1)	68	Bogotá, Colombia	2019 Bogotá car bombing	A car bomb entered a police school compound and detonated after hitting a wall.	José Aldemar Rodríguez, aka Mocho Kiko (ELN)	Colombian conflict
21 January	Suicide car bombing, shooting	36–190 (+3)	58–70	Maidan Shar, Afghanistan	Maidan Shar attack	Attacked on a military checkpoint. The assault begun when an attacker rammed a vehicle full of explosives in the compound, then two other attackers stormed the compound and opened gunfire, before being killed. NDS' reports however showed only 36 killed and 58 injured.	Taliban	War in Afghanistan
27 January	Bombings	20 (+2)	102	Jolo, Sulu, Philippines	2019 Jolo Cathedral bombings	Two bombs exploded in a cathedral during Sunday mass.	Abu Sayyaf	Moro conflict
29 January	Suicide bombings, shooting, grenade attack	9 (+3)	22	Loralai, Pakistan	2019 Loralai attack	Gunmen and suicide bombers attacked a Deputy Inspector General (DIG) office.	Tehrik-i-Taliban Pakistan	War in North-West Pakistan
4 February	Car bombing	11	10	Mogadishu, Somalia	4 February 2019 Mogadishu bombing	Car bombing at a shopping mall.	Al-Shabaab	Somali Civil War
11 February	Shooting	141	Unknown	Kajuru, Nigeria	2019 Kaduna State massacre	An attack on the Adara settlement of Ungwar Bardi by suspected Fulani gunmen killed 11. Reprisal attack by an Adara militia targeted settlements of the Fulani. The death toll rose to 141 a few days later with 11 Adara and 130 Fulani dying per the government. The governor spoke that the motive was to destroy specific communities. The attacks took place in Kajuru LGA of Kaduna State. Miyetti Allah was reported to have published a list of 131 dead, but later clarified that 66 Fulani were buried and 65 remain missing.	Fulani gunmen (suspected) and Adara militia	Communal conflicts in Nigeria Herder–farmer conflicts in Nigeria
13 February	Suicide car bombing	27 (+1)	13	Sistan and Baluchestan Province, Iran	Iran Khash-Zahedan suicide bombing	A suicide car bomb attack on a bus carrying paramilitary revolutionary guard soldiers.	Jaysh al-Adl	Sistan and Baluchestan insurgency
14 February	Suicide car bombing	40 (+1)	35	Pulwama, Jammu & Kashmir, India	2019 Pulwama attack	Personnel of the Central Reserve Police Force (CRPF) were killed when a suicide car bomber rammed an explosive laden vehicle on a convoy in the Pulwama District. Several other vehicles were damaged.	Jaish-e-Mohammed	Insurgency in Jammu and Kashmir
17 February	Shooting	6-9	15	Turbat, Pakistan	2019 Balochistan attack	Six to nine Frontier Corps personnel were killed and several others were injured in a shooting attack.	Baloch Raji Ajoi Sangar	Insurgency in Balochistan
24 February	Attempted hijacking	0 (+1)	1	Bangladesh	Biman Bangladesh Airlines Flight 147	A man who wanted to speak with Prime Minister Sheikh Hasina tried to hijack the aircraft and was shot dead by special forces. A flight attendant was injured.	Mohammed Polash Ahmed	Terrorism in Bangladesh
28 February	Suicide car bombings, shooting, grenade attack	30+ (+2)	60+	Mogadishu, Somalia	28 February 2019 Mogadishu bombings	Two suicide car bomb blasts near a hotel in a busy street.	Al-Shabaab	Somali civil war
15 March	Mass shooting	51	40	Christchurch, New Zealand	Christchurch mosque shootings	An Australian self-described "Ethno-nationalist, Eco-fascist", "racist" terrorist, opened fire on Muslim worshipers attending Friday Prayer at Al Noor Mosque and Linwood Islamic Centre, livestreaming the attack on Facebook Live.	Brenton Harrison Tarrant	Terrorism in New Zealand; Far-right terrorism
17 March	Stabbing, shooting	2	1	Ariel, West Bank	2019 Samaria combined attack	Two people, including a rabbi, were killed when a Palestinian gunman opened fire after fatally stabbing a soldier. Another soldier was seriously injured.	Palestinian nationalist	Israeli–Palestinian conflict
18 March	Shooting	4	2	Utrecht, Netherlands	2019 Utrecht shooting	A 37 year old Turkish man opened fire in a tram before being arrested.	Gökmen Tanis	Islamic terrorism in Europe
20 March	Kidnap, arson	0	12	Crema, Italy	2019 Italian bus hijack	A school bus driver in Lombardy doused the bus in petrol and ordered three adults on board to tie up 50 children. The police broke the rear window to free those on board before the flames could spread. The perpetrator, a man of Senegalese descent who said he was avenging deaths of African migrants, was convicted of forced confinement with terrorist intent and sentenced to 24 years in prison.	Ousseynou Sy	Terrorism in Italy
23 March	Shooting, machete attack, arson	160	0	Mopti Region, Mali	Ogossagou massacre	Fulani Herders were killed in an attack launched on the villages of Ogossagou and Welingara near the town of Bankass. The attackers were dressed as Dozo hunters and the attack appeared to have been ethnically motivated.	Dozo Dogon Militants	Northern Mali Conflict
24 March	Arson	0	0	Escondido, California, United States	California mosque fire	Dar-ul-Arqam Mosque was set on fire. When the police arrived they found graffiti referencing the Christchurch mosque shootings in New Zealand, that said "For Brenton Tarrant -t /pol/" a reference to the Australian perpetrator behind the two terrorist attacks. The shooter of the Poway synagogue shooting at the Chabad of Poway in Poway, California, one month later in April claimed responsibility in his manifesto that he posted on 8chan.	John T. Earnest	Terrorism in the United States
26 March–4 April	Arson	0	0	Opelousas, Louisiana, United States	Louisiana black church fires	After the burning of a church on March 26, two other churches were burned down in St. Landry Parish. The Greater Union Baptist Church on April 2 and the Mt. Pleasant Baptist Church on April 4. The son of a St. Landry Parish sheriff's deputy was charged with arson.	Holden Matthews	Terrorism in the United States
12 April	Suicide bombing	20 (+1)	48	Quetta, Pakistan	2019 Quetta bombing	Suicide attack at a vegetable market in Hazarganji.	Lashkar-e-Jhangvi, Islamic State	Insurgency in Balochistan
18 April	Shooting	14	0	Makran Coastal Highway, Pakistan	2019 Makran massacre	Baluchi separatists stopped buses and shot at people who they identified to be Pakistani Navy officers on the Highway. The attackers who were wearing Frontier Corps uniforms later fled from the scene.	Baloch nationalists	Insurgency in Balochistan
21 April	Suicide bombings	269	500+	Colombo, Negombo & Batticaloa, Sri Lanka	2019 Sri Lanka Easter bombings	Explosions at three churches, three hotels and two other places in several cities.	Islamic State, National Thowheeth Jama'ath	Terrorism in Sri Lanka
27 April	Shooting	1	3	Poway, United States	Poway synagogue shooting	A man fired at Jews in the Chabad of Poway synagogue. The suspect published an anti-Semitic and racist open letter on 8chan where he blamed Jews for a supposed white genocide and other ills. He was inspired by Australian terrorist Brenton Harrison Tarrant, perpetrator of the Christchurch mosque shootings at Al Noor Mosque and Linwood Islamic Centre in New Zealand, and Robert Bowers, perpetrator of the Pittsburgh synagogue shooting at Tree of Life – Or L'Simcha Congregation.	John T. Earnest	Terrorism in the United States
1 May	Bombing	16	Unknown	Gadchiroli, Gadchiroli district, India	2019 Gadchiroli Naxal Attack	Police personnel and a driver were killed when Naxalites triggered a powerful explosive device near their vehicle.	Naxalite	Naxalite-Maoist insurgency
3–6 May	Rocket attacks	19 (+10)	270–400+	Southern Israel	Gaza–Israel clashes (May 2019)	Clashes between Gaza and Israel escalated when two Israeli soldiers were shot by a Palestinian Islamic Jihad sniper and militants from Gaza fired more than 600 rockets into Israel. This resulted in 4 Israelis dead and reportedly more than 125 injured. In return Israel Defense Forces conducted several operations inside Gaza in which more than 10 militants and 15 civilians were killed and reportedly injured more than 150 people.	Hamas, Palestinian Islamic Jihad, National Resistance Brigades, Tawhid al-Jihad, and Israel Defense Forces	Israeli–Palestinian conflict
8 May	Suicide bombing	13 (+1)	24	Lahore, Pakistan	2019 Lahore bombing	Suicide bombing at the gate for female visitors at the Sufi Data Darbar shrine.	Jamaat-ul-Ahrar	Terrorism in Pakistan
11 May	Shooting	5 (+3)	6	Gwadar, Pakistan	2019 Pearl Continental Hotel attack	Three terrorists wearing security uniform and armed with rifles and grenades attacked a luxury hotel, triggering an hours-long shootout.	Balochistan Liberation Army	Insurgency in Balochistan
24 May	Bombing	3	20	Kabul, Afghanistan	Kabul mosque bombing 2019	Explosion in a mosque during Friday prayers.	Taliban (allegedly)	War in Afghanistan
24 May	Bombing	0	13	Lyon, France	2019 Lyon bomb explosion	A 24-year-old Algerian man riding a bike dropped a bomb in front of a bakery. The suspect told investigators that he had pledged allegiance to the Islamic State.	Islamic State	Islamic terrorism in Europe
26 May	Bombing	4	7	Kathmandu, Nepal	May 2019 Kathmandu bombings	Three separate accidental explosions by a splinter group of former Maoist rebels.	Communist Party (Biplab)	Terrorism in Nepal
2 June	Car bombing	22	45	Azaz, Syria	June 2019 Syria attacks	Car bombing near a market and a mosque.	Islamic State	Syrian Civil War
2 June	Shooting, assassination	1	0	Kassel, Germany	Murder of Walter Lübcke	CDU politician Walter Lübcke was shot dead in front of his residence in Wolfhagen. A suspect from a far-right group was arrested.	Combat 18	Terrorism in Germany
3 June	Bombing, shooting	4 (+1)	0	Tripoli, Lebanon	2019 Tripoli shooting	A militant attacked a security patrol with a bomb and then opened fire killing two policemen and two soldiers. The attacker then detonated his explosives after he was holed up in a building.	Islamic State	Terrorism in Lebanon
10 June	Shooting	35	Unknown	Mopti Region, Mali	Sobane Da massacre	About 50 heavily armed men surrounded and attacked the village of Sobane-Kou, which was inhabited by people belonging to the Dogon ethnic group. The government has suspected a terrorist group but an official blamed a Fulani militia. 95 bodies were claimed to have been found, but 19 people were still missing. The toll was based on claims of soldiers and the district mayor. Mali government revised it to 35 after a personal count by an expert team, the confusion being due to those who fled.	Fulani militia or jihadists (suspected)	Northern Mali conflict
12 June	Rocket attack	0	26	Abha, Saudi Arabia	Abha International Airport attack	A Houthi-fired rocket landed in the arrivals hall of the Abha International Airport.	Houthi movement	Yemeni Civil War
16 June	Suicide bombings	30 (+3)	40+	Konduga, Nigeria	2019 Borno bombings	Three Boko Haram suicide bombers detonated in the Mandareri-Sambisa ward of the Konduga Local Government Area in central Borno State. The bombers targeted a crowd of civilians watching a football match.	Boko Haram	Boko Haram insurgency
17 June	Shooting	0 (+1)	1	Dallas, United States of America	2019 Dallas courthouse shooting	A gunman attacked the Earle Cabell Federal Building and Courthouse. The shooter was shot dead by security forces. The gunman appears to have self-radicalized online, posting memes from an incel, extremist far right memes including ideas about the Confederate States and Nazism, combining eco-friendly and libertarian ideas with far-right authoritarianism.	Bryan Isaack Clyde	Terrorism in the United States
28 June	Suicide bombings	6 (+2)	22	Indanan, Philippines	2019 Indanan bombings	Two suicide bombers attacked a military camp.	Islamic State (claimed); Abu Sayyaf (suspected)	Moro conflict
1 July	Car bombing, shooting	40 (+5)	100+	Kabul, Afghanistan	1 July 2019 Kabul attack	Assault on a defense ministry building. Five attackers were also killed.	Taliban	War in Afghanistan
12 July	Suicide car bombing, shooting	26 (+4)	56	Kismayo, Somalia	Asasey hotel attack	Four gunmen stormed the Asasey hotel after a suicide car bombing and laid siege in the building.	Al-Shabaab	Somali Civil War (2009–present)
27 July	Shooting	65	10	Nganzai, Nigeria	Nganzai funeral attack	Attack on a funeral in Borno State.	Boko Haram	Boko Haram insurgency
31 July	Bombing	35	27	Farah, Afghanistan	2019 Farah bombing	Roadside bomb.	Taliban	War in Afghanistan
3 August	Mass shooting	23	23	El Paso, Texas, United States	2019 El Paso shooting	Mass shooting at a Walmart store. The attacker released a manifesto before the attack containing racist and ecofascist themes.	Patrick Crusius	Terrorism in the United States
4 August	Bombing	20 (+1)	49	Cairo, Egypt	2019 Cairo bombing	An explosion following a crash caused by a car that drove into three other cars outside a hospital.	Hasm Movement (suspected)	Sinai insurgency
7 August	Stabbing	1	0	Migdal Oz, West Bank	Murder of Dvir Sorek	An 18 year old Yeshiva student was stabbed to death by a Palestinian terrorist near a bus stop.	Hamas	Israeli–Palestinian conflict
10 August	Shooting	1	1 (+1)	Bærum, Norway	Bærum mosque shooting	A gunman opened fire on the Al-Noor Islamic Centre, just outside Oslo. A woman was later found dead at the house of the attacker. The attacker was sentenced to 21 years in prison for murder and terrorist crimes.	Philip Manshaus	Right-wing terrorism in Europe
17 August	Suicide bombing	92 (+1)	142	Kabul, Afghanistan	17 August 2019 Kabul bombing	A bomb exploded in a wedding hall, in an area in the west of the city mostly populated by Shia Muslims.	Islamic State	War in Afghanistan
23 August	Bombing	1	2	Dolev, West Bank	Murder of Rina Shnerb	A roadside bomb exploded when the Shnerb family where hiking. Rina was killed, while her brother and father were injured.	PFLP	Israeli–Palestinian conflict
8 September	Bombing, shooting	29	6	Sanmatenga Province, Burkina Faso	Sanmatenga attacks	In the first attack, one vehicle transporting people and goods rode over an improvised explosive device in the Barsalogho Department leaving at least 15 passengers dead. In the second attack, 14 people were killed after a convoy of mostly three-wheeled vehicles taking food to people displaced by fighting was attacked.	Unknown	Insurgency in the Maghreb
15 September	Bombing	12	13	Al-Rai, Syria	2019 al-Rai bombing	Car bombing explosion next to a hospital.	Unknown	Syrian Civil War
3 October	Stabbing	4 (+1)	2	Paris, France	Paris police headquarters stabbing	An administrative worker who had been recently converted to Salafist Islam went on a stabbing spree at the central police headquarters before being shot dead by officers.	Mickaël Harpon	Islamic terrorism in Europe
4 October	Shooting	20	Unknown	Arbinda Department, Burkina Faso	Dolmane gold mine attack	An attack on a gold mine.	Al-Qaeda in the Islamic Maghreb (suspected)	Insurgency in the Maghreb
9 October	Shooting, bombing	2	2 (+1)	Halle and Landsberg, Germany	Halle synagogue shooting	A man wearing military style clothing attempted to enter a synagogue by force and attacked a kebab shop in Halle. The attacker fled the scene in a car and wounded a man and a woman while stealing a Taxicap from a garage in the Landsberg region. A few hours later he had an accident near Zeitz and was arrested. The attacker had a far-right terror motive, and streamed the attack on Twitch for 35 minutes, where he explained his motives for the attack and expressed racist comments on Jews and non-white people.	Stephan Balliet	Terrorism in Germany
10 October	Stabbing	0	4	Banten Province, Indonesia	Stabbing attack against Wiranto	Wiranto, a 72-year-old politician, was stabbed two times in his stomach by an Islamic State member but survived. Three other people, including a police officer, were stabbed and wounded. The two attackers, a man and a woman, were arrested.	Islamic State/Jamaah Ansharut Daulah	Terrorism in Indonesia
11 October	Shooting	16	2	Oudalan Province, Burkina Faso	Burkina Faso mosque attack	Gunmen attacked the Grand Mosque in Salmossi while residents were praying inside.	Jama'at Nasr al-Islam wal Muslimin (suspected)	Insurgency in the Maghreb
18 October	Bombings	73	36	Nangarhar Province, Afghanistan	Haska Meyna mosque bombing	Twin blasts in a mosque during Friday prayer.	Islamic State (suspected)	War in Afghanistan
29 October	Massacre	7	1	Kulgam district, India	2019 Kulgam massacre	Bengali Muslim laborers were attacked in their home.	Hizbul Mujahideen	Insurgency in Jammu and Kashmir
1 November	Shooting	54	3	Ménaka Region, Mali	2019 Indelimane attack	Attack on a military post in In-Delimane, in the Ménaka Region near the border with Niger. The attackers reportedly fled towards the border afterwards.	Islamic State	Northern Mali conflict
13 November	Suicide bombing	0 (+1)	6	Medan, Indonesia	2019 Medan suicide bombing	A suicide bomber blew himself up near the Medan Police headquarters.	Jamaah Ansharut Daulah	Terrorism in Indonesia
29 November	Stabbing	2 (+1)	3	London, United Kingdom	2019 London Bridge stabbing	Mass stabbing at London Bridge. The attacker, 28-year-old Usman Khan, wearing a fake explosive belt, was shot dead by police.	Usman Khan	Islamic terrorism in Europe
6 December	Shooting	3 (+1)	8	Pensacola, United States	Naval Air Station Pensacola shooting	A Saudi student opened fire at a US naval base. He was identified as Mohamed Saeed Alshamrani.	AQAP	Terrorism in the United States
6 December	Ambush, shooting	11	4	Wajir County, Kenya	2019 Kenya bus shooting	Gunmen ambushed a bus belonging to The Medina Bus Company near the border with Somalia. The attackers specifically targeted non-Somalis.	Al-Shabaab	Terrorism in Kenya
10 December	Shooting	4 (+2)	3	Jersey City, United States	2019 Jersey City shooting	A man and a woman opened fire at a kosher grocery store. Three civilians were killed and another civilian and two police officers were wounded. Before the attack the shooters killed a police detective at a nearby cemetery. During a shootout with the police the two attackers were killed. They acted due to anti-Semitic and anti-police motives.	Black Hebrew Israelite movement	Terrorism in the United States
11 December	Suicide car bombing, car bombing, shooting	2 (+1)	80	Bagram Airfield, Afghanistan	2019 Bagram Airfield attack	Multiple militants of the Taliban attacked the biggest American base in Afghanistan and an under construction medical facility near the base.	Taliban	War in Afghanistan
11 December	Shooting, bombing, mortar attack	71 (+?)	12	Inates, Niger	Battle of Inates	Militants armed with mortars and bombs, attacked a military post. 30 soldiers were reported missing.	ISWAP	Insurgency in the Maghreb
24 December	Mass shooting	42 (+80)	Several	Arbinda, Burkina Faso	Arbinda attack	Jihadists attacked an army outpost, resulting in the deaths of 7 soldiers and 80 militants. Simultaneously, dozens of militants attacked civilians in the nearby town of Arbinda, killing 35, including 31 women. Islamic State claimed responsibility, but only for the killing of the soldiers.	ISWAP	Insurgency in the Maghreb
28 December	Suicide truck bombing	84 (+1)	150+	Mogadishu, Somalia	December 2019 Mogadishu bombing	A suicide truck bombing at a checkpoint.	Al-Shabaab	Somali Civil War
