= Murder of Rina Shnerb =

2019 roadside bombing in Israel

- Part of the Israeli–Palestinian conflict
- Location: Ein Bubin (near Dolev), West Bank
- Date: 23 August 2019
- Weapon: Roadside IED
- Deaths: 1 (Rina Shnerb)
- Injuries: 2 (Eitan Shnerb, Dvir Shnerb)
- Victim: Shnerb family
- Perpetrator: PFLP

On 23 August 2019, 17-year-old Israeli Rina Shnerb (Hebrew: רנה שנרב) was killed by a roadside bomb while hiking with her father, Rabbi Eitan Shnerb, and brother Dvir near Dolev, an Israeli settlement in the West Bank; her father and brother were wounded. Shnerb's funeral was held in Lod on 23 August.

== Background ==
The explosion/attack took place near the spring of Ein Bubin, close to the Palestinian village of Deir Ibzi, whose lower lands, near the spring area, are abandoned because they are denied access and only allowed to be used by the Palestinians for two or three days a year. Springs, in particular, are flash-points in the conflict between Israelis settlers and the local Palestinian villagers in the Israeli-occupied West Bank, with, according to Dror Ektes, over 60 springs seized in the past 10 years from Palestinians so far, and thereupon reserved for Jewish use only. Palestinian villagers had so far, by then, had resisted efforts to take over the Ein Bubin spring and were still able to access it due to their efforts.

According to Amira Hass, the site is one of nine in an area where, over three decades, the settlements of Dolev and Nahliel, and illegal Israeli outposts between them, have seized control over some 3,700 acres of Palestinian land.

== Attack and explosion ==
On 23 August 2019, a roadside bomb from an improvised explosive device went off while Rina Shnerb was hiking with her father, Eitan Shnerb, and brother Dvir near Dolev, an Israeli settlement in the West Bank. Rina Shnerb, at only 17-years-old, was killed by the roadside bomb, while her father and brother were wounded.

== Aftermath ==
=== Arrest of suspects and trial ===
In the aftermath, Israeli forces arrested three PFLP members allegedly responsible, one of whom was hospitalized with his life in danger after interrogation using "exceptional means" by Shin Bet.

=== Funeral ===
Shnerb's funeral was held in Lod on 23 August.

=== Demolition of the suspects' homes ===
On 5 March 2020, the Israeli Defense Force (IDF) destroyed the homes of two suspected perpetrators in the Ramallah area.

== Reactions ==
=== Israel ===
- Bezalel Smotrich of Yamina called for the annexation of the West Bank in response to Shnerb's killing.
- The father, an IDF reserve military chaplain, said that his message to the suspects is "we are here and we are strong and we will prevail".

=== Palestine ===
- Hamas praised the attack.
- Palestinian Islamic Jihad called it a "natural response" to Israeli water-blocking of and land seizures from Palestinians.
- The Palestinian Authority said it was likely the work of a "highly organized cell" that posed a threat to the Palestinians as well as Israelis.

=== International ===
- As a reaction to the attack, Dutch Minister for Foreign Trade and Development Cooperation Sigrid Kaag temporarily halted aid payments given to the Union of Agricultural Work Committees, an organization which was suspected to have been allegedly paying salaries to the perpetrators.

== Legacy ==
On 21 April 2020, eight months after the murder, had a new child, a girl. Her parents considered naming the baby Rina but decided that "Rina is still with us in spirit", and gave the newly-born a different name.

In April 2022, a new spring in the Jordan Valley was dedicated to Shnerb.

== See also ==
- List of terrorist incidents in August 2019
- Murder of Ori Ansbacher
- Murder of Dvir Sorek

== Sources ==
- "Israeli teenage girl killed in West Bank bomb attack". BBC News. 23 August 2019.
- Halbfinger, David M. (23 August 2019). "Bomb Kills Israeli Girl, 17, at a West Bank Oasis". New York Times.
- Harel, Amos (29 September 2019). "Analysis // This Palestinian Terror Suspect Is No Saint. But Something Went Wrong in Israel's Interrogation of Him". Haaretz.
- Hass, Amira (26 August 2019). "The Tragic Hike That Has Nothing to Do With the Landscape and Land". Haaretz.
- Khoury, Jack (2 October 2019). "Condition of Palestinian terror suspect 'tortured' in Shin Bet". Haaretz.
- Levy, Gideon; Levac, Alex (30 August 2019). "'This Place Is Only for Jews': The West Bank's Apartheid Springs". Haaretz.
- Sokol, Sam (6 September 2019). "Two Weeks After Surviving Terror Attack, Israeli Teen Becomes A Medic". The Forward.
