= Beit Kahil =

Beit Kahil بيت كاحل
- Municipality type C

Arabic transcription(s)
  - Arabic: بيت كاحل
  - Latin: Bayt Kahil (official); Beit Kaheel (unofficial)
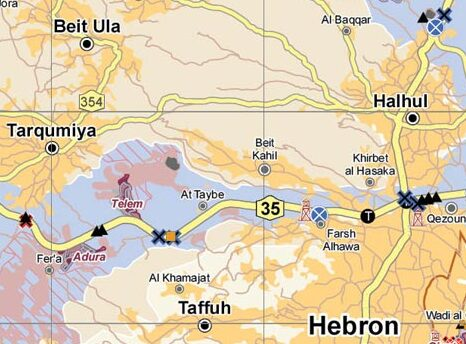
- Beit Kahil in the 2018 OCHA OpT map of the Hebron Governorate

- Location of Beit Kahil within Palestine
- Coordinates: 31°34′11″N 35°03′58″E
- Palestine grid: 156/108
- State: State of Palestine
- Governorate: Hebron

Government
  - Type: Municipality

Area
  - Total: 5.8 km^{2} (2.2 sq mi)

Population (2017)
  - Total: 8,880
  - Density: 1,500/km^{2} (4,000/sq mi)
- Name meaning: "House of the occulist"

Beit Kahil (Arabic: بيت كاحل) is a Palestinian village in the Hebron Governorate in the southern West Bank, located seven kilometers northwest of Hebron. The village had a population of 8,880 in 2017.

== History ==
Victor Guérin noted that the place was apparently ancient, and suggested that Beit Kahil was to be identified with the Roman-period city known in Latin as Cela (Greek: Κηλά), described by Eusebius in his Onomasticon, rather than with the Biblical Keilah (Greek: Κεειλά), which was already a ruin in Guérin's time.

Oral tradition suggests that Beit Kahil was founded after the 16th century.

=== Ottoman era ===
In the 16th century, Beit Kahil functioned as a mazra'a (farm). It became inhabited with people from Bayt Jibrin, likely as a result of local conflicts. Bedouin settlers, possibly from Jamrura, also took residence there. The establishment of a permanent village dates back to around the mid-19th century.

Ben-Zvi wrote that the local inhabitants were originally Christians and converted to Islam around 150 years prior to his writing in the 1920s.

In the Ottoman census no. 289, (961 AH/1553-1554 CE) p. 209; Bayt Khalil was located in the nahiya of Halil, and noted as Mazra’a (cultivated) land.

In 1863 Victor Guérin found that it had thirty houses, while an Ottoman village list from about 1870 counted 8 houses and a population of 22, though the population count included men only.

In 1883 the PEF's Survey of Western Palestine (SWP) described Beit Kahel as “a small village on a ridge, built of stone, with a well to the south. Apparently an ancient place, with rock-cut tombs.”

=== British Mandate era ===
In the 1922 census of Palestine, conducted by the British Mandate authorities, Beit Kahil had a population of 336 inhabitants, all Muslims, increasing in the 1931 census to 452, still entirely Muslim, in 90 inhabited houses. In the latter census it was counted with Kh. Beit Kanun, Kh. Hawala and Kh. Tawas.

In the 1945 statistics the population of Beit Kahil was 570 Muslims, and the total land area was 5,795 dunams of land according to an official land and population survey. Of this, 1,359 dunams were plantations and irrigable land, 1,785 were for cereals, while 26 dunams were built-up (urban) land.

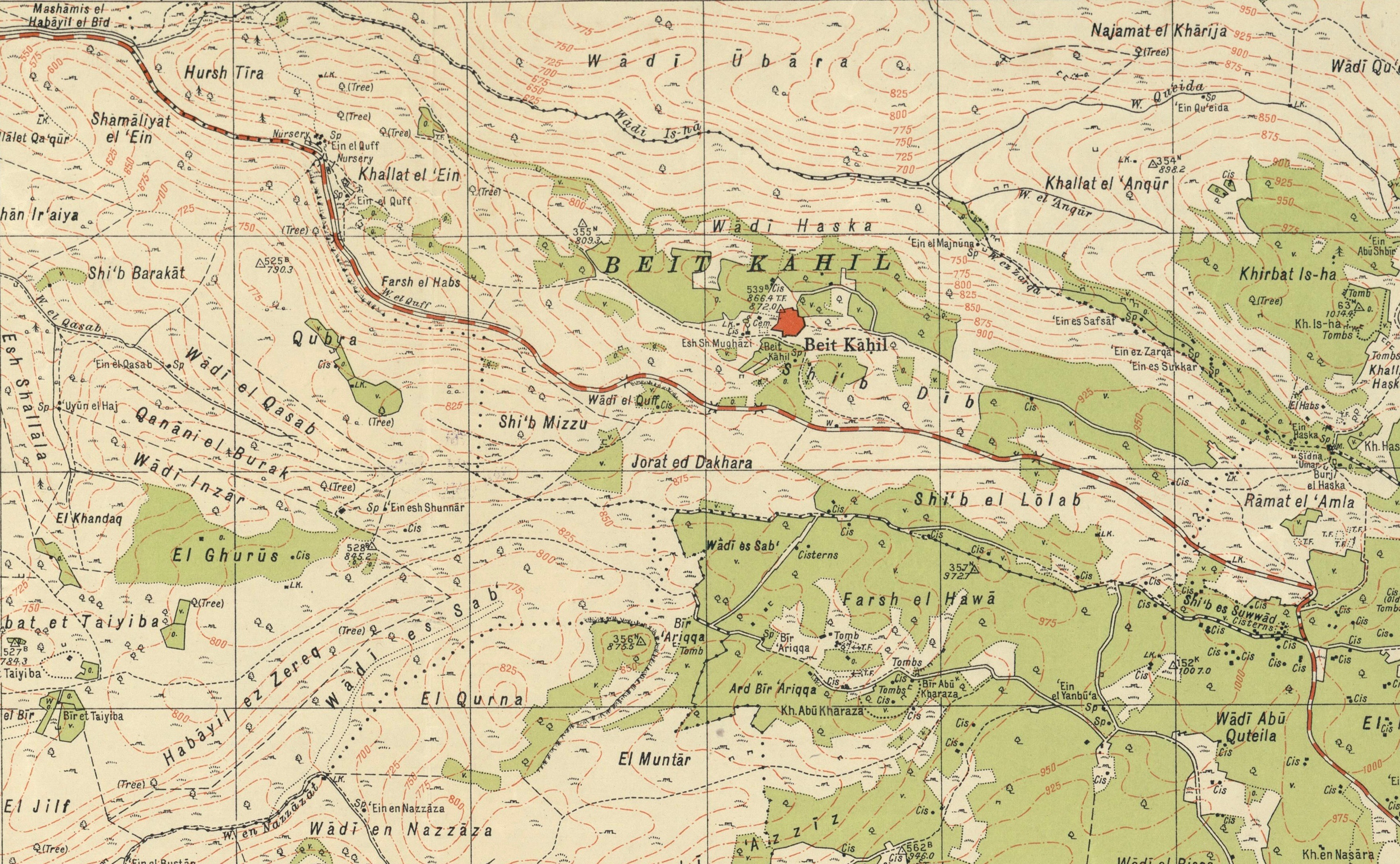
Beit Kahil, British Mandate map, 1:20,000

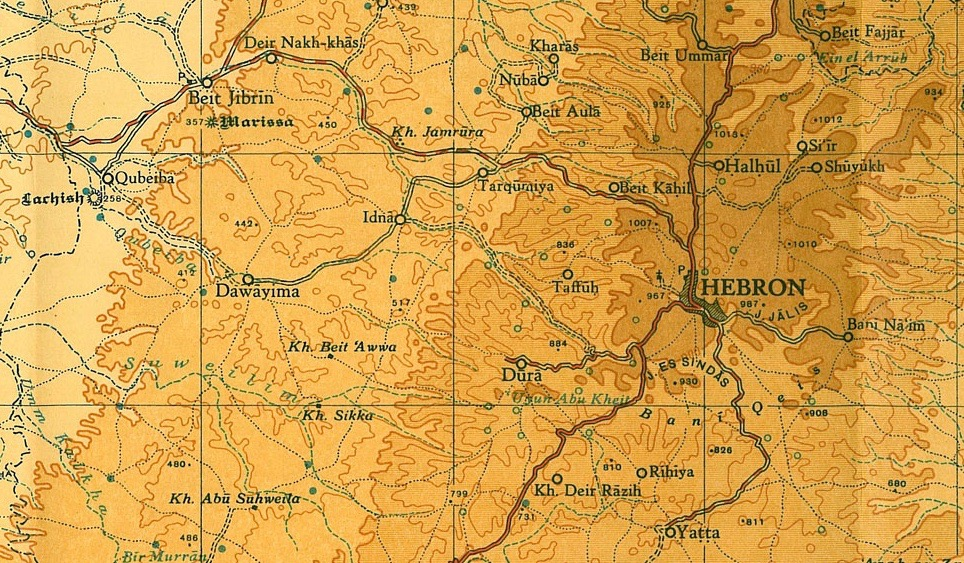
Beit Kahil 1945 1:250,000

=== 1948-1967 ===
In the wake of the 1948 Arab–Israeli War, and after the 1949 Armistice Agreements, Beit Kahil came under Jordanian rule.

The Jordanian census of 1961 found 704 inhabitants in Beit Kahil.

=== Post-1967 ===
Since the Six-Day War in 1967, Beit Kahil has been under Israeli occupation. Since 1995, it has been governed by the Palestinian National Authority (PNA) as part of Area B of the West Bank.

According to the Palestinian Central Bureau of Statistics, Beit Kahil had a population of approximately 6,526 inhabitants in 2007. The population is made up of several clans, including al-Attawna, al-Assafra, al-Zuhoor, al-Judi, Barham and al-Khateeb. The village's total land area is 5,795 dunams.

==== Detention of residents ====
In August, 2019, Israeli authorities detained two individuals from Beit Kahil who were accused in the murder of Dvir Sorek; a 19-year-old Israeli settler. In October the detainees were indicted, and in November the IDF demolished the homes of the families of the two detainees, alongside those of two others charged in connection with the murder, in Beit Kahil. The criminal case was resolved two and a half years later, in May 2022, when all four men, together with a fifth, were convicted by military court.

In September, 2019, the deputy mayor and his son in addition to two other people from Beit Kahil were detained in mass arrest over the West Bank.

== Bibliography ==
- Barron, J.B., ed. (1923). Palestine: Report and General Abstracts of the Census of 1922. Government of Palestine.
- Conder, C.R.; Kitchener, H.H. (1883). The Survey of Western Palestine: Memoirs of the Topography, Orography, Hydrography, and Archaeology. Vol. 3. London: Committee of the Palestine Exploration Fund.
- Government of Jordan, Department of Statistics (1964). First Census of Population and Housing. Volume I: Final Tables; General Characteristics of the Population (PDF).
- Government of Palestine, Department of Statistics (1945). Village Statistics, April, 1945. Government of Palestine.
- Guérin, V. (1869). Description Géographique Historique et Archéologique de la Palestine (in French). Vol. 1: Judee, pt. 3. Paris: L'Imprimerie Nationale.
- Hadawi, S. (1970). Village Statistics of 1945: A Classification of Land and Area ownership in Palestine. Palestine Liberation Organization Research Centre.
- Hartmann, M. (1883). "Die Ortschaftenliste des Liwa Jerusalem in dem türkischen Staatskalender für Syrien auf das Jahr 1288 der Flucht (1871)". Zeitschrift des Deutschen Palästina-Vereins. 6: 102–149.
- Mills, E., ed. (1932). Census of Palestine 1931. Population of Villages, Towns and Administrative Areas. Jerusalem: Government of Palestine.
- Palmer, E.H. (1881). The Survey of Western Palestine: Arabic and English Name Lists Collected During the Survey by Lieutenants Conder and Kitchener, R. E. Transliterated and Explained by E.H. Palmer. Committee of the Palestine Exploration Fund.
- Socin, A. (1879). "Alphabetisches Verzeichniss von Ortschaften des Paschalik Jerusalem". Zeitschrift des Deutschen Palästina-Vereins. 2: 135–163.
- Toledano, E. (1984). "The Sanjaq of Jerusalem in the Sixteenth Century: Aspects of Topography and Population". Archivum Ottomanicum. 9: 279–319. Archived from the original on 2016-03-05.
