= Kafr Ni'ma =

- Municipality type C

Arabic transcription(s)
  - Arabic: كفر نعمة
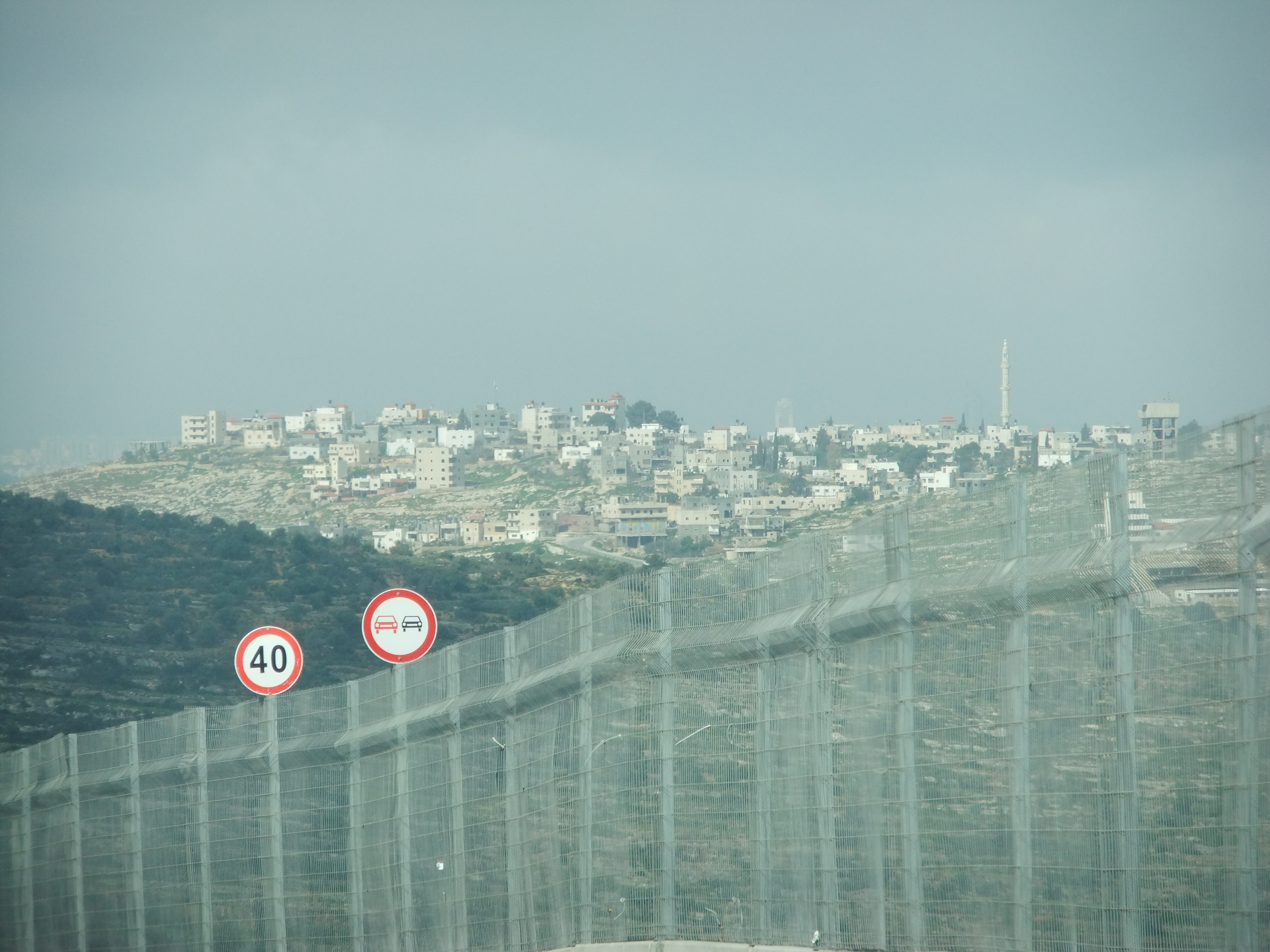
- Kafr Ni'ma

- Location of Kafr Ni'ma within Palestine
- Coordinates: 31°55′39″N 35°05′43″E
- Palestine grid: 159/148
- State: State of Palestine
- Governorate: Ramallah and al-Bireh

Government
  - Type: Municipality
- Elevation: 494 m (1,621 ft)

Population (2017)
  - Total: 4,659
- Name meaning: The village of Namah, (personal name)

Kafr Ni'ma (Arabic: كفر نعمة) is a Palestinian town in the Ramallah and al-Bireh Governorate, located 13 kilometers northwest of Ramallah in the northern West Bank. According to the Palestinian Central Bureau of Statistics (PCBS), the town had a population of 4,659 inhabitants in 2017.

== Location ==
Kafr Ni'ma is located in the Ramallah Governorate, 10.3 kilometers (6.4 mi) west of Ramallah. Kafr Ni'ma is bordered by Deir Ibzi and Al Janiya to the east, Ras Karkar and Kharbatha Ban'i Harith to the north, Saffa and Bil'in to the west, and Deir Ibzi and Saffa to the south.

== History ==
Sherds from the Iron Age II, Hellenistic, Roman, Byzantine and Mamluk eras have been found here.

=== Ottoman era ===
Kafr Ni'ma was incorporated into the Ottoman Empire in 1517 with all of Palestine, and in 1596 it appeared in the tax registers as being in the nahiya (subdistrict) of al-Quds (Jerusalem) in the liwa (district) of al-Quds. It had a population of 9 households, all Muslims. They paid a fixed tax-rate of 33.3% on agricultural products, including wheat, barley, olive trees, vineyards, fruit trees, goats and beehives, in addition to occasional revenues; a total of 4,100 akçe. 13/24 of the revenue went to a waqf (religious endowment), the rest was ziamet land.

In 1838, Kefr Na'meh was noted as a Muslim village in the District of Beni Harith, north of Jerusalem. An Ottoman village list of about 1870 counted a population of 353 in 88 houses, though the population count included men only.

In 1882, the PEF's Survey of Western Palestine described Kefr Nameh as: "a village of smaller size with a well to the south, on the side of hill, with olives." In 1896 the population of Kefr Na'me was estimated to be about 657 persons.

=== British Mandate era ===
In the 1922 census of Palestine conducted by the British Mandate authorities, the village, called Kufr Ne'meh, had a population of 517, all Muslims, increasing in the 1931 census to 681 inhabitants, in 170 houses.

In the 1945 statistics the population was 780 Muslims, while the total land area was 10,286 dunams, according to an official land and population survey. Of this, 5,363 were allocated for plantations and irrigable land, 2,148 for cereals, while 31 dunams were classified as built-up areas.

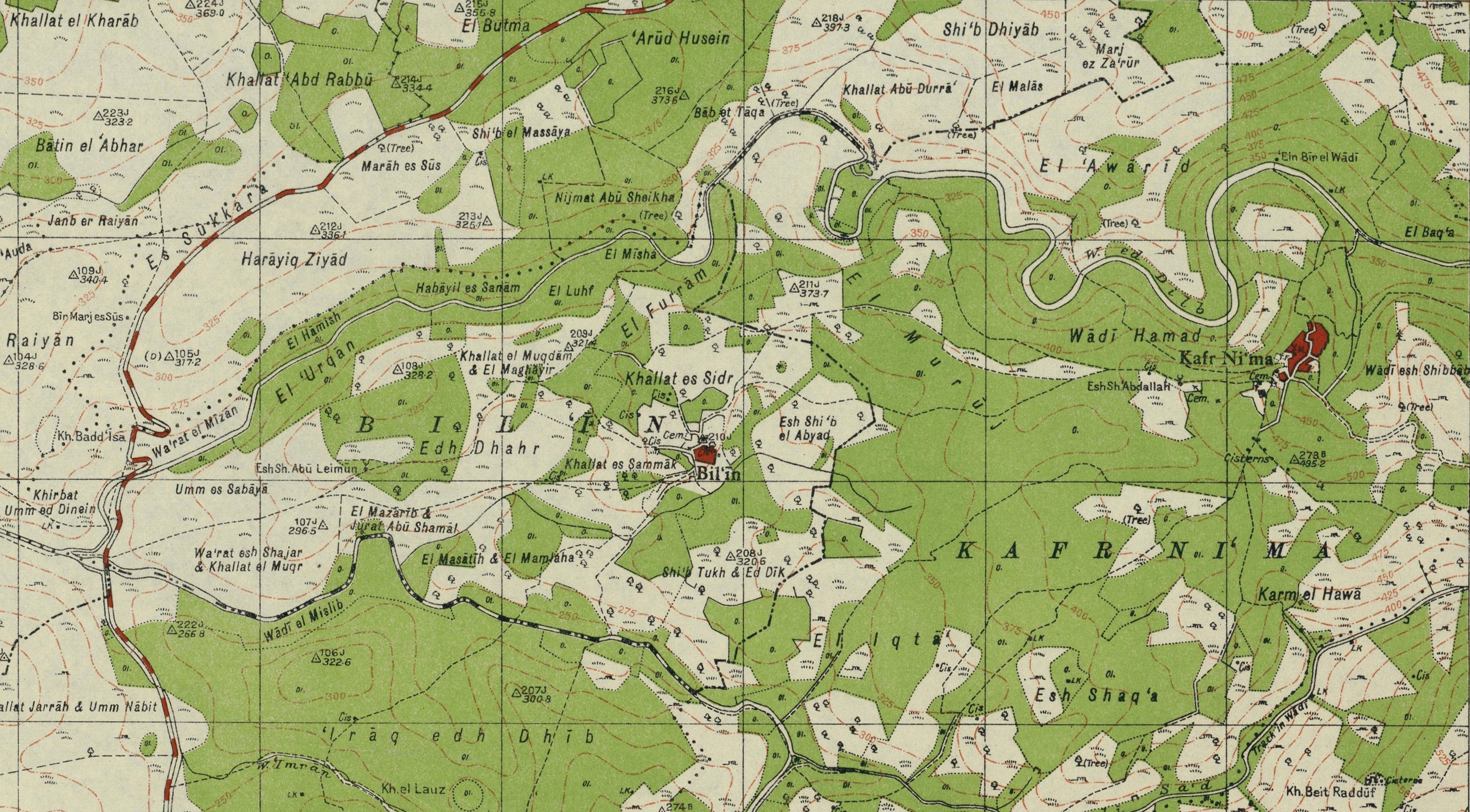
Kafr Ni'ma 1944 1:20,000 from 1919 survey

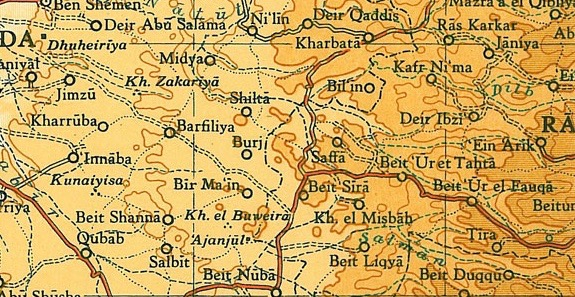
Kafr Ni'ma 1945 1:250,000 (top right quadrant)

=== Jordanian era ===
In the wake of the 1948 Arab–Israeli War, and after the 1949 Armistice Agreements, Kafr Ni'ma came under Jordanian rule.

The Jordanian census of 1961 found 1,065 inhabitants in Kafr Ni'ma.

=== 1967-present ===
Since the Six-Day War in 1967, Kafr Ni'ma has been under Israeli occupation.

After the 1995 accords, 70.2% of Kafr Nima land is defined as Area B land, while the remaining 29.8% is defined as Area C.

The old core of the village is mostly abandoned, while the modern settlement has expanded southward onto the ridge.

==== Israel–Gaza war ====
On 10 June 2024, four Palestinians were shot dead by Israeli military forces during a raid in the town.

== Bibliography ==
- Barron, J.B., ed. (1923). Palestine: Report and General Abstracts of the Census of 1922. Government of Palestine.
- Conder, C.R.; Kitchener, H.H. (1882). The Survey of Western Palestine: Memoirs of the Topography, Orography, Hydrography, and Archaeology. Vol. 2. London: Committee of the Palestine Exploration Fund.
- Finkelstein, I.; Lederman, Zvi, eds. (1997). Highlands of many cultures. Tel Aviv: Institute of Archaeology of Tel Aviv University Publications Section. ISBN 965-440-007-3.
- Government of Jordan, Department of Statistics (1964). First Census of Population and Housing. Volume I: Final Tables; General Characteristics of the Population (PDF).
- Government of Palestine, Department of Statistics (1945). Village Statistics, April, 1945.
- Hadawi, S. (1970). Village Statistics of 1945: A Classification of Land and Area ownership in Palestine. Palestine Liberation Organization Research Center.
- Hartmann, M. (1883). "Die Ortschaftenliste des Liwa Jerusalem in dem türkischen Staatskalender für Syrien auf das Jahr 1288 der Flucht (1871)". Zeitschrift des Deutschen Palästina-Vereins. 6: 102–149.
- Hütteroth, W.-D.; Abdulfattah, K. (1977). Historical Geography of Palestine, Transjordan and Southern Syria in the Late 16th Century. Erlanger Geographische Arbeiten, Sonderband 5. Erlangen, Germany: Vorstand der Fränkischen Geographischen Gesellschaft. ISBN 3-920405-41-2.
- Mills, E., ed. (1932). Census of Palestine 1931. Population of Villages, Towns and Administrative Areas. Jerusalem: Government of Palestine.
- Palmer, E.H. (1881). The Survey of Western Palestine: Arabic and English Name Lists Collected During the Survey by Lieutenants Conder and Kitchener, R. E. Transliterated and Explained by E.H. Palmer. Committee of the Palestine Exploration Fund.
- Robinson, E.; Smith, E. (1841). Biblical Researches in Palestine, Mount Sinai and Arabia Petraea: A Journal of Travels in the year 1838. Vol. 3. Boston: Crocker & Brewster.
- Schick, C. (1896). "Zur Einwohnerzahl des Bezirks Jerusalem". Zeitschrift des Deutschen Palästina-Vereins. 19: 120–127.
- Socin, A. (1879). "Alphabetisches Verzeichniss von Ortschaften des Paschalik Jerusalem". Zeitschrift des Deutschen Palästina-Vereins. 2: 135–163.
