= Murder of Ori Ansbacher =

2019 rape and murder in Israel

- Part of Palestinian terrorism and the Israeli-Palestinian conflict
- The attack site
- Native name: רצח אוֹרי אַנְסְבַּכֶר
- Location: 31°44′34″N 35°10′38″E; Ein Yael, Jerusalem, Israel
- Date: 7 February 2019 (body discovered)
- Target: Israeli Jews
- Attack type: Stabbing
- Weapon: Knife
- Deaths: 1
- Motive: Anti-Semitism

The murder of Ori Ansbacher (Hebrew: רצח אוֹרי אַנְסְבַּכֶר, also known as the Ein Yael attack) was a terror attack on 7 February 2019 during which a Palestinian man raped and then murdered Ori Ansbacher, a 19-year-old Israeli woman from Tekoa.

== Background and attack ==
On February 7, 2019, 11:00 AM, Ori's relatives reported her absence to the police. Ori volunteered at a youth center in Jerusalem and, according to friends, on the same day she had left the center agitated and went to seclude herself in nature, as she often liked to do. On 19:14 PM that day, her lifeless body was found by the police in the Ein Yael forest in the outskirts of Jerusalem, with signs of harsh violence. On February 8, 2019, a suspect for the murder named Arafat Irafaiya was arrested by the Israeli security forces in Ramallah. Irafaiya had a terrorist background and had spent time in an Israeli prison before the attack. He and his family are affiliated with Hamas. Irafaiya admitted to raping and murdering Ori, saying that the attack wasn't planned aside from his purchasing of a kippa so that he could enter Israel undetected, adding "I entered Israel with a knife because I wanted to become a martyr and murder a Jew, I met the girl by chance”.

== Trial ==
Irfaiya, who was deemed fit to stand trial, pleaded guilty at the Jerusalem District Court to charges of first-degree murder with a terror motivation, rape and illegal entry into Israel.

== Reactions ==
The murder and its gruesome details caused fury among the Israeli public. Rumors circulated that Ori was decapitated by the murderer.

The murder drove the Israeli government to act on the issue of imprisoned Palestinian terrorists receiving monthly stipends from the Palestinian Authority. On February 17, 2019, the Israeli security cabinet decided to enforce earlier legislation intended to deduct from money delivered by Israel to the Palestinian Authority the amount the Palestinian Authority pays to imprisoned terrorists, sparking outrage among Palestinian officials. Two of Irafaiya's family homes were later demolished by security forces.

Militant Palestinian groups, including Hamas and Islamic Jihad, refrained from taking credit for the murder as it was revealed that Ansbacher had been raped. Irfaiya received no legal representation from Palestinian Prisoners Club or other supporting groups. A senior Fatah official imprisoned in Israel condemned the murder, expressing condolences to Ansbacher's family and asserting that there was nothing nationalist about Irfaiya's actions. He deemed the incident "an embarrassment to the Palestinian people" and stated that any attempt to place Irfaiya among Fatah prisoners would be resisted. Fatah had requested the Palestinian Authority not to provide Irfaiya with a monthly stipend or fund his defense.

The Jewish community in Gush Etzion planted dozens of trees in Ori's memory, which were later destroyed by Palestinian vandals.

== See also ==
- Murder of Dvir Sorek (7 August 2019)
- Murder of Rina Shnerb (23 August 2019)
