= Ein Arik =

Ein 'Arik
- Municipality type D (Village council)

Arabic transcription(s)
  - Arabic: عين عريك
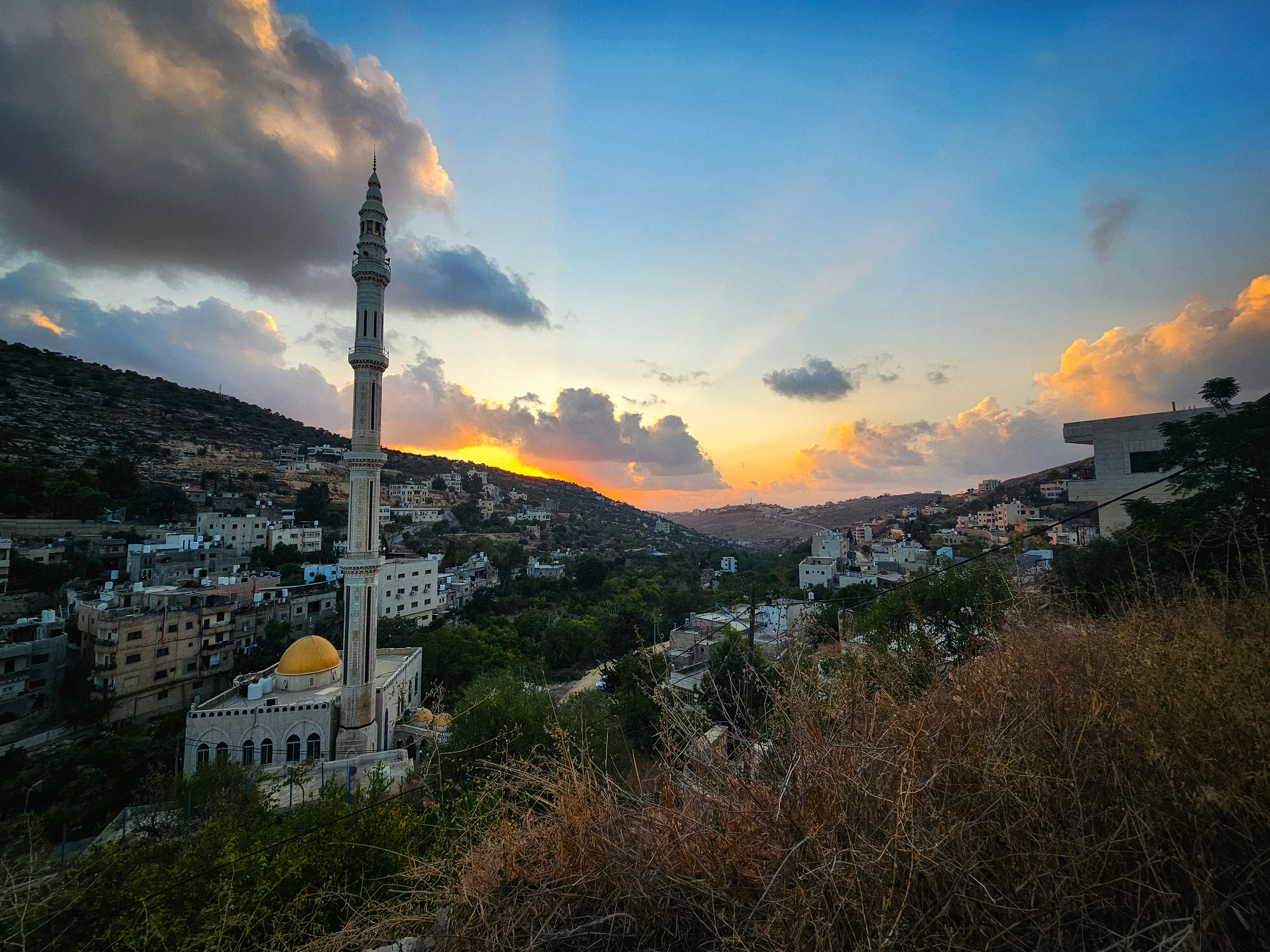
- Ein 'Arik in 2024

- Location of Ein 'Arik within Palestine
- Coordinates: 31°54′24″N 35°08′35″E
- Palestine grid: 163/145
- State: State of Palestine
- Governorate: Ramallah and al-Bireh

Government
  - Type: Village council

Population (2017)
  - Total: 1,774
- Name meaning: "Spring of the compactly-built one"

Ein Arik (Arabic: عين عريك, romanized: ʿAyn ʿArīk) is a Palestinian village in the Ramallah and al-Bireh Governorate, located 7 kilometers west of Ramallah in the central West Bank. According to the Palestinian Central Bureau of Statistics (PCBS), the town had a population of 1,567 inhabitants consisting of Muslims (65%) and Christians (35%) in 2007 and a population of 1,774 in 2017.

Ein Arik was an estate of the Jacobite Church by the mid-11th century and for much of the Crusader period (1099–1187), save for an interruption of several years when it in the possession of a Crusader lord. During the Mamluk period, Ein Arik likely had a majority-Christian population but its recognized headmen were Muslims and the villagers were mainly orchard and vineyard farmers, their output owned by a waqf (endowment) for the benefit of the Haram al-Sharif (Temple Mount) of Jerusalem. In the 16th century, at the start of Ottoman rule, the village had a mixed population of Muslims and Christians (Greek Orthodox and Catholics), which remained the case during travelers' surveys and Ottoman records throughout the 19th century, as well as during British Mandatory rule (1920–1948).

== Location ==
Ein Arik is located 5.6 kilometers (3.5 mi) north-east of Ramallah. It is bordered by Ein Qiniya to the east, Beituniya to the east and south, and Deir Ibzi to the west and north.

== Archaeology ==
Archaeological surveys have never been conducted at the village. Potsherds from the Crusader/Abbasid and early Ottoman period have also been found. Southwest of Ein Arik is Khirbet al-Hafi, where Byzantine Empire pottery has been found, together with glass fragments and ancient agricultural terraces.

== History ==
Some scholar identify Ein Arik as the place of the Archites, mentioned in the Bible as being located between Bethel and Bethoron.

=== Crusader period ===
In the Crusader period, Ein Arik was known as 'Bayt Arif', and already by the mid-11th century the village, together with another just north of Jerusalem, belonged to the Jacobite Church. By 1099 the estate was deserted and was then annexed by a Crusader, Geoffrey of the Tower of David. In 1106, he was imprisoned in Egypt, and his nephew took over the estates. However, the Jacobite Church appealed to Queen Melisende to retrieve possession of the village, which granted in 1138.

Abel associated Ein Arik with 'Beth 'Ariq', a place referenced in a 12th-century Syrian text. According to Conder and Kitchener, Ein Arik was mentioned in Marino Sanuto's Map of the Holy Land as Arecha.

=== Mamluk period ===
Ein Arik was mentioned in a corpus of waqf (religious endowment)-related documents from the Mamluk period (1260–1516) stored in Jerusalem; the waqf concerned agricultural revenues for the benefit of the Haram al-Sharif (Temple Mount). The first document, from June 1307, is an acknowledgement by three of Ein Arik's Muslim residents, Muhammad ibn Zikri ibn Muflih, Abdallah ibn Muhammad ibn Sulayman, and Isma'il ibn Ahmad ibn Umar, of their obligation to pay 950 dirhams to the waqf from the sale of Ein Arik's figs, apricots and apples. The second document, dated c. 1308–1309, identifies two of the aforementioned residents as village ru'asa (headmen; sing. ra'is), and is another acknowledgement of a debt owed to the waqf from the sale of the village's fruit orchards. A third document from around the same time lists three other Muslim ru'asa of Ein Arik acknowledge both their debt to the waqf and the seeds provided to them for the cultivation of grain.

During this period, Ein Arik was distinguished from other villages in the Palestinian highlands, which largely grew grain and olives, for its vineyards and other fruit orchards, namely grapes, figs, walnuts, almonds, apricots and apples, as well as grain. According to historian Yossef Rapoport, the reliance on orchard farming indicated more personal investment by the growers and implied a greater share of private ownership, in contrast to the communal farming prevalent in other Palestinian villages at the time. By extension, Ein Arik appears to have lacked the presence of large clans in contrast to the communal villages in the area. Rapoport suggests that while the headmen of Ein Arik were Muslims—probably as this was a requirement to hold the position—the majority of its residents were Christians during this century.

=== Ottoman period ===
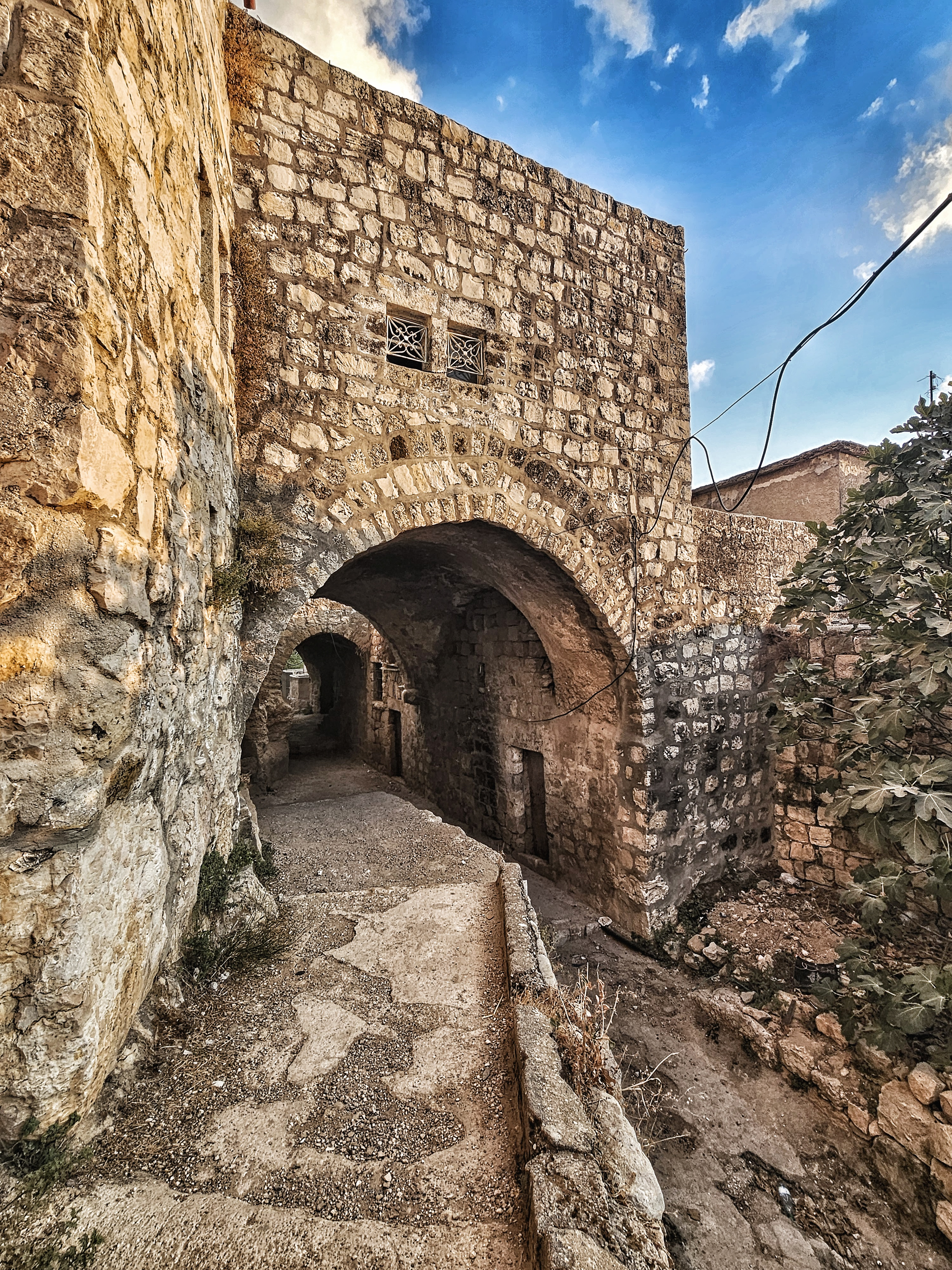
Buildings in Ein Arik's old village core

Palestine, was incorporated into the Ottoman Empire in 1516, and in 1596, Ein Arik was listed in Ottoman tax registers as being in the nahiya of Jerusalem, part of the Jerusalem Sanjak. It had a total population of 24 households, 14 Muslim and 10 Christian. The villagers paid taxes on wheat, barley, olive trees, vineyards and fruit trees, goats and beehives; a total of 4,300 akçe. Rapoport notes that the Muslim majority that developed in villages such as Ein Arik in the 16th century likely resulted from a process of rural conversion from Christianity to Islam, presaged by the appointment of Muslim headmen during the Mamluk period.

In 1838, Edward Robinson noted it as a partly Christian village, with 25 Christian men, and the rest Muslims. It waslocated in the Bani Harith district, north of Jerusalem. In 1870 the French explorer Victor Guérin found Ein Arik to have "forty small houses, inhabited by half Muslim, half Greek schismatics, who have a church." An Ottoman village list of about the same year, 1870, showed that Ein Arik had 41 houses with 179 Muslim men, and 24 houses with 80 Greek Christian men; a total of 65 houses with 259 men. The population count included men, only. In 1883, the PEF's Survey of Western Palestine described Ein Arik as "A small stone hamlet in a deep valley with a Greek church, the inhabitants being Greek Christians. There is a good spring to the west with a small stream. The place is surrounded with olives, and there are lemons and other trees round the water in a thick grove." In 1896 the population of Ein Arik was estimated to be about 471 persons; half Christian and half Muslim.

=== British Mandate period ===
In the 1922 census of Palestine conducted by the British Mandate authorities, Ein Arik had a population of 365; 165 Muslims and 200 Christians; 144 Greek Orthodox, 56 Roman Catholics, increasing in the 1931 census, to 494; 220 Christians and 274 Muslims, living in a total of 117 houses.

In the 1945 statistics, the population of Ein Arik was 610; 360 Muslims and 250 Christians, while the total land area was 5,934 dunams, according to an official land and population survey. Of this, 2,203 were allocated for plantations and irrigable land, 1,168 for cereals, while 32 dunams were classified as built-up areas.

=== Jordanian period ===
In the wake of the 1948 Arab–Israeli War, and after the 1949 Armistice Agreements, Ein Arik came under Jordanian rule.

In 1961, the population of Ein Arik was 1,385, of whom 260 were Christian.

=== 1967 and aftermath ===
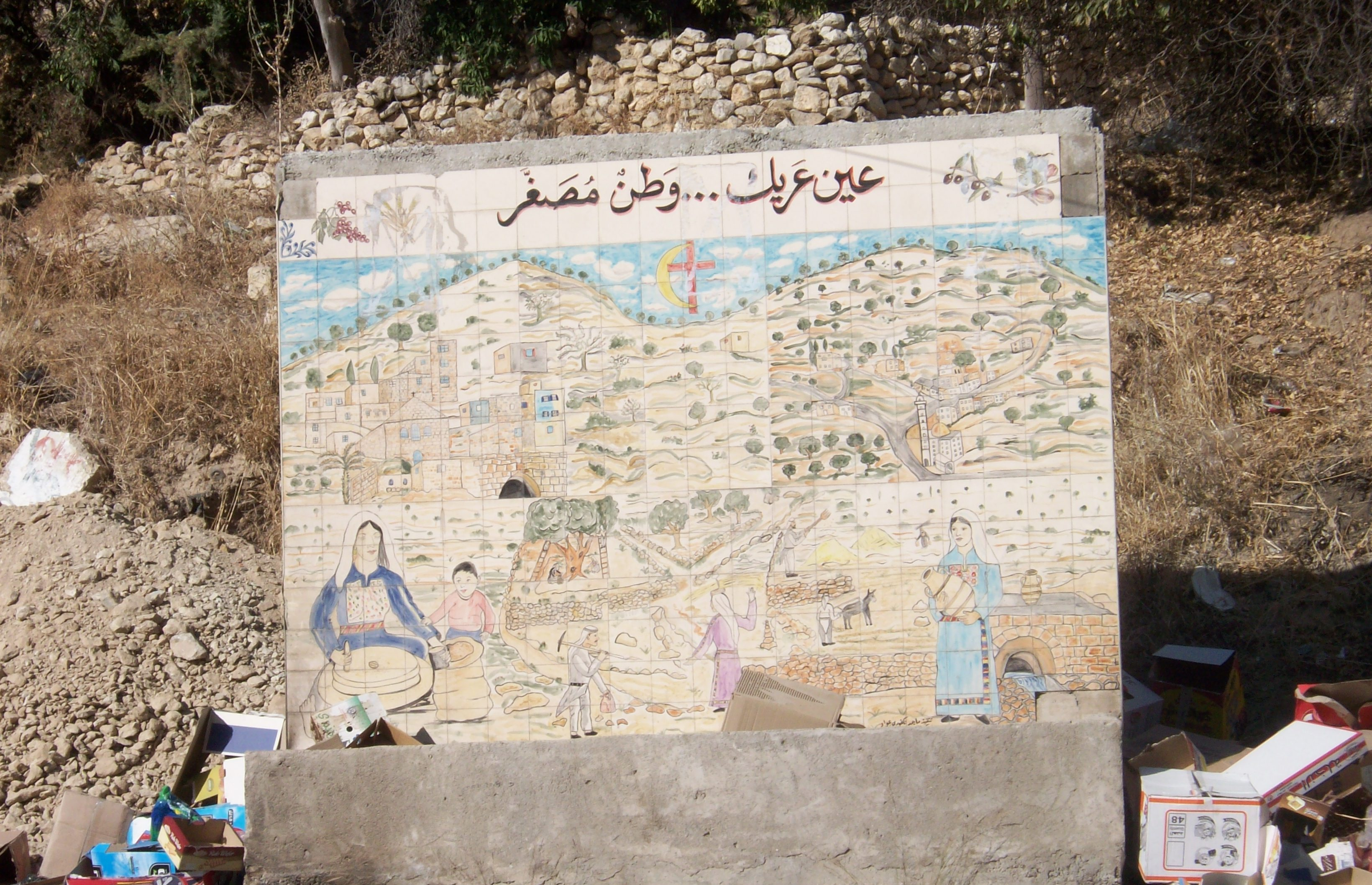
A drawing in Ein Arik

Since the Six-Day War in 1967, Ein Arik has been under Israeli occupation, and according to the Israeli census of that year, the population of Ein Arik stood at 642, of whom 215 were registered as having come from Israel.

After the 1995 accords, 7.3% of village land has been defined as Area B land, while the remaining 92.7% is Area C.

In 1997, it was described by Finkelstein and Lederman as "a small village surrounded by groves".

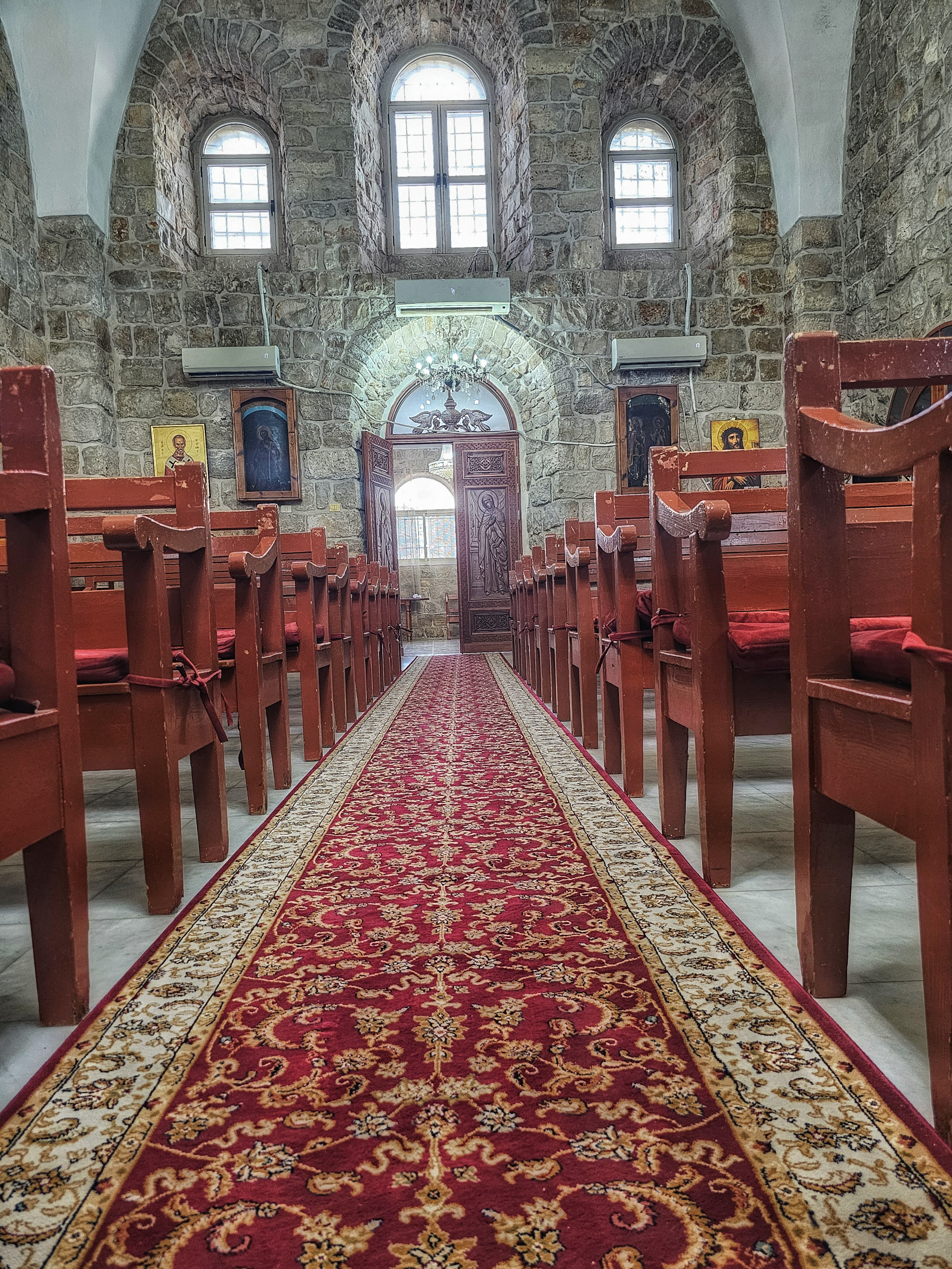
The Orthodox church at Ein Arik

There are two churches located in the village, one Orthodox Christian and the other one is Roman Catholic Couvent Saint-Etienn. One mosque is located in the center of the village and has the tallest minaret in all of Palestine. Two-thirds of its inhabitants are Palestinian Muslims, and the remaining one-third are Palestinian Christians. The village council which consists of mostly Muslims is chaired by a Christian. Both Christians and Muslims have been living together since early on harmoniously by respecting each other's religion.

Ein Arik is known for the natural springs that run through the village and pour into the valley. Both springs, up until the year 2000, were used for drinking and cooking. The village has a large lush valley filled with fruit trees. In 1948 when Palestinians were exiled from their villages some refugees from different villages settled in Ein Arik due to the accessibility of clean water.

== Shrine of A-Sheikh Hussein ==
Ein 'Arik is home to a shrine locally known as A-Sheikh Hussein (Arabic: الشيخ حسين). It is considered the tomb of a local saint, who also gave his name to the village's mosque which was built on the remains of an earlier church. There, the locals perform their ceremonies, swear in the saint's name, regard anyone swearing there as a speaker of truth, and hold that anyone who disobeys vows made at the tomb will ultimately be killed. A large oak tree that is thought to be three hundred years old is growing close to the tomb. The saint's tomb sanctifies a nearby spring known as 'Ein al-Foqa whose waters are believed to cure urinary retention (but only if consumed before the stars appear).

According to one tradition, this is where John the Baptist's tomb is located. They believe that he was also known as Hussein, and the church on which the shrine was constructed was called "Church of John the Baptist". Uri suggested that this site may be associated with A-Sheikh Hussein Ibn Sa'id a-Samkhan, who led the Qays tribes in Samaria at the time of the Egyptian conquest of the Levant in the early 19th century.

== See also ==
- Palestinian Christians
- Latin Patriarchate School of 'Ain 'Arik
- 2007 PCBS Census

== Bibliography ==
- Barron, J.B., ed. (1923). Palestine: Report and General Abstracts of the Census of 1922. Government of Palestine.
- Conder, C.R.; Kitchener, H.H. (1883). The Survey of Western Palestine: Memoirs of the Topography, Orography, Hydrography, and Archaeology. Vol. 3. London: Committee of the Palestine Exploration Fund.
- Dauphin, C. (1998). La Palestine byzantine, Peuplement et Populations. BAR International Series 726 (in French). Vol. III : Catalogue. Oxford: Archeopress. ISBN 0-860549-05-4.
- Finkelstein, I.; Lederman, Zvi, eds. (1997). Highlands of many cultures. Tel Aviv: Institute of Archaeology of Tel Aviv University Publications Section. ISBN 965-440-007-3.
- Government of Jordan, Department of Statistics (1964). First Census of Population and Housing. Volume I: Final Tables; General Characteristics of the Population (PDF).
- Government of Palestine, Department of Statistics (1945). Village Statistics, April, 1945.
- Guérin, V. (1875). Description Géographique Historique et Archéologique de la Palestine (in French). Vol. 2: Samarie, pt. 2. Paris: L'Imprimerie Nationale.
- Hadawi, S. (1970). Village Statistics of 1945: A Classification of Land and Area ownership in Palestine. Palestine Liberation Organization Research Center.
- Hartmann, M. (1883). "Die Ortschaftenliste des Liwa Jerusalem in dem türkischen Staatskalender für Syrien auf das Jahr 1288 der Flucht (1871)". Zeitschrift des Deutschen Palästina-Vereins. 6: 102–149.
- Hütteroth, W.-D.; Abdulfattah, K. (1977). Historical Geography of Palestine, Transjordan and Southern Syria in the Late 16th Century. Erlanger Geographische Arbeiten, Sonderband 5. Erlangen, Germany: Vorstand der Fränkischen Geographischen Gesellschaft. ISBN 3-920405-41-2.
- Mills, E., ed. (1932). Census of Palestine 1931. Population of Villages, Towns and Administrative Areas. Jerusalem: Government of Palestine.
- Palmer, E.H. (1881). The Survey of Western Palestine: Arabic and English Name Lists Collected During the Survey by Lieutenants Conder and Kitchener, R. E. Transliterated and Explained by E.H. Palmer. Committee of the Palestine Exploration Fund.
- Pringle, D. (1997). Secular buildings in the Crusader Kingdom of Jerusalem: an archaeological Gazetter. Cambridge University Press. p. 116. ISBN 978-0-521-46010-1.
- Pringle, D. (2009). The Churches of the Crusader Kingdom of Jerusalem: The cities of Acre and Tyre with Addenda and Corrigenda to Volumes I-III. Vol. IV. Cambridge University Press. ISBN 978-0-521-85148-0.
- Rapoport, Yossef (2025). Becoming Arab: The Formation of Arab Identity in the Medieval Middle East. Princeton: Princeton University Press. ISBN 9780691210636.
- Robinson, E.; Smith, E. (1841). Biblical Researches in Palestine, Mount Sinai and Arabia Petraea: A Journal of Travels in the year 1838. Vol. 2. Boston: Crocker & Brewster.
- Robinson, E.; Smith, E. (1841). Biblical Researches in Palestine, Mount Sinai and Arabia Petraea: A Journal of Travels in the year 1838. Vol. 3. Boston: Crocker & Brewster.
- Schick, C. (1896). "Zur Einwohnerzahl des Bezirks Jerusalem". Zeitschrift des Deutschen Palästina-Vereins. 19: 120–127.
- Socin, A. (1879). "Alphabetisches Verzeichniss von Ortschaften des Paschalik Jerusalem". Zeitschrift des Deutschen Palästina-Vereins. 2: 135–163.
