= Terrorist incidents in Pakistan in 2019 =

Terrorist incidents in Pakistan in 2019 include:

== January ==
- 5 January - Six people, including two women, were injured in an improvised explosive device (IED) blast in Peshawar. The IED was planted in a car parked next to Sunehri Masjid in Peshawar Cantonment.
- 6 January - At least nine people were injured in an IED blast in Jan Adda area of Pishin District. The IED planted in a motorcycle targeted a Balochistan Levies vehicle. Another two people, including a security man, were injured in a motorcycle blast near a Frontier Corps vehicle in Panjgur.
- 9 January - A Karachi-Islamabad RLNG pipeline was targeted by a timed explosive device near Bhong in Rahim Yar Khan District. No casualties were reported as a result of the incident.
- 29 January - January 2019 Loralai attack - 9 people including 8 policemen and a civilian were killed while 22 others were injured when gunmen and suicide bombers attacked a Deputy Inspector General's (DIG) office. The Tehrik-i-Taliban claimed responsibility for the attack.

== February ==
- 16 February - Armed men attacked and killed two Frontier Corps in Loralai. Later on 17 February 2019, another attack took place on Pakistani security personnel in which four members of the Frontier Corps were killed in the Gardab area of Panjgur District. The attack was carried out by the Baloch Raji Ajoi Sangar (BRAS), an alliance of three Balochi terrorist organizations, the Baloch Liberation Army, Balochistan Liberation Front and Baloch Republican Guard. These attacks were preceded by the January 2019 Loralai attack in Balochistan in which eight policemen and a civilian were killed by gunmen and suicide bombers affiliated with Tehrik-i-Taliban Pakistan on 29 January 2019.

== April ==
12 April - 2019 Quetta attack

18 April - gunmen massacred several passengers travelling from Karachi to Gwadar in Makran, Balochistan, Pakistan. An estimated 15 to 20 armed militants stopped around five or six buses between 12:30 am and 1 am on a Makran Coastal Road. After the buses halted the gunmen then inspected the identity papers of the passengers and had about 16 of them disembark. At least 14 were shot dead, while two passengers managed to escape from the gunmen and travelled to the closest Balochistan Levies checkpost. They were later transported to Ormara Hospital for treatment. Law enforcement and Levies personnel arrived at the scene shortly afterward and commenced an investigation into the attack. The victims' bodies were taken from the Noor Baksh Hotel. The Baloch Raaji Aajoi Sangar (BRAS), an alliance of ethnic Baloch militant armed groups, took responsibility for the massacre in an email statement. "... those who were targeted carried [identification] cards of the Pakistan Navy and Coast Guards, and they were only killed after they were identified." Raaji Aajoi Sangar, the spokesperson for the Baloch, said in the statement.

== May ==
- 8 May - At least 13 people were Killed in a 2019 Lahore bombing suicide attack outside Data Darbar in Lahore.
- 21 May - At least 5 people were Killed in an attack on Pearl Continental Hotel in port city Quetta.

== June ==
26 June - Three suicide bombers were killed by the security forces to stop a terrorist attack on Police Line in Loralai. One policeman was also killed and five people were injured in the attack.

== July ==
- 21 July - At least seven people were killed in a suicide attack at a hospital in Dera Ismail Khan.
- 27 July - Pakistan Army's 10 personnel were killed in two separate attacks in North Waziristan and Balochistan.
