= Murder of Dvir Sorek =

2019 stabbing in the West Bank

- Part of the Israeli–Palestinian conflict
- Native name: רצח דביר שורק
- Location: Migdal Oz, West Bank
- Date: 7 August 2019; 7 years ago 20:30 pm (UTC+2)
- Attack type: Attempted hostage-taking, stabbing
- Weapons: Knife, taser
- Deaths: 1 civilian (Dvir Sorek)
- No. of participants: 2
- Motive: Anti-Semitism

On 7 August 2019, 18-year-old yeshiva student Dvir Sorek was stabbed to death near the Israeli settlement of Migdal Oz.

== Incident ==
Sorek was an 18-year-old Yeshiva student, was traveling alone from his yeshiva (named Machanayim) to Jerusalem to buy books for his rabbis as a gift for the end of the school year. He was apparently attacked on his way back, by (it was believed) two assailants, near a bus stop. Despite initially believing that his death was a kidnapping, Israeli security forces came to the conclusion that Soreks' death was a premeditated murder.

Two Palestinian men, 24-year-old Nazir Saleh Khalil Atafra and 30-year-old Qasem Araf Khalil Atafra, were arrested for the murder. Their houses were demolished.

== Funeral ==
His funeral was held in Ofra, where Sorek’s family resided, the next day and thousands of people attended. Sorek’s father performed the eulogy.

== Reactions ==
- The United Nations peace envoy, Nickolay Mladenov, called the killing a "dangerous act."
- The United Kingdom ambassador to Israel, Neil Wigan, hoped that the killers would "be brought to justice."

== Aftermath ==
Two Palestinians accused of the murder were captured by Israeli soldiers in the village of Beit Kahil outside Hebron. The suspects were identified as 24-year-old Nazir Saleh Khalil Atafra, a Hamas terrorist, and 30-year-old Qasem Araf Khalil Atafra. Qassem was also convicted of a 2011 attempted murder of two Israeli civilians in Beersheba. In December 2021, the two cousins were sentenced to life imprisonment. Qassem was given a 40-year sentence, with Nasir handed an additional 20 years.

== See also ==
- List of terrorist incidents in August 2019
- Murder of Ori Ansbacher (February 2019)
- Murder of Rina Shnerb (23 August 2019)
