= Ein Qiniya =

- Local Development Committee

Arabic transcription(s)
  - Arabic: عين قينيا
  - Latin: Ayn Kiniya (official); Ein Qinya (unofficial)
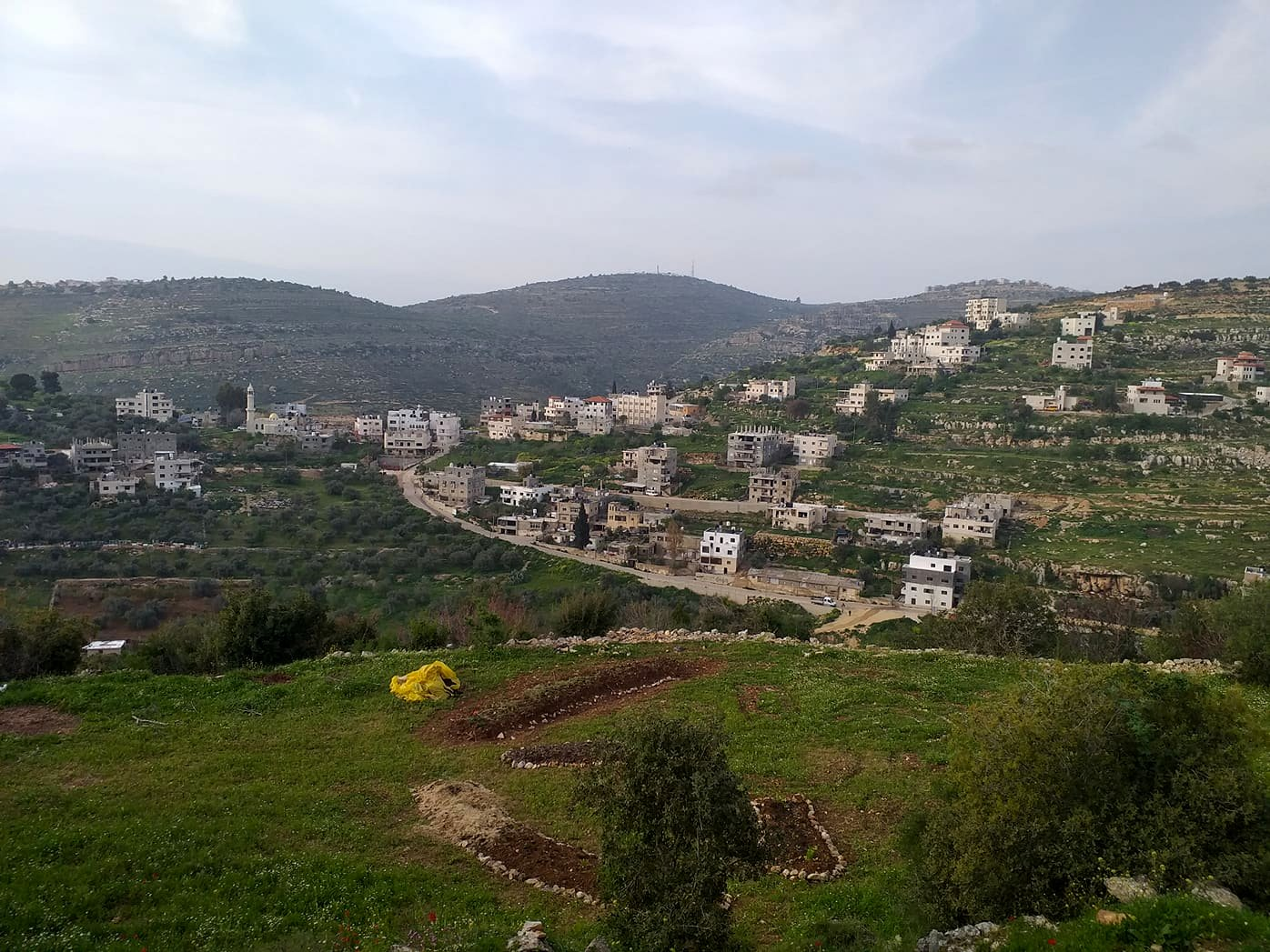
- Ein Qiniya 2019

- Location of Ein Qiniya within Palestine Ein Qiniya (State of Palestine)
- Coordinates: 31°55′37″N 35°08′56″E
- Palestine grid: 164/148
- State: State of Palestine
- Governorate: Ramallah and al-Bireh

Government
  - Type: Local Development Committee

Population (2017)
  - Total: 721
- Name meaning: The crimson spring

Ein Qiniya or 'Ayn Kiniya (Arabic: عين قينيا) is a Palestinian village in the northern West Bank, located 7 kilometers (4.3 mi) northwest of Ramallah and part of the Ramallah and al-Bireh Governorate of the State of Palestine. Ein Qiniya has existed since the Roman-era of rule in Palestine. The village is very small with no public structures or institutions and is governed by a local development committee. Ein Qiniya is regionally notable for being a spring and autumn time picnic resort.

There is an annual walk on March 4 from Ramallah to Ein Qiniyya in celebration of the spring.

== Location ==
'Ein Qiniya is located (horizontally) 5.5 km west of Ramallah. It is bordered by Ramallah to the east, Al-Zaitounah to the north, Al-Janiya and Deir Ibzi to the west, and Ein 'Arik and Beitunia to the south.

=== Important Bird Area ===
A 1,500 ha site in the vicinity of the village has been recognised as an Important Bird Area (IBA) by BirdLife International because it supports a population of short-toed snake-eagles.

== History ==
A Middle Bronze Age tomb was discovered here in 1934. Potsherds from the Hellenistic and Umayyad/Abbasid period have been found here. Conder and Kitchener, from the Palestine Exploration Fund (PEF), suggested the identification of Ein Qinniya with En Gannim, mentioned by third-century writer Eusebius as a village near Bethel.

Ein Qiniya has traditionally been identified with Ainqune of the Crusader era, one of the fiefs given by King Godfrey to the Church of the Holy Sepulchre. However, Finkelstein writes that this identification should be reconsidered. Potsherds from the Mamluk era have also been found here.

During the Mamluk era, it was stipulated that the whole of the revenue from Ein Qiniya should go to the al-Tankiziyya in Jerusalem. The building was completed in 1328–29.

=== Ottoman era ===
In 1517, the village was included in the Ottoman Empire with the rest of Palestine, and in the 1596 tax-records it appeared as Ayn Qinya, located in the Nahiya of Jabal Quds of the Liwa of Al-Quds. The population was 32 households, all Muslim. They paid a tax rate of 33.3% on agricultural products, which included wheat, barley, summer crops, olive trees, vineyards and fruit trees, occasional revenues, goats and beehives; a total of 4,760 akçe. 1/3 of the income went to a waqf.

In 1838 it was noted as 'Ain Kinia, a Muslim village, located in the Beni Harith district, north of Jerusalem.

An official Ottoman village list from about 1870 showed that Ain Kina had 54 houses and a population of 205, though the population count only included men.

In 1882, the PEF's Survey of Western Palestine (SWP) described Ain Kanieh as "a village of moderate size on a ridge".

In 1896 the population of 'Ain kinja was estimated to be about 135 persons.

=== British Mandate era ===
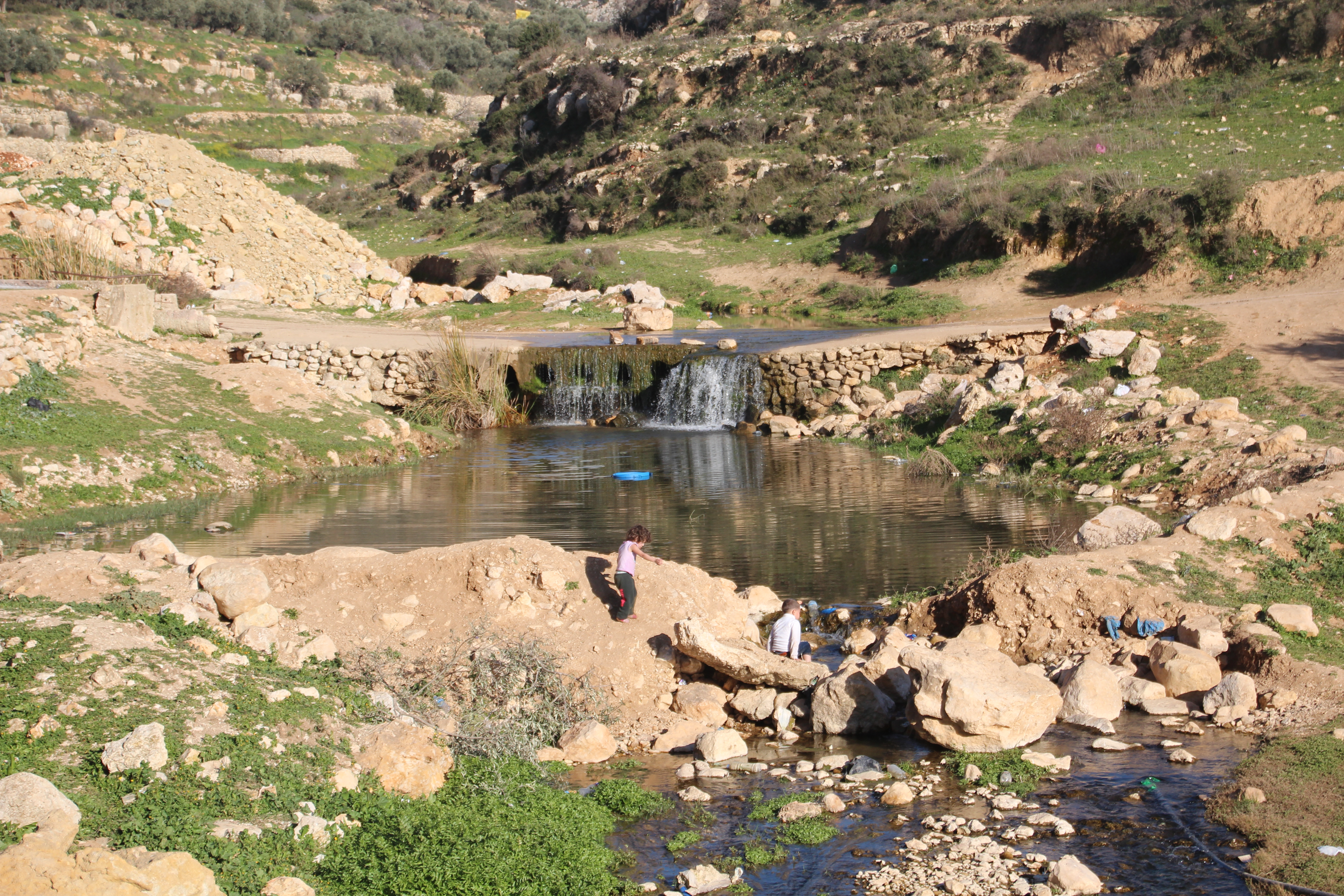
Spring, at Ein Qiniya

In 1917, most of the village's inhabitants were evacuated by the British army on suspicion that residents killed a British officer. The residents were relocated to Beitunia and Yalo. In the 1922 census of Palestine, conducted by the British Mandate authorities, 'Ain Qinia had a population of 56, all Muslims. This had increased in the 1931 census to 83, still all Muslims, in a total of 26 houses.

In the 1945 statistics the population was 100, all Muslims, while the total land area was 2,494 dunams, according to an official land and population survey. Of this, 1,276 were allocated for plantations and irrigable land, 569 for cereals, while 19 dunams were classified as built-up (urban) areas.

=== Jordanian era ===
In the wake of the 1948 Arab–Israeli War, and after the 1949 Armistice Agreements, Ein Qiniya came under Jordanian rule.

The Jordanian census of 1961 found 235 inhabitants.

=== 1967 and after ===
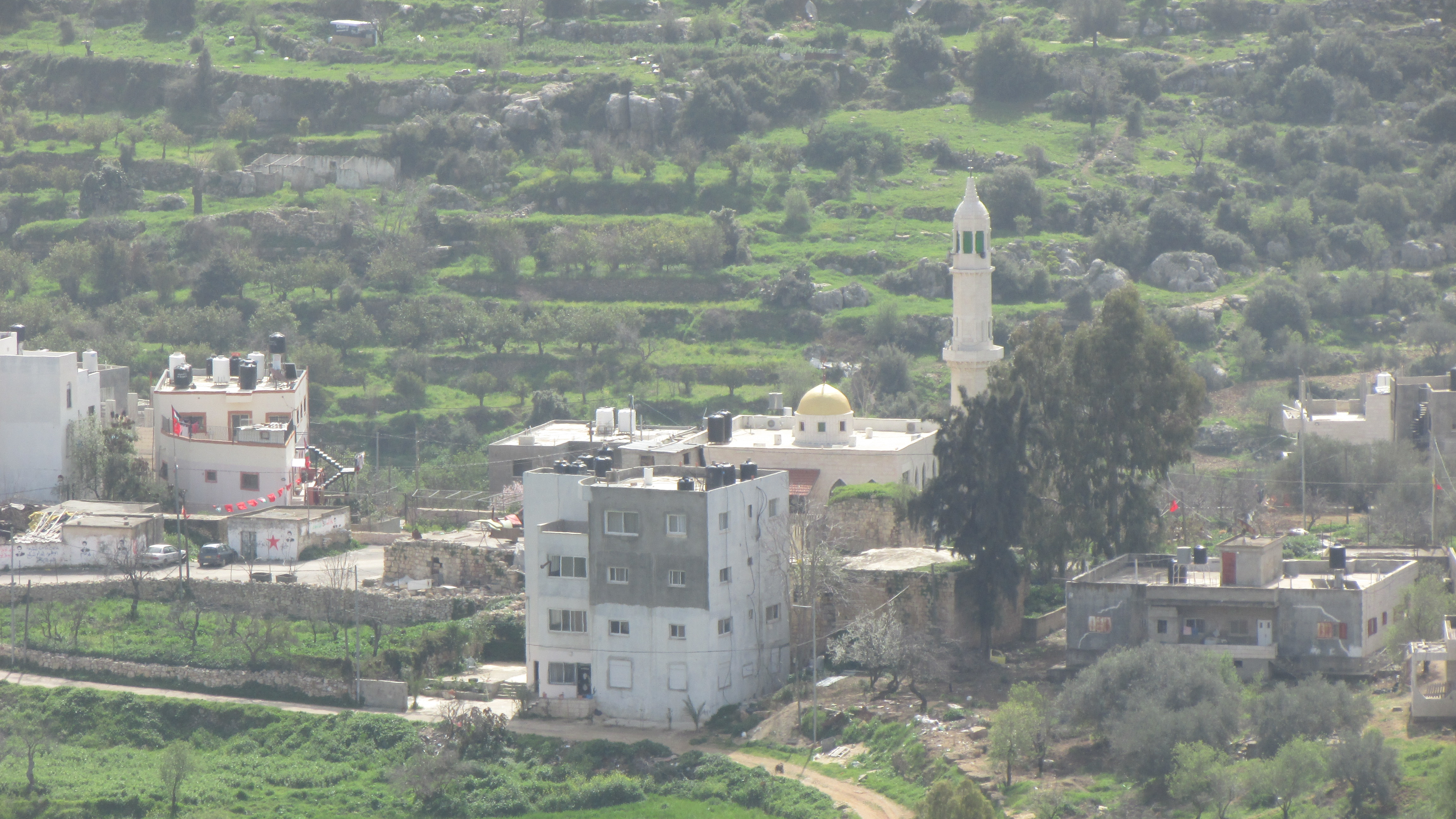
A mosque in Ein Qiniya

Since the Six-Day War in 1967 Ein Qiniya has been under Israeli occupation.

After the 1995 accords 12.1% of village land was classified as Area B, the remaining 87.9% as Area C.

Israel has confiscated 157 dunams of village land in order to construct the Israeli settlement of Dolev.

In 1982, residents numbered 101, then after a mass migration of other Palestinians to the Ein Qiniya, the population rose to 464 in 1984. According to the Palestinian Central Bureau of Statistics, in 2006 it had a population of 807. In the 2007 PCBS census, there were 817 people living in the village. The village had a population of 721 by 2017.

== Bibliography ==
- Barron, J.B., ed. (1923). Palestine: Report and General Abstracts of the Census of 1922. Government of Palestine.
- Burgoyne, Michael Hamilton (1987). Mamluk Jerusalem. ISBN 090503533X.
- Conder, C.R.; Kitchener, H.H. (1882). The Survey of Western Palestine: Memoirs of the Topography, Orography, Hydrography, and Archaeology. Vol. 2. London: Committee of the Palestine Exploration Fund.
- Conder, C.R.; Kitchener, H.H. (1883). The Survey of Western Palestine: Memoirs of the Topography, Orography, Hydrography, and Archaeology. Vol. 3. London: Committee of the Palestine Exploration Fund.
- Finkelstein, I.; Lederman, Zvi, eds. (1997). Highlands of many cultures. Tel Aviv: Institute of Archaeology of Tel Aviv University Publications Section. ISBN 965-440-007-3.
- Government of Jordan, Department of Statistics (1964). First Census of Population and Housing. Volume I: Final Tables; General Characteristics of the Population (PDF).
- Government of Palestine, Department of Statistics (1945). Village Statistics, April, 1945.
- Hadawi, S. (1970). Village Statistics of 1945: A Classification of Land and Area ownership in Palestine. Palestine Liberation Organization Research Center.
- Hartmann, M. (1883). "Die Ortschaftenliste des Liwa Jerusalem in dem türkischen Staatskalender für Syrien auf das Jahr 1288 der Flucht (1871)". Zeitschrift des Deutschen Palästina-Vereins. 6: 102–149.
- Hütteroth, W.-D.; Abdulfattah, K. (1977). Historical Geography of Palestine, Transjordan and Southern Syria in the Late 16th Century. Erlanger Geographische Arbeiten, Sonderband 5. Erlangen, Germany: Vorstand der Fränkischen Geographischen Gesellschaft. ISBN 3-920405-41-2.
- Mills, E., ed. (1932). Census of Palestine 1931. Population of Villages, Towns and Administrative Areas. Jerusalem: Government of Palestine.
- Palmer, E.H. (1881). The Survey of Western Palestine: Arabic and English Name Lists Collected During the Survey by Lieutenants Conder and Kitchener, R. E. Transliterated and Explained by E.H. Palmer. Committee of the Palestine Exploration Fund.
- Robinson, E.; Smith, E. (1841). Biblical Researches in Palestine, Mount Sinai and Arabia Petraea: A Journal of Travels in the year 1838. Vol. 3. Boston: Crocker & Brewster.
- Rosière, de, E., ed. (1849). Cartulaire de l'église du Saint Sépulchre de Jérusalem: publié d'après les manuscrits du Vatican (in Latin and French). Paris: Imprimerie nationale.
- Röhricht, R. (1887). "Studien zur mittelalterlichen Geographie und Topographie Syriens". Zeitschrift des Deutschen Palästina-Vereins. 10: 195–344.
- Röhricht, R. (1893). (RRH) Regesta regni Hierosolymitani (MXCVII-MCCXCI) (in Latin). Berlin: Libraria Academica Wageriana. (Röhricht, 1893, RRH, pp. 16-17, No 74)
- Schick, C. (1896). "Zur Einwohnerzahl des Bezirks Jerusalem". Zeitschrift des Deutschen Palästina-Vereins. 19: 120–127.
- Socin, A. (1879). "Alphabetisches Verzeichniss von Ortschaften des Paschalik Jerusalem". Zeitschrift des Deutschen Palästina-Vereins. 2: 135–163.
- Toledano, E. (1984). "The Sanjaq of Jerusalem in the Sixteenth Century: Aspects of Topography and Population". Archivum Ottomanicum. 9: 279–319. Archived from the original on 2016-03-05.
