= July 2019 Farah bombing =

Taliban attack in Afghanistan

On 31 July 2019, a roadside bomb killed 34 civilians and injured another 17 who were on a bus in Farah Province, Afghanistan. President Ashraf Ghani's spokesman confirmed that the perpetrators were the Taliban.

== The bombing ==
On 31 July 2019, at 8am, a high explosive bomb attack was carried out on a passenger bus on the Herat-Kandahar highway in Farah, western Afghanistan, bordering Iran. The roadside IED killed 34 passengers. Another 17 people were injured after the explosive device detonated. The victims and injured were all defenseless civilians, most of them women and children.

== Claims of responsibility, motivation ==
No group has claimed responsibility, but the Taliban is the only extremist group known to operate in the area and frequently uses IEDs in attacks. The bloodshed took place in the midst of efforts to conclude a US peace agreement with the Taliban, presumably to strengthen their negotiating position through deterrence.
