= 2019 Lahore bombing =

Suicide bomb attack on 8 May 2019 outside Data Darbar in Lahore, Pakistan

- Part of Insurgency in Khyber Pakhtunkhwa
- Location: Lahore, Punjab, Pakistan
- Date: 8 May 2019; 08:44am
- Attack type: Suicide bombing
- Deaths: 13
- Injuries: 24
- Perpetrator: Jamaat-ul-Ahrar
- Motive: Terrorism; Sectarian violence in Pakistan

The 2019 Lahore bombing was a suicide bomb attack on Wednesday 8 May 2019, one day after the beginning of the Muslim holy month of Ramadan, outside Data Darbar in Lahore, Pakistan. CCTV footage of the blast showed that at 8:45 am, an explosion occurred outside Data Darbar's second gate (The entrance for female visitors) (Bukhari). According to the Punjab chief minister's spokesperson, Shahbaz Gill- the suicide bomber- was a 15-year-old boy (Imran). The boy came out of a nearby fruit shop, walked to a police van, and detonated the bomb. The blast immediately killed 6 police officers, 4 civilians, and injured circa 26.

== Response and Investigation ==
Once the explosion registered, the area went into panic causing emergency response forces to be delayed due to the large number of visitors. This led to three more people dying after the explosion, one civilian and a police officer outside the Data Darbar from wounds, and one civilian while aid was being administered (Imran). Soon after an evacuation was finished, security forces swept across the nearby area to establish a perimeter around the site, setting up checkpoints and alerting hospitals and other shrines(Riaz). Officials released the following statement: "Police were the prime target in this attack. We are collecting forensic evidence to ascertain the nature of the blast," said Ashfaq Khan, deputy inspector general of police operations in Lahore. After the perimeter had been set up, an initial probe taken by a heavy contingent of police, counter-terrorism units, and forensic officials showed that the bomb contained 7 kilograms of explosive material and was stored in the teenager's jacket (Imran). The attack was claimed by the Hizbul Ahrar, a splinter group of the Pakistani Taliban, a movement that has been fighting the government for years. In a statement, the group said the attack targeted police and had been timed to avoid civilian casualties. However, police said a general security alert was in force but there had been no specific warning about a threat to the Data Darbar, which was protected by heavy layers of security(U.S Bureau of Counterterrorism).

== Aftermath ==
The next day on Thursday May 9, 2019, police raided a building in Lahore's Garhi Shahu area, arresting four suspects. Officials said one of the arrested suspects was the rickshaw driver who transported the suicide bomber to Data Darbar. Then, on Friday May 10, 2019, a joint investigation team (JIT) was founded by the provincial government to further probe the incident. The team had the following five members: Mr. Sahaib Ashraf, a representative of the Pakistani intelligence bureau, an ISI (Inter-Services Intelligence) representative, a MI (Military Intelligence) representative, investigation officer Muhammud Khalid CTD (Counter Terrorism Department) Lahore(Tribune). Furthermore, many nearby countries released statements regarding the attack. For instance, Turkey's Ministry of Foreign Affairs stated: “We are deeply saddened to hear that a terror attack targeting a police checkpoint at the entrance of a Sufi shrine in Lahore, capital of Punjab Province of Pakistan, resulted in many losses of lives including security officers and left many others wounded. We condemn this heinous terrorist attack perpetrated at a religious site and wish Allah’s mercy upon those who lost their lives, speedy recovery to the wounded and convey our condolences to the friendly Government and the brotherly people of Pakistan.”

== See also ==
- July 2010 Lahore bombings
- List of terrorist incidents in May 2019
- Terrorist incidents in Lahore since 2000
