= 2019 al-Rai bombing =

- Part of Syrian Civil War and Turkish involvement in the Syrian Civil War
- Location: 36°36′42″N 37°26′48″E; Al-Rai, Aleppo Governorate, Syria
- Date: 15 September 2019
- Attack type: Truck bomb
- Deaths: 12 civilians
- Injuries: Many
- Perpetrator: Unknown

A truck bomb exploded outside a hospital on 15 September 2019 in al-Rai, Aleppo Governorate, Syria, killing 12 civilians.

== Attack ==
On the evening of 15 September 2019 a truck bomb was detonated in the parking lot next to Al-Rai Hospital, killing at least 12 and injuring many more civilians, according to the initial report from the White Helmets civil defense group. The explosion and debris also destroyed houses near the hospital, prompting White Helmets to carry out search and rescue operations in the area.

== Casualties ==
12 civilians were killed in the bombing and many were wounded. A pharmacist and two of his children were among those killed, according to the deputy head of the town council, Alaa al-Hammad.

== Reactions ==
Turkish Vice President Fuat Oktay condemned the incident on Twitter saying, "Terror targets indiscriminately all humanity. Turkey will resolutely continue its fight against terror inside and outside of its borders".
