= Dolev =

Israeli settlement in the West Bank

Dolev: דולב (Hebrew)
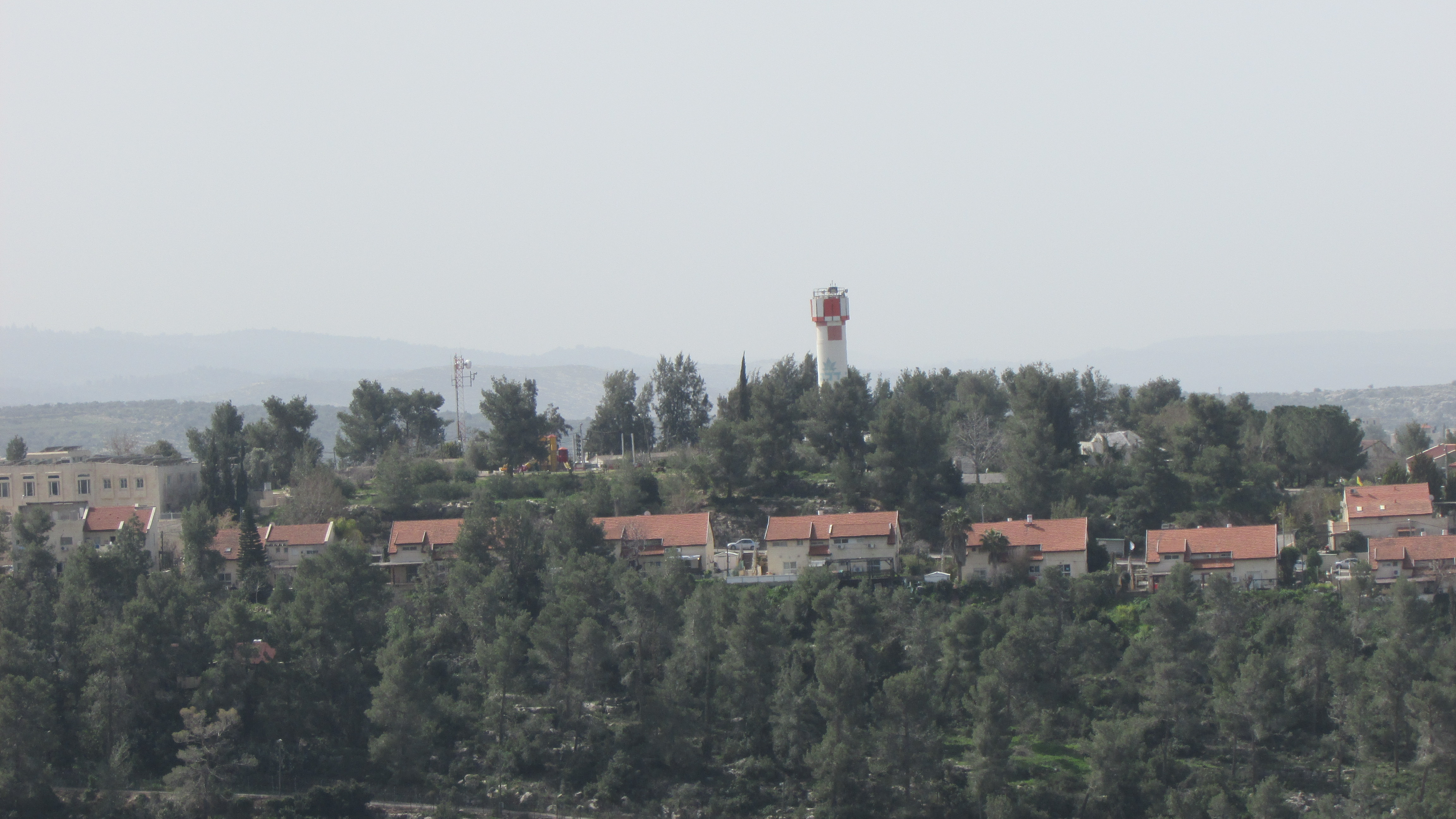

- Location within the Central West Bank Location within the West Bank
- Coordinates: 31°55′33″N 35°8′7″E
- Country: Palestine
- District: Judea and Samaria Area
- Council: Mateh Binyamin
- Region: West Bank
- Affiliation: Amana
- Founded: 1983
- Population (2024): 1,593

Dolev (Hebrew: דולב) is an Israeli settlement organized as a community settlement in the West Bank. Located 17 mi (27 km) north-west of Jerusalem, it falls under the jurisdiction of Mateh Binyamin Regional Council. In 2024 it had a population of 1,593.

The international community considers Israeli settlements in the West Bank illegal under international law, but the Israeli government disputes this.

== History ==
Dolev was established in 1983, by five families who moved to the site on the festival of Sukkot. It is named for nearby Nahal Dolev where dolev trees (Platanus orientalis) grow. According to ARIJ, the land was confiscated from three Palestinian villages:

- 867 dunams (0.867 km^{2}) from Al-Janiya,
- 157 dunams (0.157 km^{2}) from Ein Qiniya,
- 22 dunams (0.022 km^{2}) from Deir Ibzi, including spring Ein Bubin for irrigation projects.

In 1988, Ulpanat Dolev girls school established a youth rehabilitation program, Dolev Homes for Youth at Risk, which now has branches in Ashdod and Modi'in. In 2013, 450 girls from all over Israel were enrolled in the program. Dolev Homes received the National Award for Excellence in Education for its contribution to Israeli society over a period of 25 years.

On Monday 26 August 2019, Prime Minister Binyamin Netanyahu directed the Director General of the Prime Minister's Office to submit for Planning Committee approval at its next meeting, plans for the establishment of a new neighborhood in Dolev, near the Ein Bubin spring after the murder of Rina Shnerb. The new settlement will include approximately 300 new housing units, according to the plans drawn up by the Prime Minister's Office. On 27 August 2019 it was decided that the new settlement of three hundred homes to be built in Dolev, would be named after Rina Shnerb.

== Notable residents ==
- Moti Yogev (born 1956), Israeli politician (The Jewish Home)
- David Mintz (born 1959), Israeli judge (Supreme Court of Israel)
