= Haska Meyna mosque bombing =

Terrorist attack in Afghanistan in 2019

- Part of War in Afghanistan
- Location of Nangarhar Province in Afghanistan
- Location: Haska Meyna District, Nangarhar Province, Afghanistan
- Date: 18 October 2019
- Attack type: Bombing
- Deaths: 73
- Injuries: 36
- Perpetrator: Unknown

On 18 October 2019, a bombing occurred in a mosque in Haska Meyna District, Nangarhar province, Afghanistan, killing at least 73 worshippers. Dozens more were injured in the attack. No group has claimed responsibility.

== Attack ==
A bomb exploded during Friday prayer at the mosque, located in the Jawdara village of Haska Meyna District. Hundreds were there to take part in the prayer when the bomb detonated killing 72 and injuring at least 36 other people. The blast caused the roof to collapse, leaving many bodies under the rubble. The New York Times reported that the blast was caused by a suicide bomber, who entered the mosque during men's prayer and detonated explosives.

Among the victims of the blast were 23 teenagers and children, along with the village's only doctor, Mohammed Aref, and several of his family members. Two teachers were also killed in the attack.

== Responsibility ==
No group has claimed responsibility for the attack. The Taliban denied responsibility, instead claiming the explosions and collapse of the mosque were caused by a government mortar attack.
