= January 2019 Loralai attack =

Terrorist incident in Pakistan

- Location: Loralai, Balochistan, Pakistan
- Date: 29 January 2019
- Weapon: Bomb
- Deaths: 9
- Injuries: 22

2019 Loralai attack was a terrorist attack that took place on 29 January 2019 in Loralai, Balochistan, Pakistan. Nine people (eight policemen and a civilian) were killed while 22 others were injured when gunmen and suicide bombers attacked a police Deputy Inspector General's (DIG) office. The internationally designated terrorist group Tehrik-i-Taliban Pakistan claimed responsibility for the attack.

The Pashtun Tahafuz Movement protested against the attack and held sit-ins in Balochistan's Quetta and Loralai. However, when the police launched a crackdown against the nonviolent protesters, Arman Loni, one of the leaders of PTM, was killed in Loralai.

Another attack occurred in Loralai on 16 February 2019.

== See also ==
- 2019 Ghotki riots
- 2014 Larkana temple attack
- 2009 Gojra riots
