= 2019 Samaria combined attack =

Terrorist incident in the West Bank

- Part of Israeli–Palestinian conflict
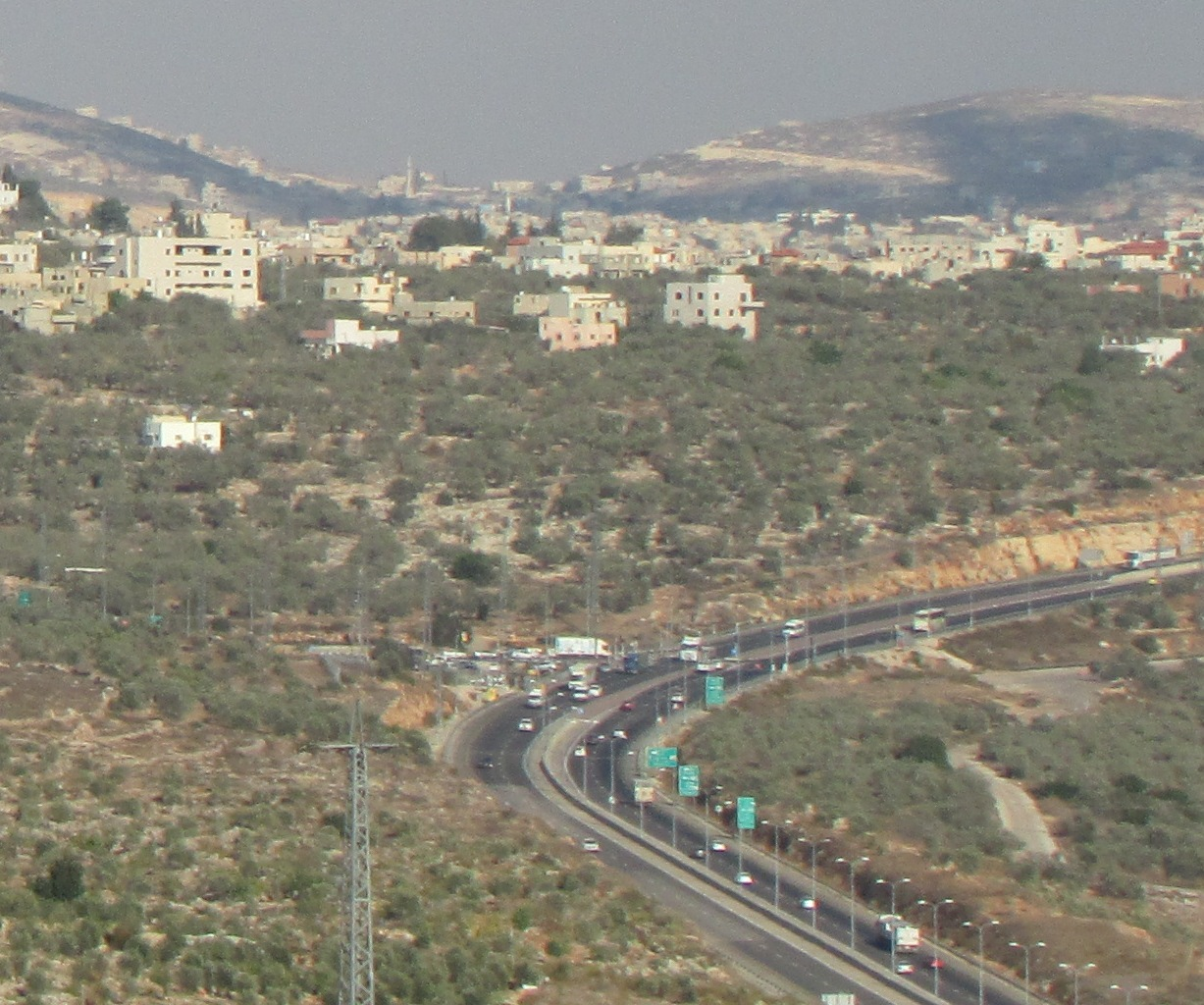
- The Giti Avishar junction, where the second part of the attack took place (the photo was taken from the Barkan industrial zone)
- Location: Ariel junction and the Giti Avishar junction, West Bank
- Date: 17 March 2019; 7 years ago
- Attack type: Stabbing attack, shooting attack
- Weapons: A knife and a rifle taken from an IDF soldier
- Deaths: 3 (Including the perpetrator)
- Injuries: 1
- Perpetrator: Omar Abu Lilah
- Motive: Palestinian nationalist terrorism

On 17 March 2019, a stabbing and shooting attack was carried out by a Palestinian militant at the Ariel junction and Giti Avishar junction in the Samaria region in the West Bank.

One IDF soldier was killed and another was injured. On 18 March, a day after the attack, Rabbi Achiad Ettinger, one of the victims who was head of the Oz and Emuna Yeshiva in the Neve Sha'anan neighborhood in Tel Aviv, died of his injury.

== Background ==
In the six months preceding the attack, several deadly attacks were carried out in Samaria by individual Palestinian militants who attacked Israeli civilians and soldiers, which included among others the shooting attack in the Barkan industrial zone, the shooting attack at Givat Assaf, and the attack at the Ofra junction.

In order to secure the region, an IDF force from the artillery brigade was stationed in the Ariel area which was only trained for one week before being deployed to secure the Ariel area.

== The attack ==
In the morning hours, a Palestinian militant arrived at the Ariel junction in the West Bank and noticed the IDF soldier, Gal Keidan of the Thunder Battalion, securing the bus station at the junction. The militant stabbed him, grabbed his weapon and shot him to death. The IDF soldier who stood next to him did not fire at the attacker, but his commander fired across the road and wounded the attacker.

Rabbi Achiad Ettinger, who was armed, approached the militant, shot him and injured him, but the militant managed to shoot back and critically wounded Ettinger. Afterwards, the militant hijacked a vehicle that approached the junction. He drove to the Giti Avishar junction, where he shot another IDF soldier who as a result was seriously injured.

The militant then drove towards the Palestinian town of Burukin, where he abandoned the vehicle and continued escaping on foot.

== Aftermath ==
On 18 March 18, a day after the attack, Rabbi Achiad Ettinger, who was head of the Oz and Emuna Yeshiva in the Neve Sha'anan neighborhood in Tel Aviv, died of his injury.

== Perpetrator ==
The militant who carried out the attack was Omar Abu Lilah, a 19 year old Palestinian from the village of Zawiya located near Ariel. Abu Lilah was a student at the Al-Quds Open University in Salfit. On 19 March, during an attempt to capture the militant by the IDF and the Shin Bet, a fire exchange took place at the village of 'Abwein, during which the militant was shot and killed.
