= Deir Ibzi =

- Municipality type C

Arabic transcription(s)
  - Arabic: دير إبزيع
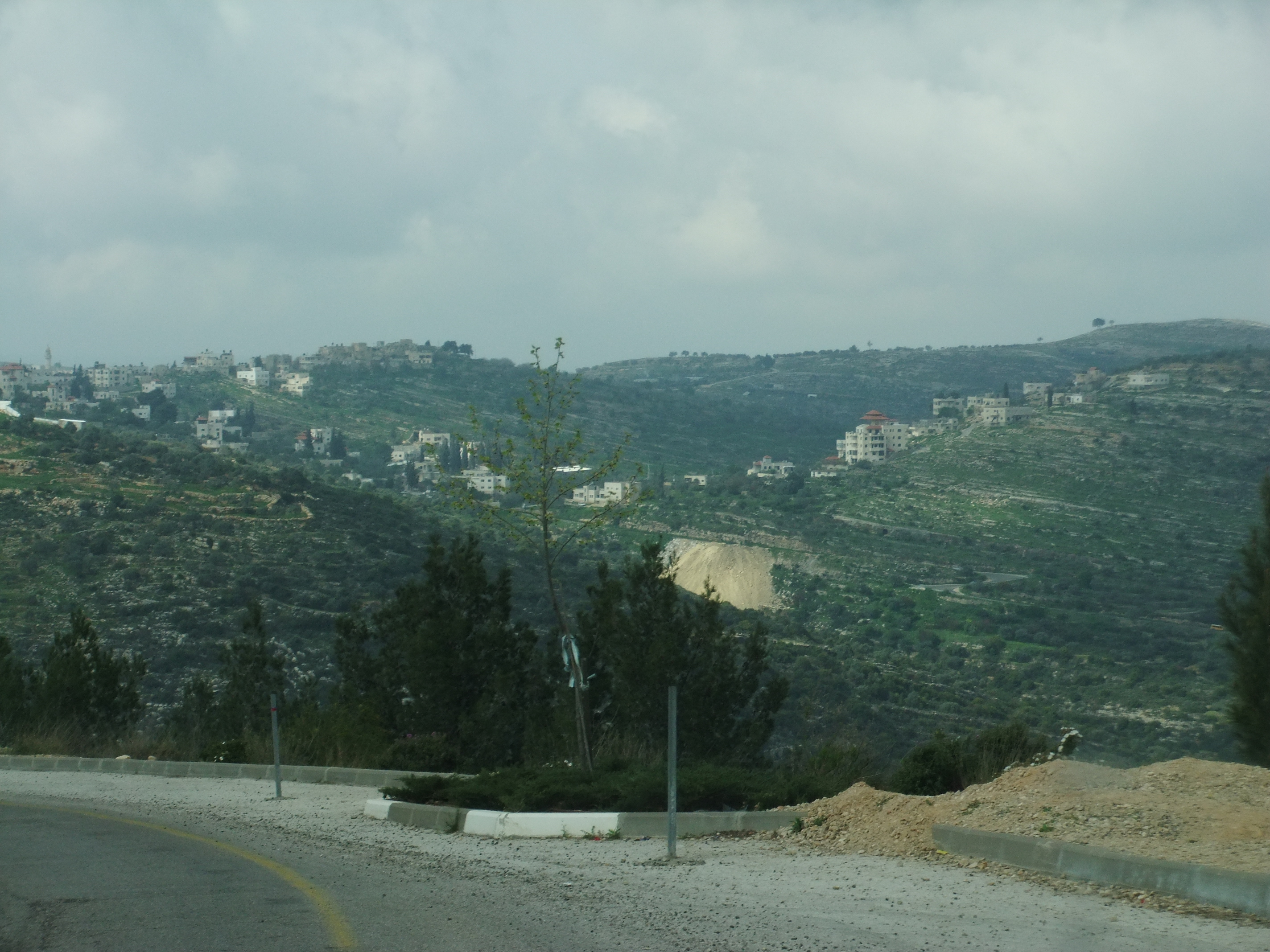
- Deir Ibzi

- Location of Deir Ibzi within Palestine
- Coordinates: 31°54′58″N 35°07′08″E
- Palestine grid: 161/147
- State: State of Palestine
- Governorate: Ramallah and al-Bireh

Government
  - Type: Municipality
- Elevation: 568 m (1,864 ft)

Population (2017)
  - Total: 2,590
- Name meaning: the monastery of Ibzia ('nimble')

Deir Ibzi (Arabic: دير إبزيع) is a Palestinian town in the Ramallah and al-Bireh Governorate, located west of Ramallah in the northern West Bank. According to the Palestinian Central Bureau of Statistics, the town had a population of 2,590 inhabitants in 2017.

== Location ==
Deir Ibzi is located 7.7 kilometers (4.8 mi) (horizontally) west of Ramallah. It is bordered by Ein 'Arik to the south and east, Ein Qiniya to the east and north, Al-Janiya to the north, Kafr Ni'ma and Saffa to the west, and Beit Ur al-Tahta, Beit Ur al-Fauqa and Beitunia to the south.

== History ==
It has been suggested that this was the place mentioned in Crusader sources as Zibi, but this is not supported by archeological evidence, as the earliest potsherds found here date back to the Ottoman period.

=== Ottoman era ===
In 1517, the village came under Ottoman rule with the rest of Palestine and in the 1596 tax-records it was in the Nahiya of Jabal Quds of the Liwa of Al-Quds. The population was 25 households, all Muslim. They paid a fixed tax rate of 33.3% on agricultural products, which included wheat, barley, olive trees, vineyards, fruit trees, goats and beehives in addition to "occasional revenues"; a total of 3,290 akçe. Sherds from the early Ottoman era have been found here.

In 1838 it was noted as Deir Bezi'a, a Muslim village, located in the Beni Harith region, north of Jerusalem.

In 1870, Victor Guérin described the village, which he called Deir Ebzieh, as being: "situated on a summit of very difficult access and contains four hundred inhabitants, all Moslems; some houses are large and fairly well built. I notice with the medhafeh (guest house) a fragment of carved stone which carries the debris of a mutilated rosette." An Ottoman village list of about the same year, 1870, showed that der bezei had 239 inhabitants with 51 houses, though the population count included only the men. It further noted that the village was north of Bethoron, that is, north of Beit Ur al-Fauqa and Beit Ur al-Tahta.

In 1882, the PEF's Survey of Western Palestine described Deir Ibzia as: "a village of moderate size on a ridge, with a well to the west, and surrounded by olives".

In 1896 the population of Der bezei was estimated to be about 279 persons.

=== British Mandate era ===
In the 1922 census of Palestine, conducted by the British Mandate of Palestine authorities, the village, named Dair Ibzie, had a population of 262, all Muslim, increasing in the 1931 census to 360, still all Muslim, in 90 inhabited houses.

In the 1945 statistics, the population of Deir Ibzi was 410 Muslims, with 14,285 dunams (14.3 km^{2}; 5.5 sq mi) of land under their jurisdiction, according to an official land and population survey. Of this, 6,418 dunams were plantations and irrigable land, 2,670 were for cereals, while 51 dunams (5.1 ha; 12.6 acres) were built-up (urban) land.

=== Jordanian era ===
In the wake of the 1948 Arab–Israeli War, and after the 1949 Armistice Agreements, Deir Ibzi came under Jordanian rule.

The Jordanian census of 1961 found 542 inhabitants in Deir Ibzi.

=== 1967-present ===
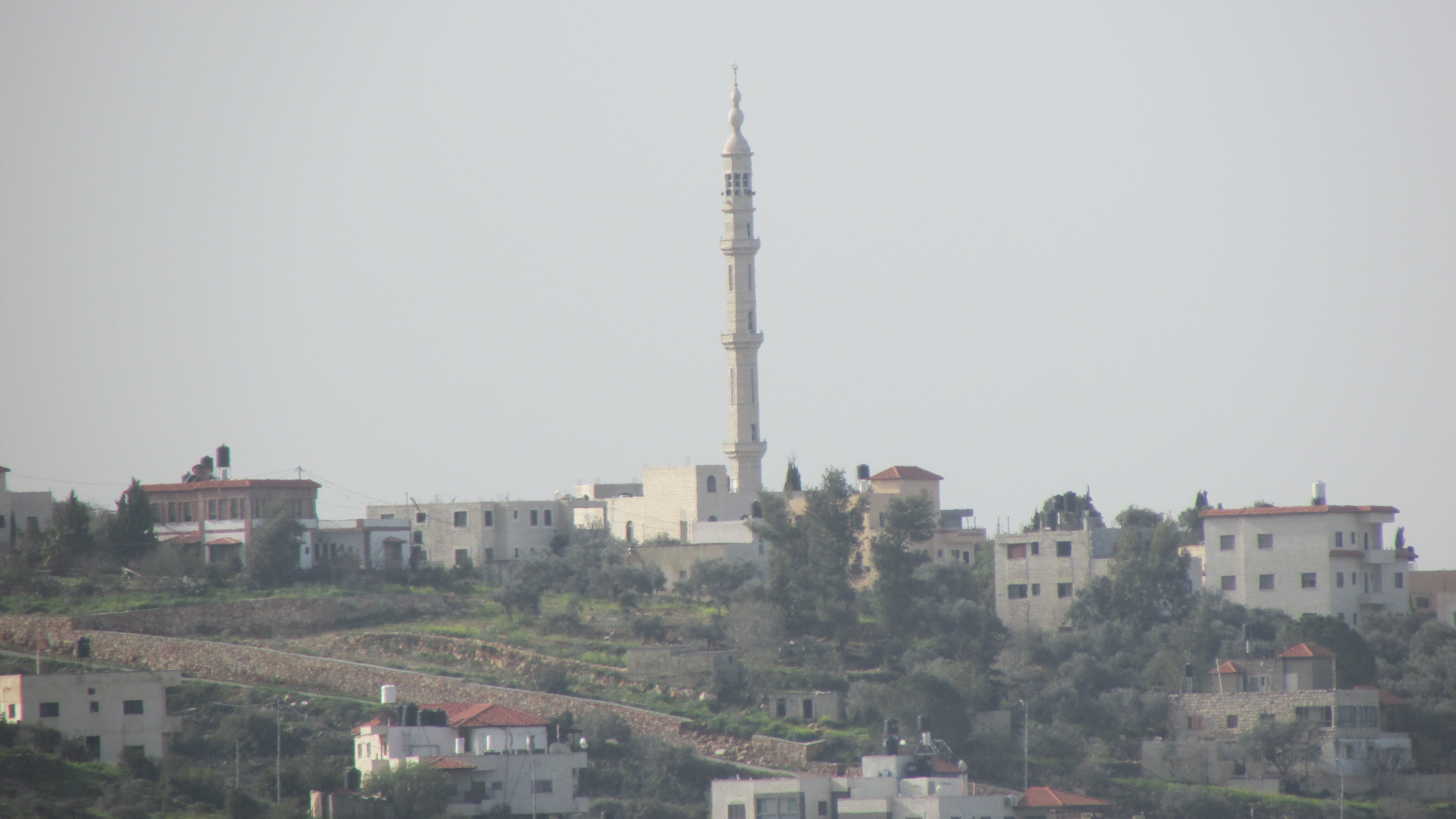
The mosque of Deir Ibzi

Since the Six-Day War in 1967, Deir Ibzi has been under Israeli occupation. The population in the 1967 census conducted by the Israeli authorities was 536, 34 of whom originated from the Israeli territory.

After the 1995 accords, 27% of village land was classified as Area B, the remaining 73% as Area C. Israel has confiscated land from Deir Ibzi for bypass roads, in addition to 22 dunams taken for the Israeli settlement of Dolev. This included spring Ein Bubin, now used by the Israeli settlers in Dolev for their own irrigation projects.

== Bibliography ==
- Barron, J.B., ed. (1923). Palestine: Report and General Abstracts of the Census of 1922. Government of Palestine.
- Conder, C.R.; Kitchener, H.H. (1882). The Survey of Western Palestine: Memoirs of the Topography, Orography, Hydrography, and Archaeology. Vol. 2. London: Committee of the Palestine Exploration Fund.
- Finkelstein, I.; Lederman, Zvi, eds. (1997). Highlands of many cultures. Tel Aviv: Institute of Archaeology of Tel Aviv University Publications Section. ISBN 965-440-007-3.
- Government of Jordan, Department of Statistics (1964). First Census of Population and Housing. Volume I: Final Tables; General Characteristics of the Population (PDF).
- Government of Palestine, Department of Statistics (1945). Village Statistics, April, 1945.
- Guérin, V. (1875). Description Géographique Historique et Archéologique de la Palestine (in French). Vol. 2: Samarie, pt. 2. Paris: L'Imprimerie Nationale.
- Hadawi, S. (1970). Village Statistics of 1945: A Classification of Land and Area ownership in Palestine. Palestine Liberation Organization Research Center.
- Hartmann, M. (1883). "Die Ortschaftenliste des Liwa Jerusalem in dem türkischen Staatskalender für Syrien auf das Jahr 1288 der Flucht (1871)". Zeitschrift des Deutschen Palästina-Vereins. 6: 102–149.
- Hütteroth, W.-D.; Abdulfattah, K. (1977). Historical Geography of Palestine, Transjordan and Southern Syria in the Late 16th Century. Erlanger Geographische Arbeiten, Sonderband 5. Erlangen, Germany: Vorstand der Fränkischen Geographischen Gesellschaft. ISBN 3-920405-41-2.
- Mills, E., ed. (1932). Census of Palestine 1931. Population of Villages, Towns and Administrative Areas. Jerusalem: Government of Palestine.
- Palmer, E.H. (1881). The Survey of Western Palestine: Arabic and English Name Lists Collected During the Survey by Lieutenants Conder and Kitchener, R. E. Transliterated and Explained by E.H. Palmer. Committee of the Palestine Exploration Fund.
- Robinson, E.; Smith, E. (1841). Biblical Researches in Palestine, Mount Sinai and Arabia Petraea: A Journal of Travels in the year 1838. Vol. 3. Boston: Crocker & Brewster.
- Schick, C. (1896). "Zur Einwohnerzahl des Bezirks Jerusalem". Zeitschrift des Deutschen Palästina-Vereins. 19: 120–127.
- Socin, A. (1879). "Alphabetisches Verzeichniss von Ortschaften des Paschalik Jerusalem". Zeitschrift des Deutschen Palästina-Vereins. 2: 135–163.
