= Timeline of the Israeli–Palestinian conflict in 2016 =

This is a Timeline of events related to the Israeli–Palestinian conflict during 2016.

== January ==
=== 1 January ===
- Two rockets fired from the Gaza Strip hit open ground in the Sha'ar Negev area.
- A Palestinian TV reporter, Anal al-Jadaa, was shot in the leg by a rubber bullet while covering clashes between villagers and Israeli troops at Kafr Qaddum.
- January 2016 Tel Aviv shooting: An Israeli Arab, Nashat Milhem (29) of Ar'ara, shot dead two Israeli Jews, Alon Bakal (26) and Shimon Ruimi (30), and wounded six others, two seriously, in a pub on Dizengoff Street, Tel Aviv. Milhem hailed a cab and killed its driver, Ayman Shaaban (42), a Bedouin from Lod, after being driven to the north of Tel Aviv. Milhem reportedly had a police record, and suffered from superpower delusions and personality disorders. On 10 January, two days after Milhem was killed in a shoot-out at a mosque in his home town, after relatives tipped off the Shin Bet about his presence in the area, police defined his actions as a terror attack.
- Mahmoud Kabaha, a Palestinian taxi driver from Barta'a on the Green Line was attacked and beaten by two armed settlers near Mevo Dotan and required hospital treatment. A partial video of the incident was released on 4 January.

=== 2 January ===
- In response to the previous day's rocket's fire, Israel launched four strikes against Hamas facilities: the al-Yarmouk training site in western Gaza City, the Falastin training site east of Beit Hanoun, the former Gaza International Airport near Rafah, and another area in the central Gaza Strip.

=== 3 January ===
- A Palestinian reportedly tried to stab an Israeli at a bus station on Barzani street in the Armon Hanatziv neighborhood of East Jerusalem. A youth who fled the area was later detained.
- Two Palestinian 12-year-olds, Shadi Farrah and Ahmad Zatari, were arraigned before the Jerusalem court and charged with attempted murder. They had been arrested on 30 December in possession of knives, and interrogated without the presence of either their parents or a lawyer.
- The home of Noura Sub Laban in the Oqbit al-Khalidiya area of the Old City of Jerusalem was damaged by Israeli settlers who had taken over the adjoining property some weeks earlier. Six breaches in the wall were made. The home has been in the sights of the Ateret Cohanim organization since 2010.
- A 19-year-old Israeli soldier was shot and sustained moderate wounds, while stationed outside the Cave of the Patriarchs in Hebron by a Palestinian gunman. Two suspects, who would also be linked to a shooting attack on 6 November 2015, were arrested some months later.
- An Israeli soldier suffered a light to moderate leg wound when a Palestinian gunman fired on an Israeli checkpoint south of Hebron.
- Two Palestinians were shot by Israeli forces in a search-and-arrest raid on the Duheisha Refugee Camp near Bethlehem.
- The home of Nihad Hanani in Beit Furik was attacked by settlers, believed to be from Itamar, before they were driven off. A Molotov cocktail was found at the scene.

=== 4 January ===
- Two Israelis were initially reported to have been wounded in a stabbing attack on an Israeli police officer near Jerusalem's light rail service. The Palestinian was shot and sustained moderate wounds. According to a spokesperson for the Hadassah hospital, no Israeli was stabbed, though a 15-year-old girl had a very light leg injury and a 29-year-old student hurt himself on falling on the ground.
- Eleven Palestinians were allegedly shot with live and rubber bullets by Israeli forces in clashes with mourners after the funeral of Ahmad Jamal Taha, shot dead after stabbing an Israeli to death on 27 November 2015. Seven were hit by live fire, and four with rubber bullets.

=== 5 January ===
- Ahmad Younis Kawazba (18) of the village of Sa'ir north of Hebron was shot after stabbing an Israeli soldier at a Gush Etzion checkpoint in the West Bank. The soldier was lightly wounded. Kawazba is the 6th person from Sa'ir to have died since the October 2015 surge in the Israeli-Palestine conflict.
- Unknown arsonists set fire to Jewish holy texts in a tent that served as a synagogue at an outpost next to the Karmei Tzur settlement in the West Bank. No one was at the site or injured but the books were badly damaged. Police said that the footprints of the suspects were found leading to a Palestinian village near the town of Halhul, the Ynet news site reported. According to Karmei Tzur residents, the suspected arsonists piled up the holy books and set them alight.

=== 6 January ===
- Israel Defense Minister Moshe Yaalon decided that Beit al-Baraka, a 3.8-hectare (9.3-acre) former Protestant missionary compound north of al-Arrub refugee camp, purchased by Irving Moskowitz through a shell Swedish company in 2012 was to be annexed to the Gush Etzion bloc of settlements in the West Bank.
- Five Bedouin families had their dwellings bulldozed in the E1 Corridor of the West Bank, leaving 25 members of familiers in the Abu Nuwwar community homeless.

=== 7 January ===
- Israeli forces confiscated a bulldozer rehabilitating land for agricultural purposes at al-Khirbeh near Aqraba and Majdal Bani Fadil. Israeli spokesmen were unaware of the incident.
- A two-story building, and a 125-square-metre apartment under construction, belonging to the family of Nadia Abu Diab in Silwan, East Jerusalem, were demolished by Israeli authorities for lacking a permit.
- Part of Imad Burqan's restaurant in Beit Safafa was bulldozed by Israeli authorities for lack of a permit.
- Three cousins, Ahmad Salim Abd al-Majid Kawazba (19), Alaa Abed Muhammad Kawazba (19), and Muhannad Ziyad Kawazba (18), from Sa'ir northeast of Hebron were shot dead when they tried to stab Israeli soldiers at the Gush Etzion Junction in the West Bank and were shot dead. No Israelis were injured.
- Khalil Muhammad al-Shalaldah (16) also of Sa'ir was shot dead after he approached Israeli forces at the Beit Einun junction northeast of Hebron armed with a knife. His brother Mahmoud al-Shalaldah had been wounded by Israeli troops near Sa'ir on 13 November 2015 and later died. A day afterwards, the Palestinian Authority denounced the killings of the Sa'ir youths as summary field executions done without any attempt at arresting the youths. Hamas called for a "day of rage" following the two incidents.

=== 8 January ===
- Palestinians hurled stones at a bus traveling north of Hebron, smashing a window and lightly injuring the driver in the eye from rock splinters.
- Ahmad Abu Hummus (12) was in a critical condition after suffering severe head and eye injuries in clashes with Israeli forces in Isawiya, East Jerusalem. A Palestinian spokesman claimed he was shot by Israeli police while standing on a street. This claim was rejected by the courts during an appeal as the evidence shows that Ahmad stood among the rioters and participated in the disturbances.
- Fourteen Palestinians were wounded in the legs by Israeli live fire inside the Gaza strip as clashes developed along the security barrier Another was shot by a rubber bullet,
- Six Palestinians were shot with rubber bullets during demonstrations on the West Bank.

=== 9 January ===
- Ali Abu Maryam (26) from the village of al-Jadida and Said Abu al-Wafa (38) of al-Zawiya, were shot dead at the al-Hamra military checkpoint, near the settlements of Beqaot and Ro'i, in the northern Jordan Valley of the West Bank. Israeli reports say the two tried to stab soldiers on guard. Palestinians present state that the two men, wholesale grocers en route to deliver goods to retail outlets, were told to get out of their car and then shot dead, and that knives were not visible to them. According to a detailed follow-up investigation by Gideon Levy and Alex Levac published in Haaretz, al-Wafa, reportedly a wealthy businessman running his family's import-retail business, was shot 11 times while still behind the wheel. The vehicle was parked at the proper place when approaching a checkpoint. His body was returned almost immediately to his family. Maryam was a management student at Al-Quds University, and worked as an agricultural labourer in the Israeli settlement of Beqaot. He was shot three times. The Israeli police are still investigating the incident.
- Maher Amer (60) was shot in the thigh with live ammunition while returning from a visit to relatives. The incident occurred as Israeli troops dispersed protesters in their weekly demonstration at Kafr Qaddum.

=== 10 January ===
- Israeli forces shot seven Palestinians south to Bethlehem, protesting the leveling and cementing of private Palestinian land at Tuqu' to prepare the ground for an Israeli military watchtower. Two youths, respectively 17 and 20 years old, were shot with live fire, the other five with rubber bullets.
- A Palestinian worker trying to cross over the Separation Wall, near the Israeli settlement of Oranit, was shot and wounded after fleeing, when called on to stop. He was one of 60 Palestinians without work permits intercepted in the evening.

=== 11 January ===
- Zayd Mahir al-Ashqar (18) from the Tulkarem village of Sayda was wounded in the abdomen by Israeli forces who shot him as he tried to stab an Israeli soldier on checkpoint duty near the Israeli settlement of Hermesh.
- A young Palestinian who threw stones towards Israeli vehicles near Hizma checkpoint has been shot and lightly wounded by IDF troops on site.
- Palestinians hurled rocks in East Jerusalem near the pilgrim road, lightly wounding three Israeli guards, all in their 30s.
- An Israeli man was lightly injured from rock throwing of vehicles in Highway 60 near Kfar Tapuach.

=== 12 January ===
- Srour Ahmad Abu Srour (21) from Aida Refugee Camp was shot dead at Beit Jala when Israeli forces raided that village and Beit Sahour after gunmen in a car fired at a container checkpoint northeast of Bethlehem. 6 members of a cell said to be aligned with Hamas, all from Bethlehem, - Muhammad Sami al-Hameed Al-Ezza (26), Muhammad Issa Mahmoud Al-Barbari (26), Muhammad Majdi Mustafa al-Ezza (21), Ahmed Muhammad Mahmoud Mashaikh (19), Ali Ahmed Muhammad Arouj (30), and Said Osama Issa Harmas (30)- said to be local and not externally directed, were arrested in late May for complicity in the incident.
- Muhammad Ahmad Khalil Kawazba (23) of Sa'ir was shot dead after he was rushed an IDF patrol armed with a knife at the Beit Einun junction north of Hebron.
- Adnan Hamid al-Mashni (17) from the village of Ash-Shuyukh was shot dead by IDF at Beit Einun junction. The army reports that the attacker arrived at the Beit Einun junction on Highway 60 with his car, exited the car and approached a patrol of Givati soldiers with a knife drawn. Palestinian sources reported that he was shot while driving near the junction and that Israeli sources claim Mashni had driven Kawazba to the site.

=== 13 January ===
- Mousa Zaiter (23) of Gaza, an Al-Aqsa Martyrs' Brigades member, was killed when an Israeli air strike struck a group of Palestinians inside the Gaza Strip during an incursion east of Beit Lahiya that aimed to level ground by bulldozing an area. Another three Palestinians were wounded. The reason given by Israeli spokesmen for the strike was that a group was identified as a "terrorist cell" intending to detonate an I.E.D at Israeli forces.
- The tent of a family of nine living at Khirbet a-Rahwa, south of ad-Dhahiriya and near to the Israeli settlement of Tene was bulldozed by Israeli forces, leaving all homeless.
- An Israeli Magav policemen was lightly wounded from a Molotov cocktail attack in Jerusalem.

=== 14 January ===
- Muayyad Awni Jabbarin (20) was shot dead by Israeli troops near the Beit Einun checkpoint after allegedly trying to stab soldiers,
- Haitham Mahmoud Abd al-Jalil (31) of Asira ash-Shamaliya, was shot dead after wounding an Israeli officer with a knife at a flying checkpoint set up outside his village. The soldier reportedly suffered a very light wound.
- An Israeli Magav policemen was lightly wounded from a Molotov cocktail thrown at IDF forces at Isawiya, Jerusalem.

=== 15 January ===
- Mohammed Abu Ziad (18) and Mohammed Majdi Abu Kita (26) were killed during clashes with Israeli troops east of the Bureij refugee camp in the center of the Gaza Strip and at least 10 other youths were wounded in varying degrees of severity. Israel's military said Palestinians rushed to the border and tried to damage the fence. Soldiers called on them to stop and fired warning shots in the air. When they persisted, troops fired "at rioters posing a threat of infiltration."
- An Israeli soldier was lightly wounded by rocks thrown during clashes with Palestinians near a security checkpoint in Beitunia, west to Ramallah. During the clashes, dozens of Palestinians burned tires and hurled rocks toward Israeli troops who responded with crowd-control weapons.
- Muhammad Abu Zayed (19) and Muhammad Majdi Qaita (26) of Khan Younis, were shot dead, the first in the head the latter in the stomach, hours apart in actions by Israeli troops during clashes near Bureij Refugee Camp inside the Gaza Strip. At least 10 other Palestinians from Gaza were said to have been wounded by live fire during the clashes. Israeli sources said the incidents occurred when groups tried to breach the border barrier.
- Clashes erupted in the West Bank. According to the Palestinian Red Crescent, five Palestinians were wounded by live and rubber bullets, and dozens suffered injuries from smoke and tear gas inhalation.

=== 17 January ===
- Wissam Marwan Qasrawa (21) from the village of Masliya south of Nablus was shot dead by Israeli troops after an alleged stabbing attack on soldiers.
- Dafna Meir (38) of the Israeli settlement of Otniel south of Hebron was stabbed to death, struck in the head from behind, by Palestinian assailant who then fled, allegedly in the direction of a nearby Palestinian town. A Palestinian teenager Morad Adais (15) of Yatta was later arrested as a suspect for the crime.

=== 18 January ===
- A 30-year-old Israeli woman in the Israeli settlement of Tekoa was stabbed by a Palestinian whom security guards then shot and seriously wounded.
- A garage belonging to Jamal Ahmad Darraj, and a room built on to a house owned by Hamdi Abu Khalil were destroyed in Kharbatha in the West Bank. A quarry in nearby Kharbatha al-Musbah, owned by Ahmad al-Habiba, was also reportedly damaged. The reason was that the owners lacked Israeli permits for recent work.

=== 20 January ===
- Israel announced it would expropriate 1,500 dunams (370 acres) of West Bank agricultural land, north of the Israeli settlement of Almog and close to the Palestinian city of Jericho, declaring them state lands. The expropriation is the largest since August 2014, when Israel seized 1,000 acres close to the Gush Etzion settlement bloc near Bethlehem. The putative legal basis for the move is an Ottoman law dating back to 1858 which allows land that has lain fallow to be seized by the governing power.
- The home of Hiba Abu Asab in Beit Hanina was demolished by Israeli bulldozers for lack of an Israeli permit. It is one of 6,000 Palestinian homes destroyed in the Jerusalem area since the 1967 occupation began.
- A 42-year-old Palestinian in the Gaza Strip was shot in the foot by Israeli border policed near the Karni crossing southeast of Gaza City.

=== 21 January ===
- The homes of Fawaz Qafisha, Shams al-Zatari, and Hussein al-Zatari on al-Sahla Street near the Ibrahimi Mosque/Cave of the Patriarchs in central Hebron were subject to attack by Israeli settlers. Rocks were thrown, several doors battered down, and tear-agas from Israeli soldiers nearby doused the homes.
- Palestinians threw a Molotov cocktail on a Magav force, wounding a policeman in Isawiya, Jerusalem.
- Three Bedouin homes, respectively, of Hamda Muhammad Odeh Abu Kutaiba, her son, Ali Abu Kutaiba, and Ghassan Jahalin, all mobile homes donated by the European Union, were bulldozed at Jabal al-Baba, near the village of al-Eizariya. Seventeen people evacuated by force were left homeless, half of them children. All their furniture and belongings inside were also destroyed. The Bedouin protested that the donated units could have been dismantled rather than destroyed. It is believed these demolitions are part of a plan to establish thousands of homes for Israeli settlers in the E1 corridor.
- An Israeli police officer, around 40 years old, was mildly wounded in his leg from a Molotov cocktail thrown on the road in Highway 1 in the East Jerusalem area of the West Bank, as police dispersed youths reportedly preparing to throw stones.
- During an arrest raid on the village of Tell near Nablus in the West Bank, in which 19 Palestinians were arrested, Hamed Ibrahim Awad Ramadan (21) was shot in the thigh with live ammunition, and Jihad al-Wahhabi was reportedly wounded in the lower abdomen with a 0.22-caliber "tutu" bullet.
- An Israeli bus driver was lightly wounded from rock throwing near the settlement of Beit El.

=== 22 January ===
- Fifteen Palestinians were wounded by Israeli live fire and another 2a also injured by bullets in clashes in the al-Faraheen area east of Khan Younis.
- A Palestinian was shot in the foot with live fire in clashes near the Nahal Oz checkpoint.
- At Kafr Qaddum, a nine year old child, Ayat Zahi, was wounded in the hand, reportedly while on the porch of her house. Another two Palestinians Hamza Khaldoun (21) and Abdullah Anwar (40) in the village also were shot by live fire in the same incident.
- Tamir Thiyab (20) lost an eye after being shot by a rubber bullet in clashes with Israeli troops in Qalqiliya.
- A 10-year-old child, Bashar Mustafa al-Khatib, was shot in the head by a rubber bullet in clashes with Israeli troops at Bil'in.
- Sharif Haneni suffered a gunshot wound from a rubber bullet to the leg when shot by Israeli troops in clashes in the village of Beit Furik
- A Palestinian youth was shot in the foot and then arrested in clashes with Israeli troops at the northern exit of Bethlehem. A second person was shot in the foot and hospitalized at Beit Jala.
- Muhammad Nabil Halabiya (17) of Abu Dis in East Jerusalem died when a pipe bomb in his possession blew up, while he was in the vicinity of an Israeli military site.

=== 23 January ===
- A teenage girl, Ruqayya Eid Abu Eid (13) of 'Anata, was shot dead after reportedly trying to stab a security guard at the gate of the Israeli settlement of Anatot. The incident occurred according to police sources after a family quarrel, which led her to abandon her home determined to die. Her father arrived too late to stop her, reportedly.

=== 24 January ===
- A car driven by a settler was struck by bullets near the West Bank settlement of Dolev. No one was injured.
- A rocket was fired from Gaza and struck open ground in the Sha'ar HaNegev area of southern Israel.

=== 25 January ===
- Israel launched two airstrikes in reprisal for the rocket attack, striking the al-Qassam Brigades' al-Muhararat training site near Deir al-Balah and a plot of ground south of Khan Younis.
- Two Israeli women were stabbed in the West Bank settlement of Beit Horon, west of Ramallah, by two Palestinians. Shlomit Krigman, aged 23, from Shadmot Mehola, was critically injured with stab wounds to her upper body, and later died; the elder woman (aged 58) was moderately injured. The assailants also left two bombs on the site. A security guard shot both dead as they fled the scene. They were identified as Ibrahim Osama Yousif Allan (23) from the village of Beit Ur al-Tahta and Hussein Muhammad Abu Ghush (17) from the Qalandiya refugee camp.

=== 27 January ===
- Ibrahim Ali Surri's house in the Jabel Mukaber neighborhood of East Jerusalem was bulldozed, reportedly for having been built without an Israeli permit.
- Kifaya al-Rashq's home in Shuafat was bulldozed apparently to clear ground for Route 21 and connect Jerusalem to the Israeli settlements of Pisgat Ze'ev, Ramat Shlomo and Neve Yaakov. The family of 19 were left homeless.
- Obada Aziz Abu Ras (18) from Bir Nabala was arrested on suspicion he was behind a stabbing attack that left a 35-year-old Israeli critically injured at a gas station near the West Bank settlement of Giv'at Ze'ev.

=== 29 January ===
- Seven Palestinian protesters were shot by live fire during clashes in the Strip, respectively, at Faraheen east of Khan Younis in the south and by the Beit Hanoun crossing to the north. One man was reportedly shot in the head. Warning shots were reportedly fired earlier.
- A farmer in Gaza was shot in the foot by live fire from Israeli border troops.
- Israeli troops confiscated a truck and excavator used in road repair from the village of Khirbet al-Dir. Residents claim military exercises in the area had ruined agricultural plots and roads in the area, which is adjacent to the Israeli settlement of Mehula in the northern Jordan Valley of the West Bank.

=== 30 January ===
- Gazan farmers and shepherds were driven from their fields when Israeli forces opened fire near Khan Younis.
- Two youths stabbed an ultra-Orthodox American-Israeli boy, who had made aliyah just over a month earlier, in the back on Sultan Suleiman Street next to Damascus Gate in Jerusalem. The victim suffered minor injuries. The 17-year-old Israeli was attacked while leaving the Western Wall after prayer on his way to a military prep school in Jerusalem. A Palestinian youth from East Jerusalem, aged 16, later turned himself in to the police.

=== 31 January ===
- Three Israeli soldiers were shot, respectively in the neck, abdomen and legs, by a Palestinian with a handgun after he was stopped at a checkpoint in the West Bank between Beitin, Silwan and Al-Bireh in the direction of Ramallah. The Palestinian, Amjad Jaser Sukkar (34) of Jamma'in, was a staff sergeant with the Palestinian Authority, and chauffeur for the Palestinian attorney general Ahmad Hanoun. He had announced his intention on Facebook. According to Edo Konrad, Sukkar's act reflected exasperation, as a Palestinian security official, carrying out policies that abet the occupation. Living was pointless "as long as the occupation oppresses our souls and kills our brothers and sisters."
- A Palestinian man was shot after allegedly engaging in an attempted car-ramming attack on route 443 near Ramallah in the West Bank.

== February ==
=== 1 February ===
- Four Bedouin makeshift homes of corrugated iron in the Ayub area between Ras Karkar and Deir 'Ammar were demolished by Israeli forces. Twenty-two people were left homeless.
- Ahmad Hassan Tuba (19) of the village of Kafr Jammal was shot dead after crossing or attempting to cross the Israel/West Bank Barrier near the Israeli settlement of Sal'it near Tulkarem. Israeli spokesmen say he was found hiding behind bushes by troops and shot after he pulled a knife. No soldiers were injured.

=== 2 February ===
- Israeli forces, during a raid on a mobile phone shop in the West Bank village of Qabalan, shot Yousif Shahrour in the foot and arrested him and two others, on suspicion they were linked to Hamas, and took them to detention in Ariel.
- A Palestinian boy (14) was in critrical condition after being shot in the abdomen by live fire, in clashes with Israeli forces. The latter shot him in clashes at the Jabal al-Tawil area of al-Bireh. An Israeli spokesperson said the 'main instigator' of a 'violent mob' was shot by them after an attempt was made to damage the security fence of the nearby Israeli settlement of Psagot.
- In the southern Hebron hill area of Masafer Yatta in the West Bank, Israeli forces demolished 23l Palestinian houses. Ahmad Issa Abu Iram's two room home in Janba was bulldozed, while solar panels used by the family were also confiscated. Two homes owned by respectively Issa Younis Abu Iram and his brother Jamil Younis Abu Iram, reportedly built with foreign aid after their dwellings had been destroyed last winter, were also razed. At the same time a number of other homes, consisting of corrugated iron and tents, were bulldozed in the Halawa and al-Tabban areas. Three thousand Israeli settlers live in the area. Palestinians were expelled from the area in the 1970s when it was declared a closed military zone, but were permitted to return after a long court case.
- The 200-square-metre home of IIyad Abu Mahamid, in Wadi Abu al-Hummus south of Sur Baher, was demolished for lack of an Israeli permit, on the day the family of seven planned to move in.
- The 220-square-metre home of Yahya Muhsin in the Wadi Qaddum neighborhood of Silwan in East Jerusalem was razed to the ground by bulldozers. Over 3,000 Palestinian homes have been destroyed in East Jerusalem since the 1970s.

=== 3 February ===
- A 400-square-metre car repair garage owned and run by Haitham Mustafa in Isawiya was bulldozed by Israeli forces for lacking an Israeli license. It was reportedly built on Palestinian land Israel plans to confiscate in order to lay out an Israeli national park.
- Hadar Cohen (19) of Or Yehuda, an Israeli Magav policewoman died from a bullet wound to the head. She with two other officers approached two Palestinians seated on a bench near the Damascus Gate, and asked for their identity papers. One of the men stood up and stabbed one of the women officers (20), seriously wounding her, and Cohen shot him dead. A second man pulled out a Carl Gustav rifle and starting shooting. A third Palestinian appeared and shot Cohen dead. Police in the area opened fire and killed all three. A third man was lightly injured. The three men were Ahmad Rajeh Ismail Zakarneh (20/21), Muhammad Ahmad Hilmi Kamil (20/21), and Najeh Ibrahim Abu al-Rub (20/21) from the village of Qabatiya. All three had previously been barred by the Shin Bet from entering Israel. Other munitions and explosives were reportedly found nearby. On 4 October 2017, two men from Najeh Ibrahim Abu al-Rub's hometown of Qabatiya carried out the Murder of Reuven Shmerling, a Jewish businessman, claiming that they acted to avenge Al-Rub's death.
- Two Hamas militants die after a tunnel they were digging from the Gaza Strip into Israel collapses.

=== 4 February ===
- In a raid on the West Bank village of Qabatiya from where the three assailants involved in the death of Hadar Cohen the day before, Israeli forces shot four youths with live ammunition, leaving one in critical condition with a bullet wound to the head. In addition, an Israeli jeep also ran over and critically injured Mujahed Zakarneh (15). The raid's purpose was to issue house demolition notifications to the families of the three Palestinians implicated in the Damascus Gate incident. The town of 20,000 was declared a closed Israeli military zone and all exits and entrances were sealed.
- Two Israeli Palestinians girls (13) from Ramla's al-Jawarish neighbourhood stabbed an Israeli security guard who asked for their identification papers. The guard (27) suffered light wounds to the hand and leg.
- Israeli forces razed five Palestinian tent homes and demolished five other structures in the village of Tammun in the West Bank's Jordan Valley because they lacked a permit.
- A bus carrying Israelis and security guards caught fire when struck by Molotov cocktails thrown in the Ras al-Amud area of the Silwan neighbourhood of East Jerusalem. No injuries were reported.

=== 5 February ===
- Haitham Ismail al-Baw (14) of Halhul was shot dead by Israeli troops while reportedly either preparing to or trying to throw a Molotov cocktail at passing vehicles on Route 60 in the West Bank. His cousin, Wajdi Yusif al-Baw (12) was also reportedly injured, handcuffed and taken away.
- A Palestinian was shot in the leg in clashes near the Border Fence at the Nahal Oz crossing east of Shuja'iyya in the Gaza Strip.
- A Palestinian was shot by Israeli live fire in the foot in border clashes near the Bureij Refugee Camp.
- Two participants in the weekly demonstration at Kafr Qaddum were reportedly shot and injured by Israeli live fire.

=== 6 February ===
- Jamal al-Shati, a member of the Palestinian Legislative Council, was reportedly shot in the stomach by a rubber bullet fired by Israeli forces dispersing an attempt to break the blockade of the village of Qabatiya.
- Shlomit Ganon (65) of Mishmar Hanegev was slightly stabbed by a Palestinian youth from Yatta, illegally resident in Israel. The incident occurred in Rahat.

=== 7 February ===
- Israel announced it was confiscating four homes in Sur Baher in East Jerusalem belonging to the families of the four teenagers indicted on a charge of causing the death of an Israeli driver by stone-throwing on 14 September 2015. The court has yet to issue a definitive ruling on their guilt. The order was to be executed on 10 February, and would deprive 23 people of their homes. The family protested the ordinance as an example of collective punishment. Israel claims the measure is intended as deterrence.
- Stabbing attack in Ashkelon—one IDF soldier wounded

=== 8 February ===
- Unknown vandals threw a Molotov cocktail on a house of a Jewish family in Abu Tor neighborhood in East Jerusalem. No one was injured but minor damage was made to the house's window.
- Stabbing attack in Ramle—one Israeli wounded

=== 9 February ===
- Israeli forces razed 11 Palestinian structures, 5 homes and 6 tents, in the village of Khirbet Tana, where 300 herders reside, near Nablus. The reason given was that it was an Israeli "firing zone" since the 1970s. Israel has defined 20% of the West Bank as "closed military areas", and this is the sixth demolition carried out at Khirbet Tana since 2006.
- A Palestinian girl (18) from East Jerusalem allegedly tried to stab an Israel security officer near the Damascus Gate. According to Israeli reports, she was stopped for acting suspiciously and during a search, reached into her bag, pulled out a knife and tried to stab the policeman. She was arrested without injury.
- An Israeli from the settlement of Neve Daniel suffered a moderate wound from a stabbing attack while jogging. He reported that the assailant fled in the direction of the Palestinian village of Nahalin. Israeli imposed a total blockade on the village, denying consignments of food and blocking 500 residents an exist to their workplaces in Bethlehem area schools.

=== 10 February ===
- A Palestinian youth, Omar Madi (16), was shot dead by Israeli troops during clashes in the Al Arroub Refugee Camp. An Israeli spokesman said soldiers had fired on a demonstrator in a group throwing stones at Israeli cars on Route 60.
- A Palestinian truck driving between the village of Azzun and the Israeli settlement of Karnei Shomron had its windshield smashed by an axe. A 40-year-old settler from Karnei Shomron was later arrested, after the driver laid a complaint, and implicated himself for having thrown the axe. From 2013 to 2014, only two indictments were made by the Israeli police in the West Bank from the 150 complaints registered by Palestinians.

=== 11 February ===
- Three youths from Beit Duqqu were shot in the lower limbs by Israeli forces raiding the village.
- Israeli forces raided the village of Beit Ur al-Tahta near Ramallah, imposed a closure that stopped children from going to school, restricting the movement of 6,000 people and proceeded to demolish several structures lacking Israeli permits. Sultan Ziad Suleiman's car-garage was bulldozed, together with the 4 cars inside it. A shed owned by Sheikh Thafer, and a well owned by Samih Atallah Hamdan Suleiman, were destroyed.
- Israeli forces bulldozed seven homes in al-Farisiya and Khallet al-Khader, leaving families homeless and demolished further 35 structures in the Bardala and Ein al-Baida communities, in the Tuba area of the Jordan Valley in the West Bank. The demolitions bring the number of homeless people displaced to 168, including 94 children, since the beginning of February.

=== 12 February ===
- Two Gaza Palestinians were injured by Israeli live fire, while a third sustained serious injuries when struck in the head by a tear-gas canister, in clashes with Israeli troops by Bureij Refugee Camp.
- At least one man was shot by live ammunition during clashes with Israeli troops east of Shuja'iyya.
- A child was seriously wounded after being struck by a rubber bullet fired by Israeli forces dispersing the weekly protests at Ni'lin. The child required surgery. Four other activists were injured.

=== 13 February ===
- Two Palestinians were shot, a third suffered bruising and 4 Israeli soldiers suffered light injuries near the al-Zayyim checkpoint. Two Palestinians were observed crossing the Separation Barrier and getting into a car, which sped away when approached and crashed into a military jeep, whereupon the soldiers opened fire. All 3 Palestinians were Israelis
- Kilzar al-Uweiwi (18) lightly wounded an Israeli soldier, and a Palestinian bystander who intervened to stop her, near the Cave of the Patriarchs in Hebron. She was shot three times and later died of her wounds. An autopsy suggested she might have been saved had she received medical attention in time to stop a massive haemorrhage in her chest.

=== 14 February ===
- Nihad Raed Muhammad Waqed (15) and Fuad Marwan Khalid Waqed (15) of the village of Araqah were shot dead by Israeli troops after they threw stones at cars, and attempted to cross the Separation Barrier. When border police arrived the youth started firing at them, and were killed by the response fire. A photo of a knife and a rifle were found nearby, according to Jerusalem Online.
- Naim Ahmad Yousif Safi from al-Ubeidiya, east of Bethlehem, was shot dead at the Mazmoria checkpoint near the Israeli settlement of Har Homa when he was observed to be carrying a knife. Israeli sources say he was running towards them.
- Yasmin Rashad al-Zarou (14) was critically wounded at military checkpoint 160 near the Ibrahimi Mosque/Cave of the Patriarchs when she was shot 6 times. Israeli sources allege she tried to stab them, but a border policeman managed to push her away before then shooting her. Palestinian reports state that she, accompanied by her sister, was walking away from the checkpoint when shot. A disabled Palestinian waiting near the checkpoint was flipped to the ground with his wheelchair following the incident, and a stun grenade was fired at bystanders running to assist him.
- Two Palestinians, Mansour Yasser Abdul-Aziz Shawamrah (20) and Omar Ahmad Omar (20) both from the West Bank village of al-Qubeiba were shot dead near the Damascus Gate. Shawamrah, an officer in the PA security forces was stopped while carrying a bag for a search and was shot when reportedly drawing a rifle and aiming it at Israeli troops, while the other was shot reportedly when firing from nearby. Explosives and a knife were found in the bag.
- Stones were hurled at a bus near Hizma junction north to Jerusalem. No one was injured but damage was made to the bus's front.
- Shooting attack near Hinanit
- Attempted stabbing attack near Jerusalem
- Shooting attack in Beit El

=== 15 February ===
- Israeli forces shot 28 Palestinians at the al-Amari refugee camp with live fire and rubber bullets during clashes in the West Bank near Ramallah, which broke out when a home was surrounded. It is unknown whether the raid was to plan the demolition of the house or search it.
- Israeli bulldozers under military escort demolished a number of Palestinian homes at Khirbet Om al-Rashash village, near Nablus. The structures, barns and homes of brick and corrugated iron, lacked the appropriate Israeli building permits.
- Attempted stabbing attack in Jerusalem

=== 16 February ===
- 100 seven-year-old olive trees in Wadi Qana, west of Deir Istiya in the West Bank were uprooted by Israeli forces on the grounds the area was an Israeli natural reserve.

=== 17 February ===
- In a sweep through the West Bank leading to the arrest of 15 Palestinians, locals in Halhul reported that in a raid on the home of Maher al-Hashlmoun, who is a prisoner of Israel, soldiers took away $3,843 from the house.
- The Israeli authorities bulldozed access roads and agricultural structures on 5 acres of land outside al-Isawiya village. Israel has earmarked the area as a future Israeli national part, that would absorb 175 acres of Palestinian land the al-Issawiya and al-Tur neighbourhoods.

=== 18 February ===
- A 21-year-old Israeli was killed and one Israeli aged 36 was moderately injured in a stabbing attack at the Rami Levi supermarket within the Sha'ar Binyamin Industrial Zone, a settlement in the West Bank. The perpetrators of the attack were Ayham Bassam Ibrahim Subih (14) and Omar Salim Rimawi (14) both from Beitunia. The two assailants were shot and critically wounded by a bystander.

=== 19 February ===
- Muhammad Abu Khalaf (20) from Kafr Aqab in East Jerusalem was shot dead after stabbing two Israeli border police near the Damascus Gate. They received light wounds. Al Jazeera reports he was shot some 50 times by five policemen after he had fallen to the ground from two shots. The shooting was caught on video.
- Abed Raed Abdullah Hamad, was shot dead by Israeli troops where he tried to ram his car into soldiers. No Israelis were injured. He had announced his death on Facebook some hours before the incident.
- One Palestinian was shot by live fire to the hand, another to the foot, in clashes at the northern edge of Bethlehem.
- Two Palestinian teenagers were shot by Israeli live fire in clashes at the Jalazone Refugee Camp.
- Three Palestinians were shot by Israeli live fire near Shuja'iyya in the central Gaza Strip, during clashes.
- Four Palestinians were shot, three 3 by Israeli live fire, in the northern Gaza Strip.
- Khaled Yousif Taqatqa (21) was shot dead by Israeli troops during clashes with local residents at Beit Fajjar in the West Bank.

=== 20 February ===
- Israeli troops drove off at gunpoint Muhammad Abd al-Hamid Sleibi and his family while they were pruning trees in their private plots near Beit Ummar. Sleibi said hje had a court decision permitting to work his fields, but soldiers told him only one member of his family was permitted on the terrain at any one time.

=== 21 February ===
- Stones were hurled at the Jerusalem Light Rail in Shuafat. No one was injured but damage was made to the train.
- Palestinians in a moving vehicle shot at an Israeli military post next the entrance of Beit El and fled the scene. No one was injured. Soldiers responded by firing and confirmed a hit on the vehicle.
- The only school catering to the children of the Bedouin community of Abu al-Nuwaar community near al-Eizariya in the West Bank was demolished by Israeli forces. residents said it was razed because building concrete structures in the area was forbidden.
- Qusay Diab Abu al-Rub (15) from the village of Qabatiya was shot dead by Israeli soldiers after reportedly trying to stab a soldier at the Beita checkpoint. Roughly 10 rounds were fired at him. No soldiers was injured,
- An assailant attempted to stab an IDF soldier, the stabber was shot and is in critical condition.
- A 14-year-old was arrested for allegedly trying to carry out a stabbing attack near Bani Na'im. No injuries were reported.

=== 22 February ===
- Israeli forces demolished the house of Muhammad al-Huroub in Deir Sammit overnight. al-Huroub had shot dead 2 Israelis in November 2014.
- Israeli forces demolished the house of Raed Muhammad Jabara al-Masalma in Dura overnight. al-Masalma had killed 2 Israelis in Tel Aviv in November 2014.
- Israeli forces shot a Palestinian in the Gaza Strip. He suffered a moderate wound in the foot.

=== 23 February ===
- Gaza fisherman reported damage to their boats after being fired on by Israeli naval forces off the Gaza coast.
- Mamdou Yousef Mahmoud Amro (27) a Dura school teacher allegedly attempted to stab Captain Eliav Gelman (30) at the Gush Etzion junction in the West Bank. He was wounded moderately while Gelman was killed by friendly fire.
- In a 69-page report the Israeli Human Rights groups HaMoked and B'Tselem published a study claiming to have documented what they consider to be systematic violations of rules forbidding torture and abuse set forth by Israel's High Court of Justice in 1999. The evidence was taken from interviews with and affidavits from 116 Palestinian prisoners detained in the Shikma Prison in Ashkelon.

=== 25 February ===
- A Palestinian attacked and critically wounded an Israeli security guard in a mall in the Israeli West Bank settlement of Ma'ale Adumim. Three days later, Saadi Ali Abu Hamid (21)from al-Eizariya in East Jerusalem was arrested on suspicion of being involved in the attack.
- Stones were hurled at an Egged bus in Jerusalem. No one was injured but damage was made to the bus' windowpane.
- Stones and a paint bottle were hurled at the light rail in Jerusalem. No one was injured but damage was made to the train. Security forces arrested one suspect.

=== 26 February ===
- Omar al-Nayif (52), a militant for the Popular Front for the Liberation of Palestine, who had escaped from an Israeli prison in 1990 where he was serving a life sentence for killing an Israeli settler in 1986, and had sought refuge in Bulgaria for decades, was found shot dead in the garden of the Palestinian embassy in Sofia. According to the PFLP, he was the victim of an Israeli targeted assassination.
- Dozens of Palestinian protesters throughout the West Bank were reported wounded or injured in clashes with Israeli troops during the weekly Friday demonstrations.

=== 27 February ===
- A 17-year-old ultra-orthodox Israeli teenager, who had made aliyah to Israel a month and a half earlier and who was returning from prayer at the Western Wall, suffered a light stab wounded while returning to his military prep school when attacked by a 16-year-old Palestinian, who turned himself in when alerted he was suspected of involvement, the following day.
- $255,552 worth of machinery for cutting iron from the Beit Ummar-based Ghazalah Building Materials company was seized by Israeli forces. The owner says he has documents attesting he purchased them in Tel Aviv. Israeli sources insist he must prove ownership.
- The village of Yasuf in the Salfit area was, according to villagers, attacked by settlers under army escort.
- Gaza fisherman claimed their boats were damaged when Israeli naval forces fired open fire on them,

=== 28 February ===
- A Palestinian from Gaza was shot by Israeli forces east of Khan Younis. His wound was described as light.
- Hisham Muhammad Atwan Sbeih and Yazan Omar Salah (16) were shot in the chest and critically injured by Israeli forces in the village of al-Khader, near Bethlehem. Sbeih, a middle-aged dentist, was said to have been shot while seated in his car.
- During a raid on the home of Tareq and Tahreer Darwish in Isawiya in East Jerusalem to detain their sons, Yousef (18) and Laith (17) on unknown charges, it is claimed that the whole family was injured, including the mother, daughter, Batoul (14) and Darwish (2). The mother and toddler were later released.
- An Israeli policewoman was lightly injured during riots in Isawiya in which Palestinians threw stones and Molotov cocktails at Border Police. Troops fired at the protesters, and a 19-year-old Isawiya resident was shot in the leg.

=== 29 February ===
- Two Oketz Unit (Special Forces) soldiers entered Qalandiya Refugee Camp through its central checkpoint, according to Israeli sources. Their presence was opposed by Palestinians in the camp, who threw stones and Molotov cocktails, setting their jeep on fire. A Hannibal Directive was implemented. The two were retrieved after a fire-fight. According to local informants, they had been held by gunmen for three hours until a helicopter evacuated them. Five Border policemen were wounded, one moderately. One Palestinian, Iyad Omar Sajadiyya (22), a journalism student at al-Quds University in Abu Dis, due to graduate this spring, was shot dead with a bullet to the head, while 12 were wounded, four by live Israeli fire, six by rubber bullets, and two from tear gas canister wounds According to Palestinian reports, the two were undercover agents who had entered the camp through an alley running by the camp's cemetery. According to Israel reports, they accidentally entered the area after being misled by a Waze navigation app

== March ==
=== 1 March ===
- The home of Yousif Abed Simrin, under construction in the Wadi Yasoul area of Silwan since September 2015, and lacking a permit, was razed to the ground by Israeli forces. Palestinians Muhammad Simrin, Ahmad Awad, Izz al-Din Simrin, and Khalid Shweiki were shot by rubber bullets during the incident.

=== 2 March ===
- An Israeli settler and reserve soldier, Roi Harel, from the settlement of Eli was reportedly attacked by two Palestinian teenagers, Labib Khaldoon Anwar Azzam (17) and Muhammad Hisham Ali Zaghlawan (17), from the village of Qaryut. Harel said that they carried clubs and axes, overcame him momentarily, and penetrated close to the children's bedroom of his house. He fought them off the premises and locked himself with his family inside his home. Soldiers shot both intruders dead as they fled. The settler has hospitalized with light cuts to his head.
- "Dozens" of structures in the hamlet of Khirbet Tana, which has 275 residents, and lies outside Beit Furik near Nablus were demolished by Israeli forces. Among the structures, including homes of tin, plastic, wood, and stone, destroyed was a foreign-donated set of mobile caravans serving as a primary school for 26 children.
- A three-story Palestinian building, each floor with two apartments, under construction at At Tur was bulldozed by Israeli forces.
- Two Israeli soldiers on patrol were stabbed, one lightly the other lightly/moderately, at the settlement of Har Bracha.

=== 3 March ===
- An Israeli policeman directing traffic near al-Auja, close to Jericho in the northern West Bank was lightly wounded in the shoulder in a stabbing attack. The assailant, Hadiyeh Ibrahim Ereinat (14), a girl from al-Auja, was chased and arrested shortly afterward.
- Gunmen fired on an Israeli police vehicle by the Rahelim Junction, near the West Bank settlement of Ariel.
- Settlers from Yitzhar, close to Nablus, during what Palestinian sources described as a raid on the village, hurled stones at Palestinian vehicles at the entrance to Asira al-Qibliya. Security forces pushed the settlers back to Yitzhar. On the way back they hurled stones at a vehicle and shattered its windshield. No injuries were reported.

=== 4 March ===
- A Palestinian woman driving her car hit an Israeli soldier stationed on the sidewalk of the Gush Etzion junction in the West Bank. The soldier sustained light injuries to the legs. The woman, Amani Husni Sabatin (34) of the village of Husan, was shot dead. A knife was reportedly found on the dashboard afterward.
- Israeli tear-gas canisters fired during clashes in northern Bethlehem smashed the windows of a Red Crescent ambulance sent to assist youths in the area, causing two paramedics, Ayman Dababseh and Fadi Jaafreh, to suffer from excessive tear gas inhalation. According to Palestinians, the ambulances were deliberately targeted.
- Khalid Murad Shtewei (12) suffered a live fire gun wound to his right leg, causing severe bone damage, during clashes with Israeli forces at Kafr Qaddum. According to Palestinian reports, a video of the incident shows Mashhour Jumaa (45) also being shot when he attempted to pick the boy up and carry him away.

=== 7 March ===
- A Palestinian from Gaza was shot in the leg during security operations east of al-Maghazi Refugee Camp.
- A 60-year-old tourist was lightly wounded in the head by stone-throwers on a roof who pelted her and a group of visitors at St Anne's Church, near Lion's Gate in Jerusalem.

=== 8 March ===
- Fadwa Ahmad Abu Teir (50) an Arab Israeli woman of Umm Tuba in East Jerusalem approached Israeli police stationed on Hagai Street in the Old city and reportedly attempted to stab them. She was shot once in the eye and twice in the abdomen, and died shortly thereafter. Palestinian sources say Israeli soldiers blocked medical care for ten minutes. Israeli sources say police who arrived at the scene administered first aid but soon thereafter pronounced her dead. The incident occurred in al-Wad street in Jerusalem's Old Quarter. The attacker was the niece of Hamas official Muhammad Abu Tir.
- Mahir Faris Abd al-Rahman Bani Fadil of Aqraba had his tractor confiscated by Israeli forces after plowing ground Palestinian sources claim was his own land.
- An ultra orthodox Israeli, Yonatan Ezriyahav (39) was lightly to moderately wounded in a store on Baron Hirsch Street by a Palestinian, Abd Al-Rahman Radad (17) from al-Zawiya village, who stabbed him in Petah Tikva. The attacker was wrestled with by a store owner and Ezriyahev who wrested the knife from him and stabbed him to death.
- Two Israeli police officers, one 47 the other 33 were shot by a Palestinian using a Carl Gustav rifle in Salah al-Din Street, East Jerusalem. Both were shot in the head, and the older officer was left in critical condition, while the other suffered a moderate wound to the neck. The assailant was shot dead.
- In the 2016 Tel Aviv stabbings, Taylor Force, an American who was part of a Vanderbilt University tour group was killed and 11 Israelis were wounded—three seriously, three moderately and a further six lightly—when a Palestinian, Bashar Masalha (22) from Hajjah in Qalqilya, ran amok in a stabbing spree in Jaffa. He then continued running in the direction of Tel Aviv, stabbing motorists as he went. One of the moderately wounded was a pregnant woman. Masalha was subsequently subdued and apparently shot dead as he lay prone by a volunteer policeman, as a crowd encouraged him to shoot Masalha in the head, according to a video of the incident posted on Youtube. It was the third attack within a number of hours on Tuesday evening.
- Amir Maimoni (29) of Zohar, a Shin Bet agent, was shot dead by friendly fire at the Gaza Border, after another agent mistook him for a Palestinian.

=== 9 March ===
- Two Palestinians from Kafr Aqab tried to run over policemen at a light rail stop ner the Damascus Gate in Jerusalem. They also shot at a man in a car. The man was a 57-year-old Palestinian from Beit Hanina who suffered serious chest injuries. The attackers then fled the scene. A blockade was set up and police began searching for the two men in their vehicle. The police found the men who pointed a makeshift Carl Gustav submachine gun at them. They then proceeded to shoot and kill the Palestinians.
- Ahmad Yousef Amer (16) from Mas-ha was shot dead, and another wounded when Israeli police fired on him when he approached them with a knife at an army checkpoint outside the blockaded Salfit village of Zawiya. Amer, in a last testament note, bid his parents goodbye, asked for forgiveness, and mentioned a 60 shekel debt he owed to school friends. According to a local official, Israeli soldiers also assaulted a vegetable vendor while in his truck nearby.
- A Palestinian woman entered the Israeli settlement of Kedumim near Hajjah and chased a woman. Security guards arrived, wrestled her to the ground and arrested her. She possessed a knife and is suspected of intending to attack the woman in her home. The woman was spotted by Dikla Gavish, whose husband Yeshuron Gavish lost both his parents, brother and grandfather in a Hamas attack on their home in the settlement of Elon Moreh 12 years earlier.
- Five Jewish youths violently attacked for several minutes Ahmed Badar (40) from Silwan, a Palestinian employed as a janitor by the Jerusalem municipality. The incident occurred in Jerusalem's Liberty Bell Park. While beating Badar, the youths yelled "Death to Arabs."

=== 11 March ===
- A 29/30-year-old Israeli Haredi man was lightly to moderately wounded after being stabbed by a Palestinian near Dung Gate, East Jerusalem. A suspect, a 19-year-old youth from Qabalan in the West Bank, was later arrested. Police say footage from CCTV cameras assisted them in tracking down the suspect.
- Two Israeli soldiers were wounded by a gunman who shot at them when a car was stopped at the Bel military checkpoint on Route 443 in the West Bank.
- At least 3 rockets fired from the Gaza strip landed on open ground in southern Israel near Sderot. No damage was reported.

=== 12 March ===
- Israel airstrikes struck 4 sites within the Gaza Strip reportedly identified as belonging to Hamas, in response to the rocket fire from the Strip.
- Yasin Abu Khussa (9/10) died in an Israeli airstrike on Beit Lahiya. Some hours later his sister Israa Abu Khussa (6) also expired after being critically wounded in the same incident. In a follow-up investigation, B'Tselem faulted Israel for omitting to report that the attack on the Hamas training base also affected the Abu Khussa's home some 50 metres away, a temporary shack they have been living in since Israel's Israel's Gaza offensive in 2014. It blamed Israel for the deaths, for refusing to alter its tactics to comply with international humanitarian law.

=== 13 March ===
- Adi Kamal Salamah ( 14) was shot in the chest by live ammunition during clashes with Israeli troops that had entered the village of al-Mazraa al-Gharbiya

=== 14 March ===
- Qasem Farid Jaber (31) and Ameer Fuad al-Junaidi (22) fired from a Peugeot 504 pick-up truck at Israelis on a bus-stop outside the settlement of Kiryat Arba and were shot dead. One Israeli soldier was wounded
- Shortly afterwards a car reportedly rammed an Israeli military vehicle in the same area, Hebron, injuring 3 Israeli soldiers. The driver, Yousif Walid Tarayra (alt. Yousef Walid Tra'ayra)(18) from Bani Naim, was shot dead by troops.

=== 15 March ===
- Nahid Fawzi Imteir (24) of Qalandiya refugee camp died of wounds from an incident on 1 March in which 1 Palestinian was killed and another 11 wounded, as IDF forces endeavoured to extract 2 of their soldiers from the camp.

=== 17 March ===
- A female Israeli soldier at a bus stop outside the Israeli settlement of Ariel suffered serious wounds to her upper body when she was attacked with a knife by two Palestinians, Ali Abd al-Rahman al-Kar Thawabta (20) and Ali Jamal Muhammad Taqatqa (19) from Beit Fajjar.

=== 18 March ===
- Mahmud Ahmad Abu Fanunah (21) from Hebron according to Israeli reports got out of his car and tried to stab Israeli soldiers near the Israeli settlement of Gush Etzion and was shot dead. Palestinian bystanders deny he was held anything in his hands.
  - Two Palestinian youths carrying knives stopped and arrested after they approached the perimeter of the Israeli settlement of Sha'ar Binyamin Industrial Zone, east of Ramallah. They dropped their knives when challenged.

=== 19 March ===
- A 20-year-old Israeli soldier suffered light head and facial wounds when a Abdullah Muhammad al-Ajlouni (18) after being stopped as a suspicious person and asked for his identity papers, pulled out a knife and stabbed the soldier at the Abu al-Rish checkpoint near the settlement of Kiryat Arba.
- Two Palestinians were wounded by Israeli live fire during clashes with Israeli forces in the village of Tuqu'.

=== 21 March ===
- Israeli forces demolished the foundations of a house in East Jerusalem's Jabel Mukaber neighbourhood, being built without an Israeli permit, belonging to Suhaib Jaabis, the brother of Israa Jaabis, who had carried out an attack on Israelis in October 2015 interpreted by Israeli officials, which she denies.
- A Palestinian youth was shot in the foot by a rubber bullet at Beit Rima near Ramallah.

=== 22 March ===
- In a raid by Israeli forces on the campus of Jenin's Arab American University, office property was damaged and computers confiscated.
- An Israeli raid on a charity run by the Palestinian authority caused an estimated $7,789 in damages to doors, windows, table, and for confiscated computers.
- A 14-year-old Palestinian student was shot in the foot by a rubber bullet fired by Israeli forces in al-Khader village, south of Bethlehem.
- Israeli forces bulldozed a house, a shed and an animal barn owned by Shaher Ahmad Issa in Khirbet Janba, in the Masafer Yatta area of the West Bank. A solar cell device was also confiscated.
- Israeli forces razed Nasser Khalil Abu Obeid's tin shack in Khirbet al-Tabban in the Masafer Yatta area.
- A Palestinian commercial store in Jabel Mukaber, East Jerusalem, was demolished by its owner Khader Obeidat, acting preemptively under Israeli orders. The owner demolished it to avoid paying municipal demolition costs.
- A 100 sq.metre mobile home structure used as a shelter by Majdi Idris, and his family was destroyed in Beit Hanina, East Jerusalem, since it was established without an Israeli permit.
- Imad al-Abbasi 's family home in the Ein al-Luza area of Silwan was demolished by its owners under Israeli orders to avoid paying municipal demolition costs.

=== 23 March ===
- Seventeen homes, 21 livestock pens, 5 outhouses and a small swimming pool in Khirbet Tana, east of Nablus were razed for lack of an Israeli permit. In addition, 4 old cars were confiscated for lack of an Israeli license. The village has 250 residents, shepherds and their families, unconnected to water or electricity, and has been subject to three demolitions in 2015, since it is not recognized by Israeli planning for the West Bank. 87 of the village's 250 residents, including 35 children, have since January been left homeless, some have retreated to living in nearby caves.

=== 24 March ===
- Ramzi Aziz al-Qasrawi (21), and Abed al-Fattah Yusri al-Sharif (21) were shot dead in the Tel Rumeida area of Hebron after stabbing a 20-year-old Israeli soldier, who suffered moderate wounds to his hand and shoulder. A Palestinian fieldworker for B'Tselem in Tel Rumeida, Imad Abu Shamsiya, filmed an Israeli soldier, some 11 minutes after the stabbing incident, killing off with a shot to the head one of the two assailants, al-Sharif, who lay wounded on the ground. The video was published by B'Tselem, and Shamsiya later reported that since the emergence of the video settlers had demonstrated outside his home shouting abuse leaving him in fear for his life. The United Nations Special Coordinator for the Middle East Peace Process Nickolay Mladenov condemned the killing of one assailant, for what appeared to be an extrajudicial killing. Amnesty International called for a prosecution as a possible war crime. The soldier, identified as Elor Azaria, a medic in the Shimshon Division, was arrested on suspicion of murder, and admitted he had fired the shot, stating variously that he shot the Palestinian because he needed to die, or did so because he felt his life was in danger. The IDF had ascertained minutes earlier that Sharif was not carrying explosives. The soldier later smiled and shook hands with the settler leader Baruch Marzel at the scene. The IDF later lowered the charge to manslaughter, and his indictment led to public outrage in Israel. Azaria was subsequently demoted, given an 18 months prison term and 1 year on probation, According to reports collected by the Israeli Human Rights NGO B'Tselem later, al-Qaraswi had also been shot in the head or neck by an Israeli soldier while he lay wounded from shots that hit him elsewhere in the body.

=== 25 March ===
- A 15-year-old Palestinian girl from Isawiya was disarmed and arrested after reportedly brandishing a knife at soldiers near a gas station at the French Hill neighbourhood.
- Taysir Shtewei (68) was shot in the head by a rubber bullet fired during clashes between Israeli forces and protesters at Kafr Qaddum. He was reportedly in his yard outside his home when wounded.
- In clashes with Israeli forces in Beit Furik, Mustafa Tahsin Abu Hayt (16) suffered moderate to serious injuries when he was run over by a military jeep, while Yusif Thaer Hanani (17) was wounded by a rubber bullet.
- Four young men from Gaza were shot by Israeli troops, 2 near Beit Hanoun, and 2 near the border east of Gaza City.

=== 26 March ===
- Islam Shoaib (22) was sustained a serious wound after being shot in the chest by a rubber bullet in the al-Naqqar area of Qalqiliya. Mohammed Majid Haj Hassan (19) was shot in the kneecap. An IDF spokesman said that Israeli forces fired warning shots at the two Palestinians as they were attempting to damage the Israeli separation wall in Qalqiliya, and fired shots at the lower extremities, confirming at least one hit.

=== 27 March ===
- Two Palestinians were shot with rubber bullets in an Israeli dawn raid on the Duheisha Refugee Camp in the West Bank.

=== 28 March ===
- Ibrahim Hasan Mahmoud al-Hireini (6) was hit by an Israeli settler's vehicle as he crossed a bypass road near the Palestinian village of Zif. He was hospitalized with moderate injuries.
- Two homes owned by Khader al-Jirashi near the 300 checkpoint in northern Bethlehem, together with a playground and a large barn, were bulldozed by Israeli forces. The owner said he had obtained a building permit from the Palestinian Authority. An Israelil spokesman stated it fell within the jurisdiction of the Jerusalem Municipality.

=== 29 March ===
- Israeli forces bulldozed a privately owned Palestinian playground, together with a storage room, poultry pen and fences which Khalid al-Zeir had built in al-Abbasiyya area of Silwan. The Israeli authorities claimed it had been constructed in an historically important archaeological area. Several trees belonging to the Simrin family, which had cleaned up the area several years ago when it had been used as a dump, were also cut down.

== April ==
=== 2 April ===
- Hatim Abu Mayyala (13) was shot in the back of the head by a rubber bullet while reportedly walking to school in the Ras al-Amoud area of Silwan. His father says he was then beaten by 6 policeman before an ambulance conveyed him to hospital.

=== 4 April ===
- Yazan Khalid Naaji (12) suffered serious injuries when shot in the head by an Israeli rubber bullet during classes at Isawiya.
- Three homes of Ahmad Zakarnah, Ahmad Abu al-Rub, and Muhammad Kameel from Qabatiya who had killed an Israeli policeman and wounded another in February were demolished. 5 local Palestinians were hospitalized after being shot with rubber bullets during clashes that erupted during the demolition work.
- Israeli forces demolished Azzam Mahmoud Gheimat's 170 sq.metre house in Surif, home to a family of 7.
- Jamal al-Taweel and Hisham al-Jabrawi's 2 homes at Khirbet al-Marajim near Duma were demolished.
- Abed al-Basit Abu Rmeila's home in Jabel Mukaber, East Jerusalem, home to a family of 7, was demolished.

=== 5 April ===
- Israeli forces damaged property, including a printer and artwork, in a night-time raid on al-Quds University in Abu Dis to seize what they termed Hamas propaganda.
- Israeli forces levelled the 200 m^{2} (2,200 sq ft) poultry slaughterhouse in Beit Sahour, the only one in the town, and was owned by the municipality. A balcony and well were also demolished, and a shipping container used as a home by its owner Issa Kheirwas confiscated. The balcony was demolished because Israel considers it as extending into Area C, whereas the house is in Area B. The 200-square-metre property belonged to the Beit Sahour municipality
- Muhammad Hassan (22) received a head wound from a rubber bullet during clashes when dozens of settlers reportedly attempted to raid the village of Duma. According to Palestinians, the assault was related to revenge for the arrest of several settlers suspected of involvement in the Duma arson attack.
- Shireen al-Sidawi tore extensions to his home in Beit Hanina made 3 years ago. He did so to avoid paying municipal costs, when Israeli forces moved it to demolish the additions.
- Israeli forces uprooted and burnt 47 olive saplings planted by local Palestinians to commemorate Land Day in the Ras al-Amud area of Silwan.

=== 6 April ===
- Israeli forces razed 6 tin shanties in Umm al-Khair near the Israeli settlement of Carmel in the West Bank, leaving 35 people homeless. Those affected were Adel Suleiman al-Hathalin, Khadra Suleiman al-Hathalin, Suleiman Eid al-Hathalin, Kheiri Suleiman al-Hathalin, Eid Suleiman al-Hathalin and Muatasim Suleiman al-Hathalin. An Israeli spokesman said they lacked building permits.
- A girl Duaa Diab Jaber (10 ) sustained severe fractures when hit by a car in Hebron. Local Palestinians allege the car was driven by an Israeli settler.
- Three Palestinian youths were injured by rubber bullets during clashes as Israeli troops escorted an estimated 1,000 Jews to a nighttime visit at Joseph's Tomb in Nablus. Molotov cocktails and stones were said to have been thrown by local youths.

=== 7 April ===
- A car paint shop owned by Khalid and Yassir Isteih, and employing 15 people, was demolished by Israeli forces in the village of Ni'lin.
- Israeli forces razed Issa Abed al-Ghani Srour's poultry slaughterhouse close to a military checkpoint in Ni'lin. 72 Palestinians were employed there.
- Israeli forces demolished Palestinian housing structures at Bir al Maskoub near Khan al-Ahmar, lying between the Israeli settlements of Ma'ale Adumim and Kfar Adumim.
- Further demolitions of shanties were undertaken by Israeli forces at demolitions were carried out Thursday in Khirbet Tana, on the grounds that it was a military firing zone. 20% of the West Bank has been declared a military firing zone since the 1970s.
- Israeli settlers under military escort levelled agricultural ground and uprooted trees near Deir Ghassana. The area is contiguous with the Israeli settlement of Beit Aryeh-Ofarim. Bani Zeid, according to ARIJ, has suffered losses of thousands of dunams due to settler encroachment over the years.
- Israeli forces demolished 54 structures in 9 villages in Area C of the West Bank, 18 of them created by funds from foreign donors, leaving 154 Palestinians homeless on a single day. A further 293 people, including 98 children were adversely affected by the demolitions.
- A 30-year-old Israeli man was lightly wounded by stones in Mount of Olives, East Jerusalem

=== 8 April ===
- An Israeli military bulldozer was damaged by a Palestinian IED when it ran over a mine in the southern Gaza Strip.
- Two Palestinians were wounded by rubber bullets during clashes with Israeli forces in Izbat al-Tabib in the Qalqiliya region. The incident occurred when Israeli forces intervened to stop Palestinians marching out to plant olive seedlings on land threatened by confiscation to settlements.
- Two Palestinians were shot in the legs with live fire inside the Gaza Strip near the Nahal Oz crossing as a protest near the border was suppressed.
- Three Palestinians were shot the Beit Hanoun crossing in northern Gaza Strip during protests at the border.

=== 11 April ===
- Amir al-Tarabin (13) was shot in the foot by Israeli soldiers stationed near Hujr al-Dik area in central Gaza Strip, reportedly while he was herding cattle.

=== 14 April ===
- Hajj Ghazi al-Ajouli's currency exchange office in Ramallah was damaged by fire when a raid by Israeli forces, involving the use of stun grenades and the detonation of charges to break open its safe, ignited the building. Israeli sources say they were searching for terrorist funds.
- Ibrahim Baradiya.(50) was shot dead just outside the entrance of Arroub Refugee Camp after allegedly trying to attack a soldier with an axe.

=== 15 April ===
- A Palestinian man was shot in the upper body by live fire, and another injured during clashes with Israeli forces involving stone throwing and attempts to damage the border fence, close to the Israel–Gaza barrier near Bureij refugee camp in the center of the Gaza Strip.
- Muhammad Nidhal Abu Ghazi (15) was run over by an Israeli jeep at during clashes in al-Arrub refugee camp.

=== 16 April ===
- A Palestinian member of a committee for prisoner rights Alaa al-Haddad was allegedly assaulted and beaten by Israel soldiers near Sur Bahir.

=== 18 April ===
- Eleven students at the al-Zahraa girls' school in the Tariq Ibn Ziad neighborhood of Hebron suffered from excessive tear gas inhalation after the school was dowsed with tear gas canisters. Several were hospitalized.
- Three Palestinian 13-year-olds were arrested after reportedly beating a Jewish minor in Jerusalem's Old Quarter.
- A bomb exploded in an Israeli bus in Moshe Baram Road in East Jerusalem's Talpiot neighborhood, injuring 21 people, with 2 seriously injured, and 6 suffering from burns and smoke inhalation. The bomb was set off by Abd al-Hamid Abu Srour (19), from Aida refugee camp, and Hamas claimed responsibility. The youth died in an Israeli hospital two days later.

=== 19 April ===
- A Palestinian fisherman was shot by Israeli naval forces, which then detained another three. The incident occurred off the coast of Rafah
- A Palestinian boy (15) from al-Ram was shot in the thigh by Israeli forces conducting a detention raid.

=== 20 April ===
- Stone-throwing, suspected by Palestinians, smashed the window of an Israeli ambulance answering an emergency call near Ramla. It was the third such incident in that area in the last 2 weeks.
- Two Israeli soldiers were wounded from an improvised explosive charge thrown at them during a riot after Israeli security forces began demolishing the house of Hussein Abu Gosh in Qalandia who stabbed Shlomit Kriegman to death on 25 January 2016. The security forces responded with crowd-control weapons until the demolishing was complete.
- Palestinians hurled molotov cocktails at firefighters while putting down a fire in Pisgat Ze'ev, East Jerusalem.

=== 21 April ===
- Palestinians were wounded by rubber bullets when Israeli forces conducted night raids in metal working shops the villages of al-Eizariya and Abu Dis.
- Human Rights Watch criticized the closing of roughly 35 Palestinian quarries, which yield an income of $25 million per annum, near the West Bank village of Beit Fajjar since late March, and the confiscation of industrial equipment used there. The shut down has paralyzed work in these sites, and, it is claimed, threatened the livelihoods of some 3,500 workers. Noting a change in practices, Israel, it claims, no longer returns confiscated equipment once fines are paid, as was the case in the past. The closure is viewed by the NGO as collective punishment imposed in response to knifing attacks on Israelis from residents of the village. Israel states they lack licenses, which Israel has not supplied since 1994.
- Alaa Ghaleb al-Rajabi (16) was hit head-on by a settler's car in Hebron and hospitalized in a moderate condition. The day before a settler had reportedly threatened to shoot a Palestinian family as they drove their car nearby Kiryat Arba-
- Palestinians fired at policemen and Magav forces stationed in Kalandia checkpoint. The forces responded by shooting toward to source of fire in Al-Ram neighborhood in East Jerusalem.

=== 22 April ===
- Palestinians hurled a cocktail molotov on a house in Gilo, East Jerusalem. When firefighters arrived to put down the fire more molotov cocktails were thrown at the crew and caused a fire in a nearby field. No one was injured.

=== 23 April ===
- Residents of the West Bank village of Jalud were notified by the army that the government had decided to confiscate 1,250 acres of their private land. Khallat al-Wusta, Shieb Khallat al-Wusta, and Abu al-Kasbar are the four villages to be affected by the measure.

=== 24 April ===
- Two Palestinians were shot in Silwan, after throwing an IED when Israeli soldiers raided the area.

=== 26 April ===
- Said Huwary, a cameraman for Reuters, and Hafez Abu Sabra, a reporter for Ro'ya TV, were injured while covering a Palestinian demonstration against the detention of journalist Omar Nazzal, who had been arrested earlier while in transit out of Israel to Jordan in order to attend a conference in Bosnia.

=== 27 April ===
- Maram Salih Hassan Abu Ismail (23) a pregnant mother of two children, and her brother Ibrahim Taha (15/16), both from Beit Surik, were shot dead by an Israeli guard. Israeli reports state they had refused to halt while approaching a checkpoint. The mother allegedly threw a knife at Israeli police, or had her hands in a purse. The boy had his hands behind his back. Palestinian reports say the woman was shot 12-15 times, and that her brother was shot as he approached his injured sister. They further stated that the two had taken a passage meant for vehicles, not pedestrians, and were walking the wrong way against traffic, that they hadn't understood Hebrew, and that the person who shot them was stationed 20 metres away behind stone blocks. They also alleged that after the initial shooting, an officer approached them to fire further shots at their bodies and that knives were then planted at the scene and photographed for distribution. Although photographs of knives were given, Israel did not release video from the site which is monitored by security cameras. It emerged some days later, that while an Israeli policeman had fired warning shots in the air, the killing was the work of a private security contractor employed by the Israeli police. The Justice Ministry dropped an enquiry since it is outside the remit of its police investigations unit. Israel security forces have suggested that in several such cases, the incident may be an example of people with personal problems seeking an opportunity to be shot by police by staging attacks.
- Two 14-year-old Palestinian girls were arrested, one after being shot after they allegedly attacked Israeli soldiers at a checkpoint in the village of Beit Ur al-Tahta.

=== 29 April ===
- Three Palestinians were injured in clashes with Israeli troops at the weekly demonstration at Kafr Qaddum against the blockade imposed on the village. Two were respectively wounded in the back and stomach by rubber bullets, and a third was burnt when a tear gas canister struck him in the hand.

=== 30 April ===
- Muhammad Qashqeesh from Halhul suffered a moderate wound to the foot when he approached the Separation Barrier near Dar Salah, just east of Bethlehem.

== May ==
=== 2 May ===
- In the morning a mortar shell was fired at an IDF engineering unit near the Gaza border fence. An IDF tank fired at a Hamas observation point in southern Gaza near Sufa Crossing.
- An Israeli man (60) suffered moderate wounds after being stabbed by a youth on al-Wad street in Jerusalemìs Old Quarter. An 18-year-old Palestinian youth was later detained on suspicion of involvement in the attack.

=== 3 May ===
- In the afternoon, a Palestinian sniper fired at an IDF engineering unit working near the Gaza border fence. Israeli soldiers also fired at Palestinian targets near Nahal Oz
- Ahmed Riyad Abd al-Aziz Shehada (36) from the Qalandiya Refugee Camp was shot dead after a suspected car-ramming attack at a junction near the Israeli settlement of Dolev. Palestinian eyewitnesses say Shehada's speeding truck hit 3 soldiers who were crossing a road, and fled, apparently in panic. He was pursued, the vehicle fired on, and, according to a witness, shot again after being pulled from the truck. One soldier suffered serious injuries, the other two were moderately injured. Shehada died, without medical treatment, from several gunshot wounds.

=== 4 May ===
Ra'ed Abu Rmeileh, former cameraman for the Israeli NGO B'Tselem was attacked by Israeli settlers close to the Ibrahimi Mosque in Hebron as he attempted to videotape settlers harassing Palestinian children. They punched him and hit him on the head with a sealed soda can until he collapsed. Two Israeli soldiers were present at the scene but did not intervene. One the settlers had disappeared, the soldiers assisted Abu Rmeileh who was taken to a hospital.

A young Palestinian, Arif Jaradat (23) reportedly suffering from Down syndrome, was shot in the back with live ammunition by Israeli forces during clashes with locals in the Ras al-Aroud area of the West Bank village of Sa'ir. He was shot from a distance of 10 metres after he drew attention to himself shouting ' No, my brother Mohammad!' He died of his wounds on 19 June. The official Israeli report states:' A clarification of the case reveals that the force spotted a Palestinian who was about to throw a Molotov cocktail and opened fire in order to remove the threat. Immediately afterward, the force began to move toward the wounded individual in order to give him medical treatment, but he was evacuated by Palestinian elements before the force reached the scene.'

During the day, five mortar shells are fired at IDF units working on both sides of the Gaza border fence trying to locate hidden tunnels. IDF tanks stationed close to Gaza returns fire at nearby Hamas positions.

During the night between 4 and 5 May, and in response to the five mortar attacks, Israel launched several airstrikes and used tank fire against what it identified as Hamas positions within the Gaza Strip. Authorities in Gaza say the mortars were fired to stop Israeli bulldozers leveling areas inside the strip.

=== 5 May ===
- In the afternoon, the Israeli Air Force conducted five strikes in the Gaza Strip. Hassan Hassanien (65) and 3 children in his family were injured in one of the strikes that struck a metal workshop in the al-Zaytoun neighborhood southeast of Gaza City.
- A Palestinian woman Zaina Attia al-Amour (54), was killed by Israeli shelling at the al-Fakhari area east of Khan Yunis in the Gaza Strip, reportedly while sitting at her farm.
- A man in the Gaza Strip, Khazima al-Farra (21) was wounded by an Israeli airstrike on the al-Rayyan area in eastern Rafah-

=== 6 May ===
- Israeli planes struck several Hamas sites for the third day. A mortar round from the Gaza Strip fell near some Israeli troops stationed near the Strip.
- At the weekly Kafr Qaddum demonstrations, Akif Jumaa (55) was wounded in the wrist by a sponge bullet, TV reporter Ahmad Shawir was shot in the foot by rubber bullets and photojournalist Muthanna al-Deek was also wounded in the foot.
- A Palestinian was shot during clashes with Israeli troops at the al-Mintar (Karni) crossing in the Gaza Strip.

=== 7 May ===
- In response to a projectile fired into Israeli territory, Israel made 2 airstrikes on targets in the Khan Yunis area.
- Gaza farmers were reportedly hindered from accessing their fields in the Strip when Israeli soldiers fired in their direction

=== 8 May ===
- Hebron settlers reportedly attacked two Palestinian human rights activists, Emad Abu Shamsiya and Yasser Abu Markhiya. The former was punched and had his video camera broken.
- A Palestinian worker from village of Salah Dar was shot and wounded in the leg while trying to scale the Separation barrier. He was the 9th member of the village to have been wounded in similar incidents over the past days.
- Seven Israeli soldiers were lightly hurt from smoke inhalation caused by a suspected arson in Ofrit base in Mount Scopus near Isawiyya in Jerusalem. An initial investigation of firefighters revealed the fire was caused by an arson. Ofrit base was arsoned several times in the past by Palestinian residents.

=== 9 May ===
- A 3 story building in the al-Sadiya neighborhood in occupied East Jerusalem's Old, with a view and court overlooking the Al-Aqsa mosque, and reportedly owned by the al-Yozbeshi family was taken over, during the owner's absence, by 40 settlers who prayed there.

=== 10 May ===
- Two Israeli women in their 80s hiking in a park near the east Jerusalem settlement of East Talpiyot were attacked by masked assailants. One suffered wounds to her back. Three male Palestinian teens from Jabel Mukaber were arrested for the assault on 19 May.
- A home, built without an Israeli permit in the village of al-Walaja in the West Bank was demolished by Israeli bulldozers.
- An Israeli officer was injured when a suspect object he was checking near Hizma, close to the settlement of Pisgat Ze'ev blew up.

=== 11 May ===
- Two Palestinian youths were injured in clashes with Israeli troops at Kafr Aqab. One was shot in the chest and the other in the leg.
- Three dunams of land reportedly in East Jerusalem's Sheikh Jarrah neighbourhood, owned by the Abu Taah and Siam families was taken over by members of the Israeli Amana settlers's organization. Amana intends to build its headquarters on the site.

=== 12 May ===
- A 16-year-old Palestinian was arrested after he hurled rocks at cars in Pisgat Ze'ev in East Jerusalem near Palestinian neighborhood Shuafat. One vehicle was damaged.

=== 13 May ===
- Ten Israelis were arrested for assaulting Palestinian residents near the Damascus Gate entrance, while reportedly calling for the destruction of the Al Aqsa mosque.
- Two Palestinians were wounded by sponge bullets during clashes with Israeli forces at Kafr Qaddum. A 26-year-old man was shot in the head, and an 18 year was wounded in the foot with live ammunition.
- A Palestinian Basim Yasim was lightly wounded when a tear gas canister fired by Israeli forces struck his hand during a demonstration at Bil'in.
- Three Palestinians in the Gaza Strip were wounded in clashes with Israeli forces. One was struck in the foot by live ammunition near al-Bureij refugee camp.

=== 14 May ===
- Settlers attacked the home of Riyad Abu Hazza in the Tel Rumeida quarter of Hebron, reportedly beating his wife and pepper-spraying his daughter.
- Suspected arson caused by Palestinians burned dozens of dunams of grass and shrubs near Ofrit base in Mount Scopus near Issawiya in East Jerusalem. Initial investigation of firefighters revealed the source of the fire was several arsons in the area. The place was arsoned in the past by Palestinian residents.

=== 16 May ===
- A Palestinian youth (20) from Abu Dis was arrested on suspicion of having stabbed a 30-year-old ultra-Orthodox yeshiva student on Haneviim Street near the Damascus Gate in Jerusalem. The Israeli suffered light injuries.
- Ninety Palestinian Bedouin, mostly children. were left homeless after Israeli forces entered the Jabal al-Baba neighborhood outside al-Eizariya, and dismantled their 8 mobile homes, which had been provided by a European Economic Community aid programme. The incident coincided with the celebration of Nakba Day.
- A Palestinian from Bethlehem, Ahmad Abu Omar (32), was shot in the head with an Israeli rubber bullet as he tried to scale the Separation barrier and go to work in Jerusalem.
- Two Israeli settler youth from Efrat, 19 and 22 years old, were arrested after a series of incidents in which they forced Palestinian vehicles off the road at gunpoint, and threatened to kill a driver. The pistols turned out, according to police, to be plastic guns.

=== 17 May ===
- An Israeli Border guard vehicle was struck by gunfire near Qalandiya checkpoint. No one was injured.
- Israeli forces demolished 2 homes, belonging respectively to the Tutanji and Ghanim families in al-Suwwana neighborhood contiguous to the Old City's eastern wall and the Mount of Olives. Twenty-three Palestinians were left homeless. Israeli authorities have designed their property for incorporation into an Israeli national park.
- Firefighters were attacked by Palestinian residents who hurled stones at them near Modi'in Illit while putting out a fire. As a result of the attack the firefighters fled the area without putting out the fire. No firefighter was wounded. A similar incident occurred a week before on the same area.

=== 18 May ===
- A Palestinian youth (18) was shot near the Karni border crossing in the Gaza Strip, allegedly for damaging with the Border fence. He was moderately wounded. Gazan farmers were shot at while endeavouring to work their fields in the Abu Reida zone east of Khuzaa.
- Israeli forces demolished the al-Hawarin family home in Shuafat, East Jerusalem, built in 2001 after their home in Beit Hanina had been razed that year. Palestinians say the demolition was undertaken to make a road connecting settlements in the area.

=== 20 May ===
- Two Palestinian youths were injured by Israeli tear-gas canisters fired in their direction. One suffered a neck wound, the other a minor foot wound. The incidents occurred during Israeli measures to disperse a crowd in the weekly Kafr Qaddum protest March
- A Palestinian was injured by Israeli live fire east of Al-Bureij refugee camp.

=== 21 May ===
- Israeli passengers reported that a gunman in a vehicle shot on an armored bus near Tuqu', causing damage to the windows. No one was injured.

=== 22 May ===
- Two undercover Israeli policemen beat up a Palestinian employee of a Tel Aviv supermarket. The victim was Maysam Abu Alqian (19) from the Bedouin Negev town of Hura. The youth was later hospitalized. When asked to identify himself, he had reportedly asked the agents to show their badges. Reinforcements were called and, according to his employer Kobi Cohen, he was then assaulted by 3 policemen, though he had stood with arms folded. Cohen added: "There's only reason for it: It's because the guy was Arab." Another eyewitness, Erez Krispin, reported that when en elderly woman queried the police during the incident, she was told to "Fuck off before we finish you too," The police allege that he cursed and attacked them.

=== 23 May ===
- A Palestinian girl, Sawsan Ali Dawud Mansur(17), was killed after allegedly rushing toward Israeli soldiers while wielding a knife. She was shot near the Ras Biddu checkpoint close by the Giv'on HaHadasha settlement in the West Bank. No one of the soldiers were injured.

=== 24 May ===
- Israeli settlers in Hebron broke into an uninhabited Palestinian house, owned by the Al-Sayyid Ahmad and Tahboub families, who are forbidden from accessing the homes after the area was sealed off. The settlers took out several items of furniture, reportedly to be used in a bonfire customarily lit to celebrate the festival of Lag BaOmer.
- Palestinians hurled a stone in the Jerusalem Light Rail in Shuafat, causing damage to one of the windows. No injuries were reported.

=== 25 May ===
- Two Israeli Border policemen were lightly injured when Molotov cocktails were thrown which set their vehicle alight near the "Ofrit" base, close to the Hebrew University on Mt. Scopus in East Jerusalem.
- The Ansar Bayt al-Maqdis group in Gaza launched 4 rockets, one of which hit an open area in the Sha'ar HaNegev Regional Council district in southern Israel. It was the 9th rocket to land in Israeli territory in 2016.

=== 26 May ===
- Israel mounted 2 airstrikes against sites used by the Izz al-Din al-Qassam Brigades, one in Rafah, the other the Shuhada al-Qassam area west of the al-Nuseirat refugee camp, holding Hamas responsible for the rocket that hit Israeli soil the day before.
- Molotov cocktails thought to be thrown by Palestinians caused a fire at Ofrit base on Mount Scopus near the Palestinian neighborhood of Isawiya.

=== 27 May ===
- Three Palestinians were injured in protests. One was shot in the hand and foot at Kafr Qaddum by rubber bullets. A 24-year-old was shot in the foot by live fire near the Karmi crossing in the Gaza Strip. Another Palestinian teenager, 14, was reportedly shot in the thigh with live Israeli fire at the Separation near Bethlehem.

=== 29 May ===
- Man lightly wounded from a stone hurled at a bus in Jerusalem.

=== 30 May ===
- 17-year-old Palestinian Omar al-Abbushi of Salfit, employed in a local Tel Avuv supermarket, lightly wounded a 19-year-old Israeli soldier with a screwdriver and was arrested while attempting to flee.

== June ==
=== 2 June ===
- Ansar Hussam Harasha (25), a mother of two, was shot dead by Israeli forces after reportedly trying to stab soldier at the Innab checkpoint east of Tulkarem, near Anabta. It is not clear how she attempted to stab the soldiers if they were inside the post's concrete guard towera at the time.

=== 3 June ===
- Israeli forces shot two Palestinian youths with live fire in their lower limbs during clashes overnight at Kafr Malik near Ramallah.

=== 4 June ===
- Israeli forces shot Jamal Muhammad Dweikat (20) of Nablus with live fire to the head, during clashes from after midnight to dawn as they escorted Jews to visit a site known as Joseph's Tomb, which local Muslims believe is the tomb of Sheikh Yousef Dweikat. A further 10 were reportedly injured. Dweikat succumbed to his wounds on 6 June.
- Wael Abdullah (16) was shot in the thigh with live ammunition when clashes broke out with Israeli forces at Kafr Qaddum

=== 5 June ===
- The Israeli driver of an empty bus for settlers was injured when the bus was hit by rocks near the West Bank village of Hizma.
- A passengerless Israeli bus for settlers was attacked with "steel balls" near Nablus in the West Bank. No one was injured but a window was broken.

=== 7 June ===
- Palestinian gunmen open fire on Israeli vehicles near the village of Deir Abu Mash'al and the Israeli settlement of Halamish in the West Bank. One vehicle was hit by the gunfire, but no injuries were reported. A settler shot back.
- Israeli bus driver was lightly wounded after assailants hurled rocks at a bus in Binyamin region north to Jerusalem in the West Bank.

=== 8 June ===
- June 2016 Tel Aviv shooting Two Palestinian cousins, Mohammad Mahmara(Makhamri), a scholarship student of engineering, and Khaled Mahmara (21) from Yatta mounted an attack on Israelis at the Max Brenner and Benedict restaurants in the Sarona Market area of Tel Aviv, killing four people and wounding 8 others. 14 others were treated for shock The 4 killed were Ilana Nave (40), a mother of 4; Ido Ben Ari (41) a manager for Coca-Cola from Ramat Gan; Michael Feige (58) a professor of sociology and anthropology at the Ben-Gurion University of the Negev and Mila Mishayev (32) of Ashkelon, who was waiting for her fiancé. 2 of those injured were in critical condition, 2 in moderate condition while 4 received light injuries. The incident, which Tel Aviv's mayor Ron Huldai linked to Israel's continued occupation of the Palestinian territories, took place in the first week of Ramadan. In response Israel rescinded 87,000 permits to Palestinians from both the West Bank and the Gaza Strip to visit family in Israel or attend prayers at the Temple Mount. It also froze 204 regular work permits for members of the shooters' extended family, A COGAT official added that their village of origin, Yatta, must undergo "a preventative root canal treatment that 'will go down in history', while Israeli Deputy Defense Minister rabbi Eli Ben-Dahan stated that life in Yatta will no longer "carry on as usual". One of the attackers, apparently in a state of shock, was offered shelter and a cup of water when mistaken for a fleeing bystander by an Israeli policeman's family, and only arrested in their home when the officer returned, having realized he was dressed like the other perpetrator.

=== 10 June ===
- Hasan Khalid al-Qadhi (22/26), from Awarta, was shot and seriously wounded near Nablus, according to Israeli sources, for attempting to stab Israeli soldiers on duty at a security post. Palestinian sources state he was riding a bike at the time and that the man suffers from mental disabilities and had been detained several times until his actual mental condition was determined. On the occasion, he is said to have panicked and pedaled away on seeing soldiers and being asked to stop. One of several bullets lodged close to his spine, leaving him incapable of walking.
- Palestinian security sources reported that an Israeli settler drove his car through a flock of Palestinian sheep, killing 25 near al-Zubeidat village in the West Bank district of Jericho.

=== 11 June ===
- A home belonging to the family of Mourad Badir Adais (18) of Beit Amra west of Yatta was demolished by Israeli forces during a night-time raid on the township. The demolition was a punitive measure taken in retaliation for the stabbing to death of Dafna Meir (39) in the settlement of Otniel on January 17. Mourad Adais has been indicted as culpable of the murder.

=== 12 June ===
- Overnight, 20 cars owned by Palestinians parked on Falafil street in Silwan were damaged by vandals. Palestinian sources attributed the damage to Israeli extremists.
- Two Israelis were injured when Palestinian youths threw rocks at an Israeli bus passing through East Jerusalem. Two young men suffered head injuries while a 61-year-old woman suffered chest pains requiring hospitalisation.
- An Israeli woman suffered light injuries near Kiryat Arba when her windscreen was hit by a rock thrown by Palestinians.

=== 13 June ===
- Two Palestinian security officers, Imad Salih and Majd Salih, were lightly to moderately injured when the vehicle they were driving was pelted by stones near the Israeli settlement of Yitzhar.

=== 16 June ===
- Two youths were wounded by live fire to the thighs, one critically, during an Israeli raid on the Aida Refugee Camp to rearrest two former prisoners.
- Four molotov cocktails were thrown at a house belonging to a Jewish family in Armon HaNatziv in East Jerusalem. One molotov hit one of the house's windows and caused minor damage and the other free set the house's garden on fire.
- Five vehicles belonging to Haitham al-Khatib, Laith Yassin, Abed al-Hamid Samara, Mujahed Birnat, and Muwaffaq al-Khatib, photojournalists, were impounded, as dozens of residents sreportedly suffered from severe tear-gas inhalation during an Israeli raid on the West Bank village of Bil'in-

=== 18 June ===
- A young Palestinian man (23) suffered medium injuries from shrapnel when Israeli ordnance left over from the Battle of Shuja'iyya exploded.

=== 19 June ===
- Four Palestinians were injured, and 13/26 were made homeless when Israeli forces demolished 2 housing structures in the West Bank village of Susya, together with an animal pen and an outdoor kitchen. The demolition took place during Ramadan, despite a written commitment not to enforce Israeli construction laws during this period, except in the case of security risks. Families affected include that of Khalil Salameh Nawajaah, who had his two room brick home razed. Injuries were sustained when activists and family members were forcibly removed from the homes. After the bulldozing, the Israel unit then moved to nearby al-Dirat where it demolished other habitations. Rabbis for Human Rights leader Arik Ascherman said it was the first time in two decades that he had witnessed Palestinian homes being demolished during the Ramadan period.

=== 21 June ===
- An Englishman, his Belgian wife and an Israeli woman were lightly injured on Route 443 in the West Bank, approximately between Modi'in and Beit Sira when their vehicle's windows were shattered by stones thrown by a group of Palestinians. Police believe oil was spilt on the road beforehand to maximize injuries. At least 10 vehicles were damaged by the stones thrown. The incident occurred at around 2 a.m.
- Israeli soldiers were dispatched to the scene. An officer from the Kfiur brigade driving an overpasso noticed a Palestinian vehicle on the parallel road and opened fire, believing it was driven by the rock-throwers. The vehicle, a taxi driven by Ehad Othman, contained five teenagers who were returning to their homes in Beit Ur al-Tahta from a swim in a pool in the nearby village of Beit Sira after the breaking of the Ramadan fast. Mahmoud Raafat Badran (15) was killed, while his two brothers, Amir (16) and Hadi (17), together with the other two passengers, their cousins, Dawood Issam Abu Hassan (16) and Majd Badran (16), the last on visit from Qatar, sustained serious wounds in the head and chest. According to Dawood Abu Hassan's testimony, an Israel man in black clothes stepped out of a Toyota, and began firing at them. The car crashed into the guardrails, and he and one other youth fled and hid under a bridge. The Qatar boys' parents were driving in a second vehicle just behind them and witnessed the incident. The driver, Othman was shot in the head, had his taxi confiscated, license revoked and had to pay his own medical expenses. Israel refused to accept responsibility. An Israeli journalistic investigation managed to get his driving rights restored. Two suspected stone-throwers were arrested,

=== 23 June ===
- A Jewish boy (17) was reportedly attacked by a group of Arab youths in a park in Jaffa, and suffered several wounds from a bottle used to stab him.
- People from as-Sawiya stated that some settlers from the Israeli settlement of Rachalim had set fire to dozens of dunams of their agricultural land near the Qabalan junction south of Nablus i

=== 24 June ===
- A Palestinian youth from the Duheisha Refugee Camp was shot in the leg by live Israeli fire during clashes that arose during a pre-dawn raid on the camp.
- Majd al-Khadour (18) of Bani Na'im was shot dead after apparently trying to ram Israeli settlers outside the settlement of Kiryat Arba. Two Israelis in their 50s were lightly injured.

=== 26 June ===
- According to the director of the Al-Aqsa compound, 12 Palestinians worshipers were injured by rubber-coated steel bullets during clashes with Israeli troops. Three suffered head wounds, the others were shot in the back and legs. Five were hospitalized.

=== 27 June ===
- Thirty-five Palestinians were hit by rubber-coated bullets in clashes with Israeli troops at Al-Aqsa.

=== 29 June ===
- Wadi Fukin village sources stated that settlers from Beitar Illit, one of several in what Israelis call the Etzion bloc, raided their agricultural properties in the al-Fuwwar area destroying 2 greenhouses and plants belonging to Maher Sukkar, Jamil Assaf, Muhammad Manasra, Muhammad Saleh Manasra and Naim Daoud Attiyeh. They then sprayed the slogan " death to Arabs" on the site in a suspected Price tag policy act. Locals commented that such raids from Beitar Illit are a commonplace.

=== 30 June ===
- Muhammad Nasser Tarayra, age 17 of Bani Naim infiltrated the fortified Harsanina neighbourhood of the Israeli settlement of Kiryat Arba and stabbed a Jewish girl, Hillel Yafa Ariel (13) of Kiryat Arba several times while she was asleep. Critically wounded, she was transported to hospital and later died of her wounds. According to some reports, he stabbed two other settlement guards before he was shot dead. A member of the volunteer security patrol, Shuki Gilboa, was shot and lost an eye when he entered the home and was attacked by the perpetrator, the shot was fired by the murdered girl's father, who fired 2 bullets, one hit the perpetrator as he was attacking Gilboa, the other hit Gilboa, who permanently lost one eye. Arrangements were made to demolish the attacker's family's home. His mother praised him as a 'hero' and shahid for in her view dying in defense of the Al Aqsa mosque. Israel locked down the township of Bani Naim, arrested the culprit's sister, Lara Nasser Tarayra (22) and his father, announced that the family home would be demolished and revoked 2,700 permits of residents to visit Israel. Israel leaders also proposed the deportation of his sister and mother from the West Bank.
- Wail Abu Saleh (46) from Tulkarem in the West Bank was shot dead by an armed civilian in the market of Netanya after stabbing 2 Israelis, an Orthodox man in his 40s and a 62-year-old woman. Another Palestinian, Mohammad Kabaha (30), an Israeli Arab from Jaffa was arrested later on suspicion of being an accomplice for having transported Saleh into Israel.

== July ==
=== 1 July ===
- A pregnant Palestinian woman, Sara al-Hajuj Atrayera (27), was shot dead when she allegedly pulled a knife and tried to stab an Israeli soldier at the Hasam Tzalbanit checkpost near the Cave of the Patriarchs/Ibrahimi Mosque in Hebron. Palestinian eyewitnesses report that the incident occurred when she was ordered into a room for a physical inspection, was pepper-sprayed, at which she ran away and was shot dead. She came originally from the same village Bani Na'im as Mohammed Taraireh, who killed an Israeli settler the day before, and of Majd al-Khadour, also shot dead some days earlier for an apparent car-ramming attack in Hebron. According to an investigation by the Israeli NGO B'Tselem based on the testimony of bystanders and video footage, a scuffle ensued during the inspection in a room, perhaps because a knife was found in her possession. Two Israeli officers, a man and a woman, left the room coughing from pepper-spray, which was also later found on the face of the deceased. The woman officer had a pepper-spray in her hand. A third officer left the room, and several others gathered at the door, after which 4 shots were heard being fired. They add that this was, in their view, another of dozens of extrajudicial killings of Palestinians, who could otherwise have been detained without lethal measures, in the past 3 months.
- In a drive-by shooting in the West Bank, a Palestinian gunman shot dead Rabbi Michael Mark (48), head of a yeshiva at the Israeli settlement of Otniel, and critically wounding his wife Chava (40). Two of their 10 children travelling with them, Pedayah (15) and Tehila (13), suffered light to moderate injuries. The attack took place on route 60 between Otniel and the settlement of Beit Hagai. A passing Palestinian couple, Ali Abu Shroukh of ad-Dhahiriya and his wife, both doctors, who were driving to the Al-Aqsa mosque for Friday prayers, stopped to intervene. A young Palestinian couple were already trying to help. The 2 medicos dragged the children and wife from the flipped-over vehicles and applied first aid. At the father's funeral, his children silenced mourners crying for revenge. In response, Transport Minister Israel Katz said the situation was one of 'all-out war'; Israel sealed off Hebron and its surrounding areas in a military closure in a measure that affects 700,000 Palestinians. Movement by the local population was subject to restrictions except for "humanitarian cases".
- Muhammad Mustafa Habash (63) from the Nablus area village of Asira al-Shamaliya died of excessive tear-gas inhalation fired by Israeli forces during clashes with Palestinians crossing the Qalandiya checkpoint to attend prayers at the Al-Aqsa Mosque in Jerusalem. He was one of a group of 40 who suffered from excessive tear-gas at the site.
- An Israeli policeman lightly injured from a stone thrown at him during riots in Kalandia. Israeli forces dispersed the protesters using crowd control weapons.
- Stones were hurled at the Jerusalem Light Rail in Shuafat area, causing no injuries but damage to the train. Two Palestinian suspects were caught by the police and brought to investigation.
- Palestinian militants in the Gaza Strip fired two rockets toward the Israeli city of Sderot. One rocket exploded in a community center for children which as empty at the time, piercing the roof of the building and causing damage inside. Windows of surrounding buildings were also damaged. There were no direct injuries from the rocket but two civilians were treated for shock. The second rocket hit an open field in the boundaries of Sha'ar HaNegev Regional Council. A Palestinian organization affiliated with ISIL, named Anqaf Bayt al Maqdis issued a statement claiming responsibility for the shooting. The Israeli air force struck what it called four "terror infrastructures" belonging to Hamas. An IDF spokesman said the IDF considers Hamas responsible for all that happens in the Gaza Strip.

=== 4 July ===
- Israeli forces demolished the houses of the Assaf and Abu Habsa families in Kalandia refugee camp in punishment for an attack by two of their members, Anaan Hamad (20) and Issa Asaf (19). The two had carried out an attack in Jaffa Gate last December, killing two Israelis. The forces used hammers instead of explosives due to the density of the camp. During the demolition which lasted for four hours, Palestinians rioted, throwing stones and also shooting at the soldiers, who responded with live fire. Four Palestinians were wounded, with light to moderate injuries, during the clashes. UNWRA spokesman Chris Gunness called the acts a breach of international law regarding collective punishment.
- Riots took place in Dura, West Bank after Israeli forces entered the village of Bani Naim and arrested four Palestinians, including two brothers of Mohammed Taraireh, the Palestinian teenager who killed a 13-year-old girl in the Israeli settlement of Kiryat Arba last week. A vehicle was also confiscated. During the raid the soldiers found and confiscated an M16 rifle, two pipe bombs and bottle of flammable paint.

=== 5–11 July Overview ===
50 Palestinians, of whom 14 were children, suffered injuries in clashes, mostly during 98 search and arrest operations by Israeli troops throughout the West Bank, leading to the arrest of 95 Palestinians. Gazans were fired on at least 7 times in incidents involving land and sea operations, and on 4 occasions Israel conducted bulldozing operations to level ground inside the Gaza Strip. One Palestinian was killed, and 3 reports of Israeli vehicles being stoned by Palestinians were registered.

=== 5 July ===
- An IDF combat soldier from the Givati brigade shot and critically wounded a Palestinian girl, Jamileh Daoud Hasan Jaber (17) from al-Zawiya, Salfit, after she tried to stab him and another officer, while they were on duty at a bus stop, the Gitai interchange, near the Israeli settlement of Ariel in the West Bank. A video of the incident is available, Israeli commentator Gideon Levy said the video shows her slowly taking 'hesitant steps' with a kitchen knife in her hand towards 2 armed soldiers, and asked General Gadi Eisenkot publicly whether the IDF supposed 'to make the death wish of every suicidal Palestinian girl come true?'
- An Israeli woman (30) was lightly injured in her face after her vehicle was caught in stone throwing north to Kiryat Arba on Highway 60.

=== 6 July ===
- Three soldiers were lightly injured when a car driven by a Palestinian hit their vehicle, causing it to flip over. The incident occurred near the entrance to the Israeli settlement of Neve Daniel. The Palestinian driver is in critical condition. Investigations have been undertaken to ascertain whether it was a deliberate attack or an accident.
- Israeli media reported that shots were fired at an Israeli settler's vehicle near the Zaatara checkpoint near Nablus in the West Bank. No injuries were reported.
- An Israeli settler was reportedly injured by rock-throwing in the vicinity of the settlement of Beit El.
- A Palestinian teenager from East Jerusalem was arrested for firebombing Hadassah Hospital on Mount Scopus. No one was injured in the attack.
- A stone was hurled at the Jerusalem Light Rail causing damage but no injuries.
- At least ten Palestinians were injured, some by live fire, in clashes with Israeli soldiers in the village of Dura after the soldiers attempted to arrest suspects in Hebron area. The IDF said troops used live fire from Ruger sniper rifles and crowd-control weapons to disperse the Palestinians who attacked the soldiers with stones, firebombs and burning tires.

=== 9 July ===
- Eitan Finkel of Netivot, was shot while driving home from the settlement of Metzad. The incident took place outside Tekoa. He suffered a wound to the shin. His wife and 6 children were in the car at the time. Israeli forces sealed off 2 Palestinian villages Sa'ir and Al-Arroub to search for a suspect. Clashes broke out and 8 people were arrested. Locals in Sa'ir reported that four Palestinians were wounded with rubber-coated steel bullets shot by Israeli soldiers and dozens more suffered from severe tear gas inhalation.
- A Palestinian man named Bassam Mahmoud Tabish was reportedly shot by Israeli soldiers while being arrested for no clear reason. The Israeli army did not confirm the incident.

=== 11 July ===
- Israeli forces shot 2 Palestinian youths with rubber-coated steel bullets during clashes that arose as they raided the al-Shuyukh area of the blockaded village of Sa'ir.
- It was reported that 10 dunams (2.5 acres) of land sin the Um Suwwana area under olive-tree cultivation and belonging to the al-Sawaada family of al-Ramadin had been torched by Israeli forces some weeks earlier.
- An improvised explosive device was thrown at the compound of Rachel's Tomb in Bethlehem, causing damage to a parking vehicle. In early July five Palestinian teens aged 16 and 17 of al-Aida refugee camp who admitted they were responsible for seven incident where they have thrown a total of 15 explosive devices on the compound during the month of Ramadan causing severe damage.

=== 12–18 July overview ===
44 Palestinians, including 13 children, were injured in clashes with Israeli troops over this period, 42 of which incidents occurred in the West Bank. A further 2 were shot in the Gaza Strip in the ARA or restricted area to which Gazans are denied access, one reportedly while out hunting birds. Twenty-three Palestinian properties were razed for lack of Israeli building permits, leaving 43 people, 25 of them children displaced. Nine attacks by settlers on Palestinians and their property were registered, including the burning of 150 olive trees in Bethlehem, the uprooting of 5 dunums of sorghum near the village of Huwwara, and the theft of over 50 sacks of hay and wheat grain in Qusra, attributed to settler actions. Six Palestinian vehicles were damaged by settler stone throwing; two Israelis were injured by Palestinians

=== 13 July ===
- Anwar al-Salaymeh (22/24) from Shuafat was shot dead and Fares Khader al-Rishq (20) was critically wounded when an Israeli Border policeman, feeling he was in danger, opened fire on their car, during a raid at 3:30 a.m. on the town of Al-Ram, to examine a blacksmith's business used as a weapons' manufacturing plant. According to Israeli spokesmen, the firing occurred when a vehicle headed in direction of troops was observed as accelerating. A third youth in the vehicle, Muhammad Nassar (20) was arrested. He was not wounded. Palestinian sources say the 3 youths may not have been aware a raid was being conducted inside the town. According to a Palestinian lawyer, a preliminary scan suggested al-Salaymeha had been shot in the back three times. An autopsy, with a Palestinian physician present, is to be undertaken to determine the exact cause of death.
- Israel conducted two airstrike raids on sites east of El Bureij Refugee Camp in the Gaza Strip, causing explosions. Israeli sources said the reason for what were called 'controlled detonations' could not be given.

=== 14 July ===
- Yihya Hijazi was lightly wounded when he was shot during a police arrest in Shuafat refugee camp. According to Israel reports border guards endeavoured to arrest a man suspected of "terrorist activities" at a checkpoint. Local residents tried to hinder the arrest and Hijazi is said to have approached the soldiers, reportedly holding a knife before he was shot. A Fatah spokesman claimed Hijazi had tried to wrest a knife from the suspect.
- 11 Palestinians were wounded during clashes between Israeli forces and stone and bottle-throwing protesters after an Israeli undercover squad and soldiers entered al-Mazraa al-Gharbiyeh, on the northern outskirts of Ramallah and arrested Tareq Rabie, an Islamic activist at Birzeit University. Nine were hit with live fire, eight in the limbs and one severely with a stomach wound. A military closure was then imposed on the village and the surrounding area. Israeli sources state that Molotov cocktails were thrown, while Palestinians report that they were empty bottles.
- According to Palestinian sources, a group of Palestinian vehicles were hit by a barrage of rocks thrown by settlers as they came back from a wedding, on the Wadi Qana road between Qalqilya and Salfit. A Salfit Company bus was damaged, and the windscreen of a driver from the village of Biddya was smashed. Palestinians convicted of stoning vehicles can receive sentences of up to 20 years, which Palestinians say is not applied to similar cases involving settler perpetrators.

=== 18 July ===
- The home in Qabatiya of Bilal Ahmed Abu Zeid, a Palestinian arrested on suspicion of providing arms used to kill an Israeli police officer and injure 2 others on 3 February, was demolished during a predawn raid. Five Palestinian youths were injured by live fire when clashes erupted at the scene. Abd al-Rahman Suleiman (20), was critically wounded by a shot to the chest; Rami Zakarneh (28) received a shoulder wound; Anwar Kamil ( 17) was shot in the leg, while Jawad Kamil (16) was hit in the waist. The identity of the 5th man wounded is unknown.
- Israeli soldiers fired on a Palestinian truck when it collided with an Israeli car near Hebron. The driver, Hisham Mahmoud Abu Ayyash of Beit Ummar was wounded and arrested. Palestinian sources stated that it seems to have been a traffic accident.
- 2 Israeli soldiers suffered light wounds from a screwdriver when they were attacked by a Palestinian, Mustafa Baradiya (51), a mathematics teacher from Surif, outside the al-Arrub refugee camp. The Palestinian was in turn shot in the abdomen. Both soldiers, one with a wound to the hand and the other to the neck, and the civilian attacker received first aid from a passing Red Crescent Society ambulance. It later emerged that the assailant's brother, Ibrahim Baradiya (50) had been shot dead at the same site after trying to attack a soldier with an axe on 14 April. Baradiya died of his injuries later that evening.
- Yahya Hijazi (24) was shot 9 times in the leg by Israeli troops in the Shuafat Refugee Camp. According to his mother, he was passing by and noticing a family quarrel, intervened and disarmed a man who was wielding a knife. She claims he raised his hand to signal to the troops he had no intention of using the knife, and thereupon was shot, and his other leg fractured in a subsequent beating. He was detained, but after interrogation, not placed under arrest.
- Hamza Mahmoud Rabaee (12) suffered a foot fracture and bruising in a hit-and-run accident involving, according to Palestinian claims, a car driven by an Israeli settler.

=== 19-25 July Overview ===
74 Palestinians, of whom 18 were children, were injured in clashes with Israeli troops in the West Bank. Farmers and fishermen from the Gaza Strip were fired on at least 10 times. On 4 separate occasions Israeli demolition teams razed 7 Palestinian structures in east Jerusalem. Armed settlers shot at Palestinians farming their land near the village of al-Khader and the Israeli settlement of El'azar, near Bethlehem.

=== 19 July ===
- A Gazan fisherman was wounded when the boat he was fishing from was subject to Israeli fire off the northwestern coast of the Gaza Strip.
- 7 structures in Silwan, East Jerusalem, were razed to the ground by Israeli forces. Arafat Abu al-Hamam had 4 of his buildings destroyed, a single-room home and 3 stores, built in 2008 without Israeli permits. A car-wash and garage owned by the Abu Tayih families were also demolished.
- A nearly completed home, owned by Sharhabil Alqam was also bulldozed in the Beit Hanina neighbourhood of East Jerusalem. The residence was intended for him his wife and 7 children. The owner had failed to file a request for a permit.
- A Palestinian demolished his own home in the Ein al-Louz area of Silwan to avoid paying for the costs of an impending demolition ordered by the Israeli authorities.
- Muhyi a-Din a-Tabakhi (10) of al-Ram succumbed to his wounds after being critically wounded in the chest by a black sponge bullet during clashes with Israeli Border Police, who fired at a group of stone-throwing youths, demonstrating against the construction of a Separation Barrier. A Palestinian bystander who tried to assist the boy was also shot in turn, and was wounded in his hand.
- Settlers were accused by Palestinians of setting fire to the home of Muhammad Dawabsha in Duma. An initial Israeli investigation claimed that the building was set alight following inter-clan tensions in the village.

=== 20 July ===
- A Gazan farmer was shot by a rubber-coated steel bullet while reportedly working land east of Deir al-Balah and close to the Israeli border.
- Two tin shacks owned by Abu Sneina and built close to the Atarot settlement in north Jerusalem, holding 4 storage containers and office space were demolished. The bulldozing also destroyed a 3 vehicles and a diesel tank. The land is considered public land by Israel.

=== 21 July ===
- An Israeli settler's vehicle was struck with live bullets on Thursday night near Beit Sahour in the occupied West Bank district of Bethlehem, according to Israeli sources. In response Israel blocked the entrances to the townships of Beit Sahour, Jannatah, Za'atara, al-Khas and Marah Rabah in southeastern Bethlehem.

=== 22 July ===
- Two Palestinian youths were injured in clashes with Israeli troops during the weekly protest march at Kafr Qaddum. One was shot in the thigh with a rubber-coated steel bullets, the other was struck in the head by a tear-gas canister. The marching area was also dowsed with skunk liquid, whose putrid smell lingers for some weeks.

=== 23 July ===
- Samir Jabir and his cousins were surveying some of their property, to which they claim they have Ottoman period title, when they were threatened and came under fire by Israelis from a settlement called Fathers' Road, near Bethlehem, between Neve Daniel and Elazar. When they refused to budge, the shots were fired just over their heads. The incident was filmed and posted on YouTube. According to a UN report settlers had injured Palestinians or damaged their properties on 9 occasions in the week between 12 and 18 July.

=== 24 July ===
- A Palestinian youth received a serious head wound from live fire during clashes with Israeli troops making a pre-dawn raid on the village of Silwad near Ramallah.

=== 25 July ===
- Israeli forces demolished 12 Palestinian homes in the West Bank village of Qalandiya for lacking building permits and because of their proximity to the Separation Barrier. Seven Palestinians were reportedly injured by either rubber-coated steel bullets, tear-gas inhalation, or physical assault as clashes broke out when locals tried to defend the homes.
- According to the Palestinian Red Crescent, 9 youths were injured by Israeli rubber-coated steel bullets, in clashes in Abu Dis, East Jerusalem, that erupted in the wake of a solidarity march by Palestinians for aprisoner engaged in a 43-day hunger strike.
- An Israeli Border policeman broke and confiscated a family bike ridden by Anwar Burqan (8) after she trespassed on a stretch of road in central Hebron reserved for Jewish settlers. It was the one source of play for several children of a local pauper family. The policeman concerned was suspended after B'Tselem placed a video of the event on its website on 2 August.

=== 26 July-1 August Overview ===
One Palestinian was killed, and a woman wounded, from alleged stabbing attacks at checkpoints, bringing the number of Palestinians killed in such incidents in 2016 to 60, and the number of Israelis 11; 67 Palestinians, of whom 14 were children, were injured in clashes with Israeli troops. On 7 occasions farmers and fishermen from the Gaza Strip were fired on. Israel razed 20 Palestinian structures in East Jerusalem, displacing 17 people, and affecting a further 221. Palestinians threw Molotov cocktails at Israeli cars in the West Bank on six occasions, while settlers injured one Palestinian driver by throwing bottles at his vehicle.

=== 26 July ===
- 4 structures, including a home being built by Salah Abd al-Nabi Mahmoud; Haitham Mustafa's car repair shop and 2 walls, were demolished in a predawn raid by Israeli forces on the East Jerusalem village of Isawiya. The reason given was that they lacked Israeli permits.
- A young Palestinian woman, Raghad Nasrallah Shuani (18), from the village of Kafr Aqab, was shot in the legs when, ignoring calls to stop, she ran towards soldiers manning the checkpoint in Qalandiya. She sustained a light wound. Later, a knife was found in her bag. It may be a case of attempted Suicide by cop.
- 3 Palestinian youths were injured by live fire when Israeli forces raided the al-Amari refugee camp in Ramallah district.

=== 27 July ===
- Muhammad Faqih of the village of Dura, considered the perpetrator of the drive-by murder of Rabbi Michael Mark on 1 July, was killed when the house he was hiding in, in the village of Surif, was struck by several anti-tank missiles reportedly after he returned fire. Five residents of the town were also injured by Israeli live fire as clashes erupted with Israeli troops. What remained of the house, owned by Muhammad Ali al-Heeh, was subsequently demolished by bulldozers.-
- At least one young Palestinian hurled rocks at a bus on Highway 55, in the northern West Bank. No one was injured but the bus was damaged. The stone thrower and another Palestinian suspected of involvement were arrested and placed under the charge of the Shin Bet.

=== 29 July ===
- Two Gazans suffered moderate wounds to their feet from Israeli live fire during confrontations near the Separation Barrier in the Gaza Strip.

=== 30 July ===
- Fawzi Abu Daqqah (21) was injured and hospitalized after being struck by a rubber-coated steel bullet in clashes that broke out during an Israeli raid on Jenin.

=== 31 July ===
- Rami Muhammad Zaim Awartani (31) was shot dead by Israeli forces at the Huwara checkpoint in the West Bank when he charged them, with a knife in his hand. Four Palestinians had been arrested at the same checkpoint the night before for being in possession of knives.

== August ==
=== 2–8 August overview ===
- On 14 separate occasions 42 Palestinian structures, 12 of which had been erected from humanitarian funding, were demolished by Israeli authorities for lacking building permits. Thirty were displaced, and a further 1,200 affected, 1,000 by the confiscating of water pipes serving 5 herding communities in the Jordan Valley. Sixty-five Palestinians, of whom 15 were children suffered injuries in clashes with Israeli troops. Farmers and fisherman were fired at with warning shots on 6 occasions in the area of the Gaza Strip. Two Israeli cars were stoned in Hizma and Halhul.

=== 2 August ===
- A Palestinian resident of the village of Dura, who was released in the Gilad Shalit prisoner exchange was arrested after he was involved in stone and molotov throwing at Israeli forces. He admitted that he was involved in such activity and that he broke his commitment not to participate in violent activity against Israelis after his release from jail.

=== 3 August ===
- The house of Izz al-Din Abu Nijma, was demolished in Beit Hanina, the 6th time in a decade during which he has sought an Israeli building permit.

=== 4 August ===
- Israel gunboats fired on Palestinian fishing vessels off the coast of Gaza, damaging beyond repair the motor of one boat owned by Muhammad Saif Abu Riyaleh.
- Locals from the Palestinian village of Rammun near the Israeli settlement of Rimonim in the West Bank reported that a group of eight masked men, suspected of being "Price tag policy" activists, attacked a herd of sheep/goats, and their shepherd, an 11-year-old Beduin girl from the al-Tayba community, stabbing eleven goats, killing from seven to eleven of them. The suspected Tag Mehir activists then set fire to a thorn field. Israeli police confirmed the suspicion that the incident was a suspected "Price Tag policy" act.
- Israeli forces demolished two houses belonging to the families of two cousins of the Muhamra family who perpetrated the shooting attack in Sarona which killed four Israeli civilians in June. Six children and 7 adults were left homeless as a result. Khalid Muhamra's home in Yatta was filled with explosives and was blown up, and at Muhammad Muhamra's home, an excavator was used to destroy the second floor, in accordance with the court's ruling.
- 2 mobile homes, offices and kitchens together with a bathroom, a barracks dwelling, and 3 water tanks all owned by Ali Suliman Mlehat were razed in the al-Moarajat area outside Jericho. Another residential structure belonging to Muhammad Ali Mlehat was also destroyed. This raised the number of Palestinian structures demolished by Israeli forces since the start of 2016 to 684 Palestinian structures.

=== 5 August ===
- 2 agricultural structures, reportedly built in 1954 and owned by Nasser Qabajeh in the Farsh al-Hawa sector west of Hebron. In addition a farm unit and its bathroom, recently built, were demolished.
- 6 Palestinians in the Gaza Strip were reportedly shot with live fire. One, 25, was said to have been critically wounded, while another sustained moderate wounds.

=== 7 August ===
- Several villagers in Beita and Burin were shot by rubber bullets during Israeli raids on the townships.
- Abd al-Fattah Buayrat (17) was shot and arrested together with a companion while according to Palestinian reports they were walking between the village of Silwad and the settlement of Ofra.

=== 8 August ===
- Abdullah Jamal was forced to demolish the 400-square-metre barn west of the village of Sebastia which he constructed without a permit in an area of the West Bank Israel had designated as a zone of archaeological importance. The structure was used for his cattle business.

=== 9–15 August overview ===
92 Palestinians, of whom 15 were children, were injured in clashes throughout the week. 32% from Israeli fire, live and otherwise, the rest mainly from tear gas inhalation.115 Palestinians were detained in Israeli West Bank search-and-arrest operations in the West Bank. 2 stabbing attempts were made, and one girl was arrested for carrying a knife. Israeli forces opened fire 15 times on Gazans in the restricted area, without injury.12Area C structures, some donated for people displaced by previous demolitions, were razed by Israeli forces, leaving 22 people, of whom 9 were children, displaced, while a further 120 were affected. Settlers and Palestinians clashed at the villages of Asira al Qibliya and Qusra, in the district of Nablus. 290 Palestinian olive trees in the villages of Iskaka and Khallet an Nahla, the destruction motivated by charges the land was Israeli state land.

=== 9 August ===
- A total of 8 Palestinian structures were demolished throughout the day, rendering 22 people homeless and impacting on another 88.
- A Palestinian girl was detained when she either rushed the Israeli Abu Rish checkpoint waving a knife, or took out a knife from her bag and threatened the soldiers stationed there during a security check, near the Cave of the Patriarchs/Ibrahimi Mosque in Hebron. She was pepper-sprayed and arrested. No soldier was injured.
- Palestinian media reported that seven Palestinians were injured during clashes in Dheisheh refugee camp in Bethlehem from Israeli forces who had arrested a PFLP-affiliated activist. Ma'an News Agency reported that the Palestinians were injured from live fire. IDF sources reported that the clashes erupted as soldiers en route to leaving the camp area, fired in order to prevent an escalation, using Ruger 10/22 rounds against the protesters reportedly hurling stones and pipe bombs in the troops' direction. The IDF did not confirm there were injuries among the Palestinians
- 2 established businesses, Nael Rizq Aqil's al-Qalaa restaurant and Tayser Aqils's booth selling antiquities, were bulldozed by Israeli forces in the West Bank village of Sebastia,
- 5 residential structures, home to 27 Palestinians, 18 of whom minor, and belonging to the al-Hathalin whose construction was funded by the EU in Umm al-Kheir were bulldozed by Israeli forces. An Israeli spokesmen said 4 were demolished, for lack of Israeli permits.
- A residential structure in Fasayil, Jericho district, was also demolished for lack of an Israeli permit.
- Unidentified people threw Molotov cocktails at a shed, damaging it, in the Israeli West Bank settlement of Yitzhar.

=== 10 August ===
- Moussa Muhammad Salman, an 85-year-old man from the village of Talfit in the district of Nablus, died after being run over by a motorbike, reportedly driven by an Israeli settler. In incident, which took place while, astride a donkey, he was herding his flock of sheep, occurred near Khirbet al-Marajim, west of Duma. He donkey was also killed.
- 4 Palestinian youths were wounded by Israeli live fire in al-Amari Refugee Camp. Clashes erupted during an Israeli raid, with Palestinians throwing rocks and burning tires, and Israeli troops firing to disperse what they called a riot.
- Settler bulldozers, accompanied by Israeli forces, and reportedly from the Israeli outpost illegal Israeli outpost of Nefih Hanania and the settlement of Rachelim razed approximately 500 olive trees extending over 8.6 acres in the al-Bayyada area of the West Bank village of Iskaka.

=== 11 August ===
- 2 Palestinians were shot in the feet with Israeli live fire during clashes when the latter raided the Aida Refugee Camp and met with groups throwing Molotov cocktails.
- A Palestinian attacked with a screwdriver an Israeli youth outside the Jewish cemetery on the Mount of Olives, near At-Tur in East Jerusalem, lightly wounding him in the neck and back. The assailant then fled. A Palestinian, Ahmad Naim(19) of At Tur, was arrested on 17 August on suspicion of involvement in the incident.

=== 13 August ===
- In a raid on a Palestinian charitable organization (zakat) in Bethlehem, Israeli forces confiscated 6 computers and files, containing the data bank for the poor and the orphans in the district. The office's doors were left smashed.
- A Palestinian (23) was shot in the leg by Israeli live fire after participating in a protest near the Bureij Refugee Camp and the border fence with Israel. An Israeli spokesman stated that warning shots had not been obeyed.

=== 14 August ===
- Amal Jamal Qabha (15), exited a car at an Israeli checkpoint near the Israeli settlement of Shaqed in the Jenin governorate of the West Bank, and attacked an Israeli border guardswoman, who received light injuries. The girl was arrested.

=== 15 August ===
- Israeli forces demolished the family home of Muhammad Nasser Tarayrah (17) in Bani Naim. Tarayrah had stabbed to death a Jewish teenager, Hallel Ariel (13), at her home in the settlement of Kiryat Arba.
- 5 Gazan fisherman engaged in finishing off Beit Lahiya in the Gaza Strip had their boat confiscated by Israeli naval forces.
- An Israeli soldier threw a sound bomb at a group of youths sitting outside of a house in Ramallah, after a passing military jeep stopped close to them. The incident was caught on video. No injuries were reported. 3 soldiers were later disciplined for the incident.

=== 16–22 August overview ===
88 Palestinians of whom 14 were children were shot and wounded in the West Bank, 52,32 by live fire, were injured in one incident that took place at Fawwar Refugee Camp. One youth was killed. 4 Palestinians, one 17 years old, were shot with live fire in the Gaza Strip, while work was interrupted in the ARA restricted zones by Israeli warning shots fired on several occasions. 28 Palestinian structures were demolished and 55 Palestinians displaced, and a further 800 affected in Area C and East Jerusalem. Water pipelines serving 41 Bedouin families were cut off in the area of Jerusalem. Israeli authorities also confiscated a water tank, a digger, an electricity generator and a welding machine from several villages, and razed 330 olive and grape vines, asserting the plantations were on Israeli state land in the West Bank. Palestinian stone-throwing damaged properties near Husan, Hizma, and Shuafat, injuring one settler.

=== 16 August ===
- During an Israeli raid on the al-Fawwar Refugee Camp, 3 Palestinian youths were wounded by live fire, while 32 were reportedly wounded by rubber-coated steel bullets during a search-and-arrest operation covering 150-200 homes. 28 homes were damaged, while 2 guns, stun grenades, and military equipment were found. One of three, Muhammad Abu Hashhash (19) later died, and it was revealed he had been shot in the back with live fire, above the heart. The Palestinians complained that the ambulance taking him to hospital was delayed by Israeli troops for 1 hour, making him the 218th Palestinian casualty since the uprising of October 2015. An investigation by the Israeli Human Rights NGO, B'Tselem concluded that Hashhash had thrown stones earlier that day, and then gone home, and that he was shot dead by an Israeli sniper positioned in the al-Hamuz family home 30 meters away, as Hashhash stepped outside of his house. Israeli regulations allow the use of the ammunition that killed him only in situations of mortal danger to the soldier. Of the other two, Muhammad al-'Amsi (22), according to B'Tselem, was shot 4 times, in the hand and both legs by live fire while listening to the radio on his cell phone as he stood on the roof of his home, some 80 meters away.
- Israel bulldozers destroyed approximately 50 olive trees in the Palestinian village of Shufa in the Tulkarem district. Dry-stone walls were also razed. One olive grove belonged to Abed Hamid, who stated the trees had been planted 15–20 years earlier, and that his appeal against the slated confiscation of his land was still pending. An Israel military spokesman replied that the trees were planted on Israeli state land, and had been planted without a permit.
- Muhammad Ali Ubeidat's single room 40 sq.metre structure, built for residency without Israeli permits, but used as a horse stall in the Jabal al-Mukabbir neighbourhood, East Jerusalem, was demolished by Israeli forces.
- Zakarya Moussa's car dealership in the village of 'Anata, together with 2 cars, was demolished by escorted bulldozers from the Beit El settlement.
- As a result of Israeli demolitions of 8 homes belonging to the Shalalda extended family at Jurat al-Kheil outside the village of Sa'ir, Hebron district, 50 Palestinians were left homeless. Israeli sources say that they had recent stopwork orders 2 years ago. The Palestinians state that they have repeatedly tried to obtain permissions but were denied their applications.
- 20 Palestinians of the Zreina family were displaced after Israeli forces demolished 2 houses and a room in the Beir Ouna area of Beit Jala near Bethlehem.

=== 17 August ===
- Israel bulldozers razed a one-room structure owned by Tariq Dirawi in Khirbet al-Marajim in the West Bank.
- Israel forces levelled an agricultural structure in the village of Qusra owned by Samir Hasan Several retaining walls in the area were also demolished.

=== 18 August ===
- Stones were hurled at the Jerusalem Light Rail in Beit Hanina neighborhood in East Jerusalem. No one was injured but damage was done to the light rail.

=== 19 August ===
- 3 Palestinian protesters were injured by rubber-coatred steel bullets at Kafr Qaddum and Bilin. According to a Palestinian spokesman, the village's water grid was also targeted, and put out of action for several hours. It is the seventh time the water supply has been singled out, he added.
- The Palestinian Prisoner Society alleged electric shocks had been applied to a detainee, Ahmad Yusry Maswada (16) of Hebron. Several other detainees complained of physical abuse during interrogations.

=== 21 August ===
- Mahmud Ali Walwayl (24) suffered live fire shrapnel injuries to his chest and arms in clashes with Israeli forces in the al-Fara Refugee Camp in Tubas district.
- A rocket fired from Gaza landed between houses in the Israeli city of Sderot, No damage or injuries were reported. Responsibility was claimed by both the Popular Front for the Liberation of Palestine and some Salafi Islamic militant groups.
- In retaliation for the rocket, the Israeli air force launched a missile against a Hamas base in Beit Hanoun, and a tank fired at what Israeli sources describe as terrorist infrastructure, including an unused water reservoir. Israeli sources claim one Palestinian was injured by shrapnel. Palestinian and UN sources stated 4 were injured, two civilians, and one boy.
- An Israeli spokesman, commenting on several follow-up missile attacks launched in the evening, said the rocket damaged Israel's sovereignty. Palestinian reports stated that a further 2 Gazans were injured in the later strikes.

=== 22 August ===
- Israel made 50 air strikes on Hamas targets in the Gaza Strip over 2 hours from late Sunday evening through to early Monday, reportedly in line with a new approach following Avigdor Liberman's assumption of the post of Defense Minister. The old policy responded to one rocket with one strike. Spokesmen said there was 'no intention to escalate the situation further'.
- In predawn raids Israeli forces entered several blacksmithing and lathe-operating locales in Bethlehem, Beit Jala, Hebron and al-Dawha and confiscated machinery, on the basis of a report that one such business in the area produced weapons. During clashes one youth at al-Azza refugee camp and Doha, one local youth sustained a live fire wound in his leg. Overall a further 5 youths were wounded by rubber-coated steel bullets. Some of the raids took place in Area A, which is exclusively under the control of the Palestinian Authority, and technically off–limits to Israeli forces.

=== 23 August–5 September overview ===
66 Palestinians suffered injuries in clashes, mostly during some of the 186 search-and-arrest raids conducted by Israeli forces for the period, which led to the arrest of 239 West Bank Palestinians. 5 Israeli soldiers were hurt by stone-throwing. Israeli troops opened fire on at least 18 occasions in the restricted zones of the Gaza Strip, wounding a herder and a fisherman. Some 28 Palestinian structures were subject to demolition or confiscation for lack of Israeli permits in Area C of the West Bank, or the Jerusalem area. 58 people were thereby displaced. 300 olive trees in Palestinian groves were extirpated in Jayyous and Ras Atiya. Settlers attacked a Palestinian in East Jerusalem and unleashed dogs that attacked a Palestinian near Deir Istiya. Orchards were damaged when sewage from the settlement of Betar Illit was reported discharged on the farmlands of Husan village. 4 Israeli vehicles were damaged from stone throwing, and 2 Israelis injured.

=== 24 August ===
- Sari Muhammad Abu Ghurab ( 24) from Qabatiya was shot dead by Israeli forces pursuing a car from which stones had reportedly been thrown, near the settlement of Ariel. According to Israeli reports, Abu Ghurab left the car, tried to stab a soldier in the neck, and was killed in response. The soldier suffered light injuries.
- Two homes belonging to Shuiab al-Hathalin, and the home of Suleiman al-Hathalin were demolished at the village of Umm al-Kheir. The former, a disabled elderly person, was subsequently put under arrest. A structure built as a cultural centre was also demolished.
- During several search-and-arrest raids throughout the West Bank, leading also to the detention of minors, as clashes erupted with Israeli troops in the Jenin Refugee Camp, Khalil al-Saadi (25) was shot in the loins with live ammunition and also wounded by two bullets to his leg.
- A 20-year-old Palestinian from Gaza was shot in the foot at the Eretz border crossing.
- Moshe Yanon Orin of the outpost of Givat Aroussi is suspected to have shot at a Palestinian taxi with 5 occupants near the settlement of Yitzhar, using an air-gun. The rear window of the vehicle was shattered but no one was injured.

=== 25 August ===
- Abd al-Aziz Saadallah, a Gazan fisherman was wounded by Israeli naval fire and subsequently arrested. An Israeli spokesman said they opened fire at vessels after warning shots failed to stop the fishermen from deviating into an area Israel designates as off–limits. The source also stated that shots had been fired from the shore at Israeli naval forces.

=== 26 August ===
- A Palestinian man, Iyad Hamad (38), was shot dead when he ran towards an Israeli guard post near Silwad and the Israeli settlement of Ofra. Initial reports stated he was an armed assailant, and had shot at soldiers from inside his car who shot him before he could get out. Witnesses at the scene, according to Ma'an News Agency said he was shot while inside the car. It emerged that Hamad, a father of three, was mentally ill and unarmed. Israeli forces had been alerted that someone intending to make a terror attack had gone missing from his home. They also said he had got lost going home after buying candy for his children, panicked at the sight of soldiers, attempted to run away and was shot in the back. Hamad is the 220th Palestinian killed since the uptick in the Israeli-Palestinian conflict that began in September 2015.
- 2 Palestinian youths in the al-Duheisha refugee camp were shot with live fire in the legs during clashes with Israeli forces, identified by the IDF as Israeli border police raiding the camp to arrest a suspect. 30 youths have received leg wounds since the beginning of 2016. Palestinian reports relate the injuries to alleged threats made by a Captain Nidal during interrogations of detained suspects, reportedly saying that he would disable all of the youths in the camp

=== 27 August ===
- An Israeli border guard was hit by a stone hurled at him during riots in Qatanna and suffered from a severe injury to his eye.

=== 29 August ===
- Stones were hurled at the Jerusalem Light Rail in Beit Hanina neighborhood in East Jerusalem. No one was injured but damage was done to the light rail.

=== 30 August ===
- Three Palestinian houses were demolished for lack of Israeli permits. Two owned by Iyad Nairoukh in Silwan still being built, and a third belonging to Wasim Atiyeh in Sur Baher, were involved. Wasim Atiyeh and his family, 5 persons, were left homeless.

=== 31 August ===
- According to Palestinians reports 6 youths were assaulted by Israeli police in the Bab al-Hitta area of the Old City of Jerusalem, while a further 5 Palestinian footballers were allegedly hit with rifle butts near Herod's Gate.
- Machinery for paving roads in the Wad al-Rakhim area of Susya was confiscated by the Israeli authorities, after, according to a village spokesman, they had strayed into an off–limits area. Israeli sources said the roads led to habitation deemed to be illegal.
- A soldier in an Israeli unit protecting a convoy of 16 buses to the tomb of Joseph near the Balata refugee camp was moderately wounded.
- 14 Palestinians, including 3 children, were left homeless after Israeli forces dismantled 3 caravans, toilets and shelters for livestock in the Badiw a-Mu'arrajat area near Jericho. The provisional infrastructure had been donated by foreign aid agencies, after families had their dwellings destroyed earlier in the month, on 4 August.
- 28 Palestinians, of whom 19 minors, were left homeless in the M'azi Jaba' area northeast of Jerusalem, after Israeli authorities bulldozed their 4 homes, together with 3 pens for their livestock.

== September ==
=== 1 September ===
- An Israeli was moderately wounded by gunfire when guarding Jewish worshippers who were performing religious rituals at Joseph's Tomb in Nablus. The army reported that the shots came from the nearby Balata refugee camp. The clashes erupted when sixteen buses carrying Jewish worshippers, escorted by forces of the IDF, Israeli Police, COGAT and Israeli Border Police arrived at the shrine and met with Palestinian rioters who hurled rocks, molotov cocktails and rolling burning tires at the visitors and soldiers.
- A Palestinian woman (21) from al-Eizariya was arrested after allegedly trying to stab Israeli guards at the Qalandiya checkpoint

=== 2 September ===
- Nidal Shtayyah, a Palerstinian photojournalist was wounded when struck in the back of the head by an Israeli tear-gas canister during clashes at a protest in Kafr Qaddum

=== 3 September ===
- Israeli sources stated that border positions were fired at from areas neasr Beit Lahiya in the Gaza Strip

=== 4 September ===
- Israeli artillery struck two Hamas sites in the northern Gaza Strip in retaliation.

=== 5 September ===
- According to initial Israeli reports a terrorist, Mustafa Nimr (27) reportedly driving in the direction of Israeli soldiers at speed and not slowing down in the Shuafat Refugee Camp, was shot dead, for appearing to be trying to run down Israeli soldiers who were raiding the camp. His brother-in- law, 'Ali Tayser Nimir (25) who was driving the vehicle also shot and with moderate wounds in the incident was arrested. Palestinian sources stated that Mustafa Nimr had been visiting his elder brother, and was bringing home food supplies and to buy Eid clothes, subsequently found in the back seat. Local eyewitnesses said the car was driving at normal speed, and crashed into a nearby car after being sprayed with gunfire. Israeli intelligence sources later admitted the shooting had been a mistake, and retracted the claim he was a terrorist. The wounded man was kept in detention on a charge of driving without a license, for driving under the influence of alcohol and for 'reckless endangerment with a vehicle'. One journalist counted 30 bullet holes in the vehicle. It was further claimed that two cars were racing at the time of the incident, and that the driver of the vehicle in question did not know a raid was being conducted. In a video released later 2 shots can be heard being fired after the wounded driver, Ali Nimr, emerged from the vehicle. Mustafa Nimr lived with his Jewish girlfriend in Ramat Gan. A woman in the vehicle, variously reported as his girlfriend or his sister's husband, who was with Mustafa in the back seat, was not injured in the shooting. In a follow up, Ali Nimr was also charged with causing the death of his brother-in-law by negligent driving. An Israeli court turned down the police allegation Ali's driving made him culpable of manslaughter.
- Abd Shaqir of al-Zawiya had his claim to 12.3 acres of land confiscated in the past by Israeli authorities recognized by the Israeli Supreme Court after a 12-year legal battle. In 2004, 78.3 acres had been confiscated from the village to construct the West Bank Separation Barrier.
- Abd al-Ghani Bahlaq (21) and Nimr Abu Ghazala (20) were both shot in the legs during clashes with Israeli forces in Sebastia.

=== 6 September-19 September overview ===
Over 4 days, from 16 to 19 September, 7 lone wolf attacks and alleged attacks were carried out. 6 of the suspected assailants were shot dead, 3 were injured while 5 Israeli security personnel and 3 settlers were injured. 2 Palestinians were shot dead and 98 Palestinians, of whom 37 children, were injured from live and rubber bullets or tear gas inhalation in clashes with Israeli troops. Gazans were fired on 29 times for entering the Restricted Access Zone in or along the Gaza Strip. 183 Palestinians were detained by Israeli search-and-arrest raids in the West Bank. Israeli authorities demolished or had the owners forcibly demolish 15 Palestinian-owned structures in Area C and East Jerusalem on the grounds that they lacked Israeli building permits, resulting in 23 people, among them 12 children, being displaced.2 Israeli vehicles were damaged, and their 4 occupants injured, from 6 Palestinian stone-throwing incidents. Settlers reportedly burnt 45 olive trees in the West Bank villages of Jinsafut and Burin, while uncultivated village land in the latter hamlet was bulldozed by settlers under armed IDSF guard.

=== 6 September ===
- Several militant sites, including a watchtower, and training areas in the Gaza Strip were shelled with Israeli artillery fire. The home of the al-Shanti family in Beit Lahiya was damaged collaterally. Israeli sourcesd say the action was in response to gunfire at border defenses overnight.

=== 7 September ===
- Israeli forces razed over 40 dunums of agricultural lands in Beit Ula, uprooting some 800 olive trees. The properties affected are those of Bassam Hamdan al-Adam, Suliman Mahmoud al-Adam, Ali Mohammad al-Adam and Mahmoud Khaled al-Adam. In addition two private wells were despoiled. The action came in the wake of a military order declaring the land state property. The owners say they were not notified.

=== 8 September ===
- An elderly Palestinian (65) from the village of Al-Khader was run over by a settler car. The man suffered bruising and bone fractures. Palestinians claim the incident was deliberate.
- Palestinian sources claim Israeli forces shot a Palestinian youth (18) in the city of Jabaliya in the northern Gaza Strip.
- A Palestinian youth was wounded in the back and hand by Israeli live fire at Jalazone refugee camp. Palestinian sources say the incident occurred as students were leaving their school in the camp.

=== 9 September ===
- A Palestinian youth, Abd al-Rahman Ahmad al-Dabbagh (18), was shot dead, according to Palestinian reports by Israeli forces, during protests near the Bureij Refugee Camp in the Gaza Strip. He was shot in the head, and was pronounced dead on arrival at the Al-Aqsa hospital. Israel denied any involvement in the incident.
- A Palestinian of Gaza was wounded by Israeli live fire during protests close to Nahal Oz east of Shuja'iyya.

=== 10 September ===
- Lama Marwan Mousa (6) died after her neck was broken when she was run over by a settler's vehicle in the village of Al-Khader. Both initial Palestinian reports and a later Israeli report said the incident was an accident. Local Palestinians said she was standing on a footpath outside her home when a fast vehicle hit her. The Israeli reports states she was crossing the road when the incident took place.

=== 12 September ===
- 2 women IDF soldiers navigating by means of the WAZE GPS device strayed into a Palestinian town of Tulkarem. On approaching the village they had been told to keep walking towards it, whereas a plain clothes Palestinian policeman advised them to go back. Proceeding into the village, they were reportedly slightly injured when rocks were thrown at their vehicle. Local Palestinian police picked them up, and handed them over to the Israeli authorities.
- Ahmad Ziad Abu Daoud (17) and Iyad Naim Abu Daoud (19) were left in a critical condition from injuries when an Israeli military bus reportedly hit them in the al-Fahs area south of Hebron.
- During clashes with Palestinian protesters at Qusra, south of Nablus, Israeli soldiers injured 4 Palestinians. One man (35) was critically wounded by 2 live fire bullets, while another received a head wound from a rubber-coated steel bullet.
- An Israeli border policewoman was injured from stones hurled at her by Palestinians near Tekoa, Gush Etzion.

=== 14 September ===
- A rocket fired from the Gaza Strip landed on agricultural terrain, near the border or in the Eshkol area of southern Israel.

=== 15 September ===
- Israel launched some airstrikes on the Gaza Strip in reprisal. The zones targeted were agricultural lands northwest of Beit Lahiya and the Al-Yarmouk site near Shuja'iyya, suspected militant training grounds. al-Shayma north of Beit Lahiya was also shelled.
- Muhammad Ahmad Abed al-Fattah al-Sarrahin (30) of Beit Ula was shot and later succumbed to his wounds, while fleeing Israeli troops who came to arrest him in military raid on his house. The IDF and Border Police said they managed to apprehend one suspect and shot the other suspect (al-Sarrahin) who tried to flee. The Israeli army launched an investigation.

=== 16 September ===
- A Jordanian man called Said Hayil Amr (28), from al-Mughayyir was shot dead outside the Damascus Gate, in one version, while running towards Israeli Border guards with a knife in each hand yelling 'God is Great'. According to an eyewitness cited by Haaretz, al-Amr yelled "Allahu Akbar" after he was stopped and asked to lift up his shirt, after which he was shot by a nearby officer. The Israeli spokesman Micky Rosenfeld stated that 3 knives were found on his person, and that he intended using them to attack people. No one, other than the Jordanian, was hurt. The attack was caught on film.
- Moussa Muhammad Khaddour (18) was shot dead by Israeli troops close to the settlement of Kiryat Arba after he drove his pickup truck into an Israeli bus stop in a car-ramming attempt. His fiancée Raghad Abdullah Abdullah Khaddour (18) was with him in the vehicle and was critically injured from shot wounds to her stomach. Three Israeli teenagers who fled from the bus-stop were later treated for shock. An Israeli spokesman said a knife had been found on the passenger seat. Both the suspected assailants were from the village of Bani Naim. Raghad had left a letter to her family before the attack, saying she is joining her fiancée in the attack "in order to clear her name". Her sister Majd Khaddour, made a similar attack at the same site on 24 June, injuring two Israelis and was shot dead by Israeli soldiers. In another letter they both reportedly left for the families, they said they want to perpetrate the attack in order to avenge the death of a family member. According to the family, the couple wanted to marry, but didn't receive the blessing from their families, and because Raghad was pregnant, they decided to commit suicide. Khaddour was later released and transferred to a Palestinian hospital after Israeli police established there was no evidence linking her to the attack.
- An Israeli bus driver was lightly injured from flying glass when rocks and paint bottles were thrown at the bus in Highway 1 as he drove it from Jerusalem to the Israeli settlement of Ma'ale Adumim.
- 2 Palestinians were shot, respectively in the hand and leg, in the Gaza Strip from Israeli border fire as a demonstration took place east Al-Bureij refugee camp. Israeli sources identified them as 'instigators' of a riot.
- An Israeli soldier suffered a slight facial wound in a stabbing attack at the Gilbert checkpoint in Hebron. The assailant, Muhammad Thalji Kayid Thalji al-Rajabi (15) was shot dead, after he pulled a knife on being asked for, and showing, his identification papers. The incident occurred near Tel Rumeida.
- Israeli troops shot 2 Palestinian youths during clashes at al-Jalazun refugee camp near the settlement of Beit El.

=== 17 September ===
- Hatem Abdel-Hafiz al-Shaloudi (25) of Tel Rumeida neighborhood in Hebron was shot dead after he stabbed an Israeli soldier near the neighborhood, lightly injuring him. Al-Shaloudi was caught on film, approaching a group of Israeli soldiers in the Tamar checkpoint who asked him to show them his identification card. He gave one of the soldiers a piece of paper, then pulled a knife from his pocket and assaulted the soldier with it, then rushing toward another soldier who apprehended him. Al-Shaloudi continued to try to stab the soldier who had seized him, leading the soldiers to shoot and kill him. His family claim he was shot in cold blood while on his way to the factory where he was employed.
- A teen from Isawiya (15) was arrested after he was caught hurling rocks at vehicles next to Ma'ale Adumim settlement. He managed to hit one bus, causing damage to its front window. No one was injured.

=== 18 September ===
- An Israeli IDF reservist officer (30) was stabbed near his armpit, near the settlement of Efrat in Gush Etzion and was evacuated in moderate condition. His stabber was Baha a-Din Muhammad Khalil Odeh (20) originally of Artas, but resident in Wadi Rahhal, was shot in the head and was evacuated in moderate condition. According to IDF, the assailant was identified by an electronic fence some 440 meters from the settlement some four hours earlier and a force was sent to track him but failed. He allegedly hid behind bushes before he jumped out and attacked the officer with 2 knives.

=== 19 September ===
- At around 07:30, Ayman al-Kurd (20) from the East Jerusalem neighborhood of Ras al-Amud stabbed 2 Israeli police officers stationed on Salah al-Din street, near Jerusalem's Old Quarter. One, a policewoman (38), was wounded in the neck, and transferred to hospital in a critical condition; the other policeman (47) was stabbed several times in the back, and was evacuated in a serious condition. The assailant was in turn shot and evacuated in a serious condition. All Palestinian owned shops on the street were ordered to be shut until further notice.
- Muhannad Jameel al-Rajby (21) and Ameer Jamal al-Rajby (17) from Hebron were shot dead after allegedly attempting to stab Israeli troops near the Tomb of the Patriarchs. The two were said to have been called on to halt while walking towards a checkpoint. They continued, while waving knives and were shot. One died instantly, the other later in hospital from several gunshot wounds. It was later stated that one soldier suffered an abrasion to his hand during the altercation.
- When Israeli forces set up a military checkpoint in Hebron's Wadi al-Harya neighborhood, using a house to establisha military station on the roof, and seized several cars to make a roadblock, clashes with local youth took place in which a Palestinian woman was injured when a tear gas canister was shot and hit her in the chest.
- An Israeli bus driver was lightly wounded in a stone throwing attack on a bus traveling in the Wadi al-Joz neighborhood of Jerusalem.
- A Gazan fisherman, Ahmad Zayid (30), was shot in the stomach by Israeli live fire while fishing off the coast of Beit Lahiya.

=== 20 September ===
- Israeli forces razed Palestinian agricultural facilities and a warehouse in Sur Baher and Beit Hanina
- Two Israeli soldiers were lighty hurt by a molotov cocktail during clashes, following an Israeli arrest raid in Dheisheh refugee camp, south of Bethlehem. One soldier sustained second-degree burns while the other suffered from smoke inhalation.
- Salim Mahmoud Tarayra (16) of Bani Naim, reportedly stepped out of a bus, with a knife in his hand, when the vehicle stopped at the Wadi al-Joz junction checkpoint. Israeli reports say he attempted an attack with the weapon. He was shot dead. No Israeli soldier was injured.
- A Palestinian man in Hebron was photographed while being beaten and kicked by several Israeli soldiers. Israeli sources stated the man resisted being arrested.

=== 21 September ===
- A Palestinian teenager, Bara'a Ramadan Eweisa(Owaisi) (12/13), was shot in the leg after she approached the Israeli checkpoint of Eliyahu in Qalqiliya near the settlement of Alfei Menashe, and refused to stop when ordered to halt. Initial Israeli reports spoke of a thwarted terrorist attack, and security personnel thought a bag she had might have explosive material, and that she had put her hand into her shirt. No explosives or weapons were found among her effects, and on interrogation she is reported to have said she came to die. The girl denied ever having said this, stating instead that she wanted to see where or how her aunt, killed at the same checkpoint several month before, had died. An Israeli court subsequently ordered her release after it judged that she did not intend stabbing anyone and had no knife in her possession.

=== 22 September ===
- In predawn clashes with Israeli troops escorting 700 Israelis in 14 buses to visit Joseph's Tomb in Nablus, a local Palestinian youth was shot by a rubber-coated steel bullet in the leg.
- 2 IDF soldiers engaged in escorting the Jewish visitors to Joseph's Tomb were caught on camera setting fire to a Palestinian lumberyard and storehouse in Nablus, causing damages amounting to an estimated $39,000.

=== 23 September ===
- A Palestinian boy, Usama Murad Jamil Marie Zeidat (15), was shot after reportedly sneaking up towards soldiers stationed at the Elias junction near the Israeli settlement of Kiryat Arba, and producing a knife. The boy sustained moderate to critical wounds from being shot in the stomach. No Israelis were injured.
- Three Palestinians were reportedly shot with live fire in the Gaza Strip, 2 east of Gaza City and the third east of el-Bureij Refuigee Camp. Israeli sources spoke of stopping an attempt to infiltrate Israel.

=== 27 September ===
- Palestinians hurled rocks at the Jerusalem Light Rail in the Shuafat neighborhood. No one was injured but the windshield of the lead car was damaged.
- Two Israelis were lightly injured from a molotov cocktail thrown at their car near Al-Lubban ash-Sharqiya in the West Bank. The car was damaged.
- Four cisterns providing well water for sheep and crop irrigation were demolished in the Jurat al-Kheil area east of the Palestinian village of Sa'ir. Israeli authorities said the structures lacked Israeli permits.
- Two houses, each with 2 residential units owed by the Abu al-Hawa brothers were demolished At-Tur, East Jertusalem for lack of Israeli permits, leaving 16 homeless.
- A restaurant run by Imad Burqan for 2 decades in Beit Safafa in East Jerusalem was demolished for lack of an Israeli permit.

=== 28 September ===
- One Israeli settler, in a car of three, was injured when a Molotov cocktail hit their vehicle as it drove by the Palestinian village of al-Lubban al-Sharqiya. The car was damaged.
- Imad Jaber was forced to destroy his own home, housing his family of 6 and.built a decade earlier, in Beit Hanina (Eastr Jerusalem) to avoid paying Israeli fines. Rami Allon, father of 7 children, also of Beit Hanina, was forced to demolish his home, following an Israeli court order.

=== 29 September ===
- Muhammad Hussein Khweis (20) was hospitalized after suffering severe head injuries when he was hit in the back of the head by an Israeli sound bomb during clashes in At-Tur, East Jerusalem.

=== 30 September ===
- Six Palestinians were injured during clashes and northern and central Gaza Strip; five were hit by live fire near the Nahal Oz border crossing in the northern Gaza Strip and another one was injured near Bureij in the central Gaza Strip. The rioters entered the Israeli army buffer zone on the border and some also damaged the security fence on the border.
- An Israeli soldier (24) was moderately wounded in the upper body when a Palestinian assailant stabbed him at the Qalandiya checkpoint. The assailant, Naseem Abu Meizar (28) a Jerusalem resident from Kafr Aqab, was shot dead by the soldier and other troops. In the hour after the attack some 200 Palestinians were rioting in the area.

== October ==
=== 4 October ===
- The family of Umm Tamer Zyada was harassed as they harvested olives from their gardens in Tel Rumeida. The incident was caught on video,

=== 5 October ===
- Palestinian militants from the salafist Ahfad al-Sahaba-Aknaf Bayt al-Maqdis group, said to be affiliated to Islamic State, in Beit Hanoun in the Gaza Strip fired a rocket on the Israeli city of Sderot which hit a road in the city. No one was injured but three people: a 15-year-old girl, a 60-year-old man and another person were treated for shock. The road was slightly damaged.
- In retaliation for the rocket attack, Israeli tanks fired a shell at the a Hamas site in Beit Hanoun and at the al-Qassam Brigades's al-Qadisiya training ground in Khan Yunis. An airstrike struck the al-Wahah headquarters of Gaza's naval police in Beit Lahiya. A third strike hit an agricultural field in the northern Gaza Strip. The Jabal al-Rayis east of Gaza City was shelled by Israeli artillery. Further Palestinian reports state that al-Tuffah and Shuja'iyya neighborhoods of Gaza City, together with the al-Sourani Mountain area, received fire.*
- 7.4 acres of an olive grove in Wad al-Raqaqi near Beit Ula owned by the al-Sarahin were bulldozed by the Israeli army.
- A 12-year-old prunus orchard extending over 1.5 acres was bulldozed by Israeli forces in Tawas.

=== 6 October ===
- A rocket fired from the Gaza Strip struck open land in the Eshkol Regional Council area of Israel. Israel responded by shelling a site reportedly used by militants in the central Gaza Strip

=== 7 October ===
- Two Palestinian were wound by live fire from Israeli forces near El Bureij Refugee Camp while protesting.
- According to the Palestinian Red Crescent Society 52 persons were either hit by rubber-coated steel bullets or suffered tear gas intoxication during clashes outside sa at Al Quds University in Abu Dis, East Jerusalem,

=== 9 October ===
- A molotov cocktail was thrown at an Israeli vehicle near Tuqu'. A woman who was in the vehicle was treated for shock.
- Israeli forces destroyed 9 structures residences, agricultural structures, solar panels, and water pipes in the al-Ras al-Ahmar area district of Tubas, in the Jordan Valley sector of the West Bank.
- In the 2016 Jerusalem shooting, an Israeli woman, former Knesset employee Levanah Malichi (60) and Policeman First Sgt. Yosef Kirme (29) were shot and killed by a Palestinian, Misbah Abu Sbeih (39), from Silwan, East Jerusalem. The assailant, who was set to begin a four-month prison sentence for attacking a policeman, started his shooting rampage, equipped with an M16 assault-rifle According to a Palestinian report, Sbeih was due to turn himself in to Israeli police at 10 am on Sunday. He informed the Palestinian News Service Ma'an of his intention to do so the day earlier. He had been accused of assaulting an Israeli policeman outside the Al-Aqsa mosque in 2013, and believed the case had been closed. He spent a year in prison for writing what were deemed incitement posts on his Facebook page and on his release found the assault case had been reopened, resulting in a further four-month sentence. His assault, in which two Israelis were killed, and five people were wounded, began at Ammunition Hill in East Jerusalem, where he opened fire at civilians and hit Malich, who was severely injured and later succumbed to her wounds. Another woman (50) was hit in the upper body and remained in critical condition. Then he drove south and proceeded an intersection, where he again opened fire at civilians, hitting a Palestinian man from Hebron (68) in his upper body and another man (30) in his limbs then he drove into Sheikh Jarrah neighborhood, where he stopped his vehicle and fired at two policemen who pursued him on motorbikes: first Sgt. Yosef Kirme died of wounds sustained during the chase, and the other policeman who was moderately wounded. The assailant was then shot while inside his vehicle and later succumbed to his wounds. According to Magen David Adom two women (23 and 42) were lightly wounded when the assailant's vehicle collided with theirs and three other suffered from shock, bringing the total number of casualties to eleven, including the deceased victims and assailant. The West Bank pastry shop business run by Sbeih's family was closed two days later by Israeli police, claiming that it was a "center for incitement" that "encouraged terrorism" by making videos.
- Seven Palestinian youth were wounded by rubber-coated steel bullets and two Israeli soldiers (a male officer and a female soldier) were wounded from stones hurled during clashes that erupted after Israeli troops raided the house of Abu Sbeih, the perpetrator of the earlier shooting rampage, in the town of Al-Ram next to Jerusalem. Clashes also erupted in Bab a-Zahara and Shuafat inside Jerusalem.
- An Israeli bus passenger was lightly injured when his bus was hit by rocks hurled south of Hebron.
- Majdi Muhammad, a Palestinian photographer employed by the Associated Press, was shot and lightly wounded in his back from a rubber bullet fired an Israeli soldier during clashes in al-Ram. He said that one of the soldiers ordered him to leave while cursing him, and while Muhammad turned around the soldier fired a rubber bullet at part of his back, not covered by his protective vest.

=== 10 October ===
- The Palestinian Red Crescent reported that two Palestinian workers were shot by Israeli forces in their lower body in the region of Wadi Abu al-Hummus south of Bethlehem. The circumstances were not clear. The IDF did not confirm the incident.
- Settlers from the Eli settlement attacked, reportedly with hatchets, Sahir Mousa and his family while they harvested olives on their property outside Qaryut. They were forced to desist, and their car was damaged. Israeli police were looking into the report.
- The IDF mapped the house of the shooter from yersterday's attack before demolition. During the operation, Palestinian protesters threw an improvised explosive device at the soldiers, and one sustained light injuries from the shrapnel.

=== 11 October ===
- A stone was hurled at a bus near the Nablus Gate in Jerusalem, causing damage to its windshield.
- Three Palestinians were shot by Israeli forces and injured near the 'Azza refugee camp in Bethlehem after throwing molotov cocktails at Israeli soldiers.. The incident took place near the Rachel's Tomb, where soldiers were deployed. One of the Palestinians was shot in his shoulder and the rest were shot in their legs.
- 4 Palestinians were injured by Israeli live fire when soldiers targeted their lower bodies during clashes, in the second day of disturbances following the Abu Sbeih drive-by shooting rampage in East Jerusalem.

=== 12 October ===
- On the fourth day of rioting, dozens of Palestinian rioters were injured by live fire and rubber coated steel bullets shot by Israeli forces during clashes in al-Ram near Jerusalem, after a resident of the town killed an Israeli woman and policemen and a drive-by shooting on 9 October. According to Wafa, Israeli vehicles entered the village, provoking riots by Palestinians who threw rocks at Israeli vehicles.
- Ali Atef Shuyukhi (20) was shot, critically injured and died soon after while during night clashes with Israeli forces in Silwan, East Jerusalem.. Conflicting Palestinian reports say he was shot in the stomach or chest. Another Palestinian was struck by a rubber-coated steel bullet in the eye. Shuyukhi had served a 15-month sentence for rock-throwing and participating in riots. Hamas' spokesman said he was a member of the organization and that he was buried within two hours over fears the Israeli forces might take his body.
- Palestinian riots also occurred in the neighborhoods of Isawiya and Jabel Mukaber, where rioters hurled rocks and molotov cocktails. In Isawiya the rioters blocked the entrance to the neighborhood with burning trash canisters. The Israeli army closed the entrance to the neighborhood after the rioters hurled rocks at the road leading to Ma'ale Adumim.
- Palestinians fired at an Israeli Army vehicle near the village of Na'alin. The soldiers responded with fire and the shooters fled. Suspects were arrested in the following day.

=== 13 October ===
- Throughout the day, there were three incidents of stone throwing at the Jerusalem Light Rail at the axis of Shuafat. No one was injured, but damage was done to the rails.
- Palestinian residents of Beit Hanina in East Jerusalem hurled rocks at an Israeli police car, damaging its windshield.
- Palestinian sources allege that Israeli fire was responsible for the death of Abdullah Nasser Atwa Abu Mdeif (10), who died after being shot in the back in the al-Qarrara area east of Khan Younis. An Israeli spokesman stated he had died from collateral damage when guns were fired at a local wedding.

=== 14 October ===
- 2 Bedouin residential shacks near Jericho belonging to Ali Suliman al-Mleihat and Muhammad Ali al-Mleihat were confiscated by Israeli forces.
- A Palestinian from Gaza was shot by live fire during clashes near the border with Israel
- An Israeli soldier was lightly injured from shrapnel as a result of firing by Palestinians during violent riots in Qabatiya.

=== 15 October ===
- An Israeli soldier was stabbed by a Palestinian and lightly wounded near the settlement of Har Adar.
- Fares Ziad al-Bayed (16) was shot in the head by Israeli live fire and sustained critical injuries at the al-Jalazone refugee camp near Ramallah. Another 20 youths were wounded by rubber-coated steel bullets, 3 receiving head wounds. The incidents occurred during clashes, with exchanges of stone throwing, motolov cocktails and tear gas that arose after a march to commemorate the killing of Ahmad Sharaka (13) a year earlier. He lay in a coma for two months and died on 23 December. The 17 year old Palestinian stabber from Beit Furik was arrested in early December by the Shin Bet

=== 16 October ===
- Israeli settlers at the Israeli outpost of Havat Gilad reportedly harassed Palestinian olive harvesters from the villages of Jit and Fara'ata in the Qalqiliya district, and Sarra in the Nablus district.
- Ahmad Hamamdeh (18) and Amjad Kemail (21) were shot during an Israeli raid that led to clashes with residents of the village of Qabatiya in the Jenin district whe
- As part of rioting in Silwan following the attack by a resident who killed two Israelis, Palestinians hurled several molotov cocktails at Jewish houses, causing damage to them.

=== 17 October ===
- An Israeli bus driver was lightly injured in his face from flying glass caused by stone throwing near Beitar Illit.

=== 18 October ===
- Two Israeli people were lightly injured when stones were thrown at their vehicle in A-Tur neighborhood in East Jerusalem. A 19-year-old teen from the neighborhood was arrested on suspicion.
- An Israeli person was lightly injured by a stone thrown at him near the Lion's Gate in East Jerusalem.
- Two 14-year-old Palesitnians teen were caught by Israeli police while hurling rocks at security forces in Wadi Joz

=== 19 October ===
- Rahiq Shaji Birawi (23) of Asira ash-Shamaliya was shot dead by Israeli soldiers at the Za'atar checkpoint/Tapuah Junction after she reportedly approached the soldiers and ignored their directives to stop. According to initial Israeli reports she pulled out a knife causing the soldiers to shoot at her after reportedly firing warning shots into the air. An internal investigation was opened up when it emerged that after one soldier had shot her in the legs, a further 4 soldiers also fired at her. The incident was partially caught on video. It appears she was shot some 30 times.

=== 20 October ===
- Khalid Bahr Ahmad Bahr (15) was shot and killed while throwing stones at Israeli soldiers in Beit Ummar. Israeli reports say warning shots were fired before the incident, in which an Israeli soldier was lightly injured, and were ignored. The teen was then shot dead with a bullet in the chest. The IDF opened a probe into the incident, which concluded no Israeli soldier was in danger when the boy was shot dead.
- A Palestinian from Silwan hit two Israelis with his motorbike. It was originally treated as a traffic accident. After a search in his apartment uncovered a knife, he was later charged with deliberately ramming them.

=== 21 October ===
- A Gazan man (50) was shot in the foot by Israeli live fire during a confrontation with Israeli border guards near the El Bureij Refugee Camp and the buffer zone.

=== 22 October ===
- Stones were hurled at the Jerusalem Light Rail in the axis of Shuafat, causing damage to train.
- Palestinian agricultural structures were destroyed by Israeli bulldozers engaged in clearing Palestinian land in the eastern sector of the village of Deir al-Hatab.

=== 23 October ===
- One of 3 Palestinians was shot in the leg when they approached the fence of Beit El settlement.

=== 24 October ===
- In response to a projectile said to have been fired towards Israel but which fell within the Gaza Strip, Israeli forces shelled a Hamas military post by the name of "Palestinian resistance," east of Beit Hanoun.

=== 25 October ===
- A 13-year-old Palestinian from Isawiya was caught hurling stones at vehicles in the road between Jerusalem and Ma'ale Adumim.
- Muhammad Daoud (61) was seriously injured and his wife Naela Hassan Ali Daoud, (58) moderately so when the couple's horse-drawn cart was hit reportedly by a settler's vehicle, near the village of al-Nabi Elyas and the Israeli settlement of Alfei Menashem It is unknown whether it was an accident or deliberate. The husband later died of his wounds.

=== 26 October ===
- An Israeli soldier suffered a slight facial wound from stones hurled at him in Rachel's Tomb near Bethlehem.
- Three homes, one owned by Nasser al-Rajabi, a second by Ahmad Abd al-Razaq Siyam and a third by Thaer Ismael Siyam, were demolished by Israeli forces in the al-Ashqariya area of Beit Hanina north of Jerusalem for lack of Israeli permits.
- 4 apartments in Silwan housing an extended family of Issa Jaffreh, were demolished leaving 36 people displaced. The house was built 17 years ago. Municipal authorities say the land is destined for a public park for the community.
- Ali Baradiyya, Muhammad Ibrahim Ghanim, Omar Baradiyya, Muhammad al-Qadi, and Ahmad al-Qadi, all of Surif were injured when an Israeli military vehicle crashed into their car west of Hebron. One of the injured claimed the ramming was deliberate.

=== 27 October ===
- Palestinian sources state 12 Palestinians were injured by rubber-coated steel bullets or tear gas inhalation during clashes with Israeli forces at the Shuafat Refugee camp

=== 28 October ===
- An Israeli military outpost near the settlement of Yitzhar was defaced with graffiti of swastikas and "death to the Jews". In response the Israeli army barred Palestinian farmers from the area, who were supposed to harvest olives.
- Palestinian man who hurled rocks at vehicles next to the Israeli settlement of Tekoa. The man fled the scene and his condition is unknown.
- Israel forces evicted Palestinian farmers harvesting their olives on their agricultural lands in the village of Qusin, west of Nablus, while arresting one of the group Radwan Mutlaq Abu Laila (45)
- Two Palestinians in the Gaza Strip were reportedly injured in clashes with Israeli troops near the Nahal Oz border crossing, and a third was reportedly hurt east of the al-Bureij refugee camp

=== 29 October ===
- Ahmad Ayman Hamid (21) was shot by Israeli soldiers after allegedly attempting to ram Israeli soldiers next to the settlement of Ofra. The soldiers opened fire at the car, leading him to leave his vehicle holding a cleaver and then to be shot again. He was severely injured and evacuated to a hospital in Jerusalem. Locals told Ma'an News Agency that Hamid was "left to bleed" before he was evacuated, and that his family house was raided in the predawn by Israeli soldiers who interrogated his family members. The incident occurred between Ein Yabrud and Ofra The attack occurred in a checkpoint set by the Kfir Brigade after a day earlier, an unknown assailant opened fire at the settlement of Ofra, not causing casualties or damage. The IDF and the Shin Bet were investigating if there is a connection between the attacks.
- 18 olive trees in a grove belonging to the Fanun family in the Wadi al-Hariq area of Nahhalin were cut down, according to Palestinian sources, by settlers. From thjer Gush Etzion Bloc-The grove is close to the Bat Ayin settlement
- An Israeli woman came under fire while driving near a junction leading to her home in the Israeli settlement of Karmei Tzur.

=== 30 October ===
- Three Israeli border guards were lightly injured while conducting a security mission near the Gush Etzion settlement block in an apparent ramming attack in Beit Ummar. The assailant was shot and killed by other troops in the area. He was identified as Khalid Ahmad Elayyan Ikhlayyil (23) of Beit Ummar.

=== 31 October ===
- Three Israeli soldiers were injured: one moderately; two lightly, after a Mohammad Turkamen (25), a Palestinian police officer from Qabatiya, opened fire at them at a checkpoint next to the Israeli settlement of Beit El. Turkamen was shot and killed by troops in the area. Palestinian authorities were investigating whether the attack came as revenge for anger or frustration after Palestinian security agents searched his house earlier that week, suspecting he may be concealing weapons and ammunition that he did not need for his police work.

== November ==
=== 1 November ===
- Officials working for the Israeli Nature and Parks Authority destroyed 6 Palestinian gravesites in the Bab al-Rahma cemetery off the eastern wall of Jerusalemn's Old Quarter. According to the director of Al Aqsa mosque, documents show the graves were the property of the al-Husseini and al-Ansari families. The Israeli authorities claim that they have confiscated the property to turn it into a park.

=== 2 November ===
- Israel forces bulldozed the 2 storey home of Thalji Suleiman, built recently without an Israeli permit, which the family had, without success, tried to obtain, in the East Jerusalem village of Beit Hanina

=== 3 November ===
- Maen Nasser al-Din Abu Qaraa (23) from Al-Zaitounah was shot and killed after reportedly attempting to stab Israeli soldiers at a bus stop next to the Israeli settlement of Ofra.
- An Israeli soldier was lightly injured in his knee after he was shot by an unknown assailant at a checkpoint near the city of Tulkarem
- Jaber Barakat Abu Fekheideh of al-Janiya was said to have been critically wounded and 2 other Palestinians were also injured after settlers threw rocks at him and his brothers as they were harvesting olives on their land in the al-Batha area near the Israeli settlement of Talmon.

=== 5 November ===
- Four Palestinian farmers of the Abu Fahida family were injured after being reportedly attacked by masked Israeli settlers. The incident took place during olive harvest near the Palestinian village of Al-Janiya west of Ramallah, near the Israeli settlement of Talmon. One of the victims was treated in serious condition with head wounds. The victims told that a group of settlers (twenty according to their relative) attacked them while harvesting olives, using stones and clubs.

=== 7 November ===
- A 15-year-old Palestinian teenager was arrested by Israeli police after he hurled rocks at police officers and border guards in Jerusalem.
- 30 Deir Sharaf Palestinian families claim that, on finally being allowed by the IDF to access their olive groves, they found 400 olive trees had been picked clean, and charge that Israeli settlers had taken the harvest. The zone is near the Israeli settlement of Shavei Shomron.

=== 8 November ===
- A pipe bomb was thrown at the Rachel's Tomb compound near Bethlehem. One man was treated for shock.
- Israeli authorities bulldozed a 3-story Palestinian building in Wadi Joz for lack of a permit. They also bulldozed a house in Issawiya.
- Palestinian sources claim Adam Bassam Salim (22) of Azzun was assaulted by Israeli forces.

=== 9 November ===
- Mohammed-Amar Jalad (25) from Tulkarem was critically wounded by Israel troops stationed at the Huwwara checkpoint in the West Bank. Israeli sources described him as a terrorist attempting to assault soldiers with a screwdriver. The family reported that the youth had won a green card residence permit for the US, was studying accountancy, and had contracted Hodgkin's lymphoma. On the day he was shot, he was going to his last chemotherapy session, realized he had got into the wrong shared taxi (for Ramallah), and ran across the road to take one going in the opposite direction (to Nablus). His haste was interpreted as an attack. He spent 3 months in an Israeli hospital and died, still under arrest, sometime in early February 2017.
- Israeli forces demolished a Palestinian car wash business in Beit Hanina for lack of a permit. The business owned by Abd al-Rauf and Abdullah Maraqa had been active for 4 years. Financial losses for equipment destroyed during demolition are calculated at $52,438.
- Mahmoud al-Hadra's home at al-Tur in East Jerusalem was demolished by Israeli bulldozers for lack of an Israeli permit.

=== 10 November ===
- A Palestinian demonstrator, A.Z. (15) of Ramallah was shot in his leg and hand by Israeli soldiers after throwing a stone at a military watchtower during a student demonstration at the 'Atara Checkpoint just north of Birzeit, marking the 12th anniversary for the death of Palestinian leader Yasser Arafat. The protester, shot once in the hand and twice in the thigh as he was reportedly dismantling a sandbag defense nearby, was then treated and taken into custody, where he was treated while being shackled to a bed for several days.
- 2 Palestinian structures in Qualqilya were bulldozed by Israeli forces: an agricultural shed owned by Abdulbaset Khayzaran and Hilme Aba's agricultural shed and water tank.
- 4 Palestinian youths were injured by Israeli forces Israeli forces firing rubber-coated steel bullets in Beituniya while clashes erupted near Israel's Ofer detention centre.

=== 13 November ===
- An Israeli bus driver was lightly injured from flying glass caused by rocks thrown at him on Highway 60 near the settlement of Ofra.
- Muhammad Khalil Abd al-Latif Jaabis was forced by an Israeli court order to demolish 2 apartments in his family's home in Jabel Mukaber, leaving 12 members homeless.

=== 14 November ===
- An explosive device was detonated near an IDF patrol next to the Palestinian town of al-Khader. No one was injured.
- An Israeli bus was damaged by rocks hurled near Pisgat Ze'ev in East Jerusalem.
- Al-Najjar was forced to destroy his fruit-and-vegetable store in Beit Hanina, operative for 9 years, for contravening Israeli regulations. 4 households depended on its income.
- Nidal Ghaith demolished his construction and sanitary materials shop in Beit Hanina to avoid paying Israeli demolition fees. It had been in operation for three years and 5 households depended on its income.

=== 15 November ===
- Israel bulldozers razed a horse stable and agricultural tools shack owned by Alaa Shweiki in the al-Thuri area of Silwan
- Two 13-year-old Palestinian teenagers were arrested after hurling rocks at a vehicle with tourists in Silwan, East Jerusalem. The two admitted they hurled rocks.

=== 17 November ===
- A molotov was hurled into a Jewish home's balcony in Ma'ale ha-Zeitim neighborhood of East Jerusalem. No one was injured, but damage was done to the balcony.

=== 18 November ===
- Muhammad Abu Sa'ed (26) of Nuserat Refugee Camp was killed by Israeli soldiers during clashes near Bureij. The incident occurred during a Palestinian protest in the IDF buffer zone, when Palestinians tried to breach the Gaza–Israel barrier. Sa'ed was shot dead while at a distance of 10–15 meters from a group of some 20 soldiers after he reportedly threw a clod of earth that hit a female soldier. Another three Palestinians were injured. Saada became the 25th protester to be killed by Israeli forces in the Gaza Strip since protests began in October 2015.
- A Palestinian was shot through the mouth by a rubber-coated steel bullet during clashes with Israeli troops at the West Bank village of Tuqu'.

=== 19 November ===
- Palestinians claim that during a dawn raid on al-Quds University in Abu Dis Israeli troops damaged books at a fair organized for needy students and damaged several computers. It was the 8th time the University had been raided since 2014.

=== 20 November ===
- An army bus was hit by rocks near the Geva Binyamin settlement in the West Bank, lightly injuring three soldiers. Another Israeli bus was damaged in a similar incident near Beit Ummar.

=== 21 November ===
- Mahmoud Salah was shot in the foot as he crossed from the West Bank into the Jerusalem area, apparently in search of work. The incident occurred west of Bethlehem in the Wadi Abu al-Hummus zone.

=== 22 November ===
- Jihad Muhammad Said Khalil (48) from the village of Beit Wazan was shot dead at the Qalandiya checkpoint. Israeli reports said he approached the checkpoint wielding a knife, that a guard noticed when Khalil was asked for his identification papers that he had his hand in his pocket, and then pulled out the knife and tried to stab him; that Khalil was shot after a fist fight with an Israeli guard.
- The house of Mahmoud al-Hadra in At-Tur was bulldozed by Israeli forces for lack of a permit.
- A restaurant run by Moussa Naim Fatafta in Silwan was sealed off by Israeli authorities for lack of a permit, leaving 4 families without an income.

=== 25 November ===
- Muhammad Nabil Zeidan (15) was shot down by Israeli police after he allegedly approached them wielding a knife at a checkpoint outside Shuafat, in East Jerusalem.

=== 29 November ===
- Israeli authorities demolished two Palestinian structures in East Jerusalem, one in Jabel Mukaber, which they said was on land designated by Israel as 'public open space.' The other, a housing extension without an Israeli permit, was in Silwan.

== December ==
=== 1 December ===
- Two Israeli border policemen were injured by stones thrown at them as they conducted a patrol with other policemen in Adam Square, an intersection north of Jerusalem, near Kalandia. The two, one who was hit in the face and the other who was hit in the chest, were taken to a hospital with minor injuries.

=== 2 December ===
- A Palestinian youth was injured during clashes with Israeli policy near the Nahal Oz transit point

=== 3 December ===
- Said al-Abbasia and Nasser al-Abbasia, two brothers and the fathers of 12 children, were compelled to demolish their homes, built over two years ago, in Silwan, for lack of an Israeli permit. They say their attempt to get a permit was consistently refused. Israel maintains the land is designated for an "open space reserve." The demolition was necessary to avoid paying the costs of an Israeli demolition.
- Stones were hurled at a police car in Silwan and A-Tur in Jerusalem. No one was injured, but damage was made to the police car.

=== 7 December ===
- 3 Palestinean structures, including car washes, were bulldozed by Israeli authorities in al-Nabi Samwil and al-Khalayleh.

=== 8 December ===
- An 18 year old Palestinian from Qalqilya was shot dead after he aroused the suspicion of Israeli security personnel at the Tapuach Junction after he left a bus and proceeded in their direction. Border Police soldiers called on the suspicious individual to stop, he failed to respond and continued walking toward them before pulling out a knife and attacking them. He was shot and pronounced dead shortly after. None of the soldiers were injured.
- Seven Palestinian youths were shot by rubber-coated steel bullets during clashes with Israeli police inside Shuafat Refugee Camp, East Jerusalem.

=== 12 December ===
- A 15-year-old Palestinian was arrested after he and other teenagers hurled rocks at cars in Highway 60 near Al-Lubban ash-Sharqiya.

=== 13 December ===
- Palestinians allege that Muhammad Abu al-Hummus was first threatened with being shot unless he left an area in Isawiya, East Jerusalem, where he was photographing and documenting events, and then was shot in the leg by another soldier standing some 25 metres away shortly afterwards.

=== 14 December ===
- One border policeman suffered a light head injury after he was stabbed at by a young Palestinian man, Hamad Khader al-Sheikh (21), from Beit Surik wielding a screwdriver near the Church of the Holy Family in Jerusalem's Old City. The attacker was shot and wounded, and later died of his wounds. A Palestinian schoolboy, Fahmi Juwilis (13), was hit by one of the stray bullets fired by the police as he was leaving school nearby. He suffered a fractured and slight injuries to the head and required surgery.
- Unknown gunmen fired at a vehicle carrying an Israeli mother and two daughters near the Palestinian village Deir Abu Mash'al. The vehicle was damaged but no one was injured.
- Israeli authorities bulldozed a two-level Palestinian residential building under construction in Beit Hanina for lack of Israeli permits.

=== 15 December ===
- Six Israeli policemen were injured by stone throwing in Shuafat neighborhood in East Jerusalem, as they were investigating the death of an Arab man.

=== 17 December ===
- A 40 year old Palestinian man was lightly injured in his leg after Israeli guards of the Ministry of Construction in Silwan, East Jerusalem. The guards said they felt in danger as they were caught in a clash with Palestinians in the neighborhood, who hurled rocks and other objects at them. One of the guards claimed he was beaten. The police arrived at the scene and arrested both the guards and Palestinians who were at the scene.

=== 18 December ===
- Ahmad Hazem 'Ata Zidani (a-Rimawi) (17) died after being shot in the chest with live ammunition after clashes with Israeli forces in Beit Rima, near Ramallah. During the clashes, which are defined by Israeli sources as 'riots' one Border Police officer was reportedly injured by rock/stone throwing. The IDF had been conducting searches in the village for some days. Another Palestinian was injured in the clashes. A B'tselem investigation stated that Zidani was shot as he was fleeing to seek cover after having thrown stones. A paint can and a Molotov cocktail had been thrown at a military jeep earlier.

=== 19 December ===
- An Israeli man in his 20s was lightly injured from glass shards in a drive-by shooting near the Israeli settlement of Halamish. At least four bullets were fired at the vehicle near the Palestinian village of Aboud.
- An Israeli tank fired three shells at an observation tower of Hamas near the Bureij refugee camp in the central Gaza Strip after shots were fired at Israeli troops near the Gaza barrier by unknown gunmen. No casualties were reported on both sides.

=== 21 December ===
- Israeli forces demolished a 55sq. metre Palestinian flat in East Jerusalem, for lack of an Israeli building permit.

=== 22 December ===
- Israeli forces shot dead Ahmad al-Kharroubi(19) with a bullet to the neck after he threw a Molotov cocktail in their direction during clashes at Kafr Aqab in East Jerusalem.
- Palestinians claim an Israeli settler guard at Karmei Tzur attempted to run over two children at Beit Ummar. According to an eyewitness, his car 'drifted' in the direction of the two, while pointing a gun their way.

=== 23 December ===
- An Israeli suffered a light to moderate knife wounds in the back when he was attacked by a Palestinians outside the West Bank settlement of Efrat.
- A Palestinian Hamzeh Abu Zuhra (24) was reportedly beaten up by Israel border officials at Allenby Bridge, while in transit and returning to Nablus from Jordan.
- Israel forces used live on Palestinian protesters in the buffer zone, outside Nahal Oz, in the Gaza Strip. One Gazan youth was moderately wounded.
- An Israel soldier was shot in the leg at Balata Refugee Camp during army operations in Nablus. Thousands of shekels were confiscated from a house in the village of Sa'ir. Israel claimed the day before that it had uncovered a Hamas terrorist cell, consisting of 21 people, recruiting people for suicide bombings.
- 3 Palestinian youths were shot with rubber-coated steel bullets at the weekly protest march in Kafr Qaddum. The protests have been ongoing since 2011.

=== 26 December ===
Mahdi Dweikat (20) of Balata Refugee Camp was shot in the foot by Israeli forces escorting Israelis to Joseph's Tomb in Nablus. The youth was said to have thrown a fire bomb. The area falls within the territorial jurisdiction of the Palestinian National Authority.

=== Overview 27 December 2016 – 9 January 2017 ===
86 Palestinian structures in Area C of the West Bank and East Jerusalem were destroyed or confiscated for lack of Israeli permits. 160 Palestinians, including 91 children, were displaced, a further 370 were affected. 34 Palestinians, including 8 children were injured during clashes with Israeli troops throughout the West Bank. In 161 search and/or arrest operations 212 Palestinians were arrested.9 incidents involving the throwing of stones or Molotov cocktails at Israeli vehicles were reported. No one was injured, but some settler vehicles were damaged.

== See also ==
- 2015–2016 wave of violence in the Israeli–Palestinian conflict
- House demolition in the Israeli–Palestinian conflict
- Israeli settler violence
- List of Israeli price tag attacks
- Palestinian rocket attacks on Israel
- Palestinian political violence
