= Jifna =

Palestinian village in Ramallah and al-Bireh, State of Palestine

- Municipality type D (Village council)

Arabic transcription(s)
  - Arabic: جفنا
  - Latin: Jufna (official); Gifna (unofficial)
- Location of Jifna within Palestine
- Coordinates: 31°57′43″N 35°12′56″E
- Palestine grid: 170/152
- State: State of Palestine
- Governorate: Ramallah and al-Bireh

Government
  - Type: Village council (from 1954)
  - Head of Municipality: Gabi Na'im Kamil

Area
  - Total: 6.0 km^{2} (2.3 sq mi)

Population (2017)
  - Total: 2,919
  - Density: 490/km^{2} (1,300/sq mi)
- Name meaning: Gophna

Jifna (Arabic: جفنا, Jifnâ) is a Palestinian village in the Ramallah and al-Bireh Governorate in the central West Bank of the State of Palestine, located 8 kilometers (5.0 mi) north of Ramallah and 23 kilometers (14 mi) north of Jerusalem. Jifna has retained a Christian majority since the 6th century. Its total land area consists of 6,015 dunams, of which 420 are designated as built-up areas, most of the remainder being covered with olive, fig and apricot groves. Jifna is governed by a village council, led (2008) by chairman Jabi Na'im Kamil.

Jifna was known as Gophnah (Hebrew: גופנה; Ancient Greek: Γοφνα, Gophna) at the time of the First Jewish-Roman War, and after its conquest became a Roman regional capital, though remaining predominantly Jewish. Jewish presence at the site is thought to have ended in the aftermath of the Bar Kokhba revolt. Later, the town grew less significant politically, but nevertheless prospered as a Christian locality under Byzantine and later Arab rule due to its location on a trade route. St. George's Church in Jifna was built in the 6th century, but fell into disrepair and was not rebuilt until the arrival of the Crusaders in the late 10th century. However, it again fell into ruin after the Crusaders were driven out by the Ayyubids. In modern times, the ruins of St. George's Church have become a tourist attraction. During the period of Ottoman control in Palestine the tower of an ancient Roman structure in Jifna became the location of a jail house.

Jifna has local traditions and legends relating to the Holy Family, and to the village water-spring. It is also locally known for its apricot harvest festival; each year, during the late Spring period, hundreds travel to the village to harvest the fruit during its brief season.

== History ==
=== Classical period ===
Jifna is first recorded in written history at the time of the Roman conquest during the 1st century bce, when it appears in various records as "Gophna". Gophna was described by Flavius Josephus as the second city of Judea, after Jerusalem, in his account of the First Jewish-Roman Wars during the 1st century ce. The town is depicted as Gophna in the Map of Madaba, situated north of Gibeon (al-Jib), and is also mentioned in rabbinic literature as Beit Gūfnīn, literally meaning a "house of vineyards". The Talmud mentions the place as being inhabited by priests of Aaron's lineage.

The earliest mention of Jifna, then Gophna, in the historical record is in Josephus' account of the escape of Judah Maccabee from Antiochus V during the Maccabean revolt, circa 164 BCE. Under Roman rule, Gophna became a regional administrative center, the capital of a toparchy in the Iudaea Province. It was known by the Romans as Cofna. Around 50 ce, the Roman general Cassius sold the population into slavery, for failure to pay taxes. They were freed, however, by Mark Antony shortly after he came to power. Jifna was within the area under John b. Hananiah's command in 66 ce, during the First Jewish-Roman War, and was the headquarters of one of the twelve toparchies (administrative districts) of Judea. The Roman emperor Vespasian occupied the town in the year 68, established an army garrison there, and concentrated within the city Jewish priests and other local notables who had surrendered to him. Titus, the future Roman emperor, passed through Gophna during his march to besiege Jerusalem in the year 70. Gophna had a sizable priestly Jewish population on the wake of the Bar Kokhba Revolt in the 130s, and it is possible that an entire synagogue congregation of Gophna (including priests) relocated to Sepphoris in Galilee by the 3rd century.

A burial cave was found in Jifna in 1995, and excavations at the site revealed potsherds typical of the Hasmonean, Herodian, and early Roman periods, indicating that the cave was used up until the Bar Kokhba revolt. A number of ossuaries and sarcophagi from the classical period with inscriptions in Hebrew, Aramaic, and Greek were also discovered at the vicinity of Jifna. One inscription includes the Hebrew words [--]lgh, which may refer to the priestly family Bilgah. Another inscription references "Yo'ezer the Scribe". The name Yo'ezer appears in first-century epitaphs from the Jerusalem necropolis and in Josephus as a priestly and aristocratic name.

The last evidence for Jewish presence in Gophna is a Greek-written marriage document that was found in a cave at Wadi Murabba'at in the Judaean Desert, and dates to 124 CE. Based on archeological evidence, it is believed that Jewish presence at the site ceased in the aftermath of the Bar Kokhba revolt.

It was suggested by Edward Robinson that Jifna was Ophni of Benjamin, mentioned in the Book of Joshua as one of the "twelve cities", later scholars, however, argue that Gophna was only founded during the Second Temple period.

=== Late Roman and Byzantine periods ===
Among the discoveries from the Late Roman period in Jifna are a Greek-language epitaph, a decorated sarcophagus with figures from Greek mythology (Erotes and Medusa), and another adorned sarcophagus, in the manner of Nablus, Sebaste, and the central coastal plain, possibly of Samaritan origin. Those epigraphic and artistic findings suggest that the site was then inhabited by pagans of Hellenistic or Roman culture. In the opinion of Eitan Klein, they demonstrate that after the Bar Kokhba revolt, the formerly Jewish settlement was resettled by high-class Roman citizens, possibly ex-soldiers or members of the Roman administration who were granted land in the village and its surroundings. It is unclear whether the Samaritan style sarcophagus was used by a Samaritan population who may have lived in the area during this period, or was used by pagans who purchased it from a workshop near Nablus.

The building of a church dedicated to Saint George during the 6th century indicates that by this time Jifna, now under Byzantine rule, had become a Christian town. Besides the church, other remains from this era are located in Jifna, including a Jewish tomb, a tower (Burj Jifna) once used by the Ottomans as a prison, a Roman villa, an olive oil press and a winery. Additionally, a funerary stone stele with a Greek inscription was found in the church area.

=== Middle Ages ===
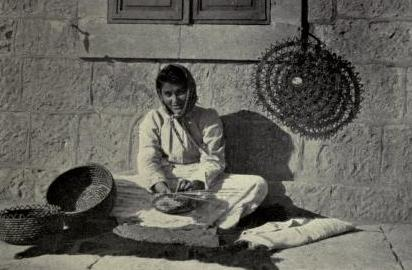
A woman in Jifna weaving in the traditional method, 1921

Jifna, along with most of Palestine, was annexed by the Rashidun Caliphate under Umar ibn al-Khattab after the Battle of Ajnadayn in 634. The town became less politically significant under the Arab dynasties of the Umayyads, Abbasids and Fatimids, but remained a major regional center for trade and commerce, due to its location along the Jerusalem–Nazareth road. It was known by the Arabs as Gafeniyyah.

Sources are vague, but it is likely that St. George's Church fell into disrepair during the early decades of Islamic rule, and that unfavorable circumstances for the Christian population prevented them from rebuilding it. However, it was partially rebuilt with old materials by the Crusaders, who conquered the area in 1099. The Crusaders built a large courtyard building in Jifna. It had a monumental gate with a portcullis, with a large vaulted hall and thick walls of fine masonry. After their defeat to the Ayyubids under Saladin in 1187, the church again fell into ruin. A document dated 1182 with the signature of one Raymundus de Jafenia, might indicate a Christian presence at this time. According to the American biblical scholar Edward Robinson, there are remains of massive walls in the center of the village, now filled by houses. They were relics of a castle built by the Crusaders. However, the masonry has no characteristics of the Crusader period; rather, the remains display the Arab architectural style of the post-Crusader period, most likely of the 18th century, judging by the dressing of the stones.

=== Ottoman era ===
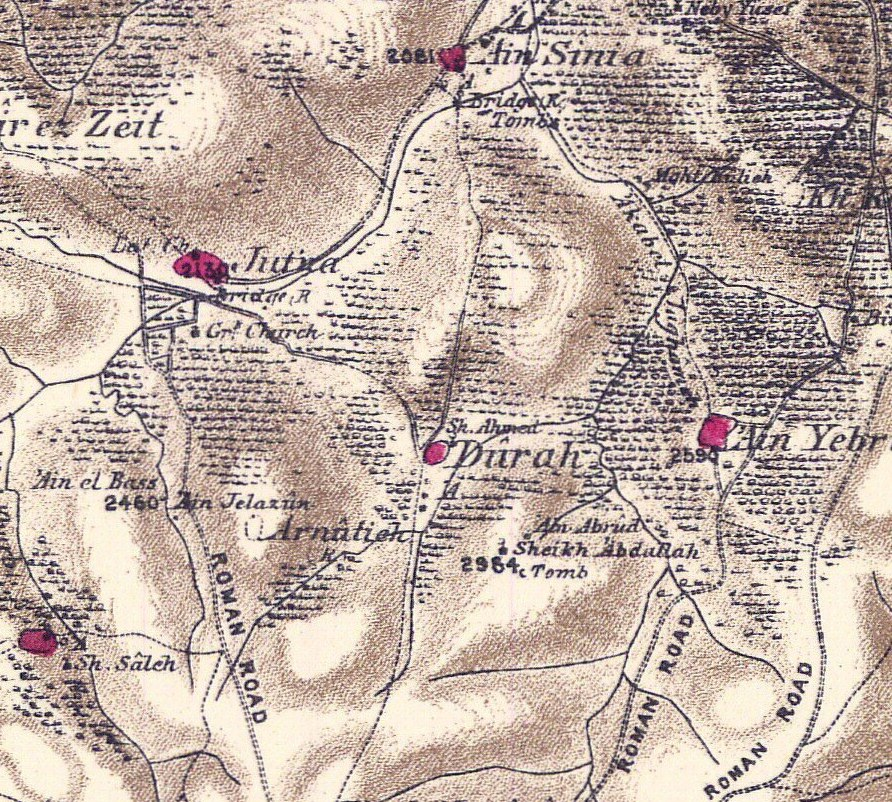
Jufna, misspelt Jutna, in the 1880s, in the PEF Survey of Palestine. The map marks the Greek Church, the Latin Church, and a bridge.

After the Crusaders were succeeded by the Ayyubids and then the Mamluks, the Ottoman Empire conquered Palestine in 1517, and Jifna came under their control for the following 400 years. In 1596 it appeared in the tax registers under the name of "Jifna an-Nasara", being in the nahiya (subdistrict) of Jerusalem of the Jerusalem Sanjak, with a population of 21 households. The villagers paid a fixed tax-rate of 33.3% on agricultural products, including wheat, barley, olive trees, vineyards, fruit trees, goats and beehives, in addition to occasional revenues; a total of 6,470 akçe. It was under the administration of the Bani Zeid subdistrict, part of the larger Jerusalem District, throughout Ottoman rule, being the only all-Christian village in the district. During this period, the main commodity of Jifna was olive oil. Ottoman activity in the village was minimal, but they used the remains of Jifna's castle, known as "Burj Jifna", as a jail house sometime during the 19th century. In the early 1830s, Ibrahim Pasha of Egypt conquered most of the Levant, including Palestine. In 1834 there was a revolt against the Egyptian authorities in the Jifna area; 26 residents of Jifna were subsequently exiled to Egypt for their alleged participation in the uprising. They were joined, voluntarily, by two prominent local priests.

An Eastern Orthodox Church was built in the village in 1858, and a larger Latin (Catholic) church dedicated to St. Joseph was built in 1859, adjacent to the ruins of St. George's Church. In the courtyard of St. George's Church is a sarcophagus. St. George's Church has continued to serve as a place of worship into the modern era and has been the site of archaeological excavation since the mid-19th century. Mass is still held at its altar on certain occasions.

In 1882 the PEF's Survey of Western Palestine described Jifna as an Important Christian village, with a Latin Church and a convent. Also in the 1880s, Jifna was frequently taxed by Ottoman authorities. It also came into consistent armed conflict with another Christian village, Bir Zeit, which in one incident, resulted in the deaths of five men from that village. In retaliation, residents of Bir Zeit uprooted and burned 125 of Jifna's olive groves.

=== Modern times ===
In 1917, during World War I, the Ottomans were defeated by British and Arab forces. After a brief period of military rule, Jifna and its region came under the control of the League of Nations British Mandate, in 1922. In 1947 the United Nations proposed the partitioning of Palestine into separate Jewish and Arab states, with Jifna being a part of the projected Arab state. However, after the 1948 Arab-Israeli War the whole West Bank region, including Jifna, was annexed by Transjordan to form the Kingdom of Jordan, and the Arab state was stillborn. After the Six-Day War in 1967, Jifna came under Israeli occupation.

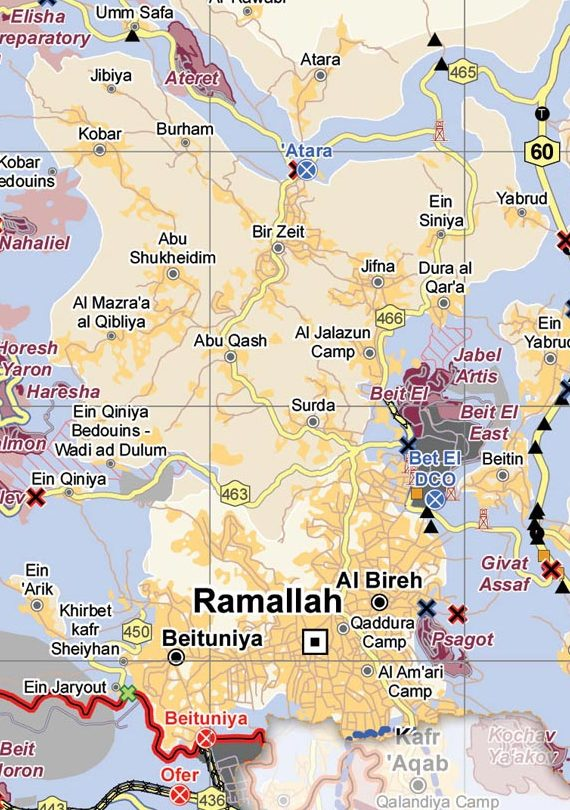
Jifna in the Ramallah "Island" in the 2018 OCHA OpT map

In 1995 the Interim Agreement on the West Bank and the Gaza Strip between the Palestinian National Authority (PNA) and Israel, Jifna was placed in "Area B". Thus, its administrative and civil affairs were transferred to the PNA, while security matters remained in Israeli control. Throughout the Second Intifada, Jifna did not experience violence to the same extent as other parts of the West Bank, such as in nearby Ramallah, although its residents did face travel restrictions and economic hardship.

On 31 July 2015 a 15-year-old resident was shot dead by an IDF sniper after allegedly throwing a firebomb at an army outpost. In April 2019, the village was attacked by a Fatah official and his gunmen, a number of whom made demands that the village's Christian residents pay the medieval jizya tax, in response to the police questioning of his son for allegedly assaulting a Christian woman from Jifna and her children. The incident did not result in casualties and was condemned by Palestinian government and church officials.

== Geography and climate ==
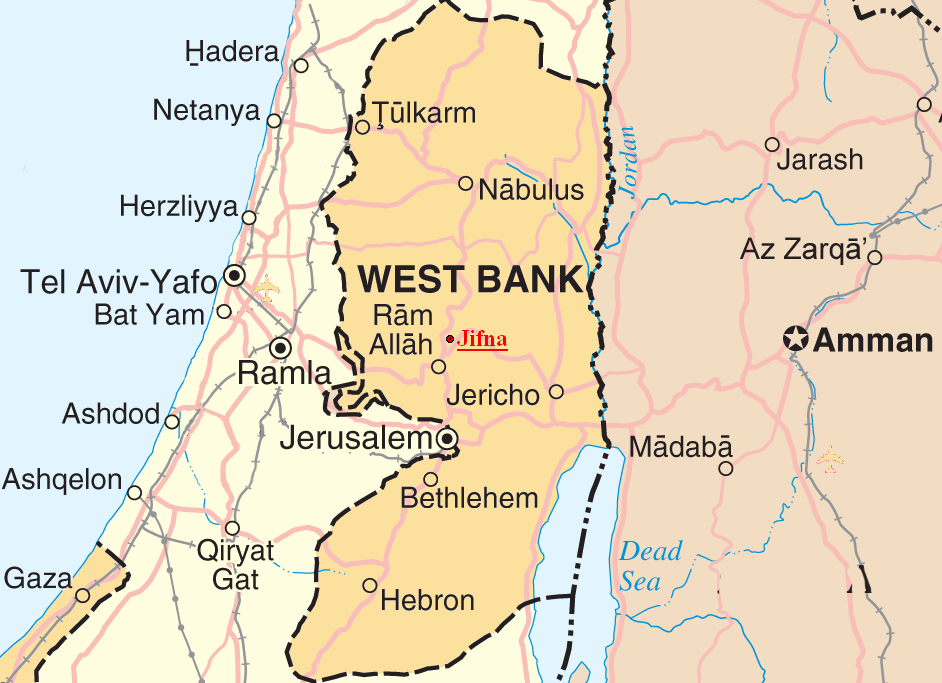
A map of the West Bank indicating Jifna's location

Jifna is located on the slope of a hill, standing at an elevation of about 661 meters (2,169 ft) above sea level. It is situated at the intersection of two ancient trade routes, the mountainous north–south route and the east–west route connecting the Jordan Valley with the Mediterranean seacoast. In 1945 its land area consisted of 5,939 dunams, 52 dunams of which were classified as built-up area in 1945. Today Jifna has a total jurisdiction over 6,015 dunams, 420 of which are designated as built-up and roughly 2,000 planted with olive, apricot and other fruit trees.

The village is located 8 kilometers (5.0 mi) northwest of Ramallah and al-Bireh and about 23 kilometers (14 mi) north of Jerusalem. The Palestinian refugee camp of Jalazone was built on Jifna's southern lands and is connected to the village by road. The villages of Dura al-Qar' and Ein Siniya are located adjacent to Jifna to the east and northeast respectively. Other nearby localities include Abu Qash to the southwest, Beitin to the southeast, Ein Yabrud to the east, 'Atara to the north and Bir Zeit to the northwest. Jifna is connected to the main Ramallah-Nablus highway by a road at the eastern side of the village.

Jifna experiences a temperate Mediterranean climate. Based on data for nearby Ramallah, average monthly high temperatures range from 53 °F (12 °C) in January to 84 °F (29 °C) in July/August, the corresponding lows being 39 °F (4 °C) and 63 °F (17 °C). Rain is usually restricted to the winter season, from around November until the end of April. The months that receive the most precipitation are January and December and the annual rainfall is 23.2 inches (590 mm).

== Demographics ==
Year	Population
1596	21 households
1838	200
1870	185 males
1896	576
1922	447
1927	550
1931	676
1945	910
1961	758
1995	649
1997	961
2007	1,716
2017	2,919

According to Edward Robinson, Jifna's population in 1838 consisted of about 200 people, of whom only 42 were adult males. An Ottoman village list from about 1870 found that Jifna had a population of 185 "Greeks", in a total of 56 houses, though that population count included men, only. In 1896 the population of Dschifna was estimated to be about 576 persons.

According to a census conducted in 1931 by the British Mandate authorities, Jifna had a population of 676 inhabitants, in 155 houses. In a 1945 land and population survey carried out by Sami Hadawi, Jifna had 910 inhabitants, 580 Christians and 330 Muslims. The modern inhabitants of Jifna belong mainly to eight families, four of whom are originally from the village, while the other five have, at various times, migrated from other countries such as Syria.

In 1994, Jifna experienced a wave of emigration, with about half of its population leaving the town to pursue better livelihoods elsewhere. The first census carried out by the Palestinian Central Bureau of Statistics (PCBS) shows that Jifna had a population of 961, of whom 623 (64.8%) were classified as refugees in 1997. The gender distribution was 465 males (48.4%) and 494 females (51.6%). The age distribution was: Under 15, 330 (34%); 15–29, 275 (29%); 30–65, 304 (32%); Over 65, 50 (5%).

The population of Jifna continues to grow. According to the PCBS, Jifna's mid-year population estimate for 2006 was 1,358. An informal estimate from Autumn 2006 gives the population as 1,500, "25% of whom have had to move to Jerusalem or Ramallah to find jobs". The 2007 census by the PCBS listed Jifna's population as 1,716, of which 856 were males and 860 females. The village had a population of 2,919 in 2017.

=== Religion ===
The remains of the Byzantine-era church in Jifna testifies to the existence of a Christian community prior to the Muslim conquest. It continued to exist during the Middle Ages and the village is still inhabited mainly by Christians. The names of Christian inhabitants from Jifna appeared in a 10th-century inscription on a stone above the gate of St. George's Monastery in the Wadi Qelt.

Ottoman tax records from the late 16th century reveal that Jifna had a Christian population at the time also. An informal survey in 1927 found 550 inhabitants, of whom 325 were Catholics and the remainder reportedly "Christians of other denominations". Palestinian Christians make up about 80% of the residents, while the remaining 20% are Muslims, mostly refugees.

It is certain that most of the Christian residents of Jifna in the 12th century were local inhabitants. Apart from local Christians there was also a Frankish settlement, as is attested by the ruins of a maison forte (manor) built in the lower part of the village. In Jifna, like in many other sites in Palestine, the Crusaders built their settlement in the heart of the local Christian settlement.

== Economy ==
Although most of Jifna's cultivable land is covered with olive groves as well as fig, walnut and apricot trees and grape vines, agriculture is no longer the village's main source of income. Many of the village's former farmers are living off other businesses, including restaurants, other small family-owned industries, and simple commerce.

Unlike some other West Bank localities, unemployment is a minor issue in Jifna. However, the average income is low because of the unstable political situation in the Palestinian territories, Israeli checkpoints, the West Bank barrier and the 2006 freezing by Israel of funds to the Palestinian territories—although the latter no longer applies to the West Bank.

According to the PCBS, 98.5% of Jifna's 201 households are connected to electricity through a public network. The same percentage is connected to a sewage system, mostly through a cesspit. Pipe water is provided for 98% of the households primarily through a public network (97.5%), but some residents receive water through a private system (1.5%). The village is home to the Jifna Women's Charitable Society which offers health services and recreational activities for women and children.

=== Small businesses ===
There are three restaurants in Jifna: Al-Burj Restaurant, Red Valley Restaurant and Garden, and Tabash Restaurant, as well as a hotel: al-Murouj Pension. In 2003, the Odeh family of Jifna opened a leisure complex—called the Dream Day Resort—in the village. The complex, containing a half-Olympic-size swimming pool, a children's pool and a jacuzzi is frequented by residents in Jifna and the surrounding area.

Al-Burj Restaurant—also known as "Burj Jifna"—specializes in Palestinian cuisine and contains a café and a Palestinian culture hall. Situated in the center of the village, the restaurant is the site of Jifna's old city. With international funding, the local youth club restored the area, adding bright accents to the stone masonry. The restaurant has become a center of tourism and the complex provides tours for its rooms, olive oil presses and ancient ramparts. Tabash Restaurant was founded in 1962 by a Palestinian refugee family from Jaffa. Initially known as al-Wadi Bar, it received its current name in 1972. The owners and the employees of the restaurant are from the Tabash family.

== Culture ==
=== Traditions ===
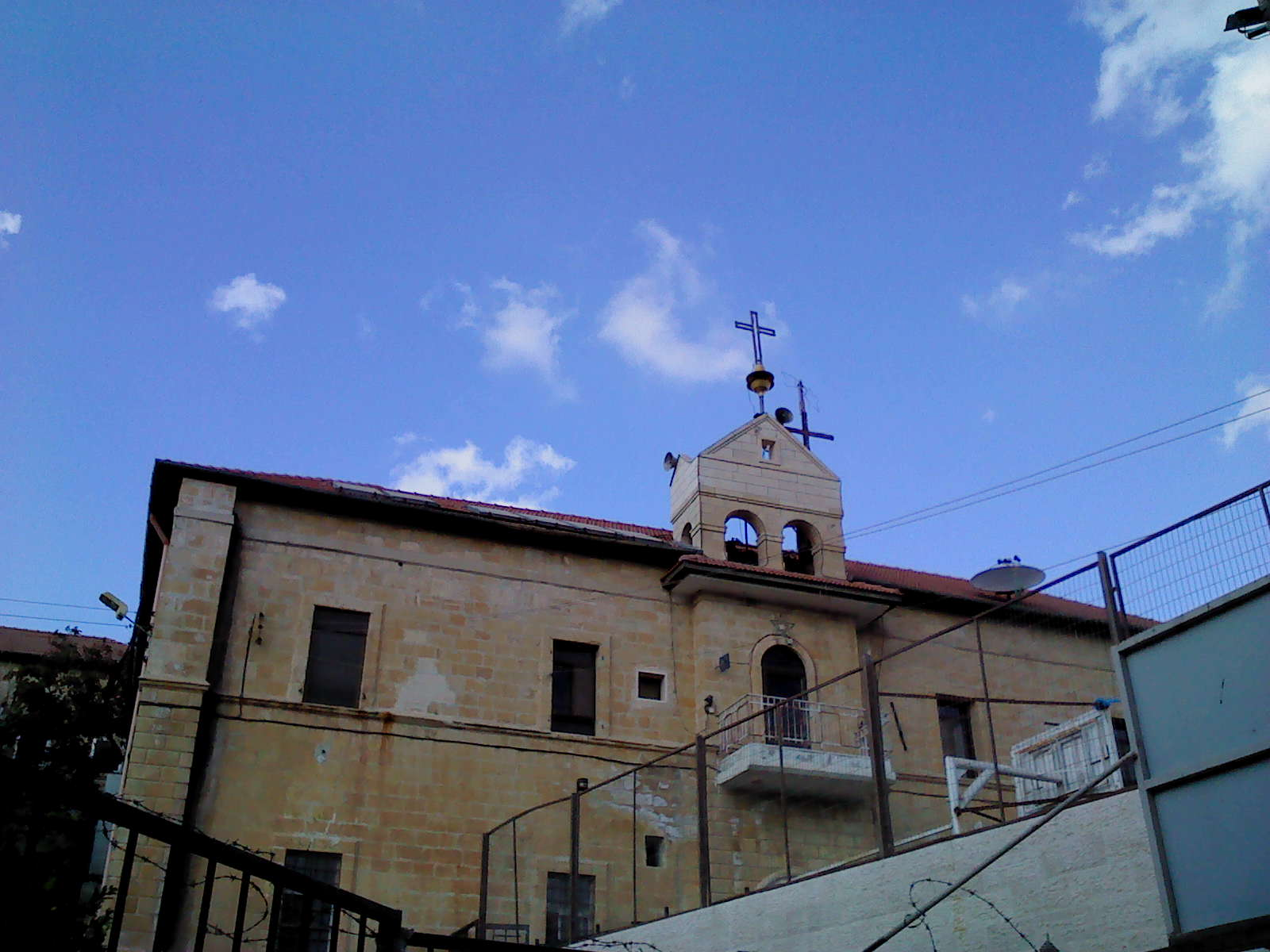
A church in Jifna, 2012

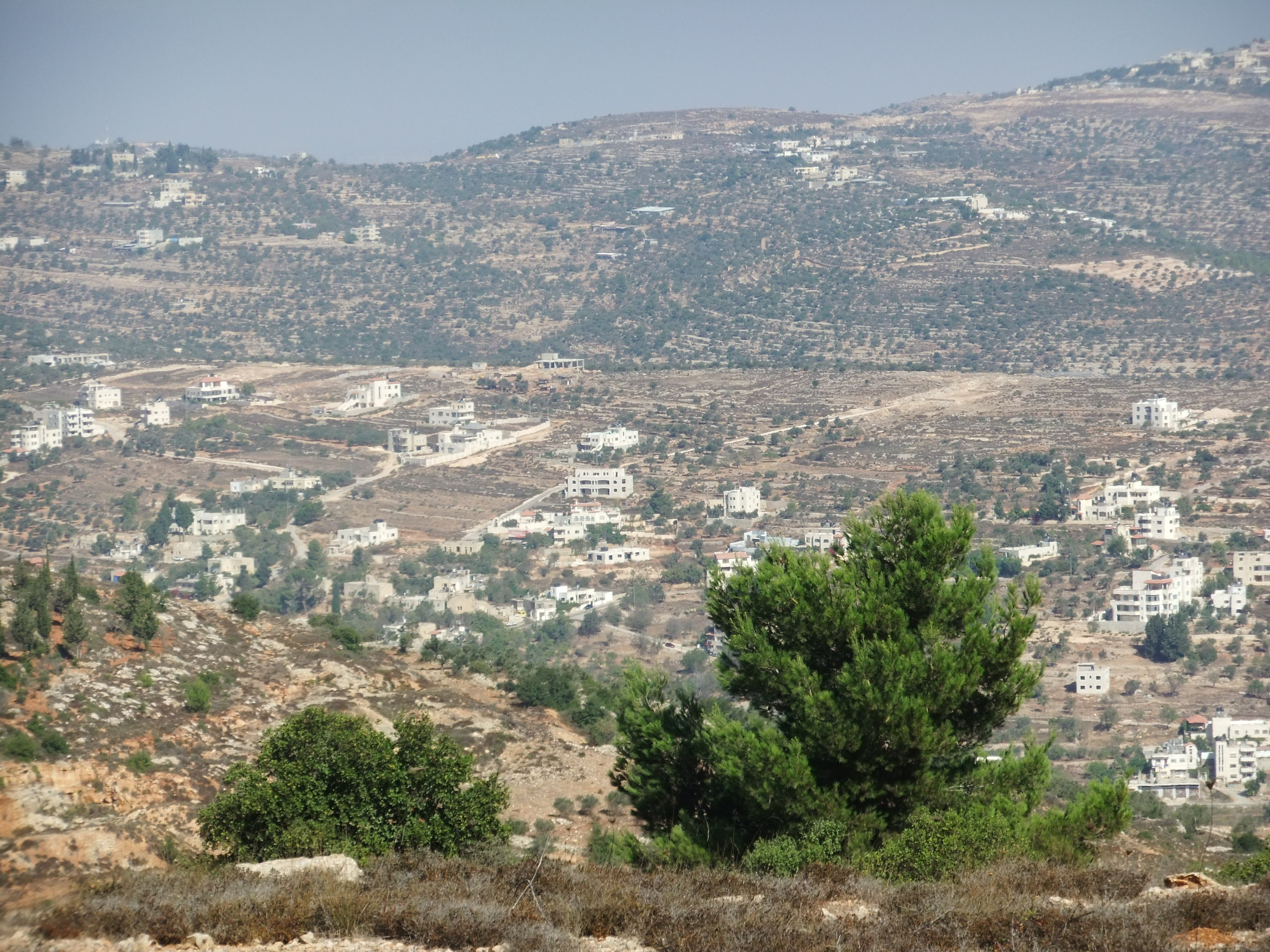
Western part of Jifna

There are a number of local traditions in Jifna. A prominent legend among Jifna's inhabitants is that the Holy Family rested near an oak tree in the town on their way from Jerusalem. The legend's origins are due to Jifna's location along the ancient Jerusalem-Nazareth road.

A nearby mountain was named Jabal ad-Dik ("Mount of the Rooster") because of a traditional story. According to the tradition, a Jew that lived in Jifna had visited Jerusalem during the Passion. Seeing Jesus rise from the dead, the man immediately converted and told his wife what he saw. His wife refused to believe him unless the rooster she had just killed would come back to life. Instantly, the rooster flew away towards the mountain. The story was recited in some monasteries on Holy Thursday together with other biblical readings.

A legend exists about Jifna's spring—which the village has used for centuries—concerning how it periodically runs low on water. Popular belief is that this is the work of the djinniye (female spirit). According to Palestinian researcher Tawfiq Canaan, "In Jifna the priest has to go on such an occasions to the dry spring to repeat prayers and burn incense, and thus reconcile the djinniye or force her to let the water flow".

Like many Palestinian villages, the women of Jifna have their own traditional dress. Costumes in the village, known as rumi abyad ("Greek White") and rumi aswad ("Greek Black"), were dresses of hand-woven linen embroidered with the Jifna's own motifs. Preparing burbara, a sweet pudding-like dish made from whole grain wheat, on the Feast of Saint Barbara has been a tradition in Jifna for several centuries.

=== Festivals ===
In April–May 2005 Jifna hosted the first annual International Artists' Workshop in Palestine. The festival, known as the "Jifna Spring" was the first held in a rural village instead of a major city such as Hebron or Ramallah. During the festival, dozens of artists from all over the world collaborated on several projects, including stone sculptures, metalwork, photography, mural paintings and installation pieces. Many of the works were influenced by the "specificity and qualities" of Jifna, while others dealt with the subject of Palestinian identity.

Jifna, locally famous for its apricot harvest, hosts an annual two-day apricot festival in the first week of May. Hundreds of West Bankers flock to participate in the harvest. The festival is also used by Palestinian politicians as an opportunity to give speeches praising Palestinian farmers and encouraging boycotts on Israeli products and reliance on domestic agriculture.

== Local government ==
Jifna is governed by a village council consisting of ten members including the chairman. The council was founded in 1954, when a prominent resident, Nasri Ilias Samara, pressured the Jordanian authorities to recognize the institution, even though a village was normally required to have a population of at least 1,000 inhabitants for permission to establish a village council. The decision was approved by Jordan's then prime minister. Representatives from Jifna's largest families formed the original council's body, appointing Smara as chairman and Salim Issa Musleh as vice chairman. Jabi Na'im Kamil was elected as the chairman in 2005 and the Badil (Alternative) list—which represents a leftist alliance of the Democratic Front for the Liberation of Palestine and the Palestinian People's Party—won most of the council seats.

== Education ==
Jifna contains one gender-mixed primary school and kindergarten, founded by the Latin Patriarchate of Jerusalem in 1856 and managed by Jifna's Catholic church. The school's staff comprises eight teachers and two nuns, as well as four teachers for the kindergarten. Students who have graduated from the school commute to Ramallah or Bir Zeit daily for their secondary and tertiary education. Most university students attend the nearby Bir Zeit University.

== See also ==
- Abeer Odeh
- Alex Odeh
- Palestinian Christians
- Arab Christian
- History of Palestine

== Bibliography ==
- Barron, J.B., ed. (1923). Palestine: Report and General Abstracts of the Census of 1922. Government of Palestine.
- Boas, Adrian (1999). Crusader Archaeology: The Material Culture of the Latin East. Routledge. ISBN 0-415-17361-2.
- Canaan, T. (1922). Haunted Springs and Water Demons in Palestine. Jerusalem: Palestine Oriental Society.
- Conder, C.R.; Kitchener, H.H. (1882). The Survey of Western Palestine: Memoirs of the Topography, Orography, Hydrography, and Archaeology. Vol. 2. London: Committee of the Palestine Exploration Fund.
- Conder, C.R.; Kitchener, H.H. (1883). The Survey of Western Palestine: Memoirs of the Topography, Orography, Hydrography, and Archaeology. Vol. 3. London: Committee of the Palestine Exploration Fund.
- Chase, Kenneth (2003). Firearms: A Global History to 1700. Cambridge University Press. ISBN 0-521-82274-2.
- Dauphin, C. (1998). La Palestine byzantine, Peuplement et Populations. BAR International Series 726 (in French). Vol. III : Catalogue. Oxford: Archeopress. ISBN 0-860549-05-4.
- Donner, Herbert Kampen (1992). The Mosaic Map of Madaba. Peeters Publishers. ISBN 90-390-0011-5.
- Durward, John T (1913). Holy Land and Holy Writ. Pilgrim Pub and Co.
- Ellenblum, R. (2003). Frankish Rural Settlement in the Latin Kingdom of Jerusalem. Cambridge University Press. ISBN 9780521521871.
- Finkelstein, I.; Lederman, Zvi, eds. (1997). Highlands of many cultures. Tel Aviv: Institute of Archaeology of Tel Aviv University Publications Section. ISBN 965-440-007-3. (II, pp. 543– 547)
- Gil, M. (1997). A History of Palestine, 634–1099. Cambridge University Press. ISBN 0-521-59984-9.
- Goodrich-Freer, A. (1905). In a Syrian Saddle. Methuen and Co.
- Government of Jordan, Department of Statistics (1964). First Census of Population and Housing. Volume I: Final Tables; General Characteristics of the Population (PDF).
- Government of Palestine, Department of Statistics (1945). Village Statistics, April, 1945.
- Guérin, V. (1869). Description Géographique Historique et Archéologique de la Palestine (in French). Vol. 1: Judee, pt. 3. Paris: L'Imprimerie Nationale. (p. 28 −32)
- Guérin, V. (1875). Description Géographique Historique et Archéologique de la Palestine (in French). Vol. 2: Samarie, pt. 2. Paris: L'Imprimerie Nationale. (p. 39 )
- Hadawi, S. (1970). Village Statistics of 1945: A Classification of Land and Area ownership in Palestine. Palestine Liberation Organization Research Centre.
- Hartmann, M. (1883). "Die Ortschaftenliste des Liwa Jerusalem in dem türkischen Staatskalender für Syrien auf das Jahr 1288 der Flucht (1871)". Zeitschrift des Deutschen Palästina-Vereins. 6: 102–149.
- Hütteroth, W.-D.; Abdulfattah, K. (1977). Historical Geography of Palestine, Transjordan and Southern Syria in the Late 16th Century. Erlanger Geographische Arbeiten, Sonderband 5. Erlangen, Germany: Vorstand der Fränkischen Geographischen Gesellschaft. ISBN 3-920405-41-2.
- Kramer, G.; Harman, Graham (2008). A History of Palestine: from the Ottoman Conquest to the Founding of the State of Israel. Princeton University Press. ISBN 978-0-691-11897-0.
- Liévin de Hamme (1876). Guide-indicateur des sanctuaires et lieux historiques de la Terre -Sainte. Venice: F.et J. Lefever.
- Mills, E., ed. (1932). Census of Palestine 1931. Population of Villages, Towns and Administrative Areas. Jerusalem: Government of Palestine.
- Oliphant, L. (1881). The Land of Gilead: With Excursions in the Lebanon. D. Appleton.
- Palmer, E.H. (1881). The Survey of Western Palestine: Arabic and English Name Lists Collected During the Survey by Lieutenants Conder and Kitchener, R. E. Transliterated and Explained by E.H. Palmer. Committee of the Palestine Exploration Fund.
- Pringle, D. (1993). The Churches of the Crusader Kingdom of Jerusalem: A-K (excluding Acre and Jerusalem). Vol. 1. Cambridge University Press. ISBN 9780521390361. (pp. 279 - 280)
- Pringle, D. (1997). Secular buildings in the Crusader Kingdom of Jerusalem: an archaeological Gazetter. Cambridge University Press. ISBN 9780521460101. (p. 57)
- Robinson, E. (1860). Biblical Researches in Palestine, and in the Adjacent Regions. Crocker and Brewster. p. 263. "Jufna Palestine."
- Robinson, E.; Smith, E. (1841). Biblical Researches in Palestine, Mount Sinai and Arabia Petraea: A Journal of Travels in the year 1838. Vol. 3. Boston: Crocker & Brewster.
- Röhricht, R. (1893). Regista Regni Hierosolymitani (1097–1291). Oeniponti : Libraria Academica Wagneriana.
- Schick, C. (1896). "Zur Einwohnerzahl des Bezirks Jerusalem". Zeitschrift des Deutschen Palästina-Vereins. 19: 120–127.
- Singer, A. (1994). Palestinian Peasants and Ottoman Officials: Rural Administration Around Sixteenth-Century Jerusalem. Cambridge University Press. ISBN 0-521-47679-8.
- Socin, A. (1879). "Alphabetisches Verzeichniss von Ortschaften des Paschalik Jerusalem". Zeitschrift des Deutschen Palästina-Vereins. 2: 135–163.
- Toledano, E. (1984). "The Sanjaq of Jerusalem in the Sixteenth Century: Aspects of Topography and Population". Archivum Ottomanicum. 9: 279–319. Archived from the original on 2016-03-05.
- van de Velde, C.W.M. (1858). Memoir to Accompany the Map of the Holy Land. Gotha: Justus Perthes.
