= Regulation Law =

Israeli law

The Judea and Samaria Settlement Regulation Law (Hebrew: חוק להסדרת ההתיישבות ביהודה והשומרון), commonly known as the Regulation Law (Hebrew: חוק ההסדרה) or sometimes the Regularization Law, is an Israeli law that aims to retroactively legalize Israeli settlements in the West Bank Area C under the Oslo Accords. It is meant to "regulate" the status of about 2,000 to 4,000 residences in 16 settlements which were built on Palestinian-owned lands. The Knesset passed the legislation 60 to 52, on February 6, 2017. According to the law, the land on which the residences are built will remain that of the legal owners, but their usage will be expropriated by the State. In exchange, the Palestinian owners will be compensated at a rate of 125%, or receive alternate lands (whenever possible). The law is known by some of its critics as the "Expropriation Law" (Hebrew: חוק ההפקעה) due to its land expropriation components. The Israeli occupation of the West Bank is considered a breach of international law, though Israel disputes this.

On 9 June 2020, the Supreme Court of Israel revoked the law, ordering the government to cancel its implementation.

== Background ==
During the last decade of the 20th century and at the beginning of the 21st century, a number of outposts as well as neighborhoods in established settlements, were built in areas that are listed in the Judea and Samaria land registration as lands privately owned by Palestinians. At the beginning of the 21st century, several of these Palestinian owners petitioned the Supreme Court of Israel, claiming those residencies were built on their own private land. In some of these instances, the Court acknowledged their property rights and directed to demolish houses, such as: at a neighborhood in Beit El, at the Amona outpost, nine houses in Ofra, and more. Great efforts by the government to prevent these demolitions resulted in some of the proceeding extending over the course of years, but did not end up halting the demolitions. To prevent this from reoccurring, MPs of parties from the right drafted legislation that would prevent such judicial rulings of demolition of houses in the settlements of Judea and Samaria.

== Supreme Court challenge ==
On February 8, 2017, the law was brought before the Supreme Court of Israel by 17 Palestinian local governments and three human rights organizations. Attorney General of Israel Avichai Mandelblit has announced that he will not be defending the law on behalf of the government at the Supreme Court because he deems it unconstitutional, and that it may lead to a suit against Israel at the International Criminal Court. Israeli Justice Minister Ayelet Shaked, whose party The Jewish Home was behind the legislation, responded by saying that the State plans to hire a private lawyer to represent it.

== International reactions ==
Speaking for the Palestinian National Authority, Palestinian President Mahmoud Abbas has termed the law "an aggression against our people". The law has also been criticized internationally, including by allies of Israel. UN envoy for the Middle East peace process Nickolay Mladenov said the law "crosses a very thick red line." EU foreign policy chief Federica Mogherini stated that: "The European Union condemns the recent adoption of the 'Regularisation Law'", adding that it "crosses a new and dangerous threshold by legalizing under Israeli law the seizure of Palestinian property rights". Tobias Ellwood UK Minister for the Middle East and Africa had said that: "As a longstanding friend of Israel, I condemn the passing of the Land Regularisation Bill by the Knesset, which damages Israel’s standing with its international partners." The German Foreign Ministry stated that its "trust in the Israeli government’s commitment to the two-state solution” had been "fundamentally shaken". As well, French Ambassador to Israel, Hélène Le Gal, said that the law brought Israel to "a path which is not leading to peace".

== See also ==
- Israeli land and property laws
- Status of territories captured by Israel
- Palestinian territories
- Israeli-occupied territories
