= Ein Siniya =

- Local Development Committee

Arabic transcription(s)
  - Arabic: عين سينيا
  - Latin: 'Ayn Sinya (official); Ayn Siniya (unofficial)
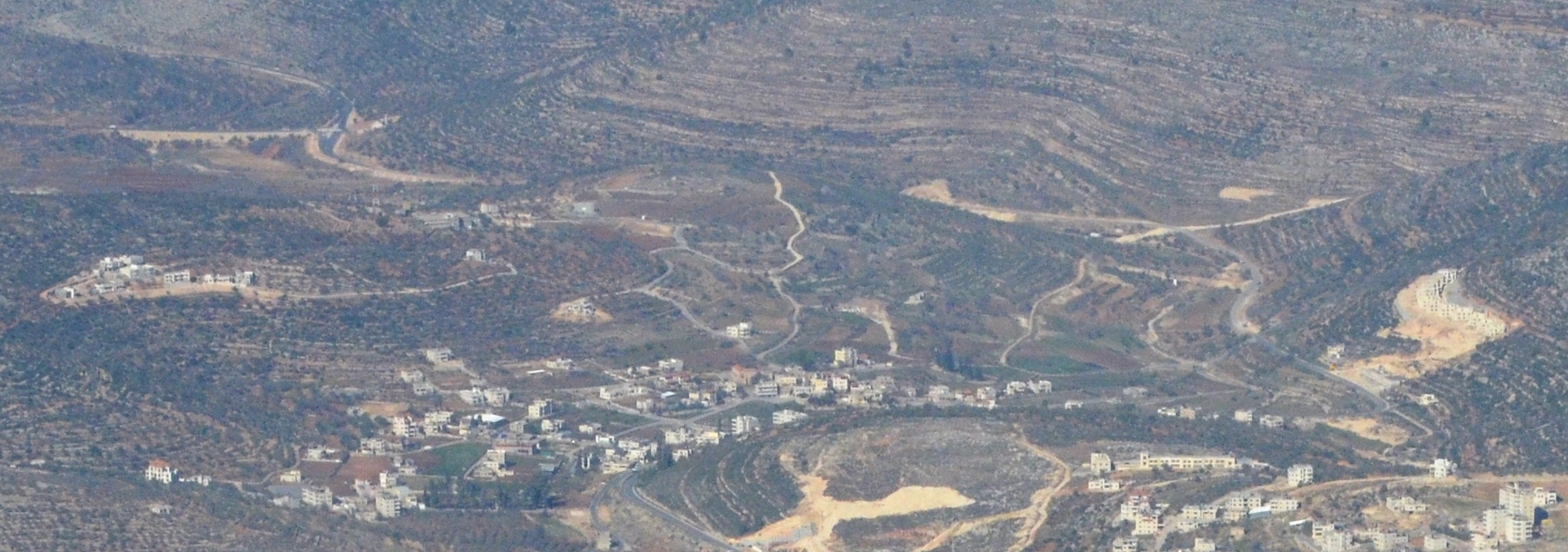
- Ein Siniya from the south

- Location of Ein Siniya within Palestine
- Coordinates: 31°58′21″N 35°13′47″E
- Palestine grid: 171/153
- State: State of Palestine
- Governorate: Ramallah and al-Bireh

Government
  - Type: Local Development Committee

Area (1945)
  - Total: 2.4 km^{2} (0.93 sq mi)

Population (2017)
  - Total: 925
  - Density: 390/km^{2} (1,000/sq mi)
- Name meaning: "The spring of Sinya"

Ein Siniya (Arabic: عين سينيا, ‘Ayn Sîniyâ) is a small Palestinian village in the Ramallah and al-Bireh Governorate, 10 kilometers (6.2 mi) north of Ramallah, and approximately 1km northeast from Jifna. It lies in a valley surrounded with olive and fig-terraces.

== Location ==
'Ein Siniya is located (horizontally) 8km east of Ramallah. It is bordered by Yabrud and Ein Yabrud to the east, 'Atara and Silwad to the north, Jifna and Birzeit to the west, and Jifna and Dura al-Qar' to the south.

== History ==
=== Antiquity ===
Numerous rock-cut tombs have been found around the village.

Clermont-Ganneau identified Ein Siniya with Biblical Jeshanah and Isana of Josephus, but modern authors place that at Kh. el-Burn. In 1872, a rock-cut tomb with a Hebrew inscription was found in the village, and Clermont-Ganneau later deciphered its beginning as "Hananiah, son of Eleazar, son of...".

Ein Siniya has usually been identified as the Crusader village Aineseins, which was one of 21 villages given by King Godfrey as a fief to the canons of the Holy Sepulchre. However, C. N. Johns, writing in 1939, thought that Aineseins was located by Tel Beit Shemesh.

Claude Reignier Conder and Herbert Kitchener wrote in 1882 that a small Crusader fort appeared to have been situated there, however, this has not been verified by later sources. Additionally, Conder and Kitchener mention the tomb with a Hebrew inscription that was discovered at the location, as well as a gateway adorned door that they thought was of Arab Christian origin.

=== Ottoman era ===
During Palestine's rule by the Ottoman Empire (16th-19th centuries), Ein Siniya was located in the sheikhdom of Bani Zeid, in the Jerusalem Sanjak. In 1556, it was the smallest village in the sheikhdom, having under ten households. Potsherds from the early Ottoman period have been found. In the Ottoman census of 1596, Ein Siniya was a part of the nahiya ("subdistrict") of Jerusalem, which was under the administration of the Jerusalem Sanjak. The village had a population of 12 households, all Muslim, and paid taxes on wheat, barley, olives, vineyards, fruit trees, occasional revenues, beehives and/or goats; a total of 4,300 akçe.

Prior to the 1834 peasants' revolt, Ein Siniya belonged to the Bani Murrah tribe. After the revolt, the sheikhs were appointed by Ibrahim Pasha. In 1838, Biblical scholar Edward Robinson found the village to be surrounded with vineyards and fruit-trees. There were also gardens of vegetables, watered from a well. It was further noted as Muslim village, located in the Beni Murrah district, north of Jerusalem.

In 1870, the French explorer Victor Guérin visited the village, which he found to have two hundred inhabitants. Socin found from an official Ottoman village list from about the same year (1870) that Ein Siniya had 57 houses and a population of 218, though the population count included men only.

In 1882, the PEF's Survey of Western Palestine described Ain Sinia as a small village, but of "undoubted antiquity." Early in the 20th century, Ain Sinya was "practically" the property of a wealthy Arab native of Jerusalem who influenced authorities to build a carriage road next to Ein Siniya to benefit the village. In 1907 the population was Muslim. At the same time it was noted that Ein Siniya, unlike other Arab villages in the area, grew mulberry and walnut trees in abundance instead of olive or fig groves.

In 1896 the population of 'Ain Sinja was estimated to be about 237 persons.

Moshe Sharett, later Prime Minister of Israel, lived in Ein Siniya for two years, in 1906-1908, after the family's immigration from Ukraine. During this period, Sharett's father and two uncles ran a farmstead which included an olive-oil press and a flour mill.

=== British Mandate era ===
In the 1922 census of Palestine, conducted by the British Mandate authorities, the population numbered 114, Muslims, increasing in the 1931 census to 288, in 59 inhabited houses. 15 villagers were Christian, the rest Muslim.

In 1945 statistics Ein Siniya had a population of 330 inhabitants; 310 Muslims and 20 Christians, and a total land area of 2,724 dunams, most of which was Arab-owned. Its built-up area consisted of 21 dunams, while 2,404 dunams were cultivated. 1,856 dunams were allocated for plantations and irrigable land, and 548 for cereals.

=== Jordanian era ===
In the wake of the 1948 Arab–Israeli War, and after the 1949 Armistice Agreements, Ein Siniya came under Jordanian rule.

The Jordanian census of 1961 found 431 inhabitants.

=== Post-1967 ===
Since the Six-Day War in 1967, Ein Siniya has been under Israeli occupation.

After the 1995 accords, 2,578 dunum of village land is defined as Area B land, while the remaining 618 dunum is defined as Area C.

Much of the population fled during the war and only by 1982 did the population reach roughly what it was in 1945, 333. It grew to 482 in 1987, and then 533 in the census carried out by the Palestinian Central Bureau of Statistics (PCBS) a decade later. The main cause of the growth of Ein Siniya, which was nearly empty after the 1967 war, was an influx of Palestinian refugees, who by 1997 constituted over half of the population (52.3%). According to the PCBS, Ein Siniya had a population of 702 in 2004, rising to 753 in mid-year 2006. In the 2007 PCBS census, there were 711 people living in the town. By 2017, the population was 925. In January 2026, herders were expelled from traditional grazing areas and displaced to Dura al-Qar' following daily harassment by settlers.

== Demography ==
'Ein Siniya residents are from several families, mainly the Samaha, Ghanimah, Abu Al-Sheikh, Samhan, Ma'alla, Khater, Abu al Hajj, Dar Ali, Bazrooq, Mousa and Al Hallaq families ('Ein Siniya Village Council, 2011).

== Bibliography ==
- Amiry, S., Nazmi Al-Jubeh, Andrea Bräuning, Jürgen Frick: Das „Museum of Memory” in Ain Sinya. Beispiel für die Denkmalpflege in Palästina. In: Denkmalpflege in Baden-Württemberg, 32 (2003), vol. 4, pp. 345–353 (PDF)
- Barron, J.B., ed. (1923). Palestine: Report and General Abstracts of the Census of 1922. Government of Palestine.
- Clermont-Ganneau, C.S. (1896). [ARP] Archaeological Researches in Palestine 1873-1874, translated from the French by J. McFarlane. Vol. 2. London: Palestine Exploration Fund.
- Conder, C.R.; Kitchener, H.H. (1882). The Survey of Western Palestine: Memoirs of the Topography, Orography, Hydrography, and Archaeology. Vol. 2. London: Committee of the Palestine Exploration Fund.
- Conder, C.R.; Kitchener, H.H. (1883). The Survey of Western Palestine: Memoirs of the Topography, Orography, Hydrography, and Archaeology. Vol. 3. London: Committee of the Palestine Exploration Fund.
- Finkelstein, I.; Lederman, Zvi, eds. (1997). Highlands of many cultures. Tel Aviv: Institute of Archaeology of Tel Aviv University Publications Section. ISBN 965-440-007-3.
- Government of Jordan, Department of Statistics (1964). First Census of Population and Housing. Volume I: Final Tables; General Characteristics of the Population (PDF).
- Government of Palestine, Department of Statistics (1945). Village Statistics, April, 1945.
- Grant, E. (1921). The People of Palestine. Philadelphia: Lippincott.
- Guérin, V. (1875). Description Géographique Historique et Archéologique de la Palestine (in French). Vol. 2: Samarie, pt. 2. Paris: L'Imprimerie Nationale.
- Hadawi, S. (1970). Village Statistics of 1945: A Classification of Land and Area ownership in Palestine. Palestine Liberation Organization Research Centre.
- Hartmann, M. (1883). "Die Ortschaftenliste des Liwa Jerusalem in dem türkischen Staatskalender für Syrien auf das Jahr 1288 der Flucht (1871)". Zeitschrift des Deutschen Palästina-Vereins. 6: 102–149.
- Hütteroth, W.-D.; Abdulfattah, K. (1977). Historical Geography of Palestine, Transjordan and Southern Syria in the Late 16th Century. Erlanger Geographische Arbeiten, Sonderband 5. Erlangen, Germany: Vorstand der Fränkischen Geographischen Gesellschaft. ISBN 3-920405-41-2.
- Macalister, R.A.S.; Masterman, E.W.G. (1905). "Occasional Papers on the Modern inhabitants of Palestine, part I & part II" (PDF). Quarterly Statement - Palestine Exploration Fund. 37: 343–356. doi:10.1179/peq.1905.37.4.343.
- Mills, E., ed. (1932). Census of Palestine 1931. Population of Villages, Towns and Administrative Areas. Jerusalem: Government of Palestine.
- Palmer, E.H. (1881). The Survey of Western Palestine: Arabic and English Name Lists Collected During the Survey by Lieutenants Conder and Kitchener, R. E. Transliterated and Explained by E.H. Palmer. Committee of the Palestine Exploration Fund.
- Pringle, D. (1997). Secular buildings in the Crusader Kingdom of Jerusalem: an archaeological Gazetter. Cambridge University Press. ISBN 9780521460101.
- Rey, E.G. (1883). Les colonies franques de Syrie aux XIIme et XIIIme siècles (in French). Paris: A. Picard.
- Robinson, E.; Smith, E. (1841). Biblical Researches in Palestine, Mount Sinai and Arabia Petraea: A Journal of Travels in the year 1838. Vol. 3. Boston: Crocker & Brewster.
- Röhricht, R. (1887). "Studien zur mittelalterlichen Geographie und Topographie Syriens". Zeitschrift des Deutschen Palästina-Vereins. 10: 195–344.
- Röhricht, R. (1893). (RRH) Regesta regni Hierosolymitani (MXCVII-MCCXCI) (in Latin). Berlin: Libraria Academica Wageriana.
- de Roziére, E., ed. (1849). Cartulaire de l'église du Saint Sépulchre de Jérusalem: publié d'après les manuscrits du Vatican (in Latin and French). Paris: Imprimerie nationale.
- Schick, C. (1896). "Zur Einwohnerzahl des Bezirks Jerusalem". Zeitschrift des Deutschen Palästina-Vereins. 19: 120–127.
- Singer, A. (1994). Palestinian Peasants and Ottoman Officials: Rural Administration Around Sixteenth-Century Jerusalem. Cambridge University Press. ISBN 0-521-47679-8.
- Socin, A. (1879). "Alphabetisches Verzeichniss von Ortschaften des Paschalik Jerusalem". Zeitschrift des Deutschen Palästina-Vereins. 2: 135–163.
