= Yabrud =

Yabrud may refer to:

- Yabroud a city in Syria
- Yabrud, Ramallah, a Palestinian village in the Ramallah and al-Bireh Governorate
