= Dura al-Qar' =

- Municipality type D (Village council)

Arabic transcription(s)
  - Arabic: دورا القرع
  - Latin: Dura al-Qari' (official); Dura al-Qari'a or Dura al-Qara (unofficial)
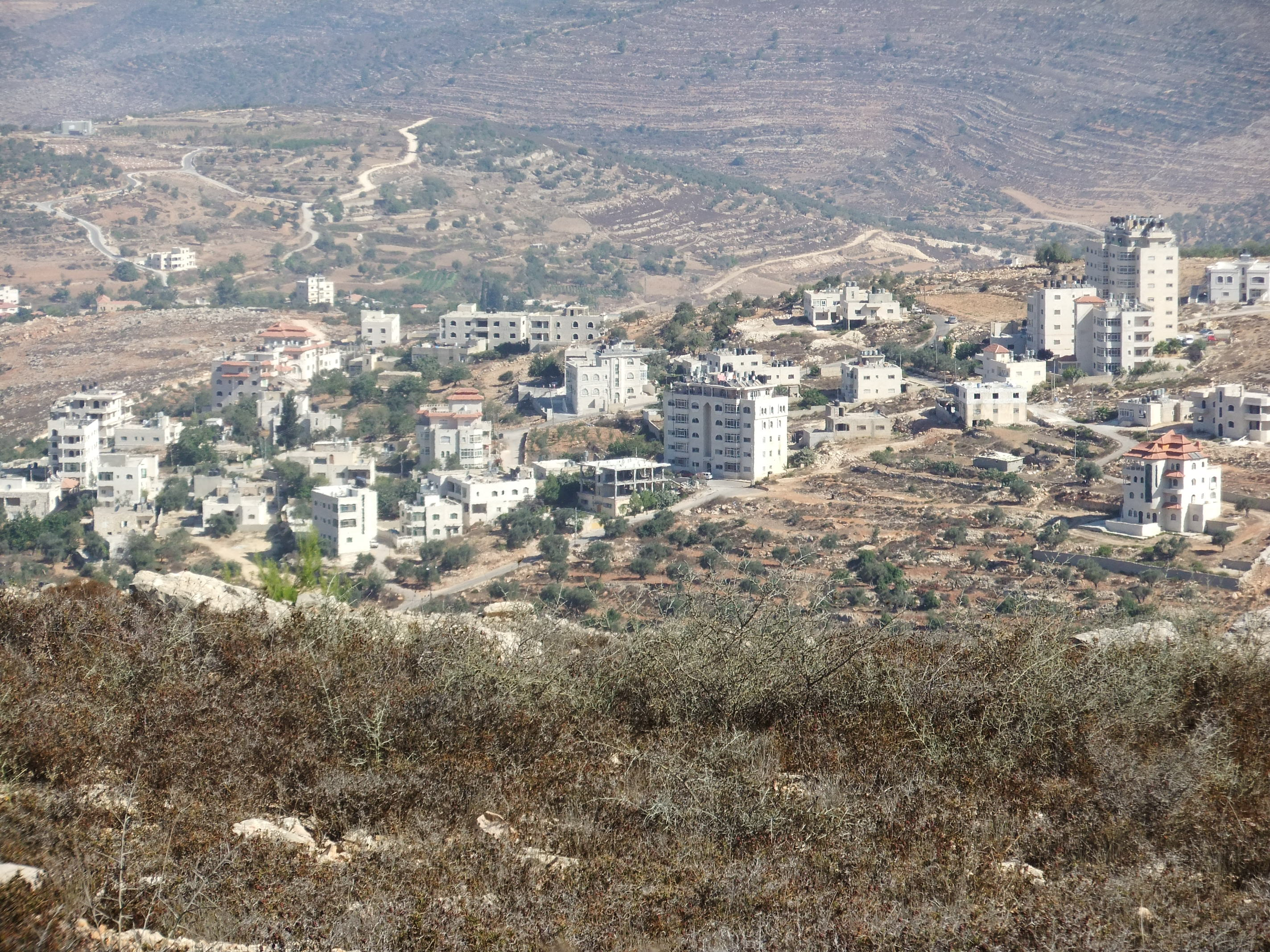
- View of Dura al-Qar'

- Location of Dura al-Qar' within Palestine
- Coordinates: 31°57′33″N 35°13′42″E
- Palestine grid: 171/151
- State: State of Palestine
- Governorate: Ramallah and al-Bireh

Government
  - Type: Village council

Area
  - Total: 4.0 km^{2} (1.5 sq mi)
- Elevation: 728 m (2,388 ft)

Population (2017)
  - Total: 3,032
  - Density: 760/km^{2} (2,000/sq mi)
- Name meaning: "a circle"

Dura al-Qar' (Arabic: دورا القرع) or Dura al-Qari'a is a Palestinian town in the central West Bank, part of the Ramallah and al-Bireh Governorate. According to the Palestinian Central Bureau of Statistics, Dura al-Qar' had a population of 3,032 inhabitants in 2017.

The town's total land area is 4,016 dunams, of which 2,891 dunams have been appropriated by Israel mostly for the purpose of building a by-pass road. According to Dura al-Qar's village council, 142 families have been directly affected by the confiscations and 58% of the town's population depend on those lands as main sources of income.

== Geography ==
Dura el Qar' is located on the Samarian hills, 6.6 kilometers (4.1 mi) north-east of Ramallah. It is bordered by Ein Yabrud to the east, Ein Siniya to the north, Jifna, Al-Jalazun Camp and Surda to the west, and Al Bireh to the south.

The village is located atop irrigated terraces, constructed within a valley, accompanied by multiple private reservoirs.

== History ==
Potsherds from the Roman and Roman/Byzantine era have been found in the village.

=== Ottoman era ===
Potsherds from the early Ottoman era have been found here.

In 1838, it was noted as a Muslim village, Durah, in the Beni Harit district, north of Jerusalem.

In 1863 Victor Guérin found the village to have 250 inhabitants. He further described that old oaks shaded for ancient springs, which were used to irrigate the fields. Several houses in the village were built, at least in part, with ancient stones. An Ottoman village list from about 1870 found that the village had a population of 120, in 22 houses, though the population count only included men.

In 1882, the PEF's Survey of Western Palestine (SWP) described Durah as "a small village on the side of a valley, with springs on the south, and olives". In 1907, it was described as "a small, healthfully located Moslem village. Its inhabitants have a good reputation for peaceful relations with the Jifna Christians. The Durah people raise many vegetables."

In 1896 the population of Dura el-kara was estimated to be about 246 persons.

=== British Mandate era ===
In the 1922 census of Palestine, conducted by the British Mandate authorities, Dura el Qare' had a population of 191, all Muslims, increasing in the 1931 census to 303, still all Muslims, in a total of 71 houses.

In the 1945 statistics the population was 370, all Muslims, while the total land area was 4,166 dunams, according to an official land and population survey. Of this, 1,762 were allocated for plantations and irrigable land, 1,253 for cereals, while 18 dunams were classified as built-up areas.

=== Jordanian era ===
In the wake of the 1948 Arab–Israeli War, and after the 1949 Armistice Agreements, Dura al-Qar' came under Jordanian rule.

The Jordanian census of 1961 found 576 inhabitants in Dura Qar'.

=== 1967 and after ===
Since the Six-Day War in 1967, Dura al-Qar' has been under Israeli occupation.

After the 1995 accords, 23.3% of the village‟s total area has been classified as Area B land, while the remaining 76.7% is classified as Area C. Israel has “confiscated” 680 dunum of village land for constructing the Israeli settlement of Beit El.

On August 14, 1995, Kheir Abdel Hafid Qassem, a 24-year-old Palestinian man, was shot dead by an Israeli settler from Beit El, and many people were arrested, while he and about a 100 other residents of Dura al-Qar' were attempting to drive away settlers by tearing down Israeli canvas shelters and cinder-block buildings outside of the village.

== Demographics ==
Residents of Dura al-Qar', along with people in the nearby villages in the Ramallah Governorate such as al-Tira, Beit 'Anan and Beit Ur al-Fauqa, trace their origins to the town of Dura, southwest of Hebron. A former leader of Dura al-Qar' claimed that before they settled in the village, the inhabitants used to live in the Faria' Basin.

== Notable people ==
- Rabiha Diab (1954–2016)

== Bibliography ==
- Barron, J.B., ed. (1923). Palestine: Report and General Abstracts of the Census of 1922. Government of Palestine.
- Conder, C.R.; Kitchener, H.H. (1882). The Survey of Western Palestine: Memoirs of the Topography, Orography, Hydrography, and Archaeology. Vol. 2. London: Committee of the Palestine Exploration Fund.
- Finkelstein, I.; Lederman, Zvi, eds. (1997). Highlands of many cultures. Tel Aviv: Institute of Archaeology of Tel Aviv University Publications Section. ISBN 965-440-007-3.
- Government of Jordan, Department of Statistics (1964). First Census of Population and Housing. Volume I: Final Tables; General Characteristics of the Population (PDF).
- Government of Palestine, Department of Statistics (1945). Village Statistics, April, 1945.
- Guérin, V. (1869). Description Géographique Historique et Archéologique de la Palestine (in French). Vol. 1: Judee, pt. 3. Paris: L'Imprimerie Nationale.
- Grant, E. (1907). The Peasantry of Palestine. Boston, New York [etc.]: The Pilgrim Press.
- Hadawi, S. (1970). Village Statistics of 1945: A Classification of Land and Area ownership in Palestine. Palestine Liberation Organization Research Center.
- Hartmann, M. (1883). "Die Ortschaftenliste des Liwa Jerusalem in dem türkischen Staatskalender für Syrien auf das Jahr 1288 der Flucht (1871)". Zeitschrift des Deutschen Palästina-Vereins. 6: 102–149.
- Mills, E., ed. (1932). Census of Palestine 1931. Population of Villages, Towns and Administrative Areas. Jerusalem: Government of Palestine.
- Palmer, E.H. (1881). The Survey of Western Palestine: Arabic and English Name Lists Collected During the Survey by Lieutenants Conder and Kitchener, R. E. Transliterated and Explained by E.H. Palmer. Committee of the Palestine Exploration Fund.
- Robinson, E.; Smith, E. (1841). Biblical Researches in Palestine, Mount Sinai and Arabia Petraea: A Journal of Travels in the year 1838. Vol. 3. Boston: Crocker & Brewster.
- Schick, C. (1896). "Zur Einwohnerzahl des Bezirks Jerusalem". Zeitschrift des Deutschen Palästina-Vereins. 19: 120–127.
- Socin, A. (1879). "Alphabetisches Verzeichniss von Ortschaften des Paschalik Jerusalem". Zeitschrift des Deutschen Palästina-Vereins. 2: 135–163.
