= Amona, Mateh Binyamin =

Israeli outpost in the occupied Palestinian West Bank

Coordinates: 31.95214°N 35.27686°E

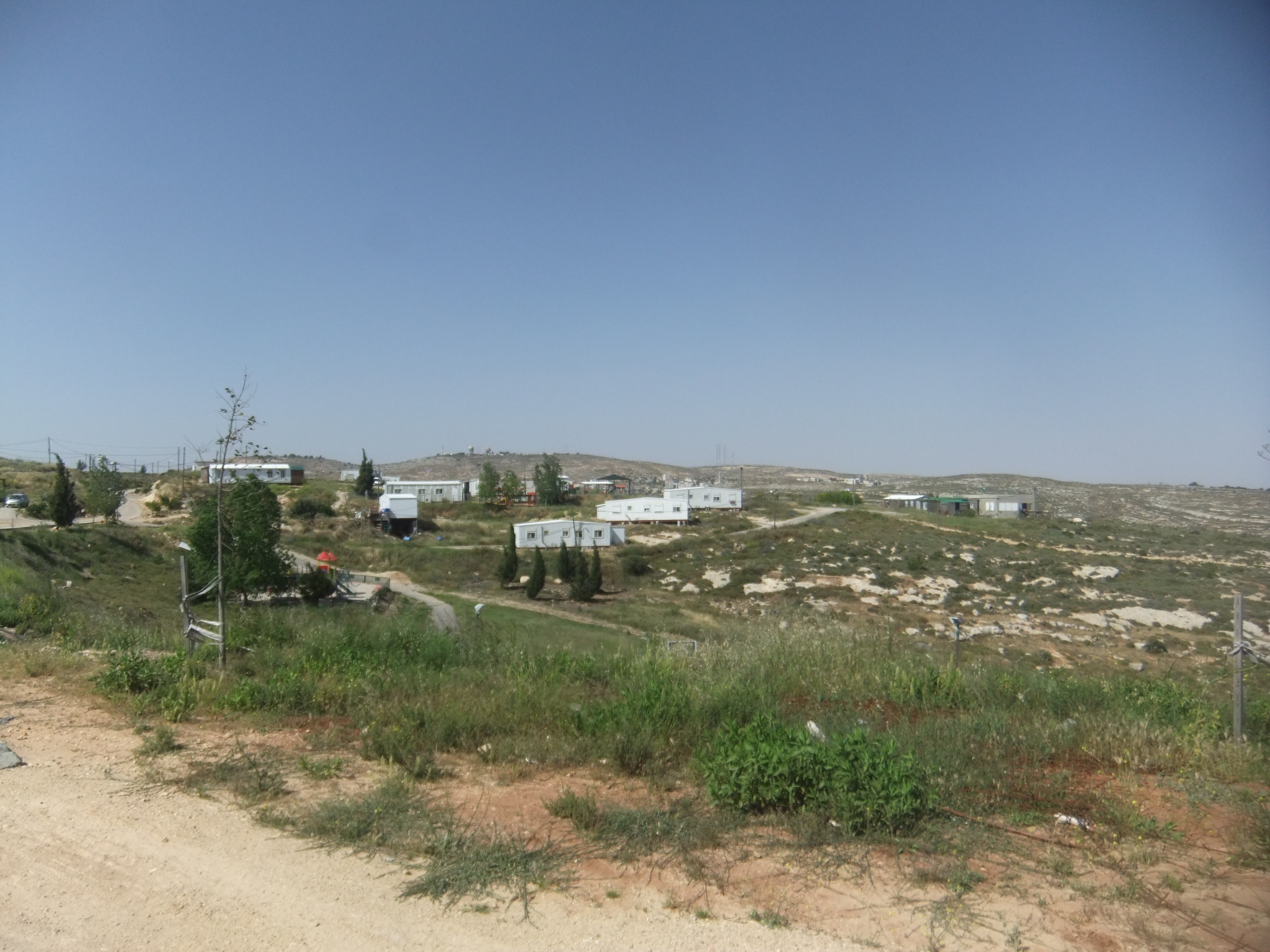
Amona

Amona (Hebrew: עמונה) was an Israeli outpost in the central West Bank. Located on a hill overlooking Ofra within the municipal boundaries of the Mateh Binyamin Regional Council, the village was founded in 1995 on privately owned Palestinian land. As of 2012, its population was around 200. As of October 2013, the outpost lodged 42 families. It was evacuated completely in February 2017 in compliance with a ruling by the Israeli Supreme Court.

The High Court of Israel ruled in 2006 that the settlement is illegal under Israeli law, but as of March 2013, its status remained unresolved as the Israeli government continued to fight the court's eviction order. In May 2014 an Israeli police investigation revealed the entire outpost lay on private Palestinian land, and that documents used by settlers to claim they had purchased the sites were forged. In December 2014, the Israeli High Court ordered the state to completely evacuate and demolish the settlement within two years. The international community considers all Israeli settlements in the West Bank illegal under international law.

Its name is derived from the Book of Joshua 18:24, which mentions Kfar Ha`Ammoni (ketiv, literally, Village of the Amonite) or Kfar Ha`Ammonah (qeri).

== Background ==
Amona was founded in 1995 on private Palestinian land by young settlers from Ofra who thought it was getting too urbanized for their taste. It was one of the first outposts. Amona was constructed on property the Palestinians of Silwad used to cultivate and grow crops on, land that was stolen from them by Ofra teenagers. According to documents of the Israeli Civil Administration, the land had been cultivated and worked by local Palestinians until the outpost was erected, though the settlers claim that the site was a rocky hilltop before. Yesh Din states that Amona is built on the land of three Palestinian villages, Silwad, Ein Yabrud and Taybeh. Amira Hass, interviewing one of the Silwad petitioners, Abed al Rahman Ashur, writes:

"In Arabic we say about cultivated land that it is 'laughing' land," says Abed al Rahman Ashur, 70, who is one of the 10 petitioners together with Peace Now against the unauthorized Jewish outpost Amona. Back at the start of the 1980s, nine dunams he owns, planted with fig trees and grapevines, stopped laughing by force of various military orders preventing access to them. Thirty-two dunams stopped laughing after the outpost of Amona was established at the end of the 1990s on private lands belonging to inhabitants of the villages of Silwad, Dir Jarir and Taibeh.

It is usually categorized as an outpost because its construction was never officially approved by the Israeli government, although according to the settlers, the state played a role in supporting the outpost through the provision of electricity and other services by Israeli utilities.

Amona has become highly symbolic, revealing the role in the settlement enterprise of the settlement movement, the Israeli State and the Court. In 1997, the first demolition order was issued, followed by another one in 2003. In 2006, settlers were evacuated, but only nine permanent buildings were razed. In 2008, the state said that construction on the site was illegal and announced that the entire outpost would be razed. In 2011, the announcement was repeated, but as of January 2015, the outpost was still there.

== 2005 petition ==
In 2004, the Amana settlement organization completed the construction of nine permanent homes at Amona, all built illegally on privately owned land and appropriately registered to Palestinians. In October 2004, the Israeli Civil Administration ordered the demolition of the structures. On 3 July 2005, Peace Now petitioned the Israeli High Court charging Israeli authorities with failing to implement stop-work orders at the site, and with failing to implement demolition orders issues in October 2004. In November 2005, Israeli Defense Minister Shaul Mofaz ordered the demolition by the end of January 2006.

=== Evacuation ===
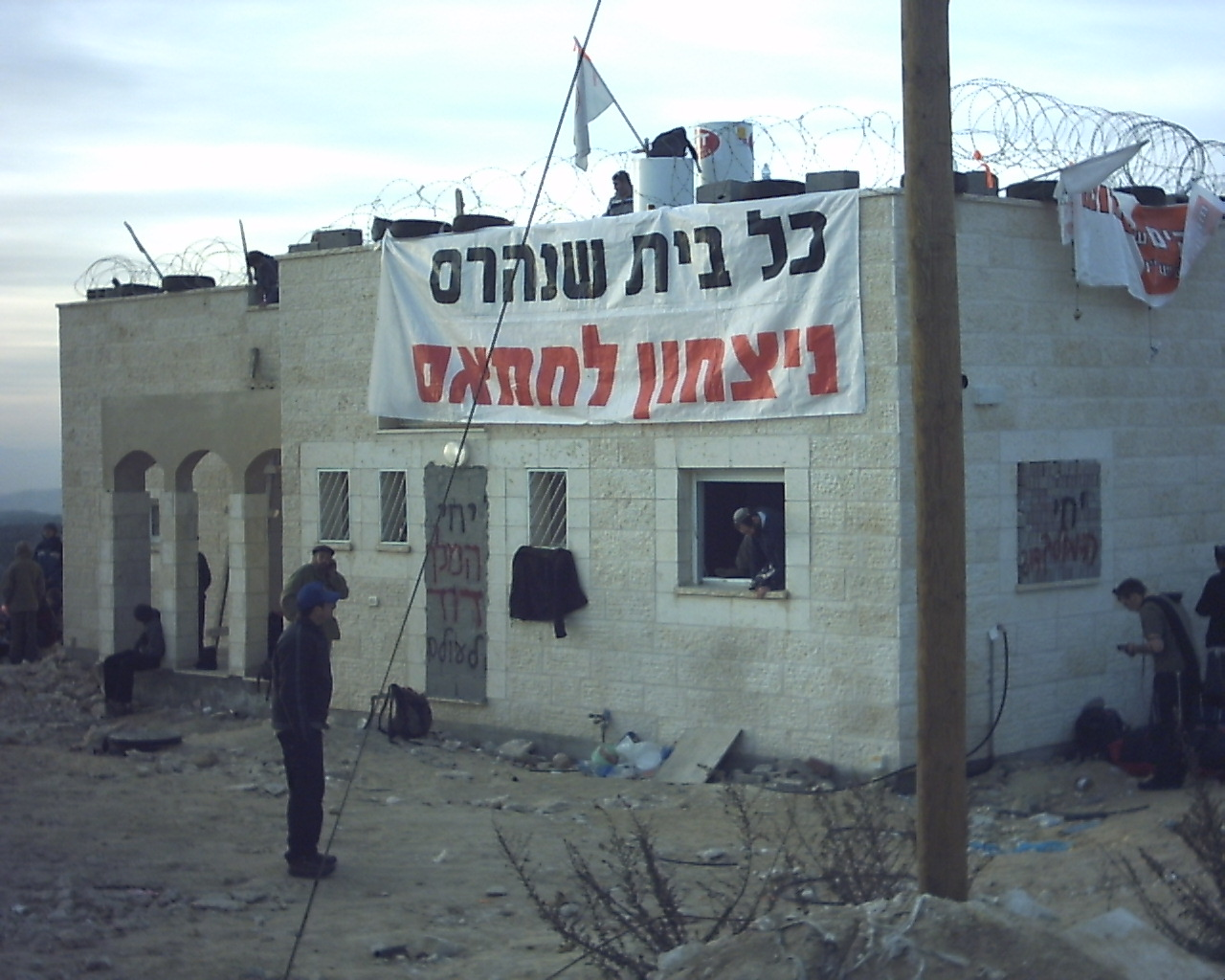
An Israeli home in Amona before the destruction by the Israel Defense Forces. The sign reads "Every house destroyed a victory for Hamas."

On 1 February 2006, settlers and protesters were evacuated, attended with unprecedented clashes. 10,000 Israel Police, Israel Border Police, and Israel Defense Forces troops appeared in Amona to carry out the demolition and to secure the troops involved in the operation. They faced an estimated 4,000 Israeli protesters, one thousand actively protesting inside and around the houses, and another few thousand in the surrounding area. The protesters mostly consisted of youths from across the country, but especially from nearby settlements and schools, some of which had fortified themselves inside the homes and on the roofs in an effort to block, delay, or protest the order being carried out. Over 300 people were injured, including about 80 security personnel. Among the injured were three Knesset members. After several hours, the houses were demolished. Young girls that were evacuated accused police officers of sexual assault.

=== Parliamentary inquiry ===
In March 2006, the Knesset parliamentary inquiry into the events at Amona determined that security forces had employed excessive brutality, striking protesters with clubs and charging them with horses. Internal Security Minister Gideon Ezra was criticised for preventing police commanders from testifying at the hearings. The committee also found contradictions in the testimonies of the Army Chief of Staff Dan Halutz and the Internal Security Minister. Despite these findings, no resignations followed. In May 2006 Israeli President Moshe Katsav met with some of the protesters injured at Amona and stated that he would ask for a renewal of the investigation.

== 2008 petition ==
In 2008, the Israeli non-governmental organization Yesh Din petitioned the Supreme Court on behalf of the Palestinian landowners, demanding the demolition of the entire outpost. The State repeatedly requested a delay. On 28 April 2013, the court granted a last postponement of the evacuation until 15 July 2013.

As the settlers contended they purchased some of the land in the meantime through the Al-Watan company, the Supreme Court again postponed the execution of the ruling. The court ordered that on 24 July only the uncontested homes and part of the access road should be torn down, pending a petition by the settlers before the Jerusalem Magistrates Court. While only one Palestinian owner petitioned the court, Attorney General Yehuda Weinstein instructed the army to demolish only one building. At a High Court hearing on 20 August 2013, the state's attorney said that she believed the 24 July ruling applied only to those Amona residents whose names were attached to the petition. In May 2014, a police investigation into the Al-Watan company, a subsidiary of Ze'ev Hever's Amana organization, revealed that the documents filed by Al-Watan and Amona petitioners had been forged.

Meanwhile, Yesh Din filed another petition demanding the demolition of some 30 structures that were not evacuated. The Court confirmed that the case was against the entire outpost and that all structures (except the 16 contested homes) should be removed. On 14 October 2013, the state asked the court for a new postponement, to prevent "harm of Israel's diplomatic interests", and because there is "no concrete petitioner" (because it was a general claim). While previously, the evacuation was linked to illegal settlement on privately owned Palestinian land, this was the first time in the last few years that the state had spoken of the outpost evacuation within diplomatic terms. Commentators suggested that this move alluded to the current peace negotiations. The state also feared a precedent for other cases.

== 2014 court judgments ==
In June 2014 an Israeli court brought down a judgement awarding 300,000 shekels ($85,700) to 6 Palestinian plaintiffs, the owners affected by the Amona settlement on their land, and further ruled that the State is to pay out a further sum of 48,000 shekels ($13,500) in damages if it fails to remove the settlers by 2015.

In December 2014, the Israeli Supreme Court ordered the state to completely evacuate and demolish the settlement within two years. The judges wrote "These structures were built on privately owned land so there is no possibility of authorizing their construction, even retroactively. The military commander of Judea and Samaria must act decisively to protect the private property of residents who are under his protection, including protection from the usurpation of and illegal construction on their lands. This illegal construction on private land requires giving the highest priority to the enforcement of work stoppage and demolition orders." The judges also stated that it would make no difference if some of the land had been legally purchased since the settlement was established.

== Complete evacuation ==
The outpost of Amona was evacuated in February 2017 by order from the government of Israel.

== See also ==
- Migron, Mateh Binyamin
- Beit El
- Regulation Law
