= Amal Hamad =

Palestinian politician

Minister of Women's Affairs
- In office 13 April 2019 – 31 March 2024
- President: Mahmoud Abbas
- Prime Minister: Mohammad Shtayyeh
- Preceded by: Haifa al-Agha
- Succeeded by: Mona Al-Khalili

Member of the Fatah Central Committee

Member of the Fatah Revolutionary Council
- Incumbent
- Assumed office 2009

Deputy Secretary of the Revolutionary Council of Fatah

Member of the Palestinian National Council

Deputy Commissioner for International Relations of Fatah

Responsible Minister for the General Union of Palestinian Women in the Gaza Strip
- Incumbent
- Assumed office 2007

Personal details
- Born: Amal Tawfiq Abdel Hadi Nashwan Hamad; 12 July 1963 (age 63) Beit Hanoun, Egyptian-administered Gaza Strip, Palestine
- Party: Fatah
- Education: Birzeit University, Al-Aqsa University, Ain Shams University

Amal Tawfiq Abdel Hadi Nashwan Hamad (born 12 July 1963) is a Palestinian politician and feminist associated with the Fatah movement. She served as the Minister of Women's Affairs in the Shtayyeh Government.

She was born in 1963 in Beit Hanoun in the Gaza Strip. In her early years, Hamad received her education in Beit Hanoun and later pursued higher studies at Birzeit University, earning a bachelor's degree in mathematics and a diploma in education. She furthered her education with diplomas in teaching methods and educational psychology from Al-Aqsa University in Gaza. Later, she completed a master's degree in social psychology at Ain Shams University in Egypt and a doctorate in educational psychology from the same university in 2015.

Throughout her political career, Hamad has held significant roles, including being a member of the Fatah Central Committee and serving as the Responsible Minister for the General Union of Palestinian Women in Gaza since 2007. She was elected to the Fatah Revolutionary Council in 2009 and has been actively involved in various Palestinian political bodies. In 2019, she assumed the position of Minister of Palestinian Women's Affairs in the Shtayyeh Government, taking the oath before Palestinian President Mahmoud Abbas.

Preceded by Haifa al-Agha	Minister of Women's Affairs of Palestine; 2019–2024	Succeeded by Mona Al-Khalili
