= Ophni =

Ophni is a Hebrew Old Testament name meaning mouldy.

An important city of Benjamin (Joshua 18:24), it was second only to Jerusalem. It still survives in the modern Jifna or Jufna, 23 miles (37 km) northwest of Bethel.
