= Ministry of Women's Affairs (Palestine) =

Government ministry of Palestine

- وزارة شؤون المرأة

Agency overview
- Formed: 12 November 2003
- Jurisdiction: Government of Palestine
- Headquarters: Ramallah, Palestine
- Minister responsible: Mona Al-Khalili, Minister of Women's Affairs

The Ministry of Women's Affairs is a government agency responsible for promoting and protecting the rights of women in Palestine. The Ministry of Women's Affairs was established in 2003, and its mission is to develop and implement policies and programs aimed at improving the status of Palestinian women. The current minister is Mona Al-Khalili.

The Ministry of Women's Affairs' goals include advancing women's participation in decision-making at all levels, promoting gender equality and eliminating discrimination against women, increasing women's access to education, health care, and other basic services, and protecting women's rights in accordance with international standards.

== List of ministers ==
#	Name	Party	Government	Term start	Term end	Notes
1	Zahira Kamal	Fatah	8, 9	12 November 2003	29 March 2006	
2	Maryam Saleh	Hamas	10	29 March 2006	17 March 2007	
3	Amal Syam	Hamas	11	17 March 2007	14 June 2007	
4	Khouloud Daibes	Independent	12	14 June 2007	19 May 2009	
	Vacant		13	19 May 2009	4 June 2009	
5	Rabiha Diab	Fatah	13, 14, 15, 16	4 June 2009	2 June 2014	
6	Haifa al-Agha	Independent	17	2 June 2014	13 April 2019	
7	Amal Hamad	Fatah	18	13 April 2019	31 March 2024	
8	Mona Al-Khalili	Independent	19	31 March 2024	Incumbent	

== See also ==
- Women in Palestine
