= Rabiha Diab =

Palestinian politician (1954–2016)

Minister of Women's Affairs
- In office 19 May 2009 – 2 June 2014
- Prime Minister: Salam Fayyad; Rami Hamdallah
- Preceded by: Khouloud Daibes
- Succeeded by: Haifa al-Agha

Member of the Palestinian Legislative Council
- In office 18 February 2006 – 22 April 2016

Assistant Undersecretary of the Ministry of Youth and Sports

Personal details
- Born: 1954 Dura al-Qar', Jordanian-administered West Bank, Palestine
- Died: 22 April 2016 (aged 61–62) Ramallah, Palestine
- Party: Fatah
- Education: Bachelor of Arts in Sociology and Social Service, Birzeit University
- Occupation: Politician, sociologist

Rabiha Diab (1954 – 22 April 2016) was a Palestinian politician, sociologist and a member of Fatah. She was the Minister of Women's Affairs in the Palestinian Authority Government of May 2009 and in the successive governments of 2013–2014. Diab previously held the positions of Member of the Governments of Palestinian Legislative Council and of Assistant Undersecretary of the Ministry of Youth and Sports.

== Early life and education ==
Diab was born in 1954 in Dura al-Qar', Palestine. Diab was awarded a Bachelor of Arts in Sociology and Social Service in 1999 in Bethlehem, Palestine.

Political offices
Preceded by Khouloud Daibes	Minister of Women's Affairs; 2009–2014	Succeeded by Haifa al-Agha
