= Haifa al-Agha =

Palestinian politician

- هيفاء الأغا

Minister of Women's Affairs
- In office 2014–2019
- President: Mahmoud Abbas
- Prime Minister: Rami Hamdallah
- Preceded by: Rabiha Diab
- Succeeded by: Amal Hamad

Personal details
- Education: PhD in Educational Studies from Oklahoma State University

Haifa al-Agha (Arabic: هيفاء الأغا) is the Minister of Women's Affairs for the new Palestinian unity government created in 2014.

Al-Agha is educated from the Oklahoma State University, where she obtained her PhD in 1991 in Educational Studies. She has formerly served as the Minister of Education, for Hamas on the Gaza Strip.

| Preceded by Rabiha Diab | Minister of Women's Affairs of Palestine; 2014-2019 | Succeeded by Amal Hamad |
