= Amal Syam (Hamas member) =

Palestinian politician and cabinet member

Minister of Women's Affairs
- In office March 2007 – ?
- President: Mahmoud Abbas
- Prime Minister: Ismail Haniyeh

Personal details
- Born: 14 December 1962 (age 63)
- Party: Hamas

Amal Syam (Arabic: أمل صيام) (born December 14, 1962) is a member of the Palestinian group Hamas. She served as the Minister of Women's Affairs in the March 2007 unity cabinet of the Palestinian National Authority.
