= Yabrud, Palestine =

Yabrud
- Municipality type D (Village council)

Arabic transcription(s)
  - Arabic: يبرود
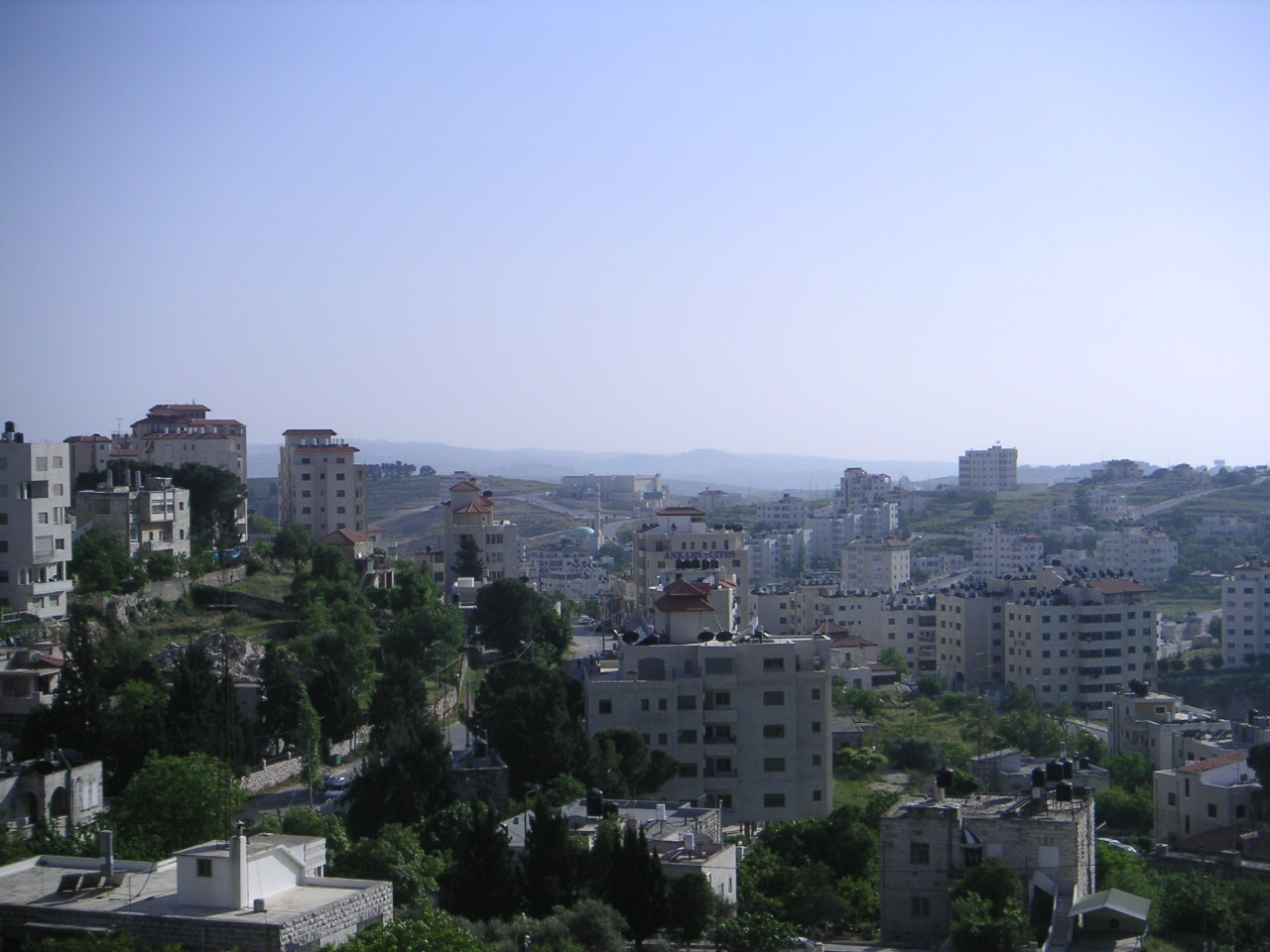
- Yabrud

- Location of Yabrud within Palestine
- Coordinates: 31°58′31″N 35°14′37″E
- Palestine grid: 173/153
- State: State of Palestine
- Governorate: Ramallah and al-Bireh

Government
  - Type: Village council
  - Head of Municipality: Salah Muhammad Ahmad Radi

Area
  - Total: 2.5 km^{2} (0.97 sq mi)

Population (2017)
  - Total: 575
  - Density: 230/km^{2} (600/sq mi)
- Name meaning: from barid, cold

Yabrud (Arabic: يبرود) is a Palestinian village in the Ramallah and al-Bireh Governorate in the central West Bank. It is located approximately 13 km northeast of the city of Ramallah and its elevation is 790 m. According to the Palestinian Central Bureau of Statistics (PCBS) 2017 census, the town had a population of 575.

== Location ==
Yabrud is located 8.7 km northeast of Ramallah. It is bordered by Silwad to the east and north, 'Ein Siniya village to the west, and Silwad and 'Ein Yabrud territories to the south.

== History ==
Potsherds from the Iron Age II and the Byzantine eras have been found here. A burial cave dating back to the Herodian period was also discovered here. Additionally, remnants from the Byzantine period have been integrated into a local wely.

Yaqut (1179–1229) noted about Ein Yabrud and Yabrud: "A village lying north of Jerusalem, on the road from the Holy City to Nabulus, between which and Yabrud is Kafar Natha. It possesses orchards and vineyards, and olives and Sumach trees."

Potsherds from the Crusader/Ayyubid and Mamluk era have also been found here.

=== Ottoman era ===
Yabrud was incorporated into the Ottoman Empire in 1517 with all of Palestine, and in 1596 it appeared in the tax registers as being in the nahiya of Al-Quds in the liwa of Al-Quds. It had a population of 28 household; who were all Muslims. They paid a fixed tax-rate of 33.3% on agricultural products, including wheat, barley, olive trees, vineyards/fruit trees, goats and beehives, in addition to occasional revenues; a total of 3,500 akçe. Potsherds from the Ottoman era have also been found here.

In 1838, Yebrud was noted as Muslim village in the Beni Murrah district, north of Jerusalem.

In 1870, Victor Guérin described Yabroud as being located on a hill, with five hundred inhabitants, and whose plantations, vineyards and figs were very well maintained. An Ottoman village list from about the same year, 1870, found that Jabrud had a population of 127, in 36 houses, though the population count included men, only.

In 1882, the PEF's Survey of Western Palestine described Yebrud as: "a village of small size a hill, with a well and extensive fig gardens or terraces to the east, and olives to the west. The roads are here walled in."

In 1896 the population of Jabrud was estimated to be about 276 persons.

=== British Mandate era ===
In the 1922 census of Palestine, conducted by the British Mandate authorities, Yabrud had a population of 199 Muslims, increasing in the 1931 census to 254 Muslims, in 60 houses.

In the 1945 statistics Yabrud had a population of 300 Muslims, while the total land area was 2,431 dunams, according to an official land and population survey. Of this, 1,290 were used for plantations and irrigable land, 350 for cereals, while 26 dunams were classified as built-up (urban) areas.

=== Jordanian era ===
In the wake of the 1948 Arab–Israeli War, and after the 1949 Armistice Agreements, Yabrud came under Jordanian rule.

In 1961, the population of Yabrud was 349.

=== 1967-present ===
Since the Six-Day War in 1967, Yabrud has been under Israeli occupation.

After the 1995 accords, 79.4% of village land was classified as Area B, the remaining 20.6% as Area C.

== Bibliography ==
- Barron, J.B., ed. (1923). Palestine: Report and General Abstracts of the Census of 1922. Government of Palestine.
- Conder, C.R.; Kitchener, H.H. (1882). The Survey of Western Palestine: Memoirs of the Topography, Orography, Hydrography, and Archaeology. Vol. 2. London: Committee of the Palestine Exploration Fund.
- Dauphin, C. (1998). La Palestine byzantine, Peuplement et Populations. BAR International Series 726 (in French). Vol. III : Catalogue. Oxford: Archeopress. ISBN 0-860549-05-4.
- Finkelstein, I.; Lederman, Zvi, eds. (1997). Highlands of many cultures. Tel Aviv: Institute of Archaeology of Tel Aviv University Publications Section. ISBN 965-440-007-3.
- Government of Jordan, Department of Statistics (1964). First Census of Population and Housing. Volume I: Final Tables; General Characteristics of the Population (PDF).
- Government of Palestine, Department of Statistics (1945). Village Statistics, April, 1945.
- Guérin, V. (1875). Description Géographique Historique et Archéologique de la Palestine (in French). Vol. 2: Samarie, pt. 2. Paris: L'Imprimerie Nationale.
- Hadawi, S. (1970). Village Statistics of 1945: A Classification of Land and Area ownership in Palestine. Palestine Liberation Organization Research Center.
- Hartmann, M. (1883). "Die Ortschaftenliste des Liwa Jerusalem in dem türkischen Staatskalender für Syrien auf das Jahr 1288 der Flucht (1871)". Zeitschrift des Deutschen Palästina-Vereins. 6: 102–149.
- Hütteroth, W.-D.; Abdulfattah, K. (1977). Historical Geography of Palestine, Transjordan and Southern Syria in the Late 16th Century. Erlanger Geographische Arbeiten, Sonderband 5. Erlangen, Germany: Vorstand der Fränkischen Geographischen Gesellschaft. ISBN 3-920405-41-2.
- Le Strange, G. (1890). Palestine Under the Moslems: A Description of Syria and the Holy Land from A.D. 650 to 1500. Committee of the Palestine Exploration Fund.
- Macalister, R.A.S. (1907). "Some New Inscriptions from Jerusalem and its Neighbourhood". Quarterly Statement - Palestine Exploration Fund. 39 (3): 234–239. doi:10.1179/peq.1907.39.3.234.
- Mills, E., ed. (1932). Census of Palestine 1931. Population of Villages, Towns and Administrative Areas. Jerusalem: Government of Palestine.
- Palmer, E.H. (1881). The Survey of Western Palestine: Arabic and English Name Lists Collected During the Survey by Lieutenants Conder and Kitchener, R. E. Transliterated and Explained by E.H. Palmer. Committee of the Palestine Exploration Fund.
- Robinson, E.; Smith, E. (1841). Biblical Researches in Palestine, Mount Sinai and Arabia Petraea: A Journal of Travels in the year 1838. Vol. 3. Boston: Crocker & Brewster.
- Schick, C. (1896). "Zur Einwohnerzahl des Bezirks Jerusalem". Zeitschrift des Deutschen Palästina-Vereins. 19: 120–127.
- Socin, A. (1879). "Alphabetisches Verzeichniss von Ortschaften des Paschalik Jerusalem". Zeitschrift des Deutschen Palästina-Vereins. 2: 135–163.
