= Jalazone =

Jalazone Camp
- Refugee Camp

Arabic transcription(s)
  - Arabic: مخيّم الجلزون
  - Latin: al-Jalazun Camp (official) al-Jalazoun Camp (unofficial)
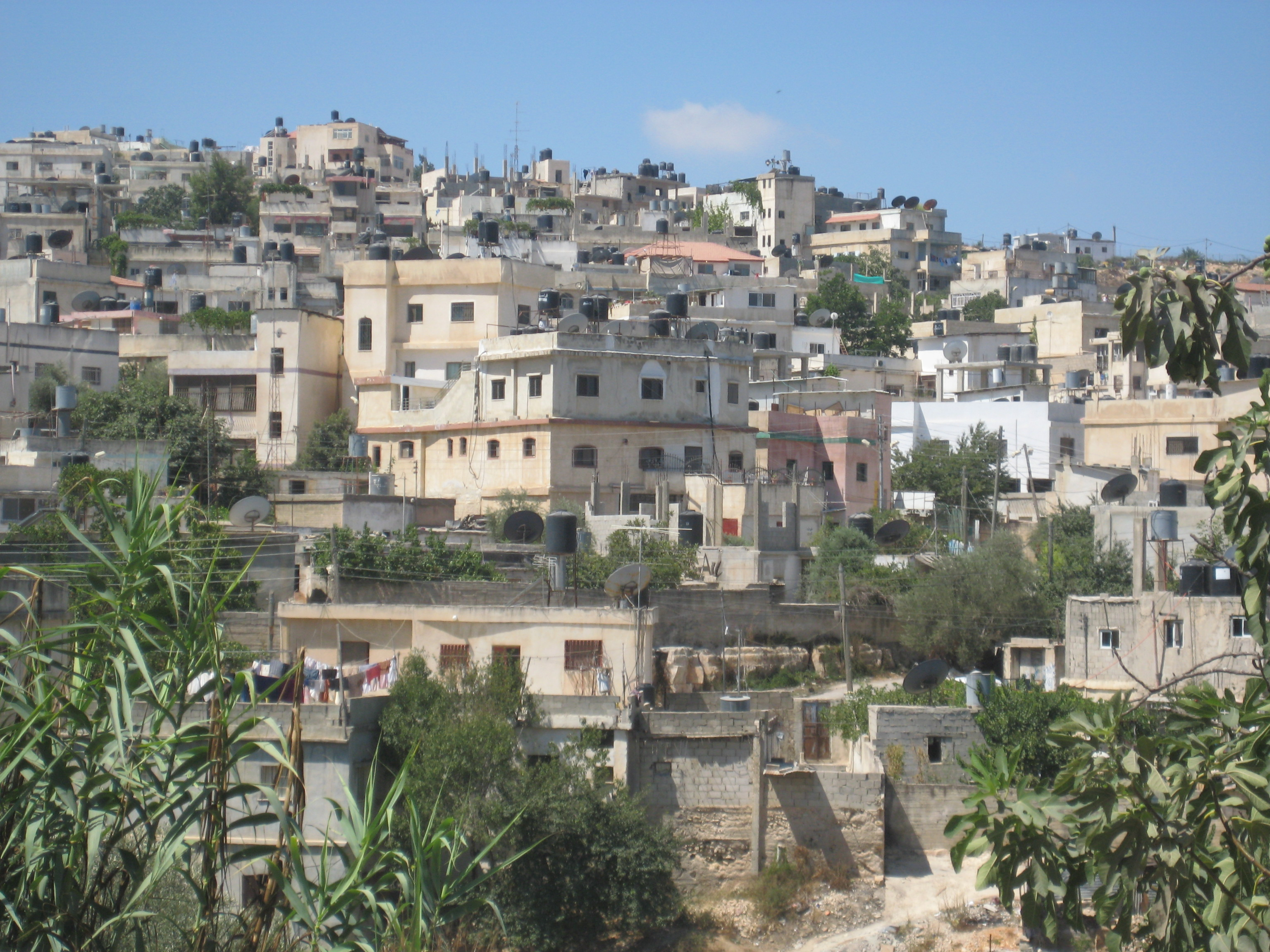
- View of Jalazone Camp from road coming from Jifna in 2009, Khaldun Bshara

- Location of Jalazone Camp within Palestine
- Coordinates: 31°57′07.15″N 35°12′41.58″E
- State: State of Palestine
- Governorate: Ramallah and al-Bireh

Government
  - Type: Refugee Camp (from 1949)

Area
  - Total: 0.25 km^{2} (0.097 sq mi)

Population (2017)
  - Total: 8,201
  - Density: 33,000/km^{2} (85,000/sq mi)

Jalazone (Arabic: مخيّم الجلزون) is a Palestinian refugee camp in the Ramallah and al-Bireh Governorate, located 7 kilometers (4.3 mi) north of Ramallah and adjacent to the village of Jifna to the north, Deir Dibwan to the east, Bir Zeit to the west and the Beit El Israeli settlement to the southeast.

== History ==
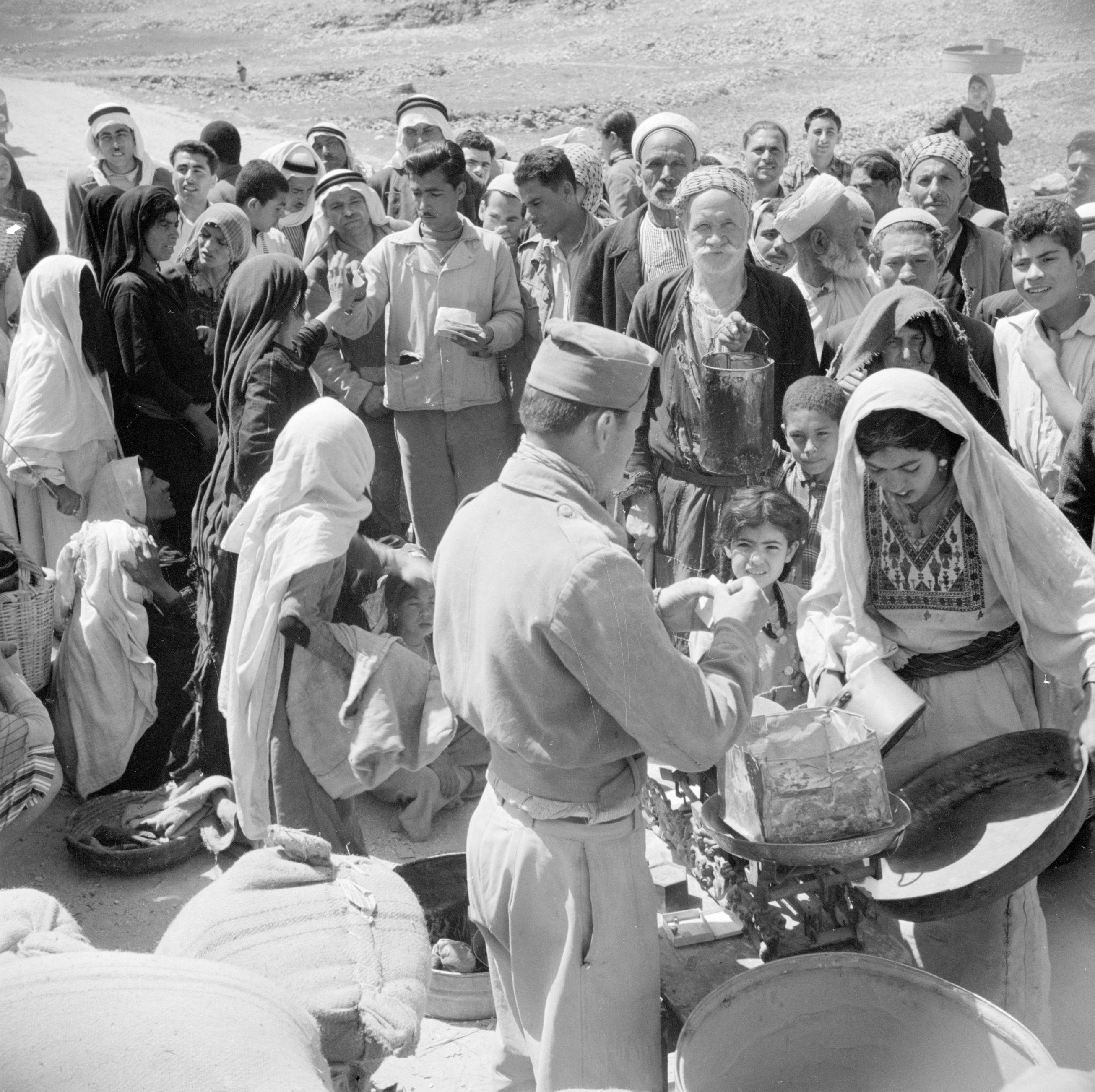
Distribution of food in the camp in 1953

Jalazone was established in 1949 on 253 dunams of land, as a result of the Palestinian expulsion following the 1948 Arab-Israeli War. Like all official West Bank refugee camps, the United Nations Relief and Works Agency (UNRWA) had leased the land from Jordan. Most of the plots were state owned before the lease, while the remainder belonged to landowners from various nearby towns. After the Oslo Agreements between the Palestinian National Authority (PNA) and Israel, Jalazone's administrative affairs were transferred to the PNA while security matters remained under Israeli control. UNRWA also provides services to the camp.

== Demographics ==
According to the Palestinian Central Bureau of Statistics (PCBS), Jalazone had a population of 8,201 inhabitants in 2017. The Office for the Coordination of Humanitarian Affairs (OCHA) estimated the total population to be 14,520 in 2007. The number of inhabitants before 1967 was 5,013. The gender ratio in 2007 was 51.3% male and 48.7% female. The average age of camp residents was 24.

The majority of the refugees were from Lydda and many other Arab villages in central Palestine. The camp is largely maintained by the UNRWA with funding by Saudi Arabia. According to UNRWA archives in 2005, the majority of the families in the camp are descendants of refugees originally from Bayt Nabala (643 families) the neighboring town of Lydda (373 families). According to OCHA statistics, refugees in Jalazone hail from a total of 36 villages, most located in central Palestine, and mainly from Bayt Nabala, Annaba, al-Muzayri'a, Innaba, and al-Khayriyya. Others came from northern towns and villages, particularly Tiberias, Haifa, Sabbarin, Umm az-Zinat as well as al-Dawayima in the south near Hebron.
