= Ofra =

Israeli settlement in the West Bank

Ofra: עֹפְרָה (Hebrew)
- Israeli settlement
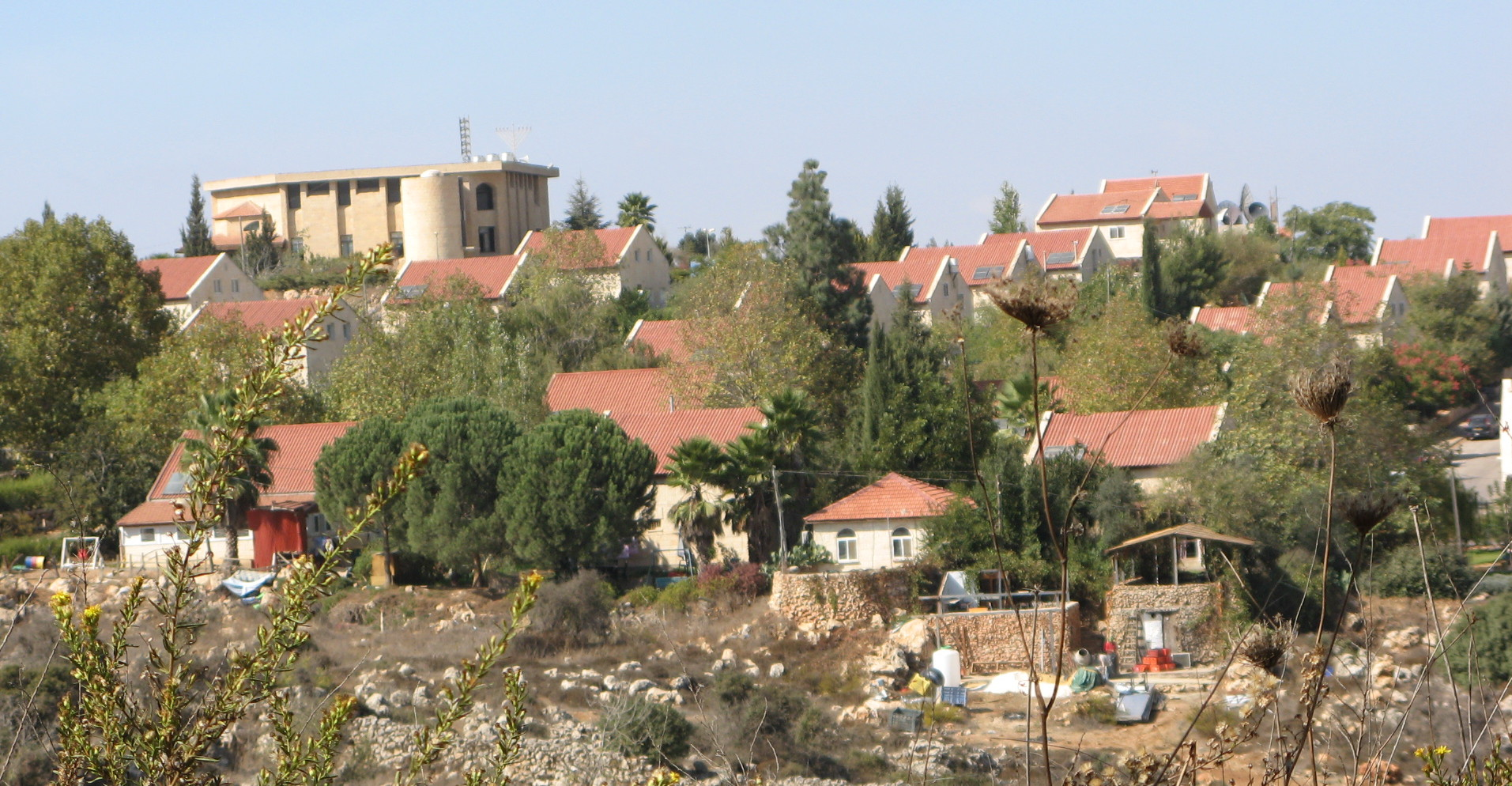
- Ofra taken from Givat Zvi

- Location within the Central West Bank Location within the West Bank Location within State of Palestine
- Coordinates: 31°57′20″N 35°15′37″E
- Country: Palestine
- District: Judea and Samaria Area
- Council: Mateh Binyamin
- Region: West Bank
- Founded: 1975
- Founder: Gush Emunim
- Population (2024): 3,110
- Website: www.ofra.org.il

Ofra (Hebrew: עֹפְרָה) is an Israeli settlement located in the northern Israeli-occupied West Bank. Located on the main road between Jerusalem and Nablus (Route 60), it falls under the jurisdiction of Mateh Binyamin Regional Council. In 2024 it had a population of 3,110.

The international community considers Israeli settlements in the West Bank illegal under international law. According to human rights organization B'Tselem, the state of Israel itself acknowledges that much of the Ofra civilian settlement is built on privately owned Palestinian land, which is unlawful according to Israeli law.

In August 2016, the military governorate admitted to the Israeli High Court of Justice that a large portion of Ofra, totalling 45 dunams, was built on land privately owned by Palestinians prior to the occupation, including areas "located in the heart of the settlement". Following the ruling of the High Court that Israeli homes in this area were illegal, the state has undertaken steps with the goal of restituting the land back to its private Palestinian owners. Following the successful effort to demolish the settlement of Amona, Silwad mayor Abdul Rahman Saleh signaled that he would petition the High Court on behalf of Ofra landowners with the goal of evicting Israeli settlers there. Considering the Jordanian military base which existed there, he accepted the presence of Israeli soldiers.

== Name ==
Ofra is named after the ancient town of Ophrah, which was mentioned twice in the Hebrew Bible (Joshua 18:23; 1 Samuel 13:17). Ophrah is identified with modern-day Taybeh, a Christian village located a few kilometers to the east.

== History ==
According to ARIJ, Israel confiscated land from three nearby Palestinian villages and towns in order to construct Ofra:

- 1252 dunums of land were taken from Ein Yabrud,
- 988 dunums of land were taken from Silwad,
- 22 dunums of land were taken from Taybeh.

Ofra's establishment in April/May 1975 was part of a struggle between the Gush Emunim settlement movement, which was founded in February 1974, and the Israeli Labor government, which opposed Israeli settlement amid densely populated Palestinian areas.

Originally established on the site of a former Jordanian military base, Israeli civilians moved into surrounding areas formerly inhabited by Palestinians and built permanent and temporary structures there, creating the settlement of Ofra.

The establishing group from Gush Emunim first obtained jobs at a nearby military base on Mount Ba'al Hatzor. They established a work camp in the abandoned barracks of a Jordanian army base. They then brought in their families and raised an Israeli flag. Though opposed by then Prime Minister Yitzhak Rabin, Ofra was given political backing by Shimon Peres, then defense minister in Rabin's government, and by his settlement adviser Moshe Netzer.

After the Labour Party was defeated by the Likud Party in the 1977 Israeli election, the new government recognized Ofra as a community, paving the way for expansion into the surrounding hills. It was designed as an "island" for a selected homogenous population, where all members would share the same "ideological-social background."

Many institutions of the Jewish settlers in the West Bank were first located or established in Ofra, including the Yesha Council and the Nekuda monthly magazine, founded and edited by Israel Harel.

Several Ofra residents were killed by Palestinian militants during the Second Intifada.

== Geography ==
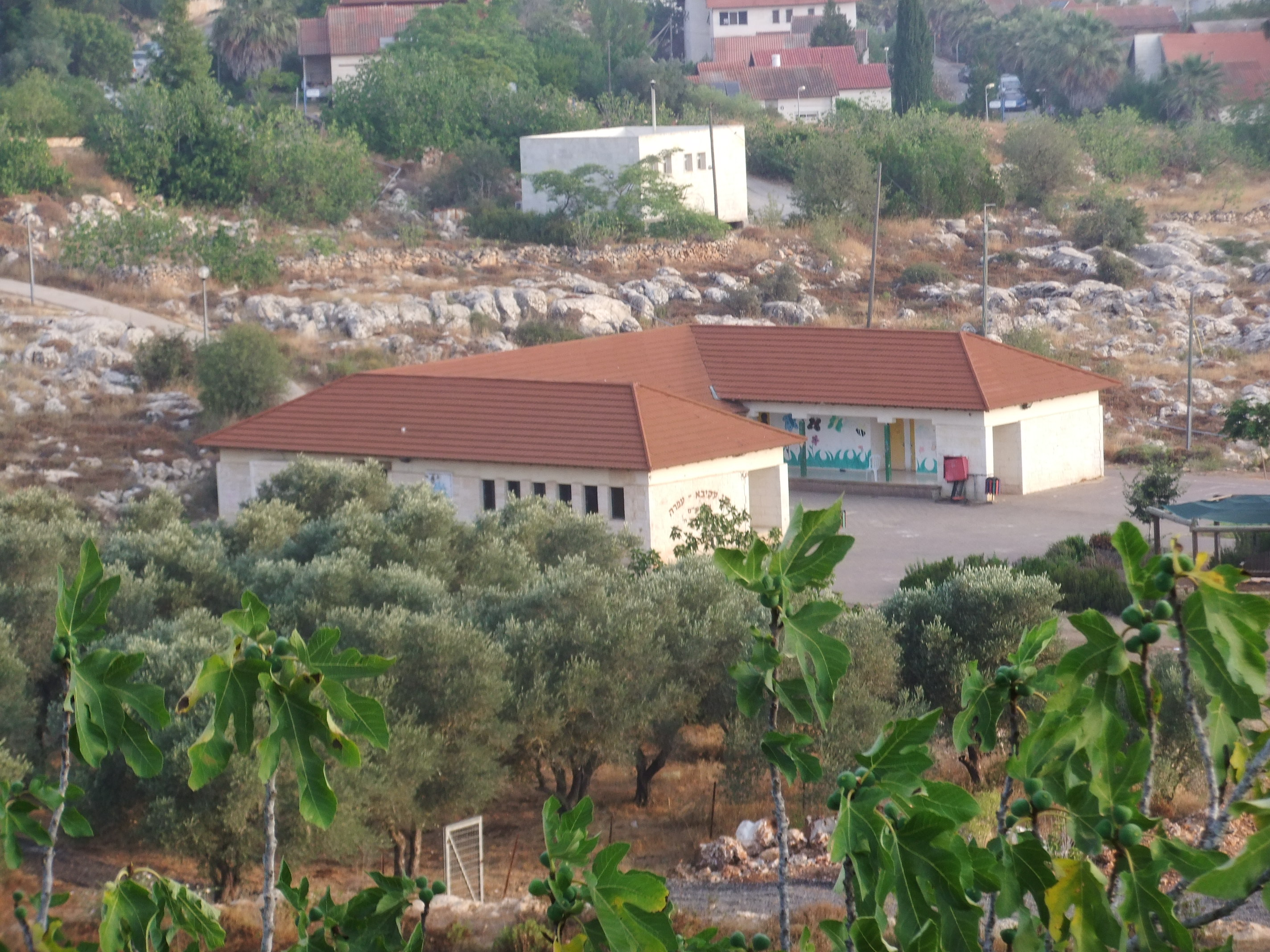
Bnei Akiva youth club in Ofra

Ofra is located east of the Israeli West Bank barrier, circa 25 kilometers from the Green line, and 20 kilometers north of the Green Line in Jerusalem. It is situated in the mountain-range area at 850–900 meters above sea level. The climate is mediterranean-mountainous. Cold and humid winters with several days of snow almost every year and a rain yearly average of about 750 millimeters (29.5 inches). The summers are dry and mild. Ofra lies in a karstic region, with several stalactite caves and dolines. The Center for Cave Research (HaMerkaz Lekheker Me'arot) is located in Ofra.

The settlement is divided into three main neighborhoods: Neve David, Giv'at Tzvi and the core of the settlement, which is itself divided into four sections. In addition there are three caravan neighborhoods and another neighborhood ("HaShkhuna HaZmanit", lit. the temporary neighborhood) of houses belonging to the Ofra Cooperative Society, rented mostly to newcomers including a community of Bnei Menashe from Manipur and Mizoram.

Ofra borders the Palestinian villages and towns of Ein Yabrud, Silwad, Deir Jarir, Rammun, Deir Dibwan and At-Taybeh. The last is believed to be the site of biblical Ofra. It is often known locally as Ein Yabrud Heights.

=== Outposts ===
In 1997, the outpost Amona was established on private lands belonging to inhabitants of the villages of Silwad, Deir Jarir and Taibeh. In 2006, Amona was evacuated, accompanied with violent clashes. Eventually, the state refused to demolish the outpost. As of August 2013 the case remains in dispute following the purchase by Jewish residents of five land plots from the Palestinian owners. In February 2017, The outpost of Amona was evacuated by order from the government of Israel.

== Economy ==
Ofra's climate is suitable for growing cherries, nectarines, kiwifruit, grapes, and olives. Other branches of agriculture include honey and poultry farming. In the nearby industrial area there are some small light-manufacturing workshops of carpentry and welding.

In the verdict of the Supreme Court of Israel, the Ofra waste disposal plant, built with state funds, lies on Palestinian land. Prior to its construction, Ofra's sewage flowed into local rivers for three decades, polluting the Mountain Aquifer. The Palestinian landowners, through Yesh Din, have sought redress in Israel's Supreme Court. To legalize the plant, Israel would have to expropriate the Palestinians' property on which the treatment plant is built. But this measure would require that it service the waste disposal needs of the Palestinian villages nearby, which would exceed its capacity. Various proposals have been raised to resolve the problem. The State is considering linking the villagers of Ein Yabrud to the plant, since they lack adequate waste treatment, but they decline the idea. According to Michael Sfard, a lawyer acting on their behalf, the state would have to reach an agreement to lease the land from the Palestinian villagers, negotiate a deal with the Israeli–Palestinian Joint Water Committee, and secure the requisite planning permits to legalise the situation. He regards such an outcome as improbable.

== Education ==
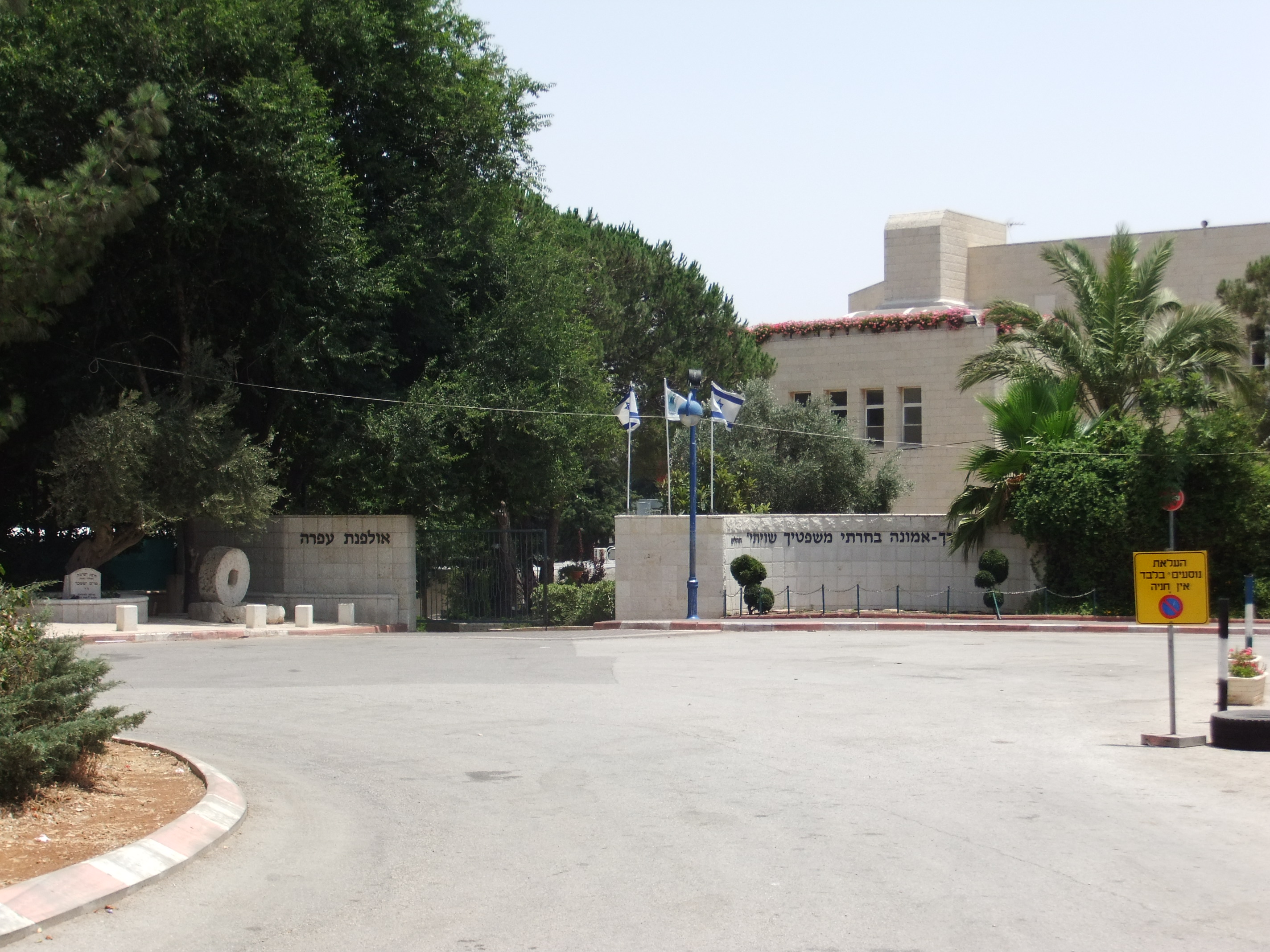
Ulpana Ofra

Today there are kindergartens, elementary schools, a girls high school (Ulpana Ofra, established in 1986), a midrasha (Midreshet Shuva) and a field school (a special school for biology environmental studies). The field school holds a permanent exhibition of the fauna of the area and of ancient agriculture. Ofra also has a bird watching center, located in a reservation near the Givat Tzvi neighborhood.

== Legal status ==
=== Status under international law ===
Like all Israeli settlements in the Israeli-occupied territories, Ofra is considered illegal under international law. The international community considers Israeli settlements to violate the Fourth Geneva Convention's prohibition on the transfer of an occupying power's civilian population into occupied territory. The Israeli government disputes this on the basis of their position that the Palestinian territories are not occupied territory and as such does not accept that the Fourth Geneva Convention applies de jure, but has stated that on humanitarian issues it will govern itself de facto by its provisions, without specifying which these are. The position of successive Israeli governments is that all authorized settlements are entirely legal and consistent with international law. This view has been rejected by the International Court of Justice, the International Committee of the Red Cross and United Nations bodies.

=== Status under Israeli law ===
The Sasson Report in 2003 introduced criteria for determining the legality of a given settlement under Israeli law. In June 2007, Haaretz reported that 179 of the 600 buildings in Ofra are considered illegal by the Israeli administration.

Ofra is built on private Palestinian land. In a December 2008 report, B'Tselem has argued that while all Israeli settlements in the West Bank are illegal under international law, Ofra is illegal even under Israeli law stating that it violates three of the four established criteria for legality in the Sasson report. According to the report, while Ofra was authorized in 1979, it was never defined a jurisdictional area, never had an outline plan approved and no lawful building permits were issued. The report added that at least 58 percent of the settlement's built-up area is registered in the Land Registry Office under the names of Palestinians. Ofra residents claim the land was purchased legally from the Palestinians. They contended that the land was purchased legally but suggested that showing documents of the purchases would lead to Palestinian retribution attacks. Land deals are usually kept secret to protect Palestinian sellers. The Yesha Council accused B'Tselem of trying to remove Jews from their land saying the group "will spare no means - even lies" in order to harm the settlements.

Homes were built on land bought with forged documents. Hundreds of structures in Ofra came under a demolition order from the Civil Administration after the villagers of Ein Yabrud laid a petition at the Israeli High Court of Justice over construction on their private land.

A secret database, published by Haaretz in 2009, confirmed that Ofra was largely built on private Palestinian lands, without approval. In September 2011, the Israeli government set up plans to legitimise the settlement retroactively.

Ofra's settlement fence was built without permits over wide swathes of land belonging to the Palestinian villages of Deir Dibwan and Silwad. The IDF has confirmed that permits were lacking, and undertook to rebuild the fence closer to Ofra within 2012. Top quality soil from this agricultural land is systematically 'stolen' for settlement use. One house near the settlement, owned by the Palestinian Shehadeh family, who won a Jerusalem district court judgement in their favour, is still used as a yeshiva for Ofra's married men, and was expropriated by the IDF in favour of the settlers 10 days after the verdict was passed. In the wake of a suit filed in 2008, on 9 February 2015, the Israeli Supreme Court ordered the demolition of 9 Ofra homes as standing on land with Palestinian title. The government was given two years to demolish the housing. Police began evacuating settlers and protesters on 28 February 2017 from nine Ofra houses ordered for demolition by an Israeli High Court order.

== Notable residents ==
- Zhabo Erlich
- Yehuda Etzion
- Mike Netzer
- Efim Rinenberg
