= Ein Yabrud =

- Municipality type C

Arabic transcription(s)
  - Arabic: عين يبرود
  - Latin: 'Ein Yabrud (official); Ayn Yabrood (unofficial)
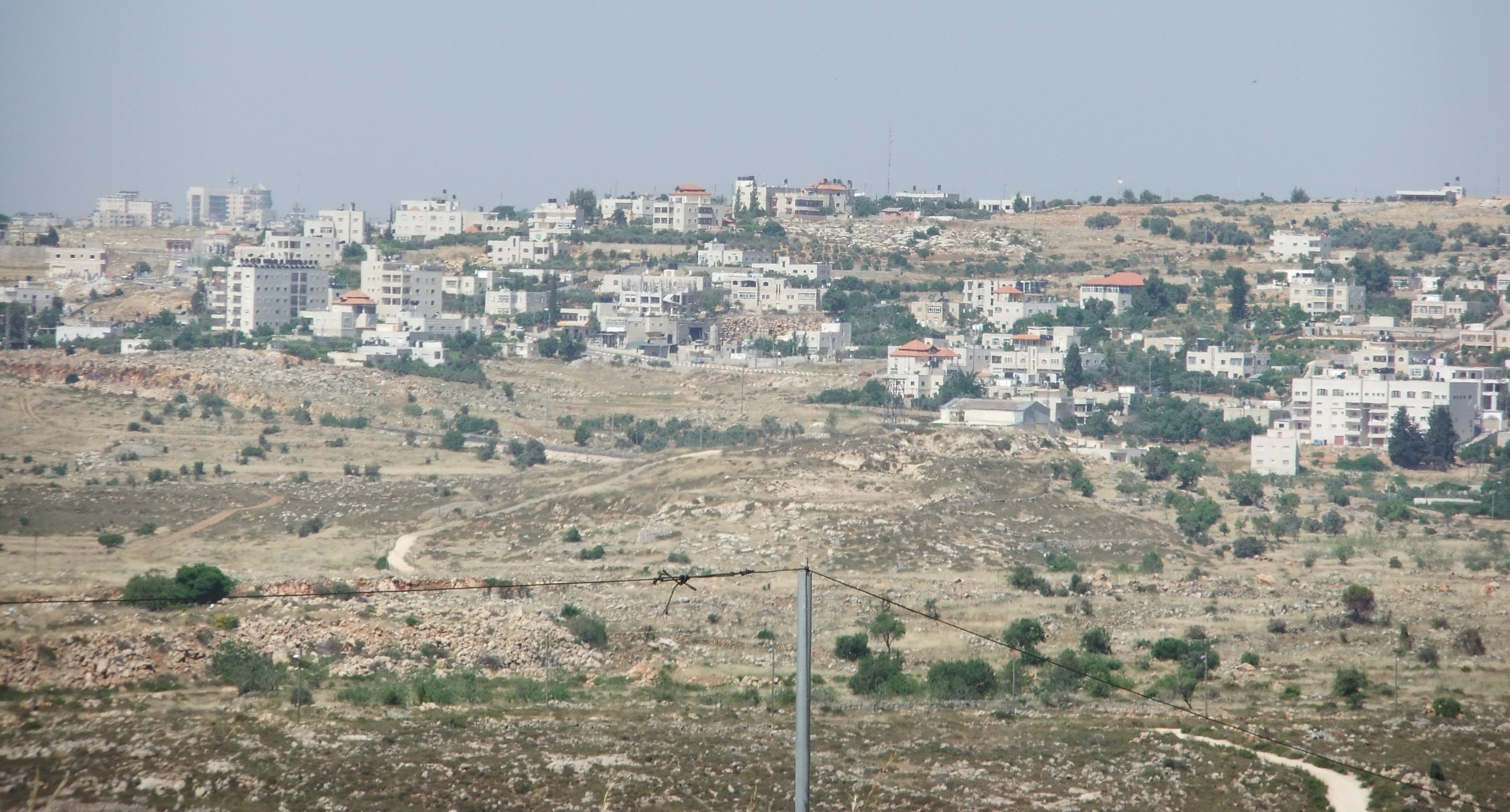

- Location of Ein Yabrud
- Coordinates: 31°56′51″N 35°14′55″E
- Palestine grid: 173/151
- State: State of Palestine
- Governorate: Ramallah and al-Bireh

Government
  - Type: Municipality
  - Head of Municipality: Awni Hasan Sha'ib

Area
  - Total: 11.5 km^{2} (4.4 sq mi)

Population (2017)
  - Total: 2,515
  - Density: 219/km^{2} (566/sq mi)
- Name meaning: The spring of Yebrud

Ein Yabrud (Arabic: عين يبرود) is a Palestinian town in the Ramallah and al-Bireh Governorate in the central West Bank. It is located approximately 7 km northeast of the city of Ramallah and its elevation is 800 m. According to the Palestinian Central Bureau of Statistics (PCBS) the town had a population of 2,515 in 2017.

== Location ==
Ein Yabrud is located (horizontally) 6.8 kilometers (4.2 mi) west of Ramallah. It is bordered by Rammun and Taybeh to the east, Yabrud and Silwad to the north, Dura al-Qar' to the west, and Deir Dibwan, Beitin and Al-Bireh to the south.

== History ==
Sherds from the Hellenistic, Roman and Byzantine eras have been found here. A grave, with three arcosolia, and with coins from the reign of Constantine the Great have been excavated here. Sherds from the Umayyad, Crusader/Ayyubid and Mamluk eras have also been found. According to historian Yossef Rapoport, Ein Yabrud was continuously inhabited since the Hellenistic period.

=== Ayyubid and Mamluk periods ===
The geographer Yaqut al-Hamawi noted about Ein Yabrud in 1226, during Ayyubid rule (1187–1260), that it was "a village lying north of Jerusalem, on the road from the Holy City to Nabulus, between which and Yabrud is Kafar Natha. It possesses orchards and vineyards, and olives and Sumach trees." Half of the village at that time belonged to a waqf (religious endowment) for the benefit of the Haram al-Sharif (Temple Mount) in Jerusalem and the other half to a madrasa (Islamic school).

Ein Yabrud was mentioned in two documents found in a corpus stored in Jerusalem dating to the first decade of the 14th century, during Mamluk rule (1260–1516). The waqf to which three-quarters of Ein Yabrud's revenues were allotted was for the benefit of the Haram al-Sharif, as it had been during Ayyubid rule. The first document, from November 1306, records the sale of olive oil to the waqf by two villagers belonging to the family of Banu Amir for the sum of 1,400 dirhams, which they were to share equally among themselves and a third villager, Musa ibn Qasim ibn Isma'il. The second document, dated September 1307, identifies one of the two aforementioned villagers of the Banu Amir as a ra'is (headman) and the second as the son of a ra'is; altogether the second document names twenty-five residents, mostly fellahin (peasants), of Ein Yabrud, divided into five groups, at the head of each was a ra'is. Each ra'is was a mutual guarantor of the other's obligations.

=== Ottoman period ===
Palestine was incorporated into the Ottoman Empire in 1517, and Ein Yabrud ('Ayn Ibrud') was listed in the Ottoman tax register of 1596 as being in the Nahiya of Quds (Jerusalem) of the Liwa of Quds. The population was 24 households, all Muslim. The villagers paid a fixed tax rate of 33.3% on various agricultural products, such as wheat, barley, olive trees, vineyards, fruit trees, goats and/or beehives, in addition to "occasional revenues"; a total of 8,700 akçe.

In 1838, Edward Robinson noted Ein Yabrud was located "on the top of a hill". It was further noted as a Muslim village, located in the Bani Murra district, north of Jerusalem. In 1863 Victor Guérin found it to have 800 inhabitants and a number of houses were built with antique materials. Socin found from an official Ottoman village list from about 1870 that the village had 66 houses and a population of 282, though the population count only included men. It was further noted that it was located one hour north of Beitin. In 1882 the PEF's Survey of Western Palestine (SWP) described Ein Yabrud as: "A village of moderate size on the top of a hill, well built, surrounded with fine groves of olives, with a well on the north-east." In 1896 the population of Ein Yabrud was estimated to be about 573 persons.

=== British Mandate period ===
In the 1922 census of Palestine, conducted by the British Mandate authorities, the population numbered 576 Muslims, increasing in the 1931 census to 788 inhabitants, in 178 houses. In the 1945 statistics Ein Yabrud had a population of 930 Muslims, and a total land area of 11,488 dunams. 3,151 dunams were for plantations and irrigable land, 3,632 for cereals, while 88 dunams were built-up areas.

=== Jordanian period ===
In the wake of the 1948 Arab–Israeli War, and after the 1949 Armistice Agreements, Ein Yabrud came under Jordanian rule. Jordan confiscated lands of Ein Yabrud and nearby Silwad for the construction of a military camp before the Six-Day War.

The Jordanian census of 1961 found 1,501 inhabitants in Ein Yabrud.

=== Post-1967 ===
Since the Six-Day War in 1967, Ein Yabrud has been under Israeli occupation.

After the 1995 accords, 34.3% of village land is classified as Area B land, while the remaining 65.7% is classified as Area C. Israel has confiscated land from Ein Yarbrud for two settlements: 1,252 dunams for Ofra and 137 dunams for Beit El.

The Jordanian buildings formed the initial basis of the Israeli settlement of Ofra founded in 1975. Plans for further expansion of Ofra in this land in 2011 resulted in legal challenges and public dispute. Land belonging to the residents of the village has been used to construct hundreds of structures in the neighbouring Israeli settlement of Ofra.

Ein Yabrud is the home village of Hamas military commander Maher Udda.

== Bibliography ==
- Barron, J.B., ed. (1923). Palestine: Report and General Abstracts of the Census of 1922. Government of Palestine.
- Conder, C.R.; Kitchener, H.H. (1882). The Survey of Western Palestine: Memoirs of the Topography, Orography, Hydrography, and Archaeology. Vol. 2. London: Committee of the Palestine Exploration Fund.
- Dauphin, C. (1998). La Palestine byzantine, Peuplement et Populations. BAR International Series 726 (in French). Vol. III : Catalogue. Oxford: Archeopress. ISBN 0-860549-05-4.
- Finkelstein, I.; Lederman, Zvi, eds. (1997). Highlands of many cultures. Tel Aviv: Institute of Archaeology of Tel Aviv University Publications Section. ISBN 965-440-007-3.
- Government of Jordan, Department of Statistics (1964). First Census of Population and Housing. Volume I: Final Tables; General Characteristics of the Population (PDF).
- Government of Palestine, Department of Statistics (1945). Village Statistics, April, 1945.
- Guérin, V. (1869). Description Géographique Historique et Archéologique de la Palestine (in French). Vol. 1: Judee, pt. 3. Paris: L'Imprimerie Nationale.
- Hadawi, S. (1970). Village Statistics of 1945: A Classification of Land and Area ownership in Palestine. Palestine Liberation Organization Research Center.
- Hartmann, M. (1883). "Die Ortschaftenliste des Liwa Jerusalem in dem türkischen Staatskalender für Syrien auf das Jahr 1288 der Flucht (1871)". Zeitschrift des Deutschen Palästina-Vereins. 6: 102–149.
- Hütteroth, W.-D.; Abdulfattah, K. (1977). Historical Geography of Palestine, Transjordan and Southern Syria in the Late 16th Century. Erlanger Geographische Arbeiten, Sonderband 5. Erlangen, Germany: Vorstand der Fränkischen Geographischen Gesellschaft. ISBN 3-920405-41-2.
- Le Strange, G. (1890). Palestine Under the Moslems: A Description of Syria and the Holy Land from A.D. 650 to 1500. Committee of the Palestine Exploration Fund.
- Mills, E., ed. (1932). Census of Palestine 1931. Population of Villages, Towns and Administrative Areas. Jerusalem: Government of Palestine.
- Palmer, E.H. (1881). The Survey of Western Palestine: Arabic and English Name Lists Collected During the Survey by Lieutenants Conder and Kitchener, R. E. Transliterated and Explained by E.H. Palmer. Committee of the Palestine Exploration Fund.
- Rapoport, Yossef (2025). Becoming Arab: The Formation of Arab Identity in the Medieval Middle East. Princeton: Princeton University Press. ISBN 9780691210636.
- Robinson, E.; Smith, E. (1841). Biblical Researches in Palestine, Mount Sinai and Arabia Petraea: A Journal of Travels in the year 1838. Vol. 2. Boston: Crocker & Brewster.
- Robinson, E.; Smith, E. (1841). Biblical Researches in Palestine, Mount Sinai and Arabia Petraea: A Journal of Travels in the year 1838. Vol. 3. Boston: Crocker & Brewster.
- Schick, C. (1896). "Zur Einwohnerzahl des Bezirks Jerusalem". Zeitschrift des Deutschen Palästina-Vereins. 19: 120–127.
- Socin, A. (1879). "Alphabetisches Verzeichniss von Ortschaften des Paschalik Jerusalem". Zeitschrift des Deutschen Palästina-Vereins. 2: 135–163.
- Toledano, E. (1984). "The Sanjaq of Jerusalem in the Sixteenth Century: Aspects of Topography and Population". Archivum Ottomanicum. 9: 279–319. Archived from the original on 2016-03-05.
