= Jerusalem conference in New York =

Annual Arutz Sheva conference held in New York City

Jerusalem Conference in New York כנס ירושלים בניו יורק
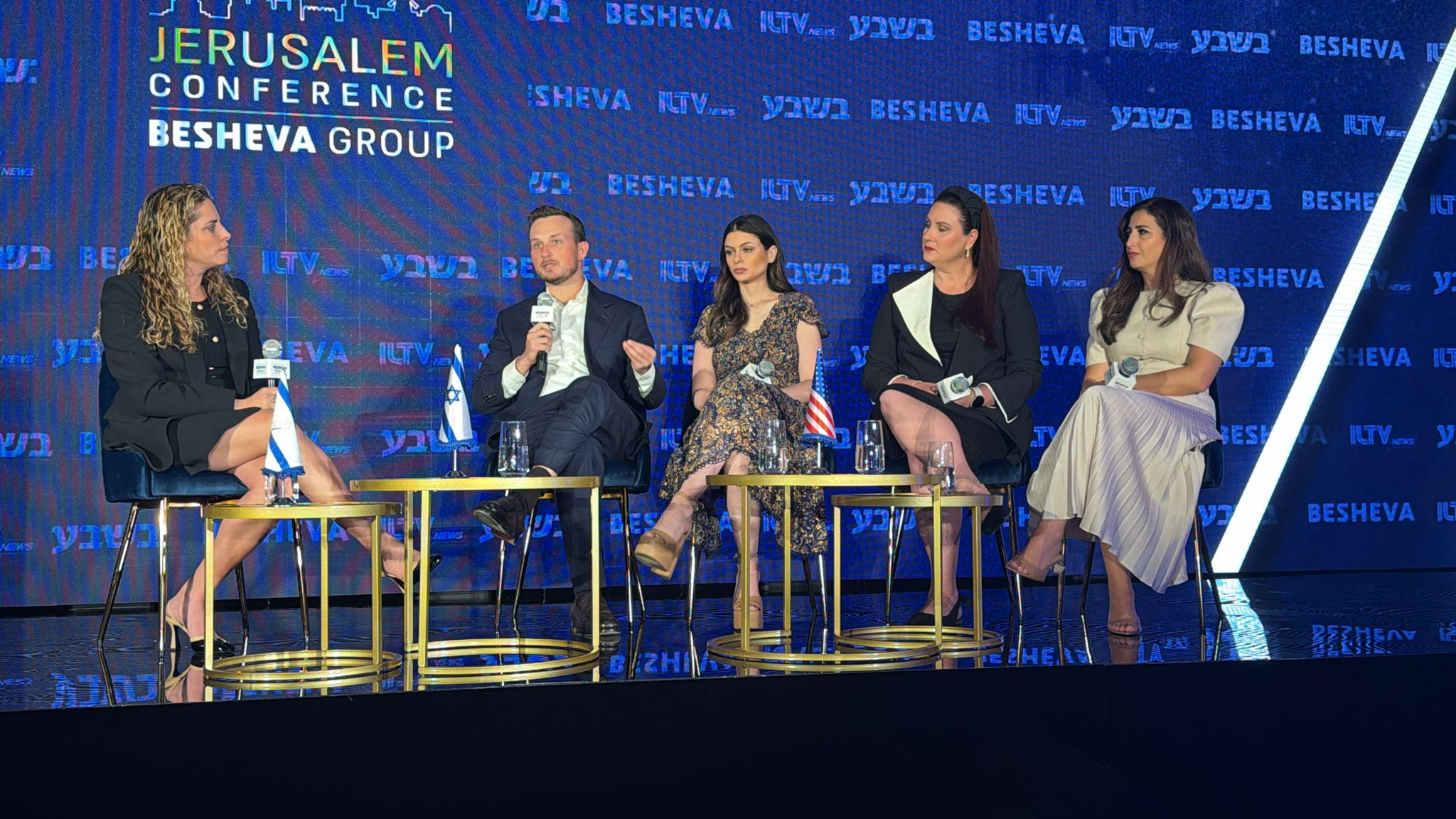
- Witkoff, Falik, Popko, Rosenfeld and Lebayev at a Jewish leadership panel
- Genre: Jewish community and political conference
- Frequency: Annual
- Locations: New York City, United States
- Country: United States
- Inaugurated: 2022
- Organizer: B'Sheva'
- Sponsor: Sheva (Besheva) media group

The Jerusalem Conference in New York (Hebrew: כנס ירושלים בניו יורק) is an annual conference held in New York City on the initiative of the newspaper B'Sheva and Arutz Sheva, with the aim of strengthening ties between the State of Israel and Diaspora Jewry. It is an offshoot of the "Jerusalem Conference" held in Israel since the early 2000s, adapted for a North American Jewish audience, and is held in conjunction with the city's annual Israel parade. The conference addresses topics such as Jewish identity, aliyah, combating antisemitism, Israel–Diaspora relations and challenges facing Israeli society. During each event, "Jerusalem Prizes" are awarded to individuals and organizations for their public contributions in these areas; the award is distinct from the literary Jerusalem Prize.

== 2022 ==
The first conference was held in May 2022 at the InterContinental Times Square hotel in Manhattan, timed to coincide with the city's annual Celebrate Israel Parade. Participants included Israeli ministers, Knesset members, rabbis, ambassadors and local Jewish community figures, among them UN ambassador Gilad Erdan and officials of the World Zionist Organization and Jewish Agency. Topics discussed included strengthening Jewish identity, combating antisemitism and the BDS movement, encouraging aliyah, and Israel–Diaspora relations. The inaugural Jerusalem Prize, for the development of Judea and Samaria, was presented to the Falic family for their support of Jewish settlements in the area.

== 2023 ==
The second conference was held in June 2023 at the New York Hilton Midtown in Manhattan, marking the 75th anniversary of the establishment of the State of Israel. Participants included government representatives, Israeli settlement leaders, media personalities, and American Jewish leaders, with the event opening with a speech by Israeli minister Meir Porush. The program centered on Israeli-diaspora relations and the promotion of settlements within the West Bank, including East Jerusalem. Outside the venue, hundreds of demonstrators gathered for a protest organized by UnXeptable to oppose the Israeli government's judicial reform. The Jerusalem Award was presented to the Orthodox kashrut-certification agency OU Kosher.

== 2024 ==
The third conference took place on 2 June 2024, following the Celebrate Israel Parade, with a focus on the Gaza war and on recognizing those who had come to Israel's defense after the October 7 attacks. Participants included ministers, Knesset members, mayors, IDF reserve officers and members of bereaved families. New York City Mayor Eric Adams received the Jerusalem Prize and delivered an address, while former US ambassador to Israel David M. Friedman, the event's honorary chairman, received a special prize.

== 2025 ==
The fourth conference was held on 18 May 2025 at the Fifth Avenue Synagogue in Manhattan, following the city's Israel parade. Participants included ministers, Knesset members, spiritual leaders and heads of Jewish organizations from Israel and the United States, among them Jerusalem Mayor Moshe Lion, Consul-General Ofir Akunis, and Columbia University assistant professor Shai Davidai, who was honored for his pro-Israel campus activism. Freed hostages and relatives of captives also addressed the conference, which focused on Jewish identity, mutual responsibility and the Gaza war.

== 2026 ==
The fifth conference was held in New York as the culmination of a week of events surrounding the city's annual "Israel Day on Fifth" parade which took place on 31 May 2026.

== Gallery ==
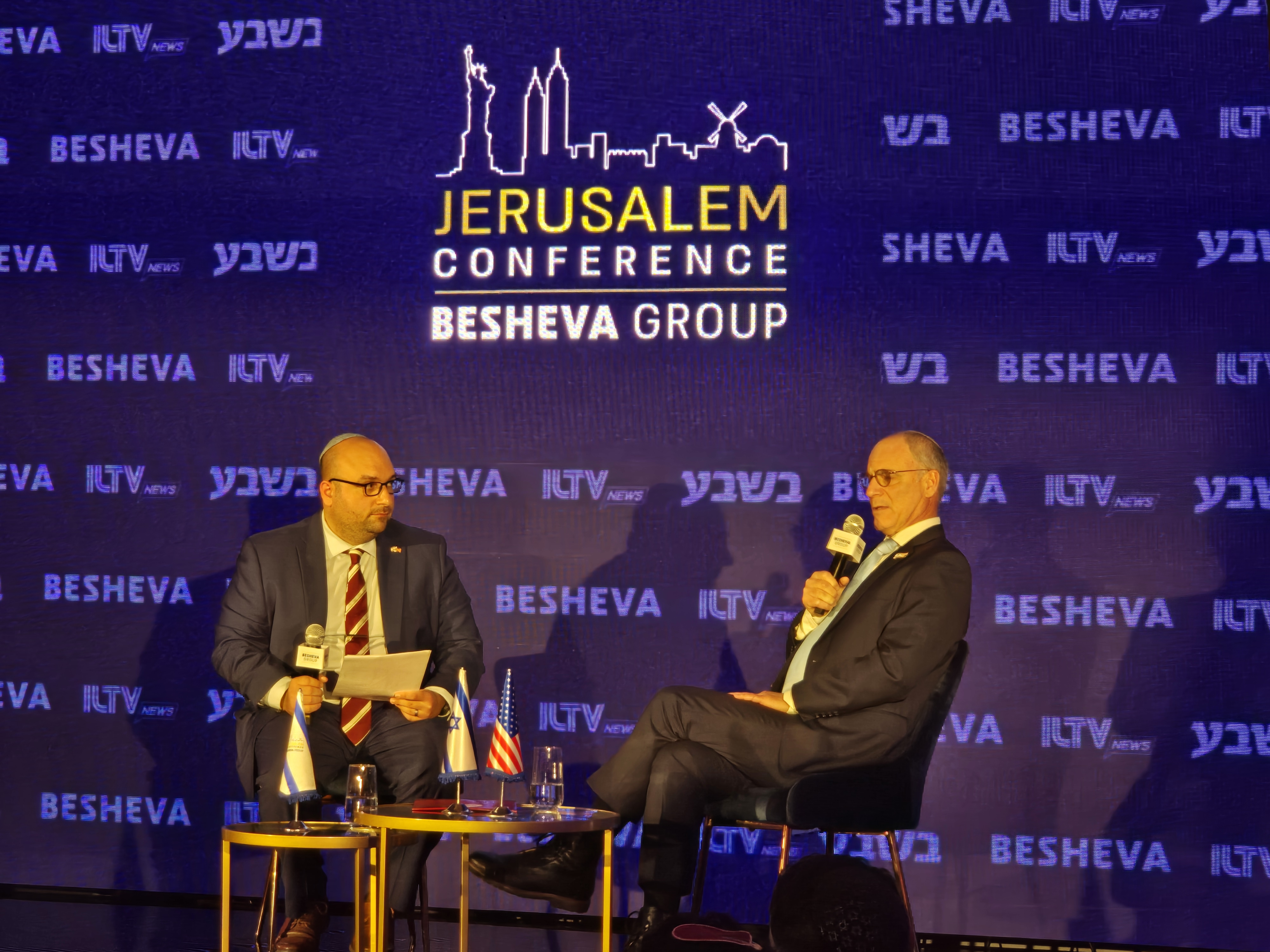

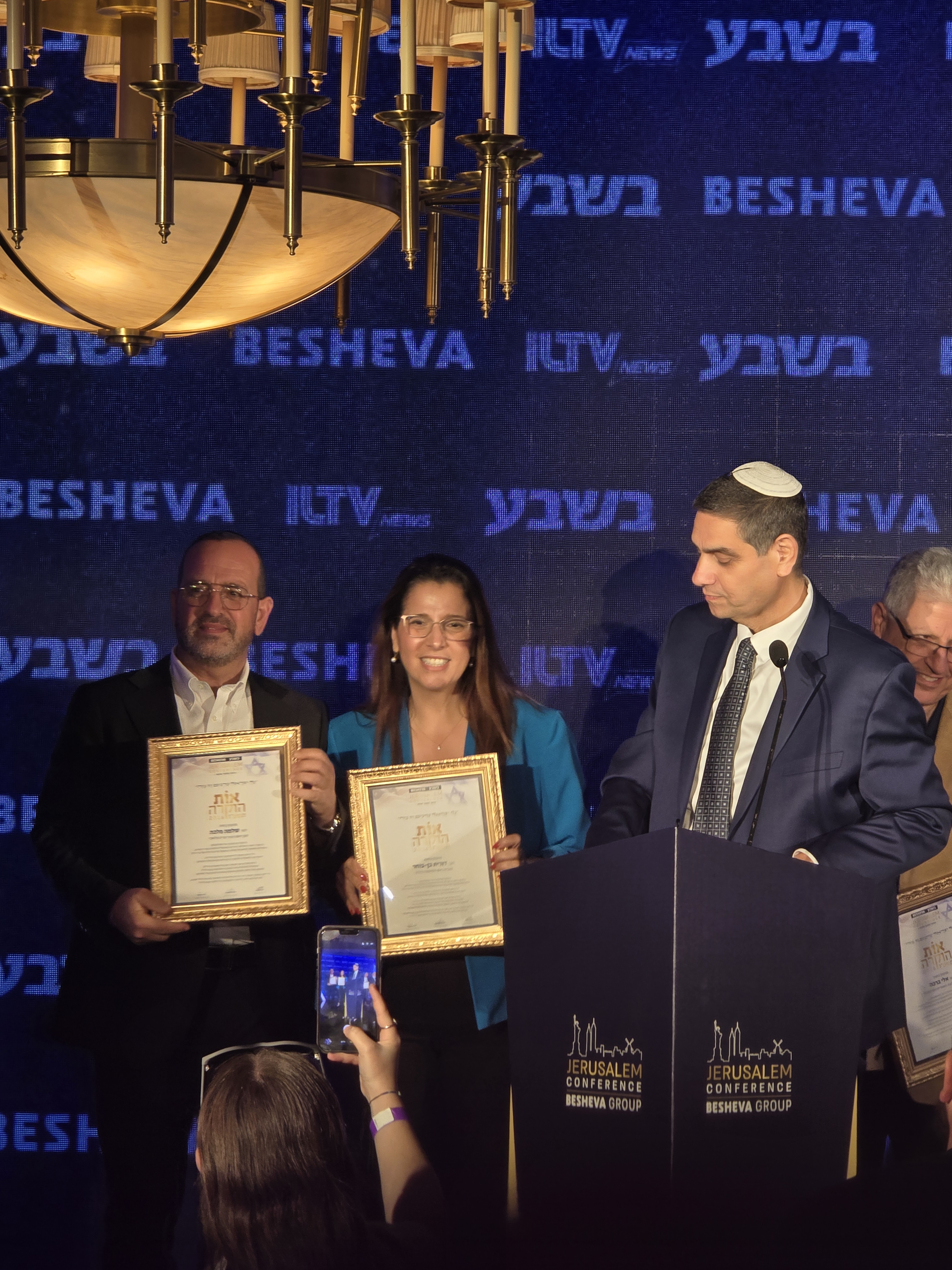

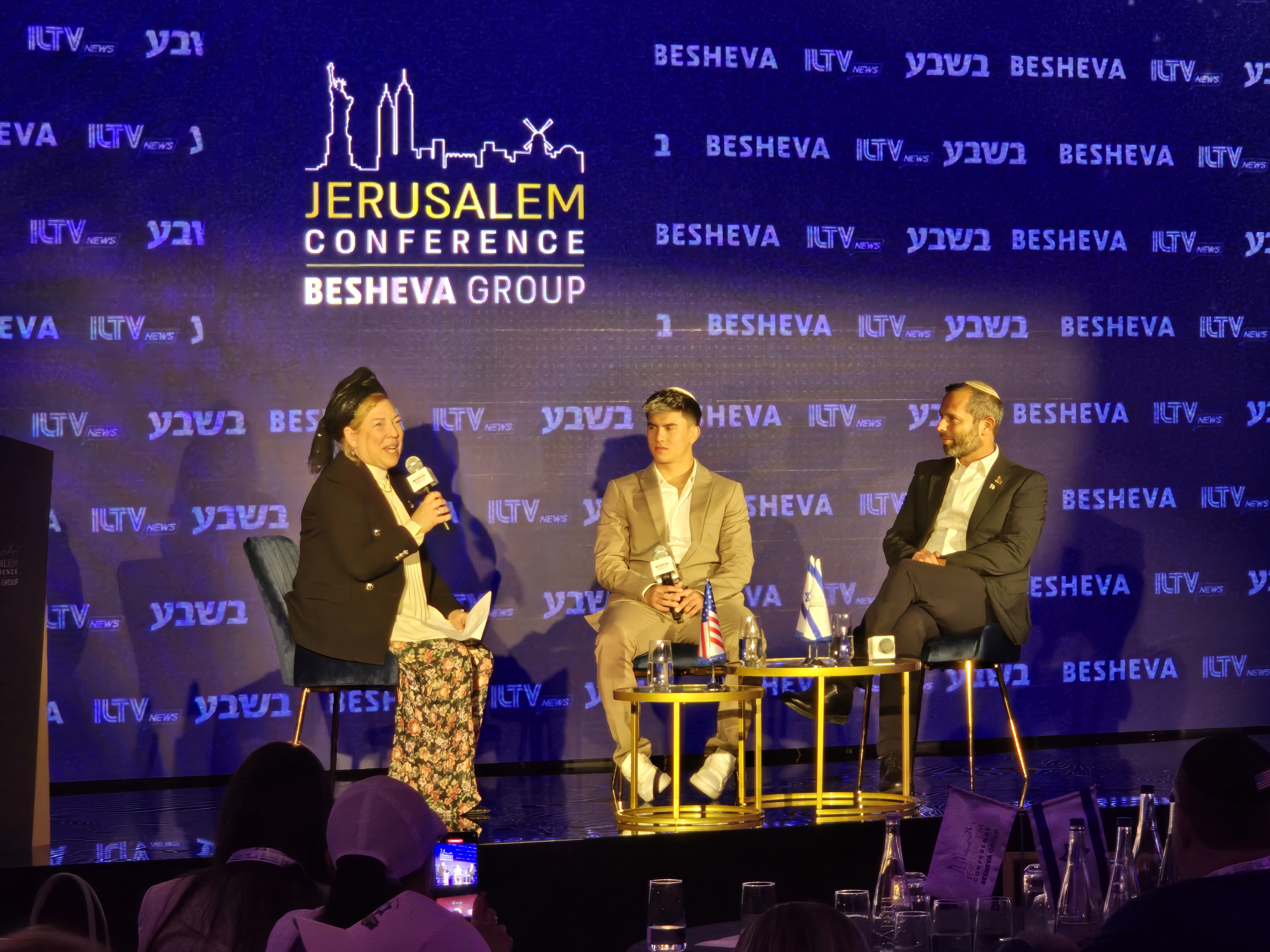

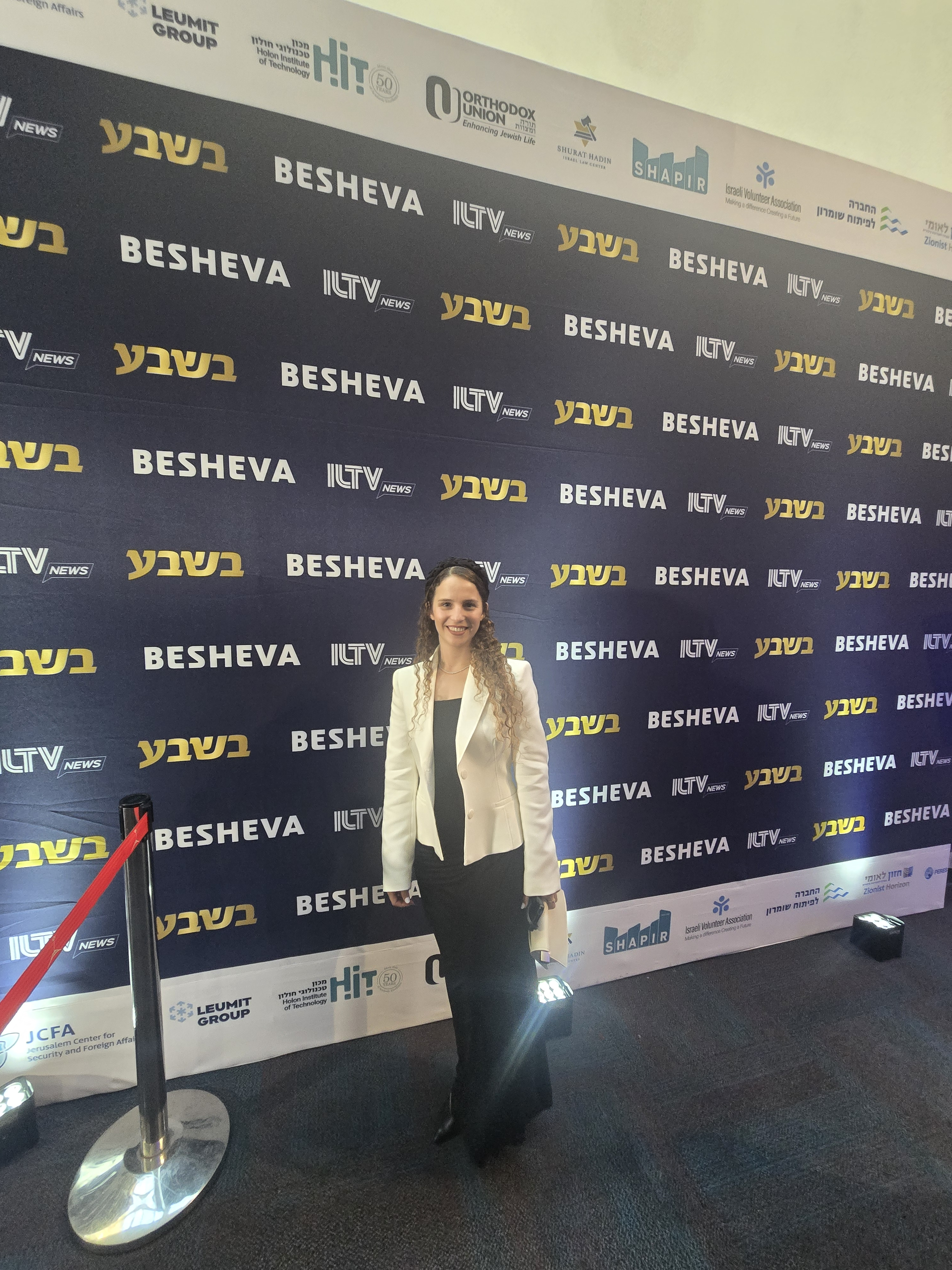

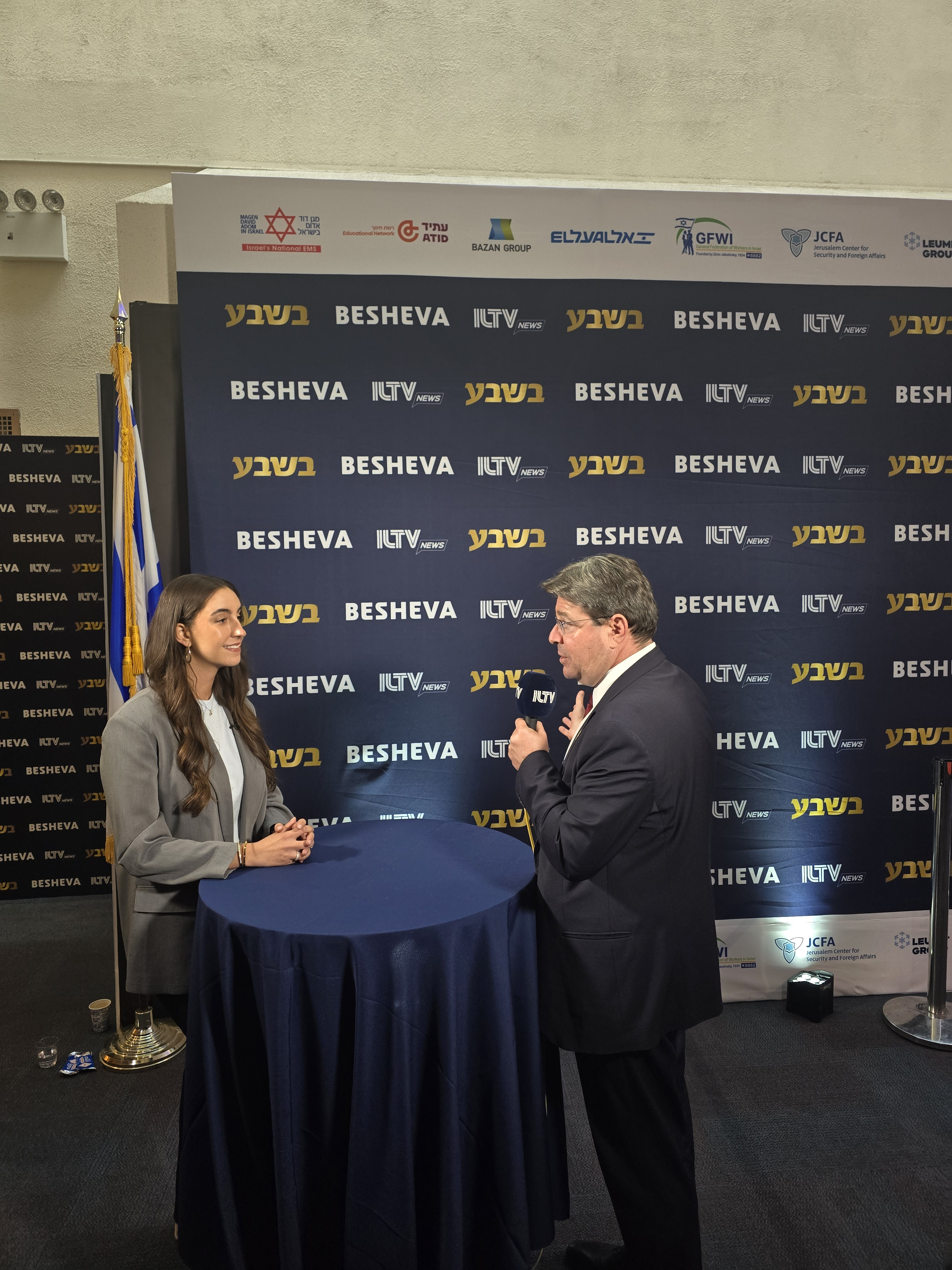

== See also ==
- Arutz Sheva
- B'Sheva
