= Dudu Saada =

Israeli media executive and radio host (born 1967)

- דודו סעדה
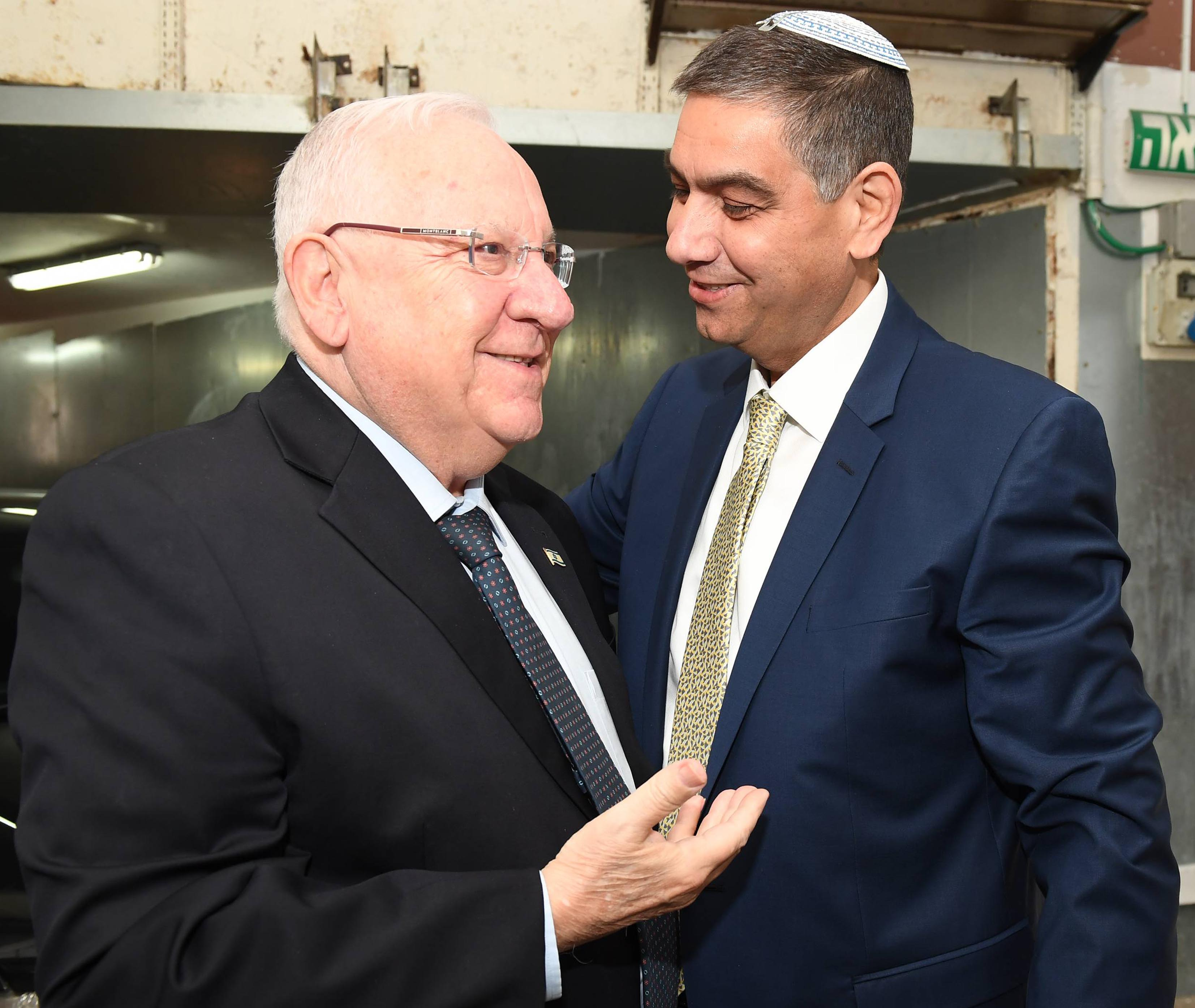
- Saada with Israeli President Reuven Rivlin at the opening of the 15th Jerusalem Conference of the B'Sheva group, February 2018
- Born: 1967 (age 58–59)
- Occupations: Media executive; radio host; businessman
- Spouse: Hagit
- Children: 3

David "Dudu" Saada (Hebrew: דודו סעדה; born 1967) is an Israeli media executive, radio host and businessman. He is the chairman of the "B'Sheva" group, which includes the B'Sheva newspaper and the Jerusalem Conference.

== Biography ==
Saada was born to Ines and Eliyahu, one of nine children, and grew up in the Shikun Heh neighborhood of Bnei Brak until the age of 18. He was a counselor in the Bnei Akiva youth movement.

He studied at the yeshiva high school in Ra'anana and afterwards at Yeshivat Shilo. He was conscripted into the Israel Defense Forces and served in the Givati Brigade. He later married Hagit.

During the first two years of his marriage he served as a counselor and teacher at the vocational yeshiva in Gan Yavne, where he also lived, while completing a bachelor's degree in education at the Moreshet Yaakov College in Rehovot. He then moved to the settlement of Kedumim and worked as an educator at the local elementary school. He subsequently left Kedumim for Ma'alot, where he served as head of the education administration at the local education campus.

After five years in Ma'alot he returned to Kedumim and served as principal of the Har Bracha hesder yeshiva. During his tenure he established the yeshiva's "integration" program, combining Torah study with a degree at Ariel University. This and other projects he promoted helped grow the settlement from 43 families to 500 families within a decade.

Saada sought election to the Knesset in 2003, and was assigned the 11th slot on the National Union's electoral list. He was not elected.

Alongside the growth of the yeshiva in Har Bracha, he completed a bachelor's degree in business administration at the University of Haifa and managed the marketing department of Arutz Sheva radio, a role that also made him responsible for the establishment of a new newspaper, B'Sheva, and other departments of the group.

Saada serves as chairman of the "B'Sheva" group, which includes the Religious Zionist newspaper B'Sheva, distributed weekly in about 130,000 copies throughout Israel, and the conferences department that produces the annual Jerusalem Conference, attended by thousands, as well as additional conferences.

He previously hosted a radio program on Kol Chai called "Shetach Sarug".

In June 2016 he began hosting a weekly program on Reshet Bet of Kol Yisrael together with Ilanit Suissa.

He also writes opinion columns, some of which are published in the B'Sheva newspaper and on Arutz Sheva.

In the past he managed numerous campaigns, including the candidacy of Rabbi Shmuel Eliyahu for the position of Chief Rabbi.

He is also a businessman and the owner of several companies.

In 2001 (5761 in the Hebrew calendar), a shooting attack was carried out against him; Saada survived the attack unharmed.

== Personal life ==
Saada is married to Hagit and lives in the Kfar Ganim neighborhood of Petah Tikva. The couple has three children.
