= Arutz Sheva =

Israeli media network identifying with religious Zionism

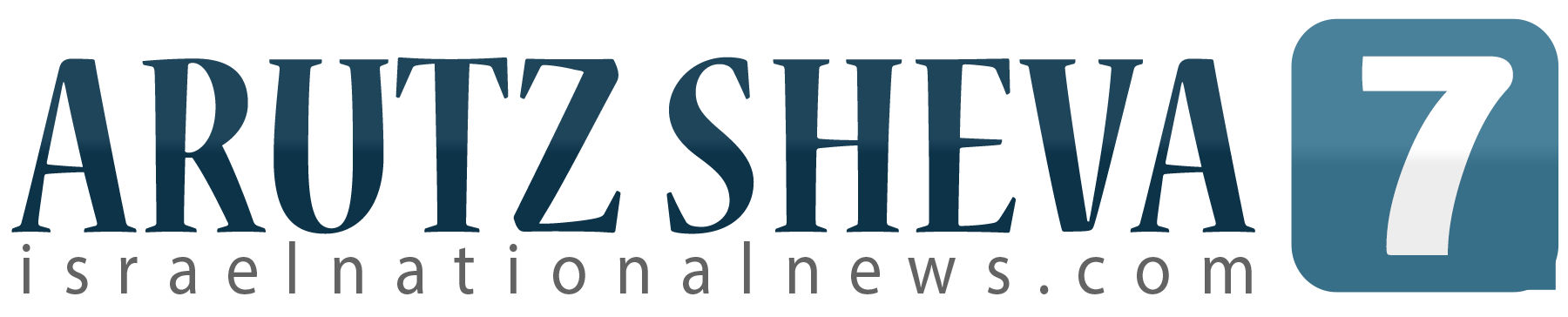
- Native name: ערוץ 7
- Industry: Mass media
- Founded: October 1988; 37 years ago
- Founder: Zalman Baruch Melamed
- Headquarters: Beit El, West Bank
- Key people: Ya'akov Katz (Chairman)
- Owner: HolyLand Holdings Ltd
- Parent: Beit El yeshiva
- Subsidiaries: B'Sheva
- Website: israelnationalnews.com

Arutz Sheva (Hebrew: ערוץ 7, lit. 'Channel 7'), also known in English as Israel National News, is an Israeli media network identifying with religious Zionism. It offers online news articles in Hebrew, Arabic, English, and Russian as well as live streaming radio, video and free podcasts. It also publishes a weekly newspaper, B'Sheva, with the third-largest weekend circulation in the country.

== History ==
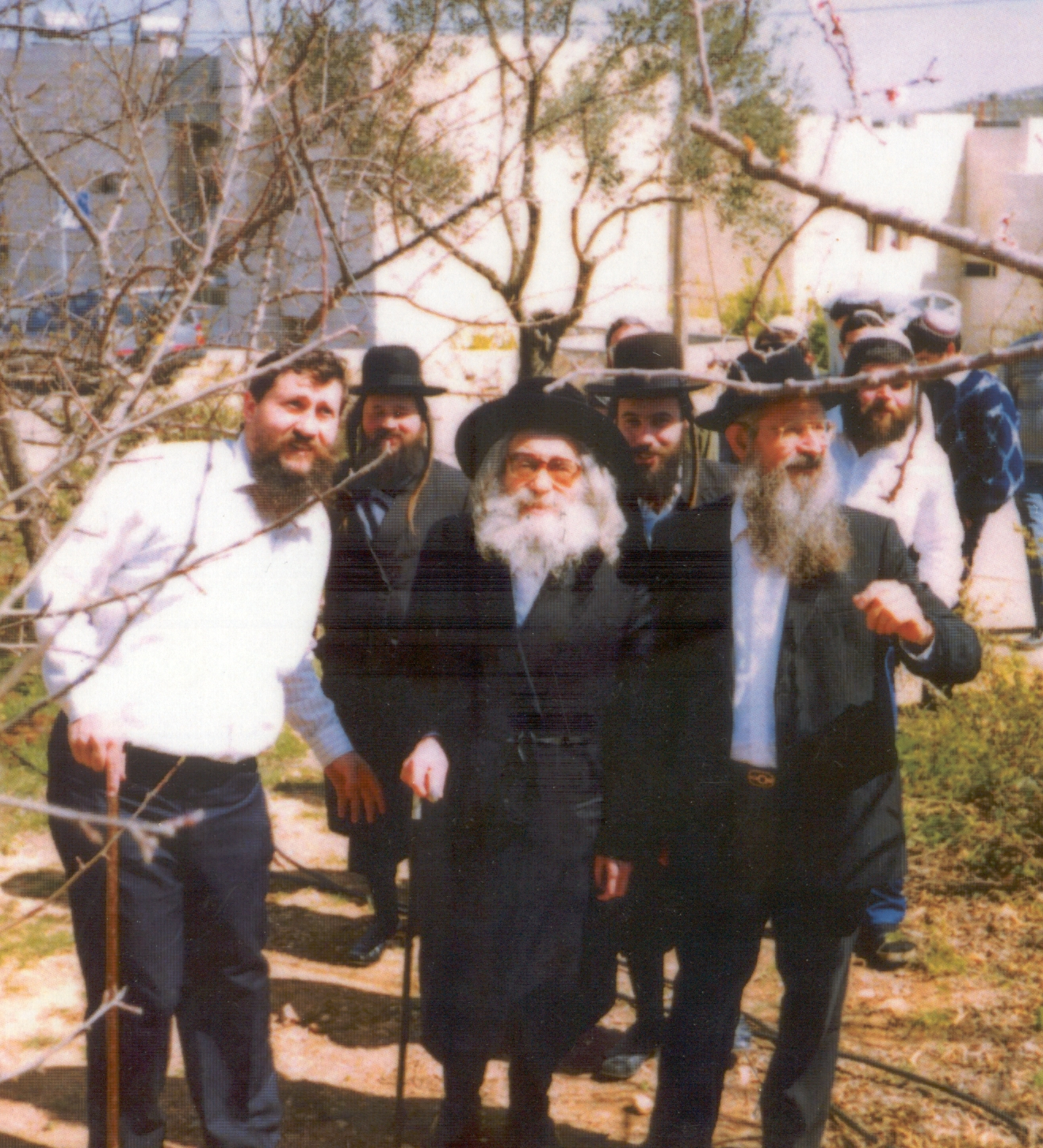
Arutz Sheva Chairman Ya'akov Katz (front left) and founder Zalman Baruch Melamed (front right) during a visit of Rebbe Pinchas Menachem Alter (center) to Beit El in 1990

In the 1970s an offshore radio station Voice of Peace was launched, broadcasting pacifistic messages. In response, Rabbi Zalman Baruch Melamed launched radio station Arutz Sheva in 1988, aimed at Israelis opposed to negotiations with the Palestine Liberation Organization. Based in Beit El, the station generated its broadcast on the Israeli airwaves from the ship MV Eretz HaTzvi in the Mediterranean Sea. It was one of the first Internet radio stations and was used as a beta tester for RealPlayer. From 1996 to 2002, Arutz Sheva broadcast in Russian. In 2003, Arutz Sheva ceased its radio operations after attempts to legalize it were unsuccessful.

In 2020, Reuters reported that Arutz Sheva along with Algemeiner, The Times of Israel and The Jerusalem Post had published op-eds written under a false identity. The supposed author, Oliver Taylor, was an "elaborate fiction".

== Legal dispute ==
In February 1999, the Knesset passed a law granting a license to Arutz Sheva and absolving it of earlier illegal broadcasting, but this was appealed to the Supreme Court of Israel, which ruled the law null and void in March 2002. In October 2003, ten employees of Arutz Sheva were convicted of operating an illegal radio station during the period 1995–98, both from inside Israeli territorial waters and from Beit El. The defendants were fined and sentenced to 3–6 months of community service. The prosecution appealed, attempting to get heavier sentences, but were strongly criticized by the appellate court for their handling of the case, and the prosecution was told to drop the appeal or face an investigation into their conduct during the entire trial. Station director Ya'akov "Katzele" Katz was also convicted on two counts of perjury for having lied about the location of the broadcasts. In 2006, Katz was pardoned by President Moshe Katsav.

== Departments ==
=== Internet ===
Arutz Sheva has been running its website since 1995. Editor-in-chief is Uzi Baruch, who succeeded Baruch Gordon and Hillel Fendel. Today, three versions of the site are offered: Hebrew, English and Russian. It includes news articles, news briefs, videos, op-eds, a Judaism section, opinion polls and caricatures. Arutz Sheva offers online streaming videos in Hebrew and English with news anchor and producer Yoni Kempinski, Knesset reporter Hezki Ezra, overseas correspondent Eliran Aharon and others. Arutz Sheva's jukebox offers a selection of Jewish music including Israeli, Hassidic and Mizrahi songs, as well as music for Jewish holidays and special events.

=== Radio ===
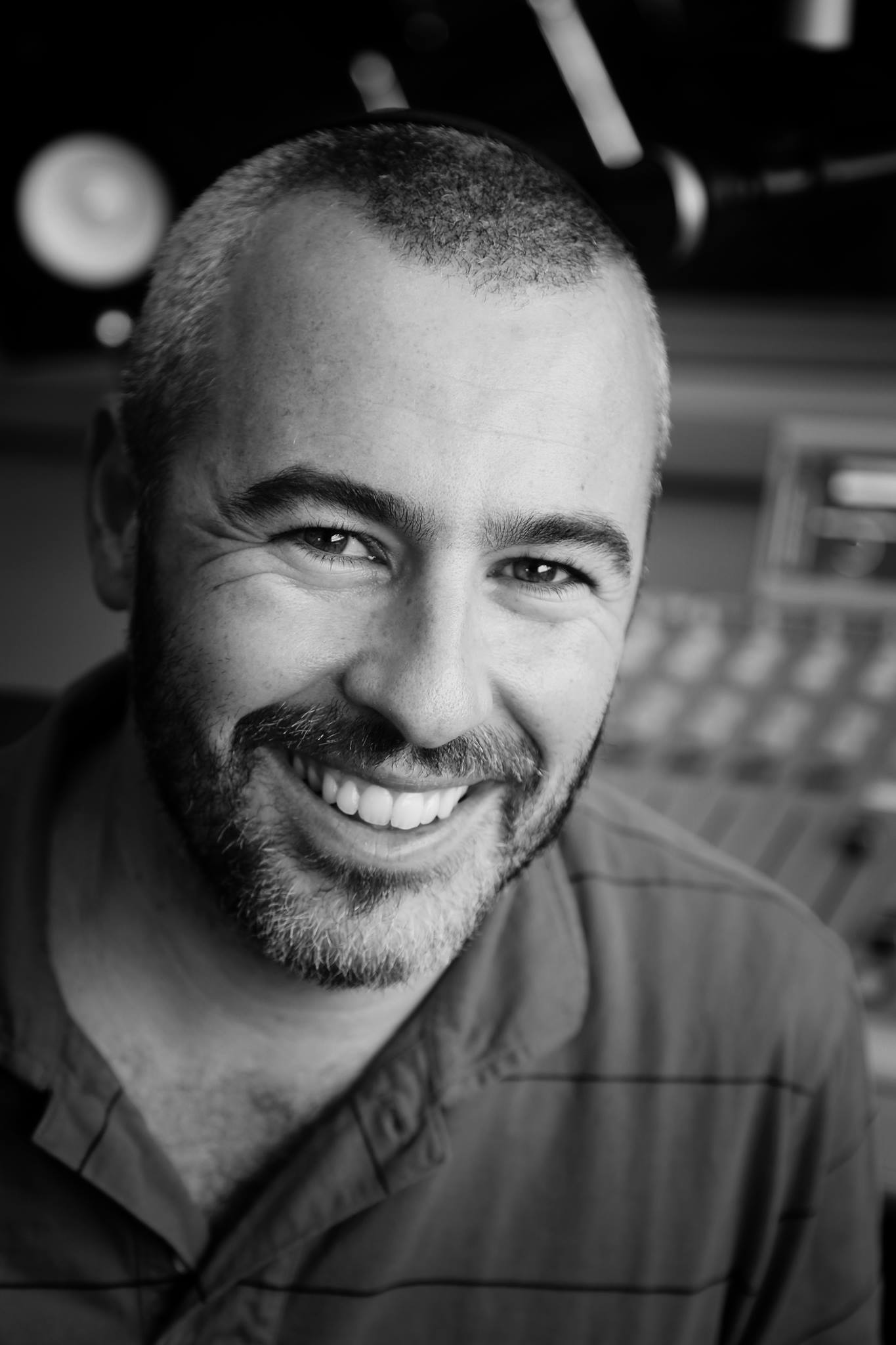
Yishai Fleisher, Arutz Sheva program director from 2003 to 2011

Israel National Radio is Arutz Sheva's English language internet radio station, operating in Beit El. It broadcasts primarily across the Internet, is simulcast on radio stations in the United States, Canada and South Africa, and affirms its purposes as being to spread the word of Israel to Jews and Israel supporters in the English-speaking world as well as Anglophones living in Israel, and to be the archetypal "Light Unto the Nations." During shows, people can phone in on international toll-free numbers or chat with other listeners. The station's slogan is "the largest independent newstalk network in the Middle East."

Israel National Radio is made up of news on the hour and live and pre-recorded podcasts. These shows include current affairs commentaries, general talk shows, music, and Torah programs. The podcasts on the station include Tamar Yonah, Yishai Fleisher, The Struggle (with Yehuda HaKohen), Israel Beat (a music program), Walter's World (with Walter Bingham), Land Minds (with Dovid Wilner and Barnea Selavan), Temple Talk (hosted by Rabbi Chaim Richman), A Light Unto The Nations, The Jay Shapiro Show, Torah Tidbits Audio (with Phil Chernofsky), and The Aliyah Revolution (co-hosted by Go'el Jasper and Daniel Esses).

=== Print ===
B'Sheva is Israel's third most widely read weekly newspaper, with a 6.8% exposure rate, according to the TGI survey. The paper is distributed free to over 150,000 homes.

=== Internet ===
Arutz Sheva has operated an online news website since 1995, making it one of the earliest Israeli media outlets to establish a continuous digital presence. The site is published under the English name Israel National News and is available in three languages: Hebrew, English, and Russian. It features news articles, short news briefs, opinion columns, video content, and sections devoted to Judaism and Israeli society.

== Political stance ==
Arutz Sheva sees itself as a counterbalance to " 'negative thinking' and 'post-Zionist' attitudes." It has been identified with the Israeli settlement movement.

== See also ==
- List of Internet radio stations
- Media of Israel
- Yeshiva.co, another website owned by the Beit El yeshiva
