= Beit El yeshiva =

Israeli Zionist yeshiva in the West Bank

Coordinates: 31°56′32.6″N 35°13′20.77″E

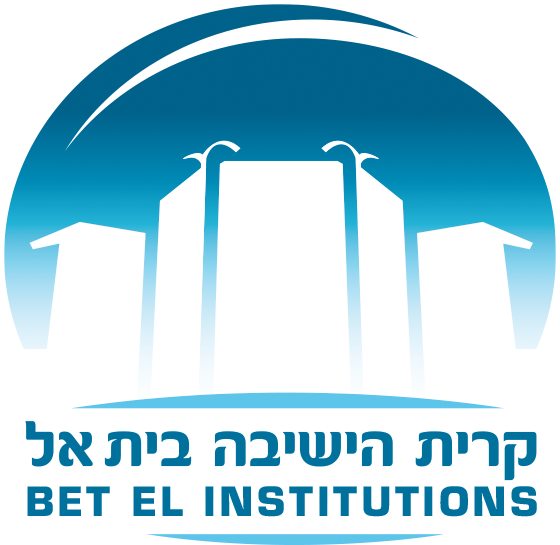

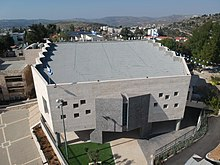
Yeshivat Bet El's new Bet Midrash

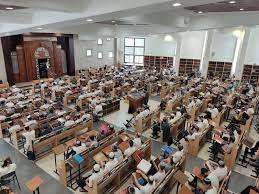
The Rosh Yeshiva delivering a Shiur in the Bet Midrash

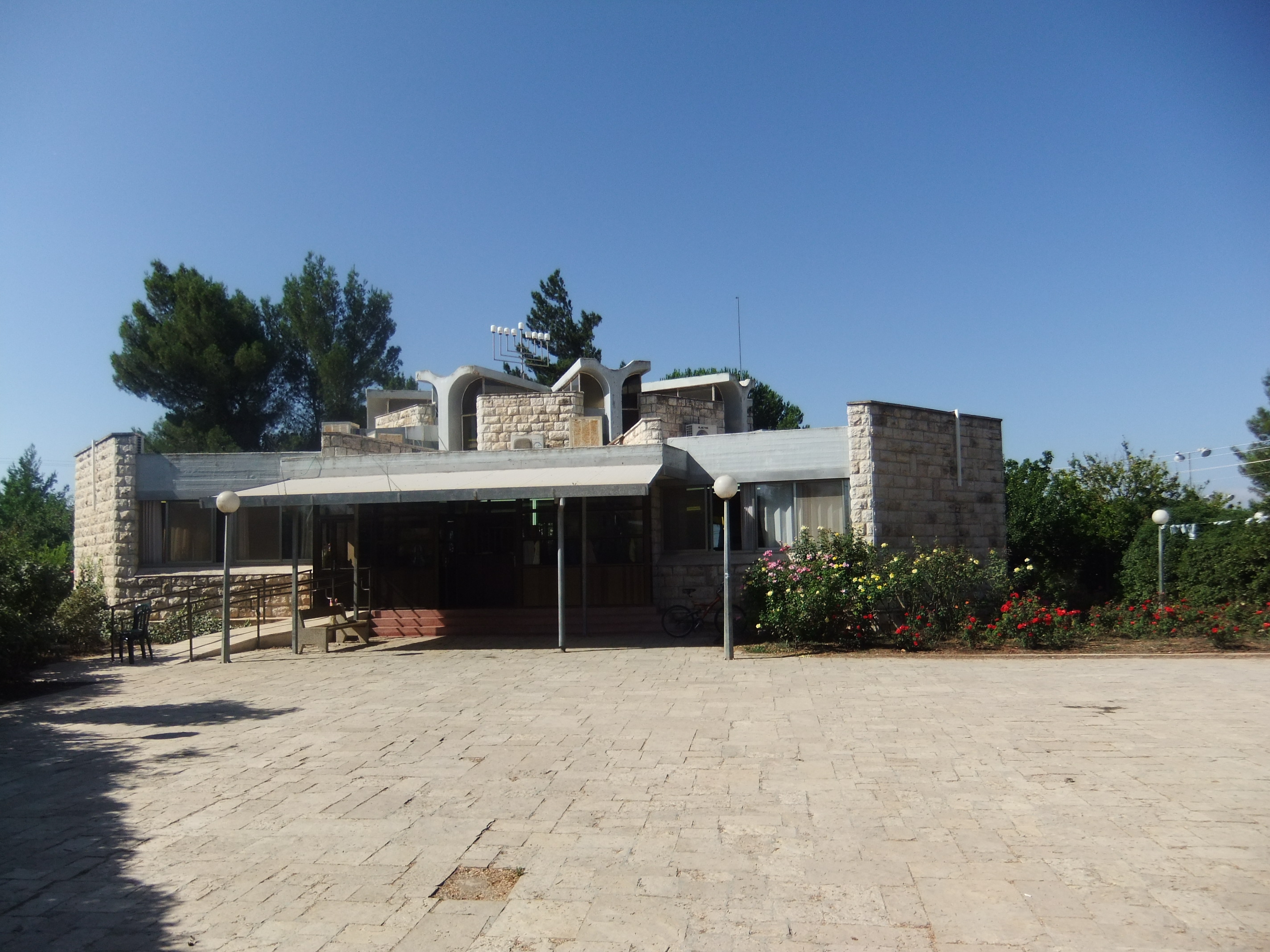
Yeshiva Torah-Web offices

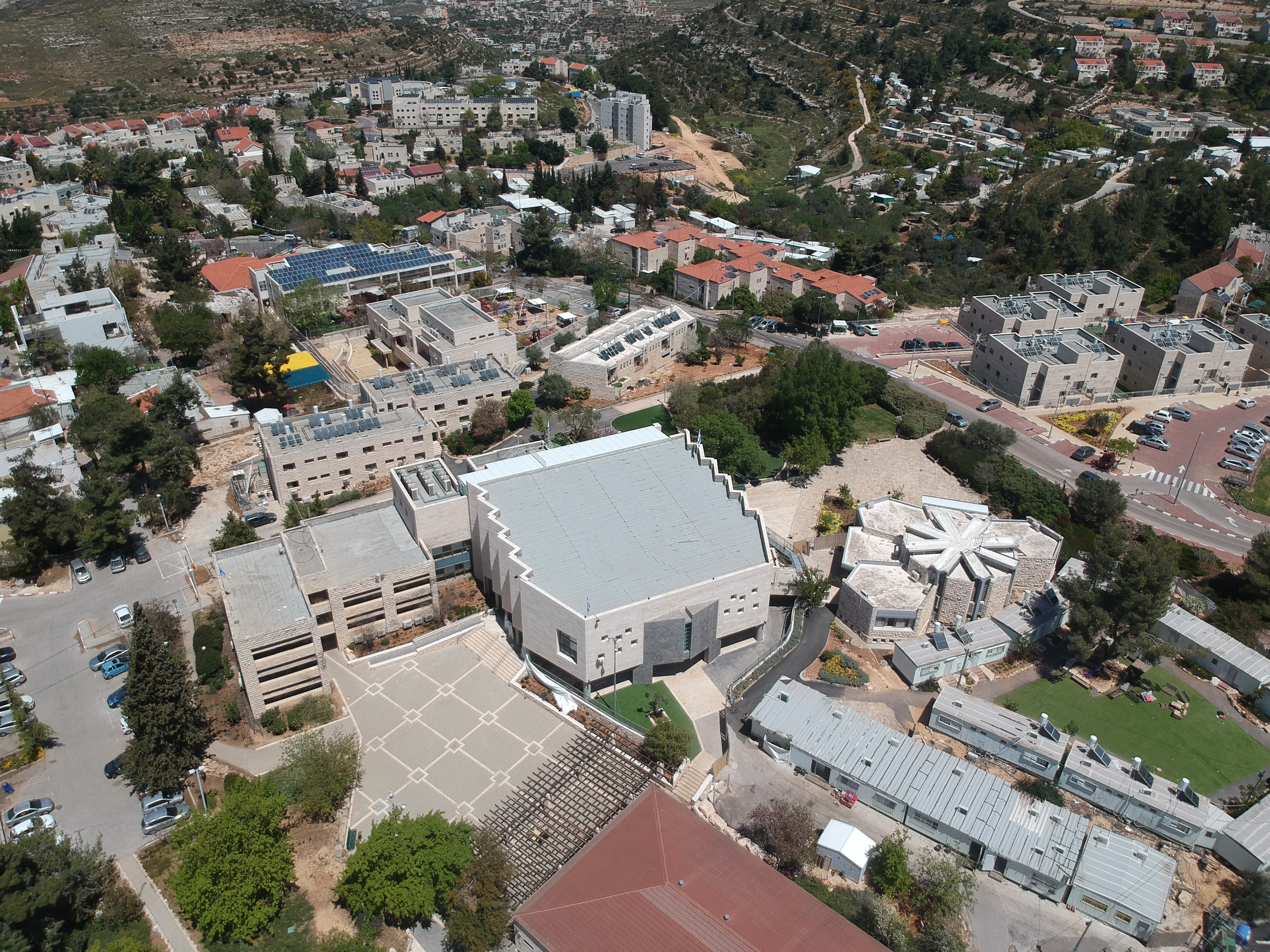
The yeshiva Campus

The Beit El Yeshiva (Hebrew: ישיבת בית אל) is a Religious Zionist Yeshiva situated in the Israeli settlement of Beit El, a community in the Binyamin region near Ramallah in the Israeli-controlled Area C of the West Bank.

== History ==
The Yeshiva was founded in late 1977 by a group of students from the Mercaz haRav yeshiva in Jerusalem. The students originally lived on a nearby army base, but today the yeshiva has its own premises, and over 250 students enrolled. The rosh yeshiva (dean) is Rabbi Zalman Baruch Melamed.

Arutz Sheva - Israel National News was founded and is maintained by the Beit El Yeshiva. The Beit El Yeshiva also founded Yeshiva.co, a large Jewish website.

The Beit El Yeshiva Center also includes:

- A yeshiva (religious studies) high school for boys (junior and senior yeshiva high school), Yeshivat Bnei Zvi, also known as Bnei Zvi Yeshiva Ketana (pre-yeshiva high school; ketana stands for "small")
- An ulpana (religious studies) high school for girls, Ulpanat Ra'aya
- An ulpana high school for girls "with a wide variety of studies", Tal Ra'aya
- A mechina pre-military program for young men
