= Fifth Avenue Synagogue =

Orthodox synagogue in Manhattan, New York

- Hebrew: קהלת עטרת צבי
- The Fifth Avenue Synagogue logo

- Location in Manhattan

Religion
- Affiliation: Orthodox Judaism
- Ecclesiastical or organisational status: Synagogue
- Leadership: Rabbi Eli Babich; Cantor Zak Benarroch
- Status: Active

Location
- Location: 5 East 62nd Street, Upper East Side, Manhattan, New York City, New York
- Country: United States
- Coordinates: 40°45′57″N 73°58′15″W

Architecture
- Architect: Percival Goodman
- Founder: Henry Hirsch; Myrtle Hirsch; Leib Merkin; Hermann Merkin
- Established: 1958 (as a congregation)

Website
- 5as.org

The Fifth Avenue Synagogue (Hebrew: קהלת עטרת צבי, officially Congregation Ateret Tsvi) is an Orthodox Jewish synagogue located at 5 East 62nd Street between Fifth and Madison Avenues on the Upper East Side of Manhattan in New York City, New York, United States.

== History ==
The synagogue was founded in 1958, by former members of Congregation Zichron Ephraim (now called Park East Synagogue) who opposed that congregation's decision to seat men and women together during services. Henry Hirsch, Myrtle Hirsch, Leib Merkin, and Hermann Merkin were among the congregation's founders. Author Herman Wouk was an early member of the congregation.

The synagogue hosted the 2025 Jerusalem conference in New York, an event conducted to build connections between Israel and Diaspora Jews held in conjunction with the Israel Day on Fifth parade.

== Building ==
The Synagogue in 2026

The stone-clad building was designed by Percival Goodman, an architect who described himself as "an agnostic who was converted by Hitler." Goodman sought to interpret Jewish tradition in modern ways in the more than 50 synagogues he designed. Herman Wouk described Goodman's design as a "traditional Sephardic layout" with the bimah and aron in the center area facing rows of seats, thereby taking advantage of the depth of the property. In May 2010, a new mikvah at the Fifth Avenue Synagogue was dedicated. Funding for construction was provided by Ira Rennert and family.

== Clergy ==
Rabbi Immanuel Jakobovits was the founding Rabbi of the congregation in 1959, serving in that role until 1967 when he was elected to serve as Chief Rabbi of the United Hebrew Congregations of the Commonwealth. Jakobovitz was succeeded by Rabbi Emanuel Rackman, who served until 1977, when he was selected to serve as President of Bar-Ilan University. Rabbi Nisson Shulman served as the congregation's rabbi from 1977 until 1985. Rabbi Sol Roth assumed the leadership of the synagogue in 1986. Rabbi Yaakov Kermaier assumed leadership of the synagogue in 2003 and made aliyah with his family in 2015.

Rabbi Eli Babich, who was the associate rabbi since 2013, was named the head Rabbi in 2019. The Chazzan is Cantor Zak Benarroch and the cantor emeritus is the noted Cantor Joseph Malovany who retired in 2022.

== In popular culture ==
The synagogue appeared as a "cool 1950's apartment house" in a 2003 advertisement for the Infiniti Q45 luxury car in an ad created by the TBWA\Chiat\Day. The agency received permission to use the building in the background of the shot under the proviso that it not be identifiable, so the address on the awning was changed to the non-existent "63003 77th Street". The congregation was paid an undisclosed fee.

In the 1986 Woody Allen film, Hannah and her Sisters the building is panned across while being criticized for its architectural incongruity — "That's disgusting. That's really terrible." — after a shot of the consistent facades of the rest of the block.
