= Walter Bingham (journalist) =

British-Israeli journalist (born 1924)

Walter Bingham MM
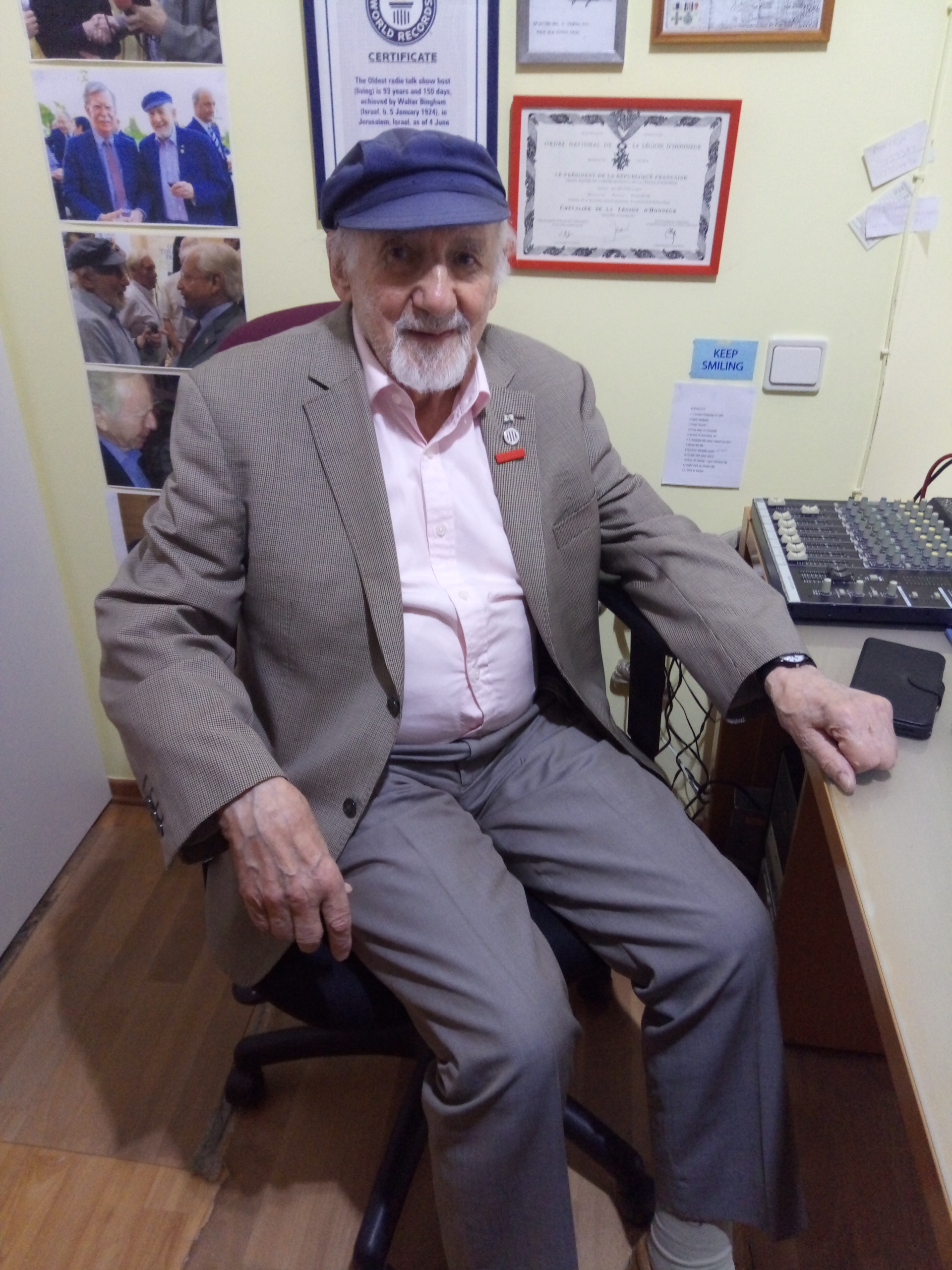
- Bingham in 2018
- Born: Wolfgang Billig; 5 January 1924 (age 102); Karlsruhe, Germany
- Occupations: Journalist, actor, businessman
- Children: 1

Walter Bingham MM (Hebrew: וולטר בינגהאם; born Wolfgang Billig; 5 January 1924) is a German-born British-Israeli journalist, actor, and businessman, as well as a Holocaust survivor and decorated World War II veteran. At age 99 in 2023, Bingham was Israel's oldest working journalist.

== Early life ==
Bingham was born in Karlsruhe, Germany on 5 January 1924, to an observant Jewish family. His parents had moved from Poland to Germany as children. He was active in an Orthodox Zionist youth group, preparing him for agricultural kibbutz life in Mandatory Palestine. Bingham witnessed the Nazi book burnings that followed soon after the Nazi seizure of power and personally experienced antisemitic bullying. As Bingham and his parents held Polish citizenship and were not German nationals, they were affected by the Polenaktion – the arrest and expulsion of Polish Jews living in Germany. Bingham's father was arrested but he himself was not caught up in the sweep as he had been away from the family home at the time – his parents had sent him to a Jewish school in Mannheim. Shortly afterwards, Bingham witnessed the events of Kristallnacht. He survived the Holocaust because of a Kindertransport to Great Britain in 1939, where he lived for the most part in a Zionist kibbutz-type community.

== Service in World War II ==
During World War II, the Free Polish Forces attempted to recruit him as he was a Polish national, but Bingham instead enlisted in the British Army and served as an ambulance driver in the Royal Army Service Corps. He took part on the front line in the Normandy landings of 1944. During one mission, his ambulance was knocked out by German fire, wounding his orderly and killing an officer. He then braved withering fire to rescue wounded soldiers. For his actions, he was awarded the Military Medal for 'Bravery in the Field' by King George VI. He would later be awarded France's highest honour, the Légion d'honneur, for his participation in the Normandy landings. Due to being a native German speaker, Bingham was transferred to Supreme Headquarters Allied Expeditionary Force to work as a documents specialist, analyzing captured German documents. While stationed in occupied Germany, he also worked in counter-intelligence and helped identify Nazi officers attempting to conceal their former roles. He interrogated former Nazi foreign minister Joachim von Ribbentrop, who denied all knowledge of the Holocaust.

I spoke to Ribbentrop (...) He was good looking and spoke excellent English. He had the cheek to say he knew nothing about the destruction of the Jews. He was the first to be hanged.

— Walter Bingham, Jerusalem Post, 2011.

His mother survived the Holocaust; she was one of the Jewish prisoners whose release was secured by Folke Bernadotte. She took refuge in Sweden and permanently settled there. After the war, while still serving in the British Army, Bingham was granted compassionate leave to visit his mother in Sweden.

Bingham was discharged from the British Army in 1947. He studied political philosophy at Birkbeck, University of London. He was invited to join the fight for Jewish independence in Mandatory Palestine, but decided against it. He later explained his decision to the Jerusalem Post: "I'd had enough war. Had I gone, and had I still been alive, who knows what I could have been. But I didn’t go. Today, being alive, and seeing where I live, I have some regrets." He met his wife, a refugee from Vienna, in the early 1950s. Although his friends from the Zionist community where he had lived moved to Israel and were among the founders of kibbutz Lavi, Bingham stayed in Britain as his wife did not want to leave. He worked in various jobs and at one point opened a diaper factory which went out of business in 1965. He has a daughter who later moved to Israel, as well as two grandchildren and two great-grandchildren. His wife died in 1990.

== Journalism career ==
Bingham went on to have a career as a journalist and broadcaster in Britain. He also modelled and acted in numerous movies and TV shows. Among his acting credits is a wizard in Harry Potter and the Philosopher's Stone and Harry Potter and the Chamber of Secrets, as well as numerous roles in various TV documentaries calling for older men with a white beard. He was also an advertising model and Santa Claus in London's premier department stores Harrods and Selfridges.

Bingham emigrated to Israel in 2004. At age 80, he attempted to get a job at Kol Israel but was turned down due to his age. He subsequently found work as a journalist with Israel National News.

Since 2004, he has hosted "Walter's World", a weekly radio magazine programme on Israel National News, and since 2016 "The Walter Bingham File" on Israel News Talk Radio. He is also a regular contributor to The Jerusalem Post and The Jerusalem Report.

In 2018 Bingham became Israel's oldest skydiver when he participated in a parachute jump in northern Israel.

In 2023 Bingham travelled to Germany, the Netherlands and the UK to participate in a reenactment and commemoration of the Kindertransport which was filmed for a documentary and covered extensively in the media.

Bingham turned 100 on 5 January 2024.
