= Zalman Baruch Melamed =

Israeli Orthodox rabbi

Rabbi Zalman Baruch Melamed הרב זלמן ברוך מלמד
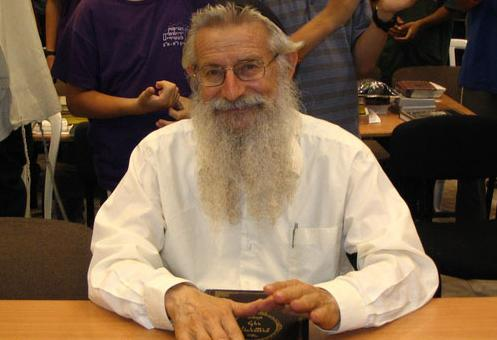
- Rabbi Zalman Baruch Melamed
- Title: Rosh Yeshiva of the Beit El yeshiva

Personal life
- Born: 1937 (age 88–89) Tel Aviv

Religious life
- Religion: Judaism
- Denomination: Religious Zionist

Zalman Baruch Melamed (Hebrew: זלמן ברוך מלמד; born 1937) is an Israeli Orthodox rabbi and the rosh yeshiva of the Beit El yeshiva in Beit El. He founded the Arutz Sheva radio station and served as neighborhood rabbi in Beit El until 2013.

== Background ==
Zalman Baruch Melamed was born in Tel Aviv in 1937. He studied at Kfar Haroeh yeshiva high school, and was among the founders of Yeshivat Kerem B'Yavneh. After a year, in 1954, he transferred to study at Mercaz Harav yeshiva. There, he became very close to the Rosh Yeshiva, Rabbi Zvi Yehuda Kook.

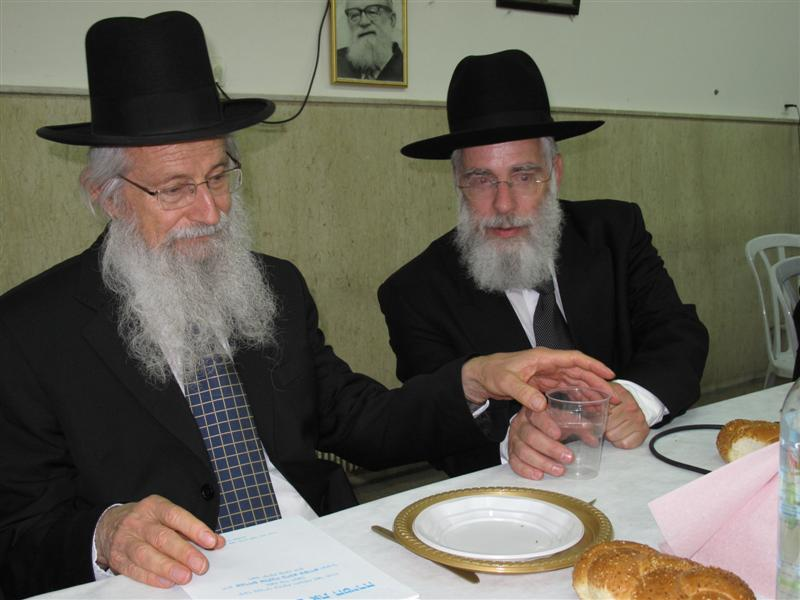
Rabbi Melamed (left) with Rabbi Yaakov Shapira at Mercaz HaRav yeshiva

He studied at Mercaz HaRav yeshiva for about a decade, teaching there as well. In 1978, he founded the Beit El yeshiva, which became well known for its prestige and rigor.

In 1988, Rabbi Melamed founded the Arutz Sheva radio station "to combat the 'negative thinking' and 'post-Zionist' attitudes so prevalent in Israel's liberal-left media". His wife Shulamit manages its day-to-day operations.

He and his wife Shulamit have seven children. One is Rabbi Eliezer Melamed, the rabbi and rosh yeshiva of Har Bracha. Another is Rabbi Yehuda Melamed, who teaches in Yeshivat Hesder Ramat Gan.

== Opinions ==
=== Visiting the Temple Mount ===
On Halakhic grounds, Rabbi Melamed opposes the idea of both Jews and gentiles visiting the Temple Mount.

=== Views on Israeli citizenship ===
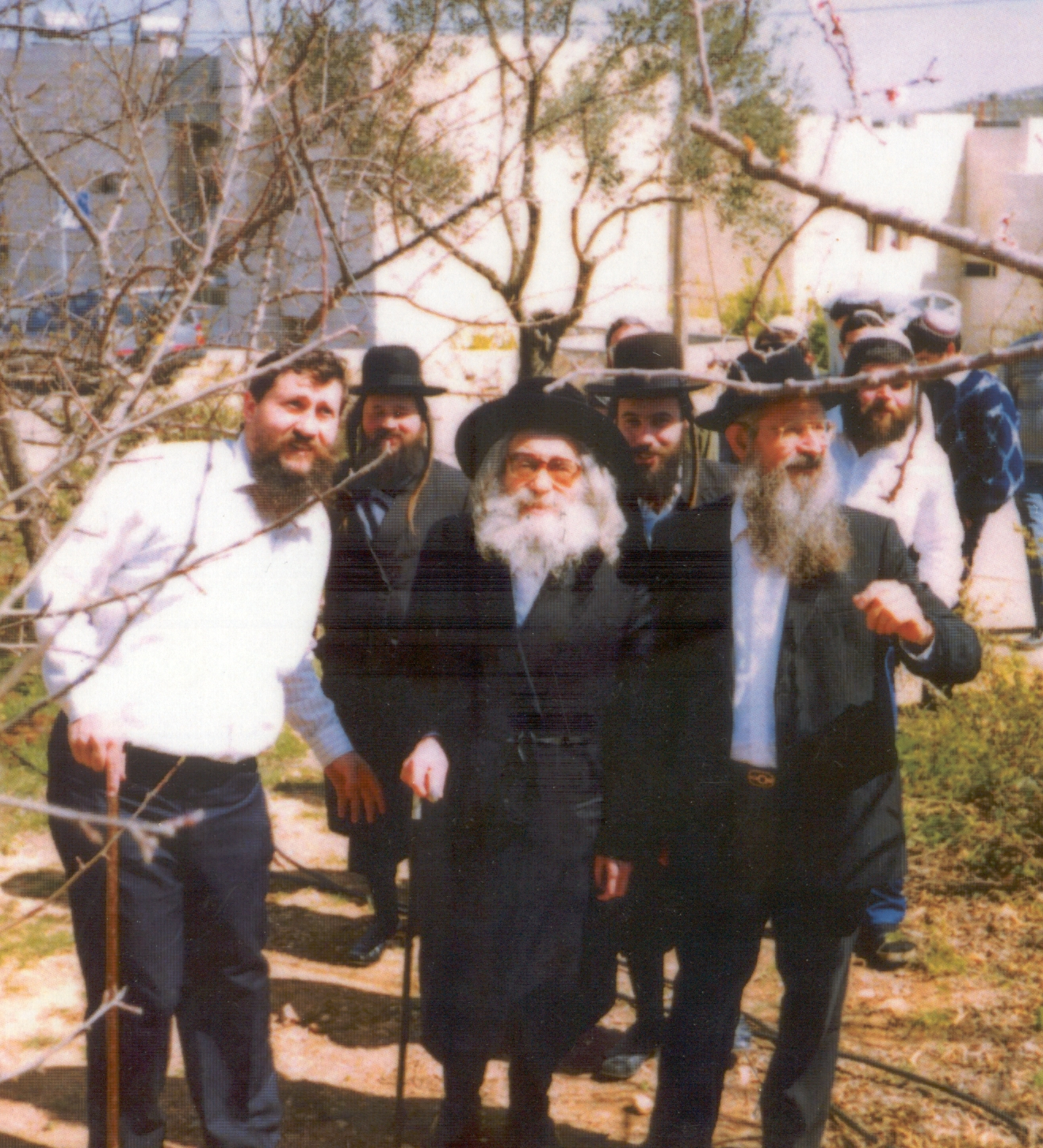
Rabbi Melamed (right) with Ya'akov Katz (left) in the center is Rabbi Pinchas Menachem Alter, 1990

Rabbi Melamed had at one point stated that, "There must be legislation allowing Jewish people everywhere in the world to become Israeli citizens, even if they do not live here." Melamed viewed this as a way to shore up Israel's Jewish demographic in elections. In the same talk, he advocated that "subversive" citizens of Israel should be stripped of their citizenship: "Even those with a democratic viewpoint understand that we must limit the rights of those who wish to harm the State, the law must dictate that the subversive cannot be citizens." Nonetheless, he is generally considered a soft-spoken right-wing moderate and has expressed various pro-America sentiments, and publicly supported President Donald Trump.
