= Joseph Malovany =

American singer

Joseph Malovany (Hebrew: יוסף מלובני; born in 1941 in Tel Aviv) is an Israeli-born American tenor soloist. A world-famous cantor, serving as Hazzan of New York's Fifth Avenue Synagogue since 1973, and a Distinguished Professor of Liturgical Music at Philip and Sarah Belz School of Jewish Music, Yeshiva University. Malovany possesses a strong spinto tenor voice, described by the London Guardian as “most powerful, beautiful and expressive spinto technique…sturdy and heroic” and by the Swedish newspaper Goteborgs Posten as “Judaism’s Jussi Bjorling”.

== Biography ==
Born in Tel Aviv, Malovany began his career as a cantor at Tel Aviv’s “Bilu” synagogue and in the Israeli army before stints at congregations in Johannesburg and London. While working at Fifth Avenue Synagogue since 1973 and Yeshiva University since 1985, Malovany has toured extensively, teaching and giving concerts. Since helping found the institution in 1989, Malovany has been Dean of the Joint Distribution Committee’s Moscow Academy of Jewish Music.

Malovany's concerts have been attended by Presidents and Prime Ministers. A Lithuanian coin was issued in his honor and in 2002, Malovany was appointed Honorary Chief Cantor of Vilnius. In 1997, the Joseph Malovany Chair for Advanced Studies in Jewish Liturgical Music was established, by New York’s Yeshiva University at its Belz School of Jewish Music. In January 2004, he became a commander of the Legion of Honor, Poland’s equivalent of knighthood, receiving this award from the then Polish president Aleksander Kwaśniewski for his musical contribution to the international and Polish communities. He is the first Jewish cantor to receive this title. He is also Rector of the Institute of Traditional Religious Jewish Liturgical Music in Leipzig, Germany.
