= Ya'akov Katz (politician born 1951) =

Israeli politician (born 1951)

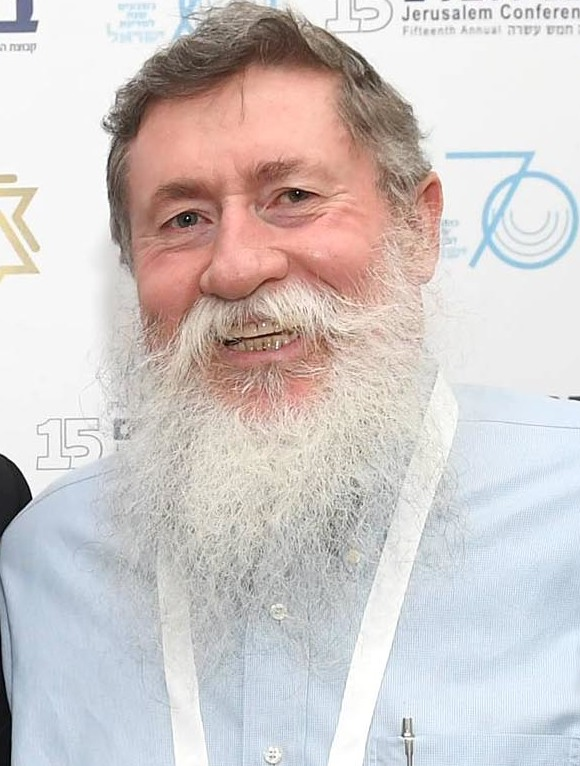
- Katz in 2018

Faction represented in the Knesset
- 2009–2013: National Union

Personal details
- Born: 29 September 1951 (age 75) Jerusalem

Ya'akov Dov "Ketzele" Katz (Hebrew: יעקב "כצל'ה" כץ, born 29 September 1951) is an Israeli politician. He led the National Union party from 2008 to 2012, for whom he was a member of the Knesset, and is also the executive director of Beit El yeshiva Center Institutions and Arutz Sheva. He is a settler leader.

== Biography ==
Ya'akov ("Ketzele") Katz was born in Jerusalem. He is a fifth-generation Israeli through his mother, while his father was an immigrant from Poland who made aliyah to the Land of Israel (then under British control) in the 1930s. Katz graduated from the Bnei Akiva Yeshiva High School "Kfar Haroeh", and went on to study in Yeshivat Mercaz HaRav in Jerusalem.

In 1970, he enlisted in the IDF and volunteered to serve in Sayeret Shaked. He served under then OC Southern Command General Ariel Sharon in the 1971 campaign in Gaza. In 1972, he completed his officers' course with distinction, and commanded his own commando unit in Sayeret Shaked.

In the Yom Kippur War in 1973, Katz served in a group of twelve reservists under the command of Amatzia Chen who carried out operations within the division of Ariel Sharon. On the eighth day of the war, the force set out to locate Egyptian forces that had landed in helicopters in the deployment area to cross the Suez Canal. Katz suffered a serious injury to his left thigh as a result of the impact of an RPG rocket on his APC, and was severely wounded.

It was during that period that he met his future wife Tami, a sociology student at Bar-Ilan University, who had volunteered to work in Beilinson Hospital helping nurse the worst wounded.

Akiva Margaliot released a CD called "Aseh" containing songs with musical arrangements composed by Katz.

Katz is married with seven children.

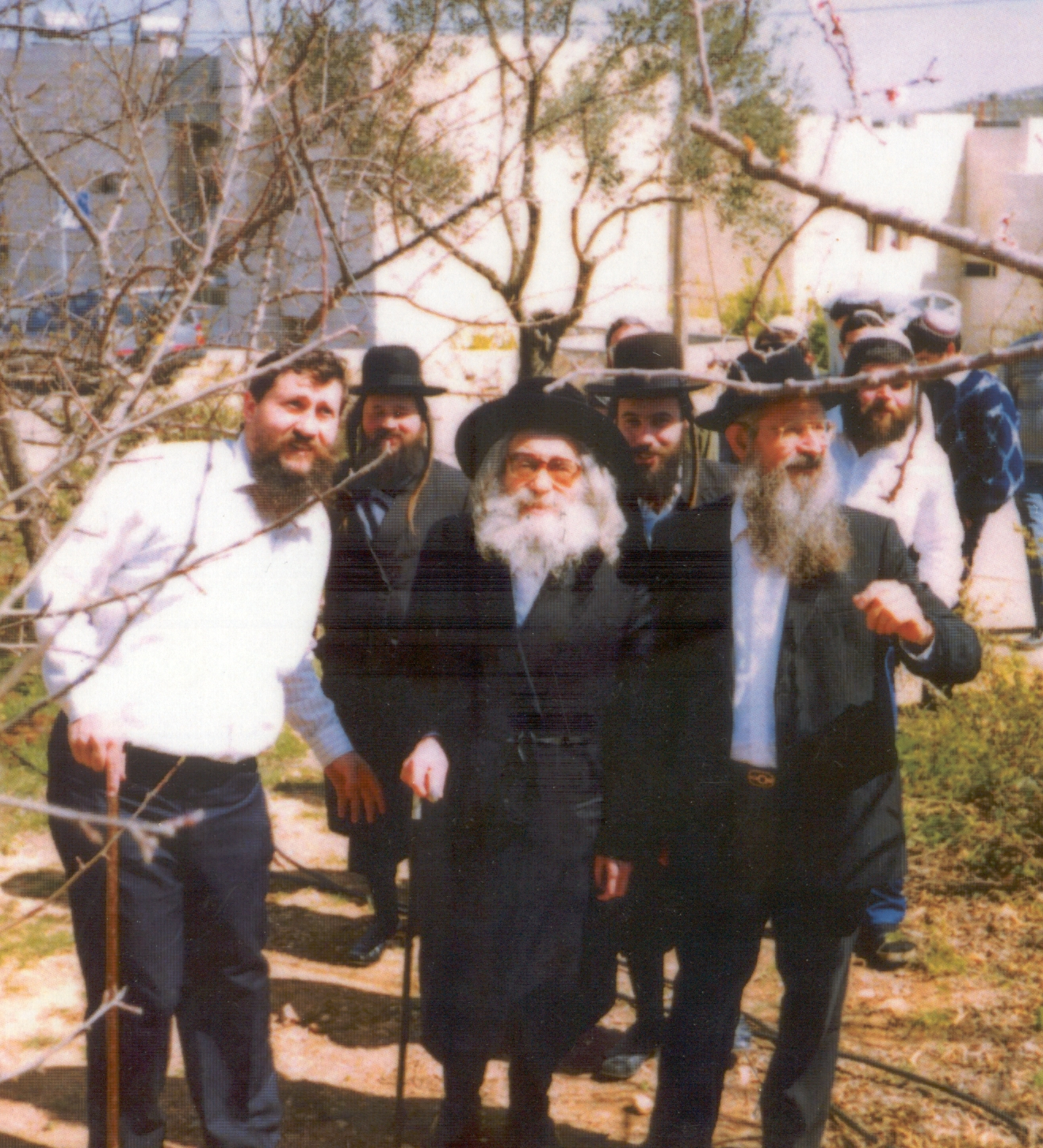
Ya'akov "Ketzele" Katz (at left) with rabbi Zalman Baruch Melamed in 1990

== Settler leader ==
After six months in hospital, he returned on crutches to study four more years in Yeshivat Mercaz HaRav under Rabbi Tzvi Yehuda Kook and Mazkir Bnei Akiva Shlomo Aviner. In 1977, he joined the group that established the Beit El settlement in the West Bank. In 1978, Katz, together with his Rabbi Zalman Baruch Melamed, split with the Beit El group and founded a new settlement which was called Beit El B. Katz was one of the original members of the Gush Emunim movement. He and his family were among the first ten families to move to Beit El.Katz served as an assistant to Ariel Sharon when Sharon was Housing and Development Minister. Katz was involved in the absorption of olim from the former Soviet Union, and was responsible for building more than 35,000 housing units in East Jerusalem, the West Bank, and the Golan Heights. These houses doubled the Jewish population beyond the Green Line.

Yaakov Katz founded "West Bank Jewish Population Stats," "a report sponsored by "Bet El Institutions," a prominent settler organization that has ties to Trump's closest Mideast advisers", according to Haaretz.

== Pedagogic and media career ==
Katz founded the Beit-El Yeshiva Center, an educational center comprising myriad institutions with over 1,200 students: the Beit El Yeshiva and Kollel, Teachers' College, Har Brakha Hesder Yeshiva, Bnei Tzvi Yeshiva High School, Ra'aya Academy for Young Women (high school), Beit El Pre-Military Academy, as well as Arutz Sheva.

In 1987 Katz bought an oceangoing vessel upon which to set up a radio station, Arutz Sheva (Channel 7), as an alternative station with a national religious orientation. The station never received a license to broadcast. After the station was shut down in 2002, he founded the weekly Israeli newspaper BeSheva.

In 2003 he was convicted of operating an illegal radio station, and on two counts of perjury for having lied about the location of the broadcasts. In 2006 president Moshe Katsav pardoned him.

== Political career ==
In December 2008, Katz became chairman of the National Union alliance. In the 2009 elections, the party won four seats, and Katz entered the Knesset.

In a March 2010 proposal to curb illegal immigration and the increase of illegal work aliens, Katz has suggested that a "special town" be created in southern Israel that would be "less convenient and glamorous" then the currently attractive city of Tel Aviv.

He was the first MK to propose a Yom HaAliyah. It would later be passed as law and established as the fifth Israeli Secular Israeli holiday.

Katz lost his seat in the 2013 Israeli legislative election.

Party political offices
Preceded by Zvi Hendel	Leader of Tkuma; 2009–2012	Succeeded by Uri Ariel
