= Beit El =

Israeli settlement in the West Bank

Beit El / Beth El: בֵּית אֵל; بيت إيل
- Local council

Hebrew transcription(s)
  - ISO 259: Beit ʔel
  - Also spelled: Bet El (official)
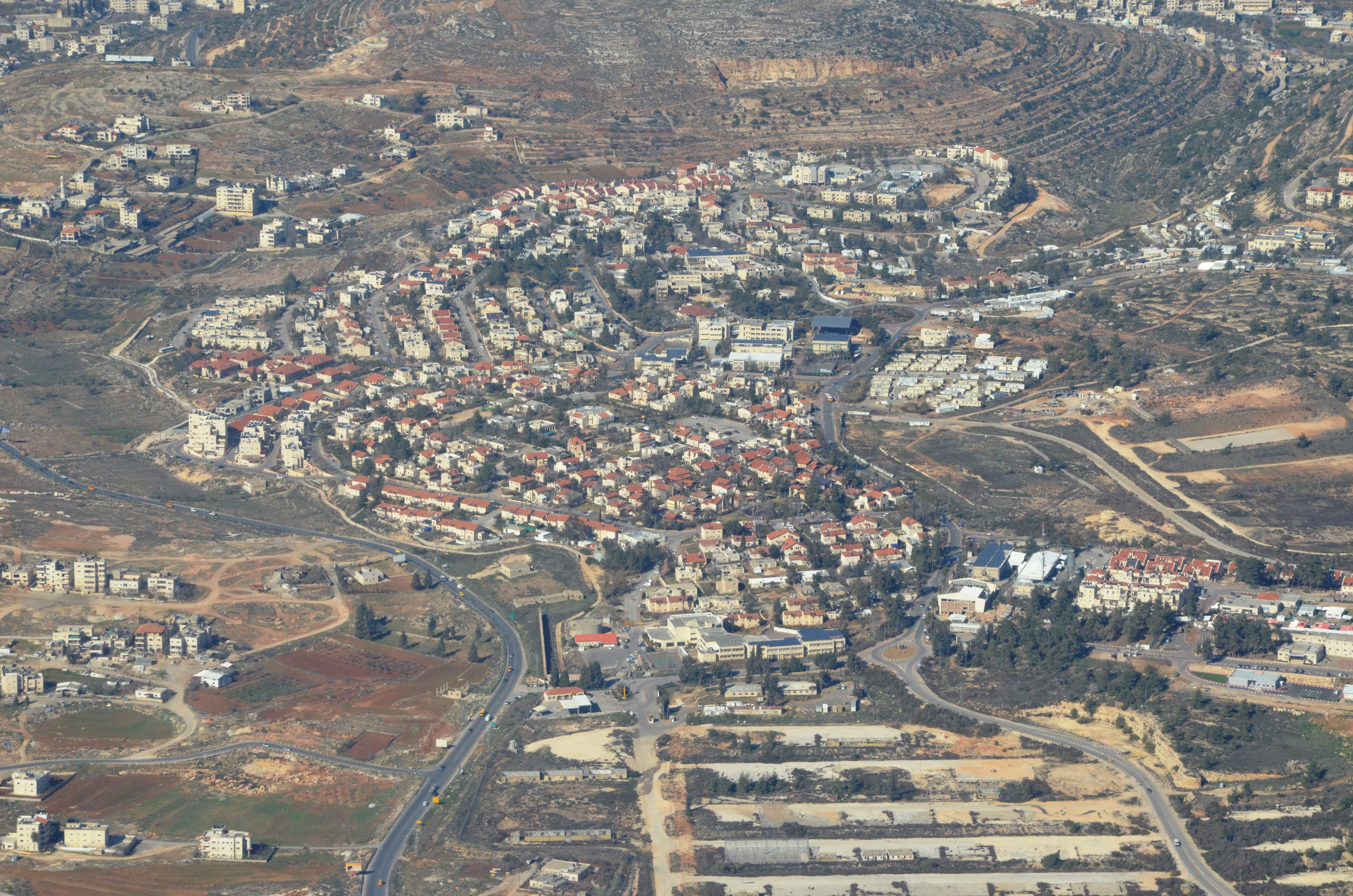

- Location within the Central West Bank
- Coordinates: 31°56′37.5531″N 35°13′21.1765″E
- Country: Palestinian territories (occupied West Bank)
- District: Judea and Samaria Area
- Founded: 1977

Government
  - Head of Municipality: Shay Alon

Area
  - Total: 1,528 dunams (1.528 km^{2}; 0.590 sq mi)

Population (2024)
  - Total: 6,359
  - Density: 4,162/km^{2} (10,780/sq mi)
- Website: www.bet-el.muni.il

Beit El or Beth El (Hebrew: בֵּית אֵל) is an Israeli settlement and local council located in the Binyamin Region of the West Bank. The Orthodox Jewish town was settled in 1977–78 by the ultranationalist group Gush Emunim. It is located in the hills north of Jerusalem, east of the Palestinian city of al-Bireh, adjacent to Ramallah. In September 1997, Beit El was awarded local council status. The head of the local council is Shai Alon. In 2024 its population was 6,359.

The international community considers Israeli settlements in the West Bank illegal under international law, but the Israeli government disputes this. The Ulpana neighbourhood was evacuated when it emerged that it was built on private Palestinian land. The World Zionist Organization (WZO) halted land transactions in the Aleph neighbourhood of Beit El after it emerged that some 250 buildings there were constructed illegally, and fraud was suspected.

== Geography ==
Beit El, with a higher elevation than Jerusalem, has cool nights in summer and occasional snow in winter. The Pisgat Ya'akov neighborhood (also named Jabel Artis) has a hilltop observatory with a commanding view of the surrounding hills. Tel Aviv area and Mount Hermon can be seen on clear days.

Northeast of Beit El is the Ma'ayanot Qara Nature Reserve, so named on account of its proximity to the nearby village of Dura al-Qara'. The nature reserve is the site of five natural springs whose source is a channel carved between overlying cliffs. The limestone formations at the springs are dated to the Cenomanian age. The nature reserve is a habitat for Hedera helix ivy, not known anywhere else between the region of Edom to the south and the Galilee to the north, as well as Teucrium montbretii, which grows only in the vicinity of Ramallah.

== History ==
=== Army activity, land expropriation (1967-77) ===
After the Six-Day War in 1967, the area came under Israeli occupation. According to ARIJ, Israel confiscated land from three nearby Palestinian towns/villages in order to construct Beit El: 680 dunams from Dura al-Qar'; 346 dunams from Al-Bireh; 137 dunams from Ein Yabrud.

In 1970, private Palestinian land of al-Bireh and Dura al-Qar was seized by military order for a military outpost and later on consigned to settlers for the purpose of civilian settlement.

=== Settlement beginnings (1977–79) ===
In 1977, Beit El was established on this land. Seventeen families settled near the IDF (Israel Defense Forces) base. The settlement consisted of Beit El Aleph (Beit El A), a residential religious community in the southern half of Beit El, whose inhabitants worked in the free professions outside the yishuv, and Beit El Bet (Beit El B), situated on the northern hill around the yeshiva founded by Ya'akov Katz and Zalman Baruch Melamed, partly on private land and partly on land purchased by the Himnuta land development company (a subsidiary of JNF-KKL). Public buildings and civilian homes and caravans were built on the land.

The settlement has been founded by the ultranationalist group Gush Emunim.

While the government declared that requisition of the land was temporary, in the Beit El case of 1978 the Israeli High Court approved the settlement for reasons of "general security". The state declared that the right of the settlers to remain in Beit El would expire upon the termination of its military necessity.

On 10 April 1979, the Joint Settlement Committee of the Israeli Government and the World Zionist Organization endorsed the split into Beit El A and Beit El B.

=== Development ===
In 1997, when Beit El was awarded local council status, Beit El A and Beit El B again became a single settlement.

=== Court cases over land ownership ===
In July 2015, the IDF demolished two buildings built illegally on Palestinian land, as found by the Israeli High Court. The demolition has been mentioned as a possible cause for the Duma arson killings, considered to be a "price tag" response to it.

== Neighborhoods ==
Beit El is located on a non-contiguous area, but according to a Yesh Din petition, the neighborhoods are connected by illegal construction. Only Maoz Zur was built on land classified by Israel as state land. Maoz Tzur was established on the land of the IDF base in 1998. A secret database published by Haaretz in 2009 revealed that Beit El was largely built on private Palestinian lands, without approval. According to Peace Now, private Palestinian property makes up 96.85% of the land that Beit El, along with its outposts. April 2012, the State continued delaying the demolition. On 7 May 2012, the Supreme Court rejected the State's application to re-open the proceeding and decided that the five buildings, each with 6 apartments, should be demolished before 1 July. End of June, 33 families left the apartments, but despite earlier rulings and promises, in November 2012 the High Court again granted the State a delay regarding demolishing of the buildings.

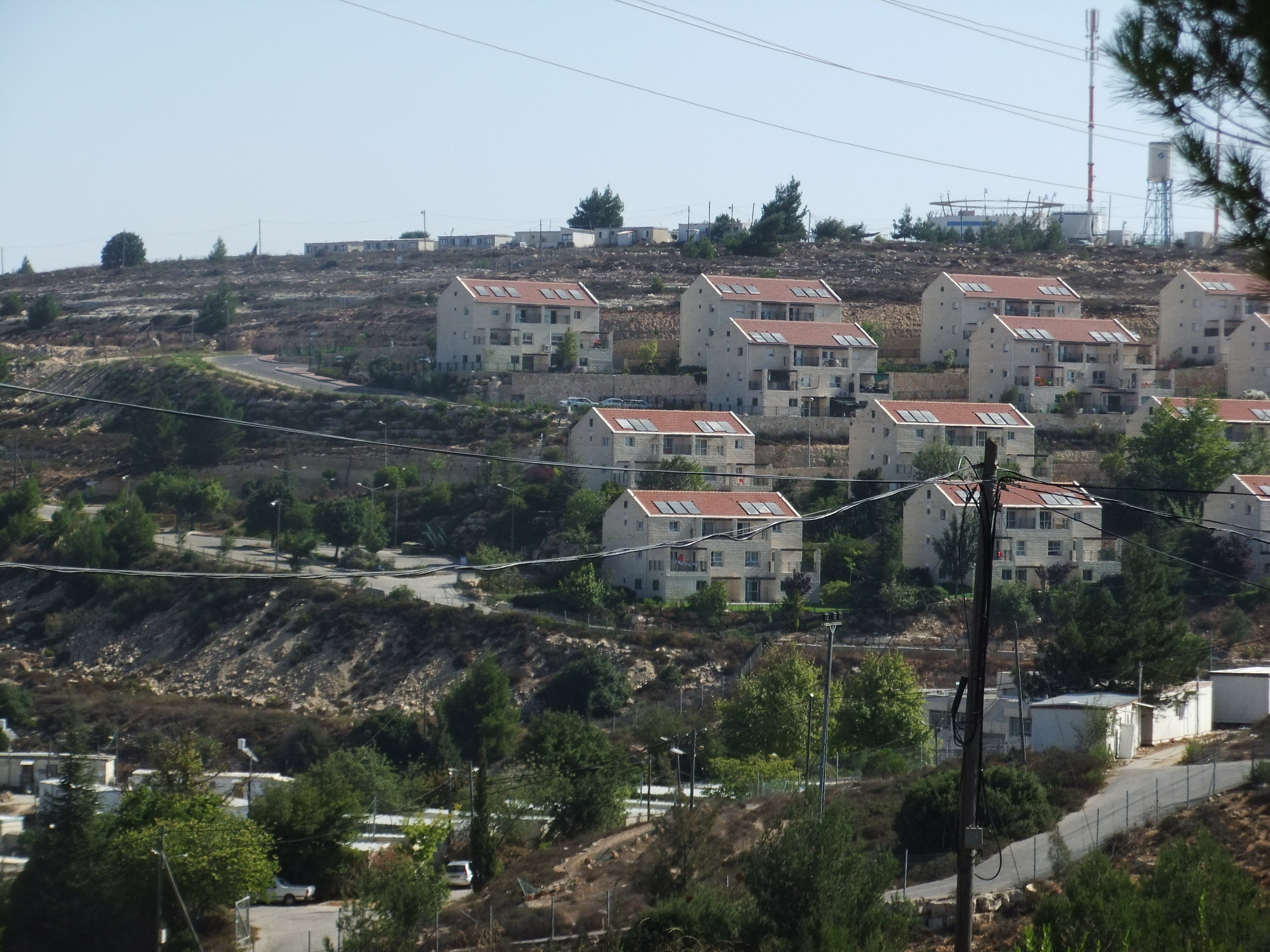
Ulpana neighborhood, with Jabel Artis in the background

On 3 January 1997, residents of Beit El, led by Ya'akov Katz, occupied the site at night. The Israeli outpost was named Maoz Tzur, after Ita and Ephraim Tzur who had been murdered 3 weeks earlier. Later, this name was used for the neighborhood Maoz Tzur, built at the southern edge of Beit El, and sometimes erroneously used for Ulpana. Two days later, the site was voluntarily evacuated in anticipation of further enlargement of Beit El.

In 2001, Pisgat Ya'akov (Jabel Artis) was established northeast of Ulpana. In 2003, the land was seized by military order, allegedly for use as a helipad, although residents said they never saw helicopters at the site. In February 2001, caravans were placed there and infrastructure was financed by the Ministry of Housing and Construction. In August 2003, there were 20 caravans. Tel Haim and Jabel Artis were merged, becoming Beit El Mizrach. Jabel Artis was partially built on land of the Palestinian Hussein Farahat. Apparently, the land was registered with forged documents, suggesting it was bought from the already 32 year dead Farahat.

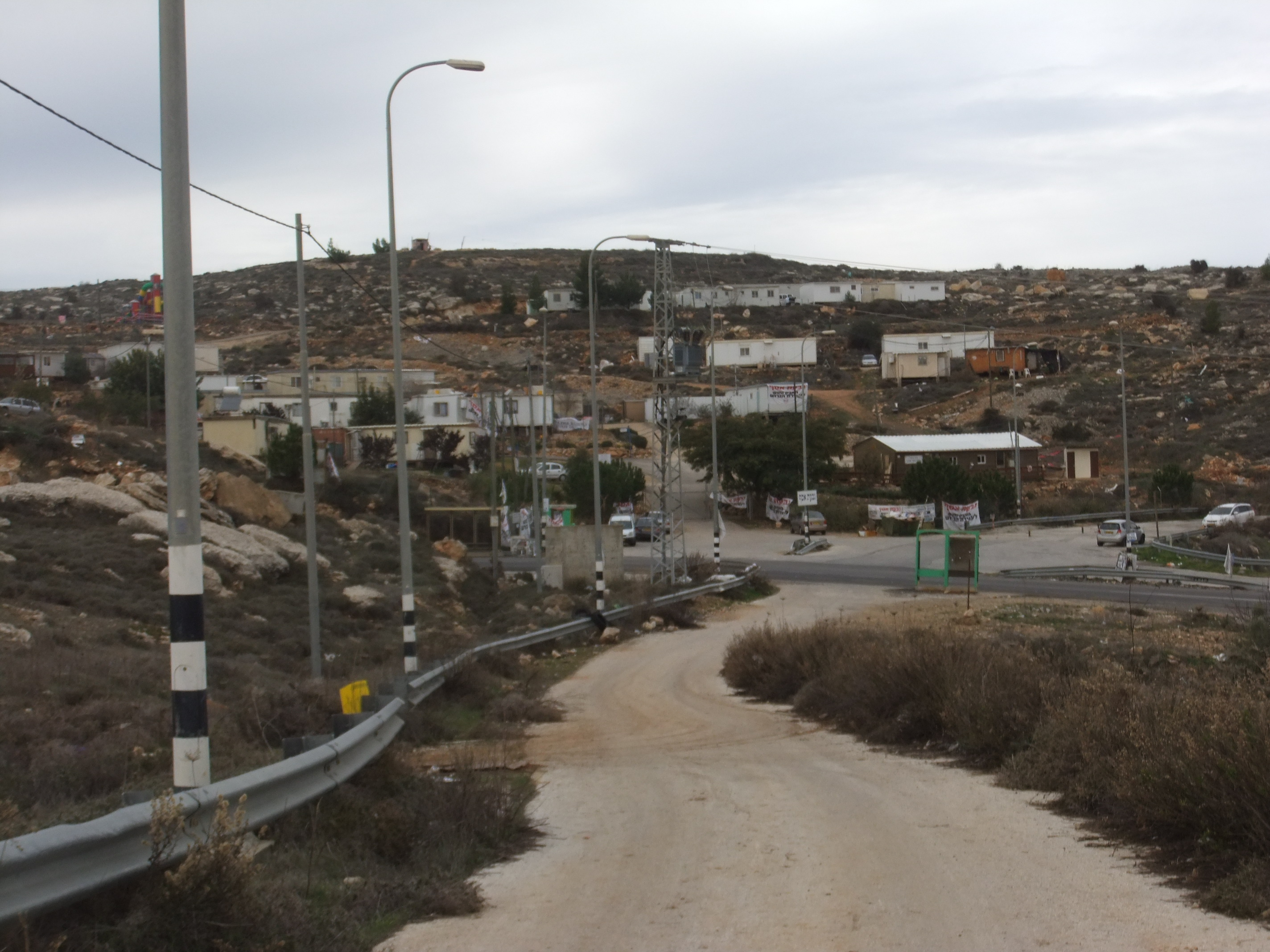
The outpost Givat Assaf

Beit El East (Tel Haim) consists of a caravan neighborhood adjacent to the Beit El Camps shooting ranges (IDF). It is built on private Palestinian land with state financing. Also in 2001, some 3 km (2 mi) south of Beit El, the outpost Giv'at Asaf (Givat Assaf) was set up. Next to Givat Assaf the outpost Oz Zion was established, which was removed by the IDF forces in December 2012.

The World Zionist Organization's Settlement Division is responsible for the exploitation of "state lands" in Israel as well as in the Occupied Territories. When it became clear that some 250 homes in Beit El were fraudulently registered, the WZO decided to suspend the transfer of property rights.

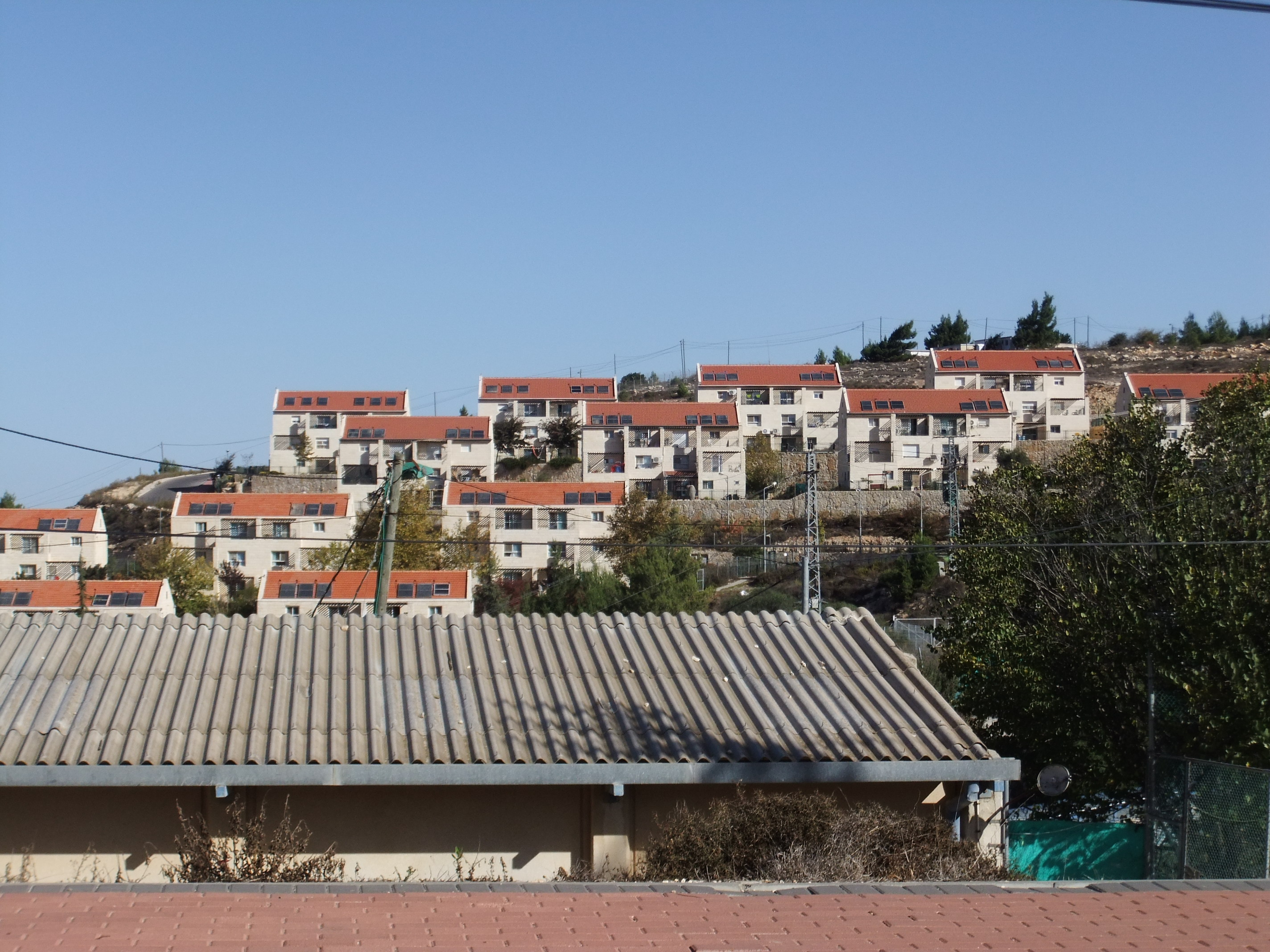
Ulpana neighborhood

In 1999, the Ulpana neighborhood (Giv'at Ha'ulpana) was established northeast of Beit El. It is named for the two religious high schools for girls (ulpana) located there.

In 2003, apartment buildings were constructed by the Company for the Development of Beit El's Yeshiva Complex (CEO Yoel Tzur) and Amana. All structures in Ulpana, including public buildings, permanent homes, caravans and an industrial area, were built on private Palestinian land and without an approved plan. According to the Sasson Report, it is not an outpost but an unauthorized neighborhood. It was built on the outskirts of Beit El with funding from the Ministry of Housing and Construction, and the homeowners received state grants and bank mortgages. A stop-work order was issued by an Israeli court in September 1999, followed by a number of stop-work and demolition orders, but construction continued.

On 29 October 2008, villagers of Dura al-Qar, assisted by Yesh Din, submitted a petition against the construction of caravans and 5 of the 14 apartment buildings in Ulpana, claiming they were built on private and registered Palestinian land outside of the area of the original Beit El settlement and without any plan. The buildings, the construction of which began in 2003, were an extension of the Ulpana neighborhood and planned as part of a new outpost, Jabel Artis. In a lawsuit submitted in September 2011, Amana and the Beit El Yeshiva Center claimed ownership to the lands. On 27 November 2012, the lawsuit was dismissed on request of the settlers. The land was purchased with forged documents. The State found that the seller of the land was a 7 year old Palestinian child, and that Amana knew that the "seller" was not the legal owner of the land. The purchase was not approved or registered in the land registry. The police started an investigation of suspected fraud involving Amana's lawyer MK David Rotem, Amana and Ulpana founder Yoel Tzur. The police found that land was not correctly registered, but closed the case in 2010, because "no one had committed any crime". Some house owners said they were not aware of the deceit, as the developer told them the land was owned by the WZO and supplied false accounts. It turned out that the developing company used the WZO ownership document relating to the Maoz Tzur neighborhood in southern Beit El, to claim ownership of the Ulpana Hill land.

Although only some 30 families were evicted, the Defense Ministry approved in February 2013 the building of 90 new homes, to house the Ulpana inhabitants on the land originally seized for "temporarily" military use. This contrary to the "1979 Elon Moreh ruling". The 90 housing units were part of a 300 homes plan, earlier approved by the government in return for non-violent evacuation from Ulpana. In May 2013, just as new US shuttle diplomacy to revive the peace process began, the Civil Administration approved 296 homes to build, allegedly also to be compensation for Israelis who were evicted from Ulpana. According to Peace Now, the 296 units plan came in addition to the 90 homes approved in February, the 200 units approved in December 2012 and 30 temporary homes.

In January 2013, the yeshiva requested the Court to limit the compensation for the Palestinian land owners to a maximum amount. They also asked to prohibit the Palestinians to turn to any organization, including government authorities, to request further reparations, as it could hamper the continued development of Beit El.

== Demographics ==
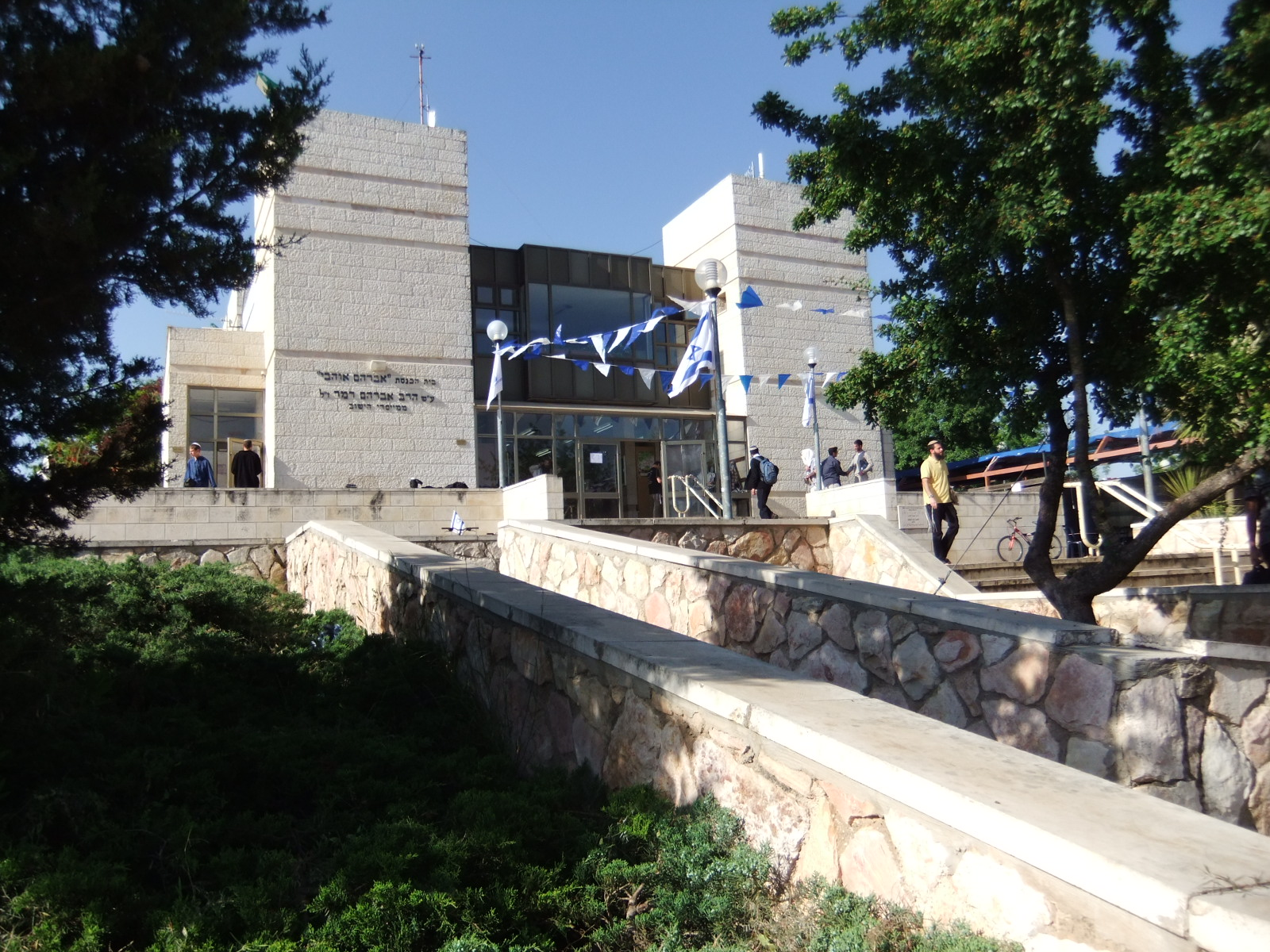
Beit El synagogue

Beit El has a large percentage of immigrants from other countries, like India, Peru, Ethiopia and Russia and is also home to a unique community of Bnei Menashe from Manipur and Mizoram. Many immigrants live in caravans. Most inhabitants are affiliated with the Religious Zionist Movement. The rabbis of the town are Rabbi Shlomo Aviner and Rabbi Zalman Baruch Melamed who is also the rosh yeshiva of the local Beit El Yeshiva.

== Economy ==
Beit El yeshiva is the owner of Arutz Sheva which operates out of studios in Beit El and Petah Tikva. Economic enterprises in Beit El include a tefillin factory, a winery, metalworks, carpentry shops and a bakery.

== Education and culture ==
In August 2022, Israeli singer Aviv Geffen held a concert in Beit El. Jacob's Rock, a site associated with the biblical account of Jacob's dream, features a tan slab of rock, an ancient oak tree, a burial cave and a crumbling stone building, formerly an Islamic prayer house and Christian chapel.

== Voting Patterns ==
In the 2022 election, 96 percent of voters in Beit El voted for the parties of the right-wing coalition led by Benjamin Netanyahu, while 1 percent voted for the parties of the center-left coalition led by Yair Lapid. 83 percent of voters voted for the Religious Zionist Party-Otzma Yehudit list. The Arab parties did not receive any votes.

In the 2026 election, 94 percent of voters in Beit El voted for the parties of the right-wing coalition led by Benjamin Netanyahu, while 2 percent voted for the parties of the center-left coalition led by Gadi Eisenkot and 0.1 percent voted for the Arab parties. An additional 0.5 percent voted for the Reservists, and 1.5 percent voted for Amcha Yisrael. 71 percent of voters voted for the Religious Zionist Party. Voter turnout increased 19 percent from the 2022 election.

== Notable residents ==
- Emuna Elon (born 1955), Israeli author, journalist, and women's rights activist
- Binyamin Elon (1954–2017), Israeli Orthodox rabbi and politician
- Ya'akov Katz (born 1951), politician
- Dov Kalmanovich (born 1956), Israeli activist and first Israeli terror victim of the First Intifada
- Shlomo Aviner (born 1943), Israeli Orthodox rabbi and spiritual leader of the Religious Zionist movement
- Yehuda HaKohen - Leader in the VISION Movement

== Legal status ==
Israeli settlements are regarded as illegal under international law according to Fourth Geneva Convention (article 49), which prohibits an occupying power transferring citizens from its own territory to occupied territory. Israel disputes that the Fourth Geneva Convention applies to the Palestinian territories as they had not been legally held by a sovereign prior to Israel taking control of them. This view has been rejected by the International Court of Justice and the International Committee of the Red Cross. In November 2019, the Trump Administration reversed long-standing U.S. policy and determined that settlements such as Beit El do not violate international law.
