= B'Sheva =

Israeli weekly newspaper

B'Sheva בשבע

- Type: Weekly newspaper
- Format: Tabloid
- Owner: Arutz Sheva
- Founder: Dudu saada
- Editor: Emanuel Shilo
- Founded: 2002
- Political alignment: Right-wing, Religious Zionist
- Language: Hebrew
- Headquarters: Petah Tikva, Israel
- Country: Israel
- Circulation: 130,000
- Website: be7.co.il

B'Sheva (Hebrew: בְּשֶׁבַע, lit. 'at seven') is a weekly Hebrew language newspaper published in Israel.

The first issue of B'sheva, published by Arutz Sheva, appeared on July 19, 2002. It is distributed free on Thursdays in religious population centers.

== Readership ==
The paper is read by 130,000 families and has been rated the largest circulation newspaper in Israel's religious sector. According to a 2005 TGI survey, B'Sheva was read by 6.1% of Israeli adults. In a TGI survey comparing the last half of 2009 with the same period in 2008, B'Sheva was fourth in market share for weekly newspapers.

According to a 2022 TGI survey, in the weekend press Israel Hayom continues to claim first place with 27.6% in the second half of 2022, and in the annual summary with 28.3% - a decrease from 2021 when it recorded 31.9%. After him: Yedioth Ahronoth by a small margin with 27.4%. In the annual summary, the newspaper recorded 26.8% - a decrease from 2021 when it presented data of 23.9%. Besheva newspaper jumps to 7.1% and remains stable in third place. In the summary of 2022, the sectoral newspaper recorded 6.6%. Maariv weekend with 5.7% and an annual summary of 5.8%. The Haaretz newspaper is in fifth place in the weekend edition with 5.6% and an annual summary of 6%.

== See also ==
- Israeli newspapers
