= Yeshiva.co =

Jewish website

Yeshiva.co is an English website affiliated with Beit El Yeshiva.

== History ==
The site offers Torah lessons for reading, viewing and listening. It was founded by Ezra Cohen and partners in Adar 5760 (2000), with the encouragement and support of the Rosh Yeshiva, Rabbi Zalman Baruch Melamed.

Yeshiva.co is the second established Yeshiva site after the site of Yeshivat Har Etzion and is the first Jewish site available on cell phones. The purpose of the site is to serve the public, and open a gate to the world of the Torah for every Jew in Israel and abroad. Today it has 16 employees maintaining the site.

The site used to be an English division of Yeshiva.org.il but since the beginning of 2013 has its own domain.
The site also occasionally organizes conferences on various subjects, such as conferences for Rabbis answering questions on "Ask the rabbi" or conferences open to the public.

== Structure ==
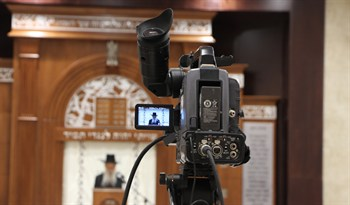
Lesson being taped for website

- Torah classes given by rabbis, mostly identified with the Religious Zionism.
- Internet TV channel which broadcasts Torah lessons throughout the day.
- A library with a large number of books that can be read online or downloaded.
- A database of thousands of questions, answered by different Religious Zionist Rabbis.
- Calendar and system for calculating all times that have a religious significance.
- An embedding system, which allows other websites to add a Jewish calendar, daily Q & A or daily lesson to their site
