= Chaim Richman =

Israeli rabbi

Chaim Richman is a rabbi in Israel, and was the International Director of the Temple Institute from 1989 to 2020, which is dedicated to the rebuilding of the Holy Temple in Jerusalem, and a member of the current effort to revive the Sanhedrin. In January 2020 he left the Temple Institute and founded the organization Jerusalem Lights.

He is known for his involvement in the effort to produce a red heifer, which is a requirement for the rebuilding of the temple.

Rabbi Richman used to have a web television show, "Light to the Nations", on UniversalTorah.com, which explores the Jewish roots founded in the Torah and teaches people of the Jewish people's strong foundations in the Hebrew Bible.

Richman has written two books "A House of Prayer for All Nations: The Holy Temple of Jerusalem" and "The Holy Temple of Jerusalem".

== Media coverage ==
- , Israel National News, January 31, 2020
- "Judaism For Gentiles' Spreads From The Church Without A Steeple", Jerusalem Post, Fred Mogul, April 28, 1992
