= Rimonim (disambiguation) =

Rimonim (Hebrew: רִמּוֹנִים, רימונים), is an Israeli settlement in the West Bank.

Rimonim or Rimmonim may also refer to:

- Torah rimonim (or simply "rimonim"), finials adorning the top ends of the rollers of a Torah scroll
- Rimonim, a magazine of the Center for Jewish Art, Israel
- Rimonim hotels, a chain owned by Israel Land Development Company
- Rimonim Prison in Tel Mond, Israel; part of the Israel Prison Service

== See also ==
- Rimon (disambiguation)
- Rimmon
