= Oz Zion =

Israeli outpost in the West Bank

Oz Zion is an Israeli outpost in the West Bank. It falls under the purview of the Mateh Binyamin Regional Council. The international community considers Israeli settlements in the West Bank illegal under international law, but the Israeli government disputes this.

== History ==
Oz Zion was founded sometime after 2005 and is therefore not listed in the Sasson Report. It has been repeatedly evacuated and demolished by the Israel Defense Forces (IDF) and the Israel Border Police (IBP) since its founding.

In November 2011, Israeli police and IDF soldiers arrested twelve settlers out of dozens who were throwing stones at them in an attempt to prevent the removal of three illegal structures in Oz Zion. In both January and February 2012 forces from the Israeli Civil Administration destroyed structures in Oz Zion. In May 2012 security forces demolished two structures in Oz Zion, one of which was inhabited.

On December 29, 2012, a group of hundreds of settlers drove off IDF and IBP forces who were attempting to dismantle structures at Oz Zion. Five members of the Border Police were wounded in this attack. The IDF and IBP returned the next day, evicted 20 residents of the illegal outpost, and destroyed a number of structures. The outpost was subsequently rebuilt and destroyed by security forces again in March 2013 and in April 2013.

== Demographics ==
As of December 2012, according to settler activist Daniella Weiss, there was one family living at Oz Zion and "a steady group of teens and young adults who man the outpost."

== Geography ==
Oz Zion is located close to Highway 60, near Giv'at Asaf and Beit El.
