= Kamel Muhyieddeen =

Minister of Social Affairs and Labor
- In office 13 February 1965 – 31 July 1965

Minister of Construction and Building
- In office 6 July 1964 – 13 February 1965

Minister of Agriculture
- In office 9 July 1963 – 6 July 1965

Personal details
- Born: Deir Debwan 1928 (Palestine)
- Died: 14 July 1984 Deir Debwan, Palestine
- Education: Woodbury University, (United States)

Kamel Muhyieddeen (Arabic: كامل محي الدين, romanized: Kāmil Muḥyī al-Dīn; 1928–14 July 1984) was a political figure of Palestinian descent. He was the Minister of State and Minister of Agriculture for the country Jordan.

== Career ==
He worked in the Agricultural Cooperative Society and then as a consultant. He became a deputy in the Parliament of Jordan, representing the Governorate of Amman. He was a member of the Jordan First Committee and a member of the Jordanian Parties Committee. He served as a senator in the parliament of Jordan from 1963 through 1966. In 1969 he was the governor of the capital of Jordan, Amman. Muhyieddeen served as a Governor in Abu Dhabi in the 1970s. Speaking for the Jordanian government, Muheddeen rejected calls for a binational state and unilateral declaration of statehood. At a news conference, Muheddeen stated, "We accept a Palestinian state on the borders of 1967, with Jerusalem as its capital, the release of Palestinian prisoners, and the resolution of the issue of refugees." He served as a senator in the parliament of Jordan from 1963 through 1966.

== Palestinian statehood ==
Speaking for the Jordanian government, Muhyieddeen rejected calls for a bi-national state and unilateral declaration of statehood.

At a news conference, Muhyieddeen stated, "We accept a Palestinian state on the borders of 1967, with Jerusalem as its capital, the release of Palestinian prisoners, and the resolution of the issue of refugees."

== Death ==
Muhyieddeen had a host of health issues and died at the age of 56 from kidney failure on July 14, 1984, in his birthplace of Deir Debwan, Ramallah, Palestine.

== See also ==
- Cabinet of Jordan
