= Torah finials =

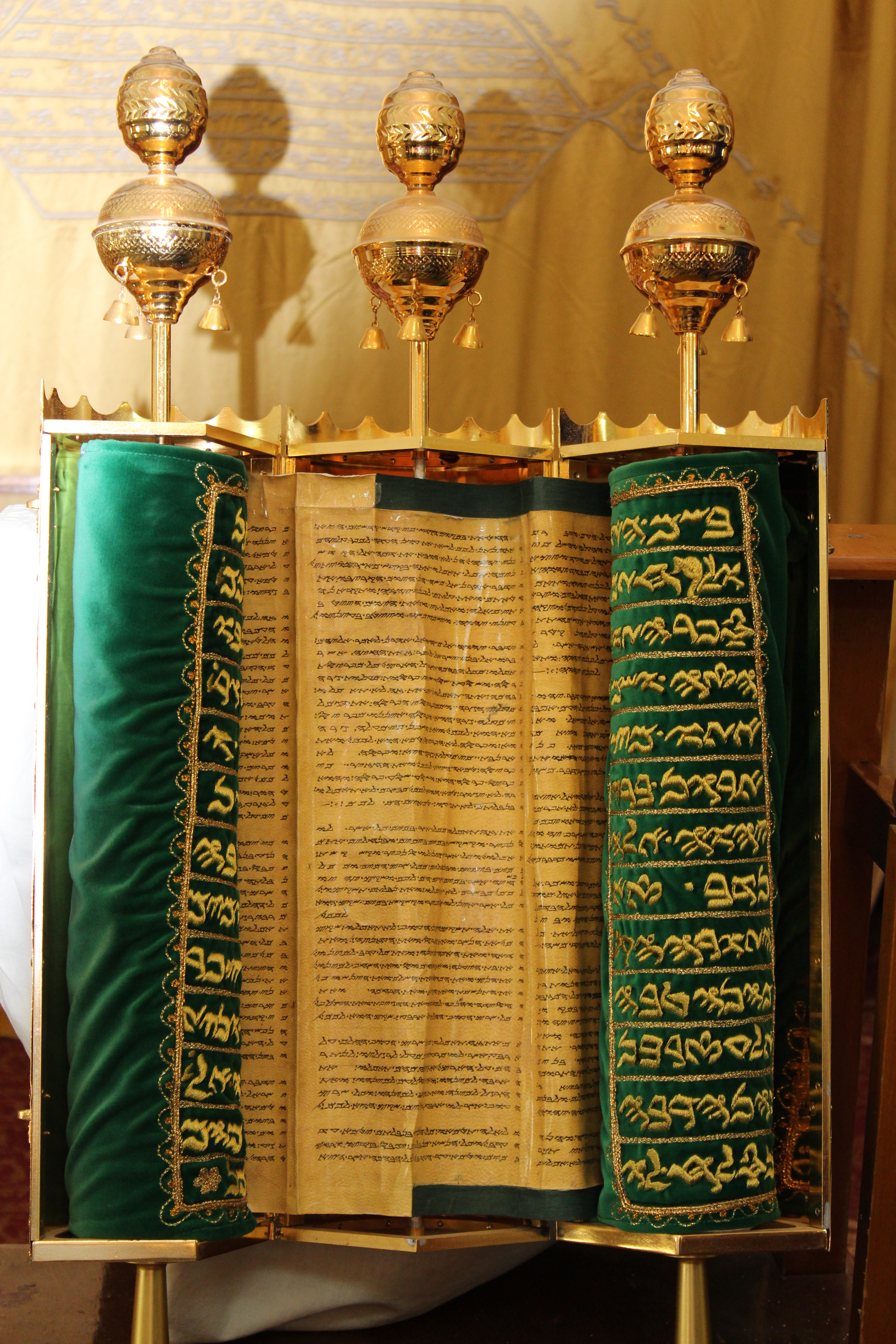
Samaritan Torah scroll, Mount Gerizim Samaritan synagogue, Mount Gerizim. The Rimmonim can be seen on top of the rollers.

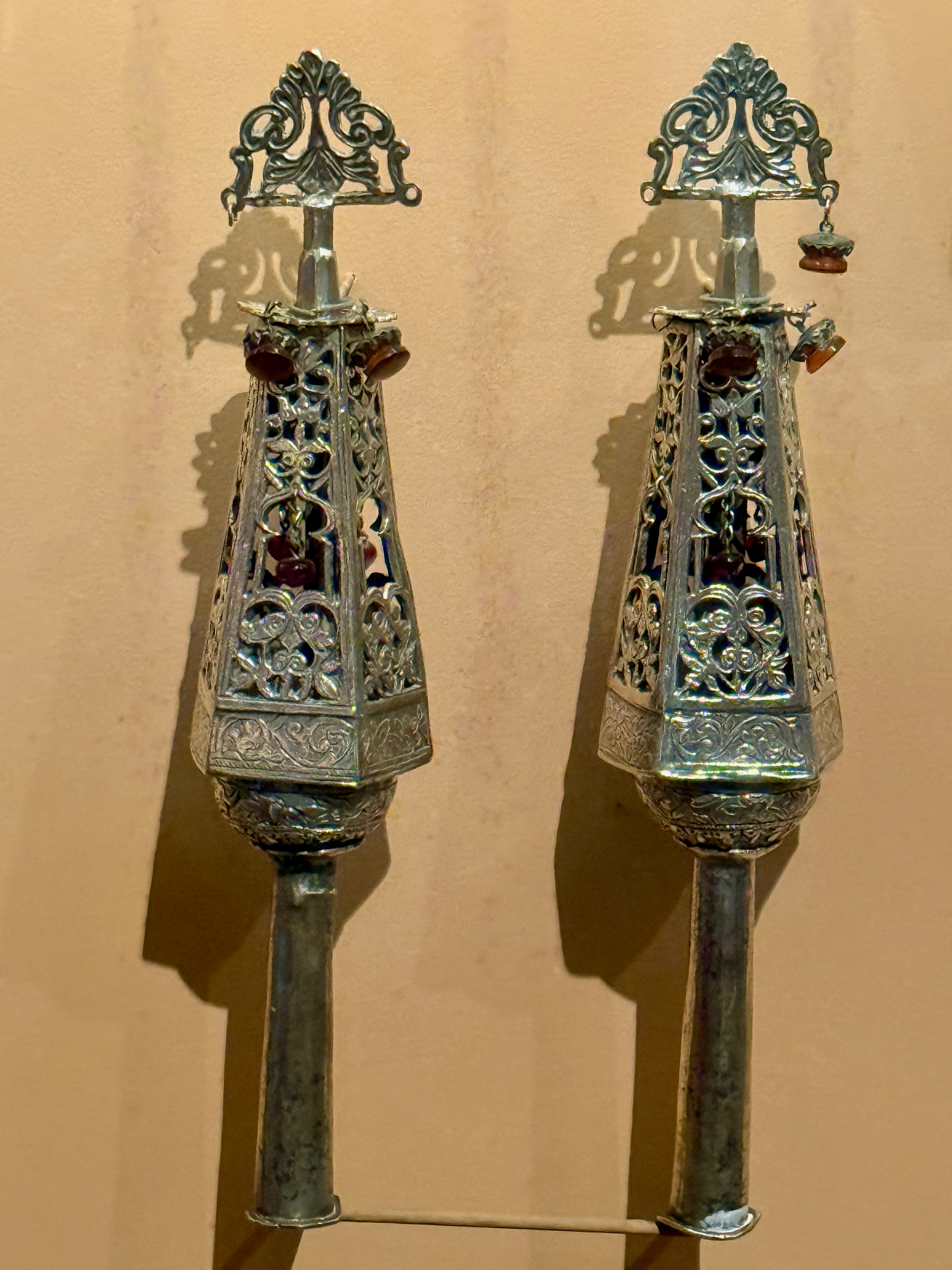
These silver finials include hanging red and yellow ornaments, a common feature of rimonim

Torah finials or rimonim / rimmonim (Hebrew: רִמּוֹנִיִם, lit. "pomegranates"), singular: rimmon / rimon) are silver or gold finials adorning the top ends of the rollers (עצי חיים Atzei Chaim) of a Sefer Torah (Torah scroll). Very often the rimonim are adorned with little bells and are very intricate. Rimmonim are usually hollow, at least in the bottom section, and are generally made of silver, but cedar and other woods can be used for cheaper and fragrant Rimmonim.

== Etymology ==
Rimmonim/Rimmonim, in Hebrew (Hebrew: רִמּוֹנִיִם, translates to pomegranate, a very important fruit in Jewish culture. Pomegranates are said to have 613 seeds in them, like the 613 mitzvot of the Torah. Its ceremonial purpose is to remind Jews of their obligation to follow the mitzvot.

== Bells ==
Rimmonim often have bells on them, which are commonly associated with Aaron, Moses' brother and the first High Priest of Israel in the Torah. The high priest of Israel's robe had bells on it, thus the bells on the Rimmonim. It is also said the Rimmonim's bells call attention to the fact that God's word is present and those who are near should pay attention.

== Materials ==
Rimmonim can be made out of many materials, most often silver as it is most easy to engrave on silver, but cedar tree, olive tree, and other woods may be used for its cost and fragrance. Gold can be used, but its fragility, rarity, and cost makes it an uncommon material for rimmonim.

== See also ==
- Rimmon
- Torah crown (see Keter Torah)
