= Rammun =

- Palestinian town

Arabic transcription(s)
  - Arabic: رمّون
  - Latin: Rammun (official)
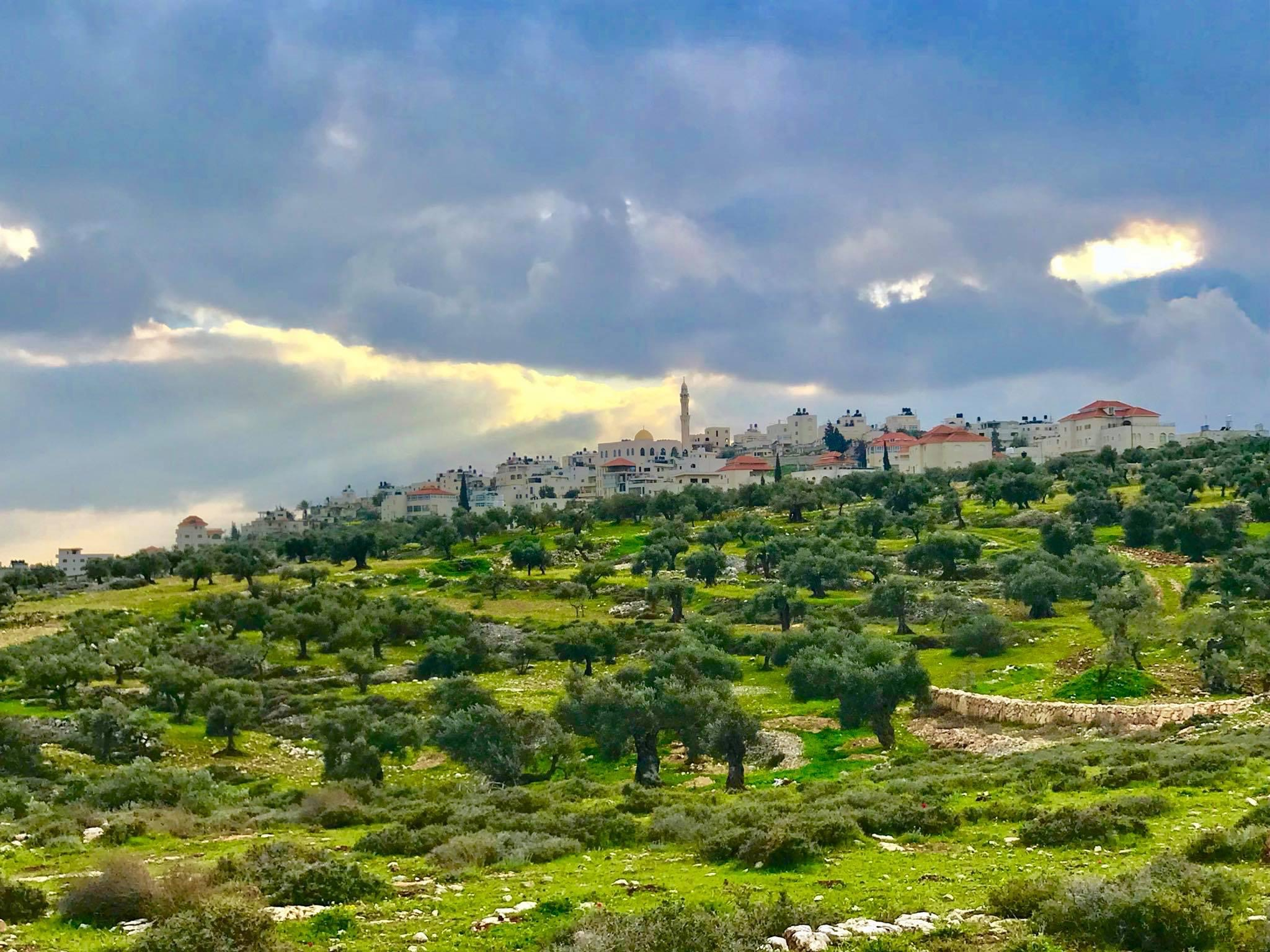

- Location of Rammun within Palestine
- Coordinates: 31°55′47″N 35°17′56″E
- Palestine grid: 178/148
- State: State of Palestine
- Governorate: Ramallah and al-Bireh

Government
  - Type: Municipality
  - Head of Village Mosque: Abo Amir Shawakha
- Elevation: 745 m (2,444 ft)
- Highest elevation: 1,600 m (5,200 ft)
- Lowest elevation: 500 m (1,600 ft)

Population (2017)
  - Total: 2,405
- Name meaning: Rock Rimmon

Rammun (Arabic: رمّون) is a Palestinian town in the Ramallah and al-Bireh Governorate in the central West Bank, located twelve kilometers east of Ramallah and three kilometers south of Taybeh. Other nearby towns include Deir Dibwan to the southwest, Beitin to the east and Ein Yabrud to the northeast.

== History and archeology ==
Sherds from Iron Age I, Hellenistic, Roman, Byzantine, Crusader/Ayyubid and Mamluk eras have been found.

Mosaics and ancient cisterns have been found.

Van der Velde (in 1854) assumed that Rammun was the place mentioned in the Bible as Rimmon, Sela Rimmon. The Rock of Rimmon was where the Benjamites fled (Judges 20:45, 47; 21:13), and where they maintained themselves for four months after the battle at Gibeah.

It also is suggested to be the town of Remmon (Ancient Greek: Ρεμμων, Remmōn) mentioned in the Onomasticon and in the Map of Madaba, located fifteen miles north of Jerusalem, between Bethel and Jericho.

There are Byzantine, Crusader, Ayyubid, Mamluk and Ottoman remains in the town including a mosaic in the town's mosque, an ancient burial cave and sanitary pit. The burial cave dates back to Byzantine times and contained pottery lamps, sandals and cross-shaped medallions. Beside the village is a cave named "The Christian's Cave".

=== Ottoman era ===
In 1596, Rammun appeared in Ottoman tax registers as being in the Nahiya of the Liwa of Quds, with a population of 39 Muslim households. The villagers paid a fixed tax rate of 33.3% on various agricultural products, including wheat, barley, olives, and vines or fruit trees; a total of 5,700 akçe. Sherds from the early Ottoman era have been also found.

In 1838, Edward Robinson noted Rummon as a Muslim village in the District of Beni Salim, east of Jerusalem, located "on a naked conical point of the ridge, rising steeply on the N[orth] side of the valley, the houses being apparently built in terraces around the hill from the top downwards."

The French explorer Victor Guérin first visited the village in 1863, and described it as a village with five hundred inhabitants. He further noted that in the limestone mountain around it were drilled numerous caves, many of which were still used by shepherds and their flocks. Ancient cisterns dug into the rock were also found. The houses were partly built with antique materials, including some large blocks cut ashlars.

An Ottoman village list of about 1870 showed that Rammun had 81 houses and a population of 334, though the population count included men only. The village was described as being in the Beni Salim area.

In the 1882, the PEF's Survey of Western Palestine described Rammun as "A village of moderate size, with cisterns and caves, evidently an ancient site. On the north-east is a deep rockcut tank, and south of it a rock-cut tomb. The houses stand on a barren conical point of rock north of a rough valley, and are built in terraces. The site is peculiar, being at the end of a plateau of arable soil extending southwards from Taiyibeh. The view is extensive towards the south-east, but bounded by the Taiyibeh range on the north. There are numerous caves in the rocky sides of the hill called Ashkaf Jiljal, as well as further west (Ashkaf Daud)."

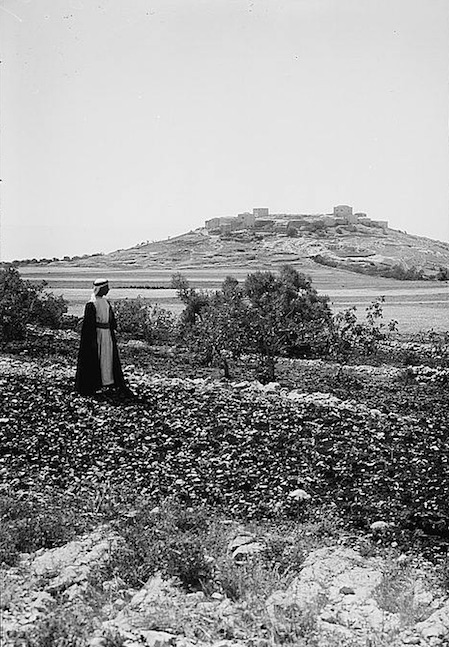
Rammun, ca 1900 to 1920

In 1896 the population of Rammun was estimated to be about 705 persons.

=== British Mandate era ===
In the 1922 census of Palestine conducted by the British Mandate authorities, Rammun had a population of 703, all Muslims, while in the 1931 census, the village had 153 occupied houses and a population of 744, still all Muslims.

In the 1945 statistics the population was 970 Muslims, while the total land area was 30,043 dunams, according to an official land and population survey. Of this, 2,338 were allocated for plantations and irrigable land, 7,181 for cereals, while 61 dunams were classified as built-up areas.

=== Jordanian era ===
In the wake of the 1948 Arab–Israeli War, and after the 1949 Armistice Agreements, Rammun came under Jordanian rule.

In 1961, the population of Rammun was 1,186 persons.

=== Post-1967 ===
During the Six-Day War in 1967, Rammun came under Israeli occupation.

After the 1995 accords, 1.6% of Rammun’s land was classified as Area A, 27% was classified as Area B, while the remaining 71.4% is classified as Area C.

In 2017, there were 2,405 villagers in Rammun. There are about 7,000 former residents and their descendants living in the diaspora, mainly in the United States. Many in the diaspora have summer homes in the village, though these homes have been frequently broken into.

=== 2012 shootings ===
In March 2012, a Duvdevan Unit in civilian clothing entered Rammun, reportedly on a night-time training exercise were mistaken for burglars by three brothers of the Shawakhah family. All three brothers were shot multiple times in the confrontation that followed that also involved uniformed IDF soldiers, and Rashad Shawakhah died of his wounds several days later in hospital. Israeli Army Radio initially reported that terrorists had attacked an IDF soldier during a military operation. An IDF soldier who kicked one of the wounded handcuffed men after the shooting was reportedly dismissed shortly after the incident. B'Tselem, who have stated that the undercover unit's operational method and rules of engagement violate international law, requested the army's Criminal Investigations Division to examine the incident. The military advocate general opened an investigation in May 2012.

== See also ==
- Rimonim, an Israeli settlement nearby with related etymology

== Bibliography ==
- Barron, J.B., ed. (1923). Palestine: Report and General Abstracts of the Census of 1922. Government of Palestine.
- Conder, C.R.; Kitchener, H.H. (1882). The Survey of Western Palestine: Memoirs of the Topography, Orography, Hydrography, and Archaeology. Vol. 2. London: Committee of the Palestine Exploration Fund.
- Dauphin, C. (1998). La Palestine byzantine, Peuplement et Populations. BAR International Series 726 (in French). Vol. III : Catalogue. Oxford: Archeopress. ISBN 0-860549-05-4.
- Finkelstein, I.; Lederman, Zvi, eds. (1997). Highlands of many cultures. Tel Aviv: Institute of Archaeology of Tel Aviv University Publications Section. ISBN 965-440-007-3.
- Government of Jordan, Department of Statistics (1964). First Census of Population and Housing. Volume I: Final Tables; General Characteristics of the Population (PDF).
- Government of Palestine, Department of Statistics (1945). Village Statistics, April, 1945.
- Guérin, V. (1869). Description Géographique Historique et Archéologique de la Palestine (in French). Vol. 1: Judee, pt. 3. Paris: L'Imprimerie Nationale.
- Guérin, V. (1874). Description Géographique Historique et Archéologique de la Palestine (in French). Vol. 2: Samarie, pt. 1. Paris: L'Imprimerie Nationale.
- Hadawi, S. (1970). Village Statistics of 1945: A Classification of Land and Area ownership in Palestine. Palestine Liberation Organization Research Center.
- Hartmann, M. (1883). "Die Ortschaftenliste des Liwa Jerusalem in dem türkischen Staatskalender für Syrien auf das Jahr 1288 der Flucht (1871)". Zeitschrift des Deutschen Palästina-Vereins. 6: 102–149.
- Hütteroth, W.-D.; Abdulfattah, K. (1977). Historical Geography of Palestine, Transjordan and Southern Syria in the Late 16th Century. Erlanger Geographische Arbeiten, Sonderband 5. Erlangen, Germany: Vorstand der Fränkischen Geographischen Gesellschaft. ISBN 3-920405-41-2.
- Mills, E., ed. (1932). Census of Palestine 1931. Population of Villages, Towns and Administrative Areas. Jerusalem: Government of Palestine.
- Palmer, E.H. (1881). The Survey of Western Palestine: Arabic and English Name Lists Collected During the Survey by Lieutenants Conder and Kitchener, R. E. Transliterated and Explained by E.H. Palmer. Committee of the Palestine Exploration Fund.
- Robinson, E.; Smith, E. (1841). Biblical Researches in Palestine, Mount Sinai and Arabia Petraea: A Journal of Travels in the year 1838. Vol. 2. Boston: Crocker & Brewster.
- Robinson, E.; Smith, E. (1841). Biblical Researches in Palestine, Mount Sinai and Arabia Petraea: A Journal of Travels in the year 1838. Vol. 3. Boston: Crocker & Brewster.
- Schick, C. (1896). "Zur Einwohnerzahl des Bezirks Jerusalem". Zeitschrift des Deutschen Palästina-Vereins. 19: 120–127.
- Socin, A. (1879). "Alphabetisches Verzeichniss von Ortschaften des Paschalik Jerusalem". Zeitschrift des Deutschen Palästina-Vereins. 2: 135–163.
- Velde, van de, C.W.M. (1854). Narrative of a journey through Syria and Palestine in 1851 and 1852. Vol. 2. William Blackwood and son.
