= Rimon =

Rimon may refer to:

== People ==
- Rimon Hossain (born 2005), Bangladeshi footballer
- Showkat Hasanur Rahman Rimon (born 1964), Bangladeshi politician
- Yosef Zvi Rimon (born 1968), Israeli rabbi and author

== Other uses ==
- Rimon-et-Savel, a commune in France
- Rimon (magazine), a Hebrew magazine
- Café Rimon, an Israeli restaurant chain
- Rimon Winery, an Israeli winery
- Rimon School of Jazz and Contemporary Music, a music school in Ramat Hasharon, Israel
- Operation Rimon 20, a 1970 aerial battle between Israel and Soviet pilots stationed in Egypt
- Another name of Hadad, storm and rain god

== See also ==
- Rimonim (disambiguation)
- Beit Rimon, а populated place in Israel
- Gat Rimon, an agricultural community in Israel
- Rimmon
- Rimons, a commune in France
