= Deir Dibwan =

Deir Debwan
- Municipality type D (Village council)

Arabic transcription(s)
  - Arabic: دير دبوان
  - Latin: Deir Debwan (official); Dayr Debwan (unofficial)
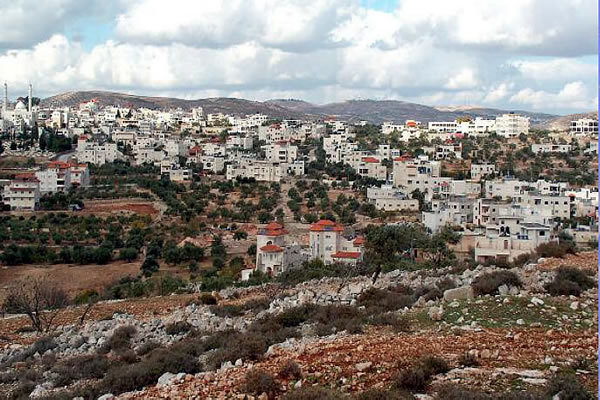

- Location of Deir Debwan within Palestine
- Coordinates: 31°54′39″N 35°16′14″E
- Palestine grid: 175/146
- State: State of Palestine
- Governorate: Ramallah and al-Bireh

Government
  - Type: Village council
- Elevation: 739 m (2,425 ft)

Population (2017)
  - Total: 4,169
- Name meaning: "The Monastery of the Divan"

Deir Dibwan (Arabic: دير دبوان) is a Palestinian city in the Ramallah and al-Bireh Governorate in the central West Bank east of Ramallah. According to the Palestinian Central Bureau of Statistics the town had a population of 4,169 inhabitants in 2017. There were 5,016 people from Deir Dibwan living abroad. Deir Dibwan was built close to the ruins of Et-Tell.

== Name ==
The word "Deir" means monastery and the word "dibwan" came from the name of the "divan", or Council. It has also been called Deir Dubwan, where "Dubwan" is a proper name.

== Location ==
Deir Dibwan is located 6.4 kilometers (4.0 mi) (horizontally) east of Ramallah. It is bordered by Ein ad-Duyuk al-Foqa to the east, Rammun and Ein Yabrud to the north, Beitin and Burqa to the west and Mukhmas and 'Anata to the south.

== History ==
Just west of the village is et-Tell, an archaeological mound commonly identified with Ai of the Bible. South of the town is another ruin, Khirbet el-Haiyan.

Potsherds from the Middle Bronze Age, Iron Age II, Hellenistic/Roman, Byzantine, Crusader/Ayyubid and Mamluk era have been found.

Deir Dibwan have been identified with the Crusader site named Dargebaam, or Dargiboan.

=== Ottoman era ===
In 1517, the village was included in the Ottoman Empire with the rest of Palestine, and in the 1596 tax-records it appeared as duhaniyya, located in the Nahiya of Quds of the Liwa of Al-Quds. The population was 71 households, all Muslim. They paid a fixed tax rate of 33.3% on agricultural products, such as wheat, barley, olive trees, vineyards/fruit trees, goats and beehives, in addition to occasional revenues; a total of 30,000 akçe. Potsherds from the early Ottoman era have also been found.

In 1838, Edward Robinson described Deir Dibwan as being "tolerably wealthy", and reportedly the producer of great quantities of figs. It was noted as a Muslim village, located in the area immediately north of Jerusalem.

The Victor Guérin visited the village in July 1863, and described it as having five hundred inhabitants, situated on a rocky plateau. The highest point of the plateau was occupied by the remains of an old construction, which people referred to as Ed-Deir (the Monastery). He also note several cisterns dug into the rock, which he assumed dated from antiquity. An Ottoman village list of about 1870 showed that "Der Diwan" had 161 houses and a population of 459, though the population count included only men.

In 1883, the PEF's Survey of Western Palestine described Deir Diwan as a "large and well-built stone village, standing on flat ground, with a rugged valley to the north and open ground to the south. There are a few scattered olives round the place. The inhabitants are partly Christian."

In 1896 the population of Der Diwan was estimated to be about 1,338 persons.

=== British Mandate era ===
In the 1922 census of Palestine conducted by the British Mandate authorities, the village, called Dair Dilwan, had a population of 1,382 Muslims, while in the 1931 census, the village had 384 occupied houses and a population of 1,688, still all Muslims.

In the 1945 statistics the population was 2,080 Muslims, while the total land area was 73,332 dunams, according to an official land and population survey. Of this, 5,052 were allocated for plantations and irrigable land, 10,695 for cereals, while 164 dunams were classified as built-up areas.

=== Jordanian era ===
In the wake the 1948 Arab–Israeli War, and after the 1949 Armistice Agreements, Deir Dibwan came under Jordanian rule. It was annexed by Jordan in 1950.

In 1961, the population of Deir Dibwan was 2,812.

=== 1967–present ===
Since the Six-Day War in 1967, Deir Dibwan has been under Israeli occupation.

After the 1995 accords, 0.2% of the village land was classified as Area A, 16.8% as Area B, and the remaining 83% as Area C. Israel has confiscated about 1,287 dunums of land from Deir Dibwan in order to construct the Israeli settlement of Ma'ale Mikhmas.

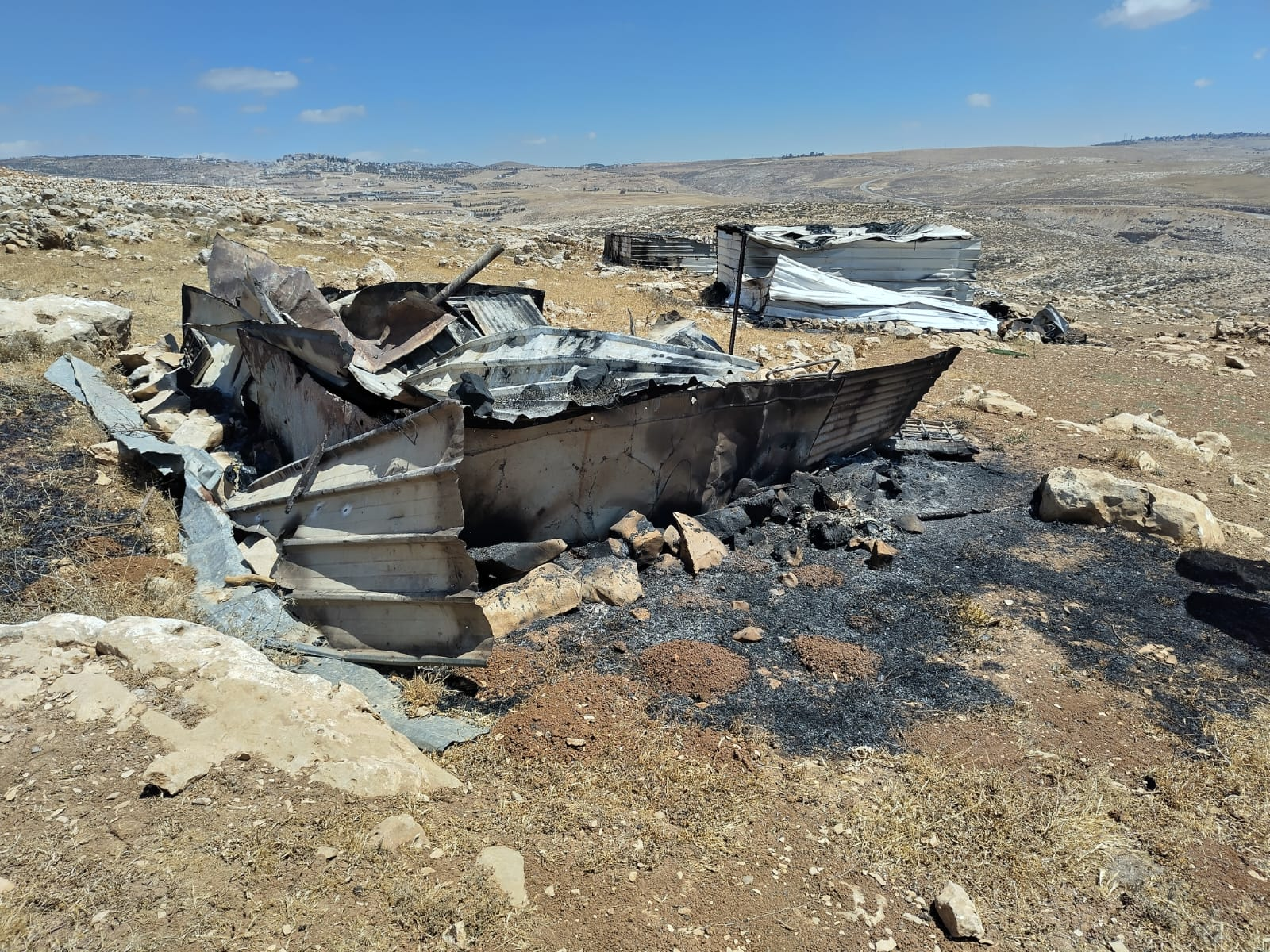
Arson by settlers in Deir Dibwan, May 2024

In May 2024 Israeli settlers attacked Deir Dibwan from the east, burning tents and sheep pens.

On December 26, 2025, settlers from the Or Meir outpost attacked the village. The attack began at night when settlers broke into a building, attacked and tied up two residents, and stole a herd of sheep. In the afternoon, dozens of settlers armed with rifles and cold weapons broke into the village, burned a house, and injured 12 residents.

==== Migron ====
According to the Israeli government, Israel's Supreme Court, and the Israeli organisation Peace Now, the land the illegal Israeli settlement of Migron sits on is owned by a number of Palestinian families living in Burqa and Deir Dibwan.

In August 2008 the settler leadership of Migron were to vote on an Israeli Defense Ministry proposal to relocate the unauthorized Migron outpost, possibly to an undeveloped area of a nearby settlement. From the Israeli government-commissioned Sasson Report it was concluded that more than 4 million NIS of public funds were illegally invested in the outpost. On 17 December 2006 the Israeli State responded a petition from the legal owners, Palestinians from Deir Dibwan and Burqa, the Israeli State admitted that there was never any authorisation from any official, granted for its establishment. In addition the Israeli State admitted the outpost stands on private Palestinian land. After Israeli Prime Minister Ehud Olmert and Israeli Defense Minister Ehud Barak decided to evacuate the unauthorized outpost of Migron the Israeli State Prosecution informed the Israeli High Court of Justice of the decision.

==== Deir Dibwan Association ====
The Deir Debwan Association is headquartered in New Jersey, United States. Membership is not limited to any specific clan or tribe. It has representatives from each clan or tribe, as well as refugee groups living in the town. The association serves to provide a link to the town, a source of identity to its members, to increase their members' honor and increase the town's honor as well. This association provides a source of honor for those in the United States and for relatives in the town.

== Shrine of ash-Sheikh Ammar ==
Southeast of the village is the shrine of ash-Sheikh Ammar (Arabic: الشيخ عمار), a religious site associated with Ammar ibn Yasir, a companion of Muhammad. According to local villagers, Ammar ibn Yasir passed through the area during one of his raids and stopped to pray. The tomb is a pilgrimage site for the Bedouin tribes of Ka'abneh and Jahalin, as well as villages east of the watershed. In 1999, villagers built a mosque in his honor, and in 2016, the site was renovated and turned into an amusement park named al-Biyara.

== Notable people ==
- Kamel Muhyieddeen (1928–1984), Palestinian political figure

== Bibliography ==
- Barron, J.B., ed. (1923). Palestine: Report and General Abstracts of the Census of 1922. Government of Palestine.
- Ben-Arieh, Yehoshua (1985). "The Sanjak of Jerusalem in the 1870s" (PDF). Cathedra (in Hebrew). 36: 73–122. Archived from the original (PDF) on 2020-07-22.
- Clermont-Ganneau, C.S. (1896). [ARP] Archaeological Researches in Palestine 1873-1874, translated from the French by J. McFarlane. Vol. 2. London: Palestine Exploration Fund. p. 283
- Conder, C.R. (1890). "Norman Palestine". Quarterly Statement - Palestine Exploration Fund. 22: 29–37. doi:10.1179/peq.1890.22.1.29.
- Conder, C.R.; Kitchener, H.H. (1883). The Survey of Western Palestine: Memoirs of the Topography, Orography, Hydrography, and Archaeology. Vol. 3. London: Committee of the Palestine Exploration Fund.
- Finkelstein, I.; Lederman, Zvi, eds. (1997). Highlands of many cultures. Tel Aviv: Institute of Archaeology of Tel Aviv University Publications Section. ISBN 965-440-007-3.
- Government of Jordan, Department of Statistics (1964). First Census of Population and Housing. Volume I: Final Tables; General Characteristics of the Population (PDF).
- Government of Palestine, Department of Statistics (1945). Village Statistics, April, 1945.
- Guérin, V. (1869). Description Géographique Historique et Archéologique de la Palestine (in French). Vol. 1: Judee, pt. 3. Paris: L'Imprimerie Nationale.
- Hadawi, S. (1970). Village Statistics of 1945: A Classification of Land and Area ownership in Palestine. Palestine Liberation Organization Research Center.
- Hartmann, M. (1883). "Die Ortschaftenliste des Liwa Jerusalem in dem türkischen Staatskalender für Syrien auf das Jahr 1288 der Flucht (1871)". Zeitschrift des Deutschen Palästina-Vereins. 6: 102–149.
- Hütteroth, W.-D.; Abdulfattah, K. (1977). Historical Geography of Palestine, Transjordan and Southern Syria in the Late 16th Century. Erlanger Geographische Arbeiten, Sonderband 5. Erlangen, Germany: Vorstand der Fränkischen Geographischen Gesellschaft. ISBN 3-920405-41-2.
- Mills, E., ed. (1932). Census of Palestine 1931. Population of Villages, Towns and Administrative Areas. Jerusalem: Government of Palestine.
- Palmer, E.H. (1881). The Survey of Western Palestine: Arabic and English Name Lists Collected During the Survey by Lieutenants Conder and Kitchener, R. E. Transliterated and Explained by E.H. Palmer. Committee of the Palestine Exploration Fund.
- Robinson, E.; Smith, E. (1841). Biblical Researches in Palestine, Mount Sinai and Arabia Petraea: A Journal of Travels in the year 1838. Vol. 2. Boston: Crocker & Brewster.
- Robinson, E.; Smith, E. (1841). Biblical Researches in Palestine, Mount Sinai and Arabia Petraea: A Journal of Travels in the year 1838. Vol. 3. Boston: Crocker & Brewster.
- Schick, C. (1896). "Zur Einwohnerzahl des Bezirks Jerusalem". Zeitschrift des Deutschen Palästina-Vereins. 19: 120–127.
- Socin, A. (1879). "Alphabetisches Verzeichniss von Ortschaften des Paschalik Jerusalem". Zeitschrift des Deutschen Palästina-Vereins. 2: 135–163.
- Toledano, E. (1984). "The Sanjaq of Jerusalem in the Sixteenth Century: Aspects of Topography and Population". Archivum Ottomanicum. 9: 279–319. Archived from the original on 2016-03-05.
