= Giv'at Asaf =

Israeli settlement in the West Bank

Giv'at Asaf: גִּבְעַת אָסָף (Hebrew)
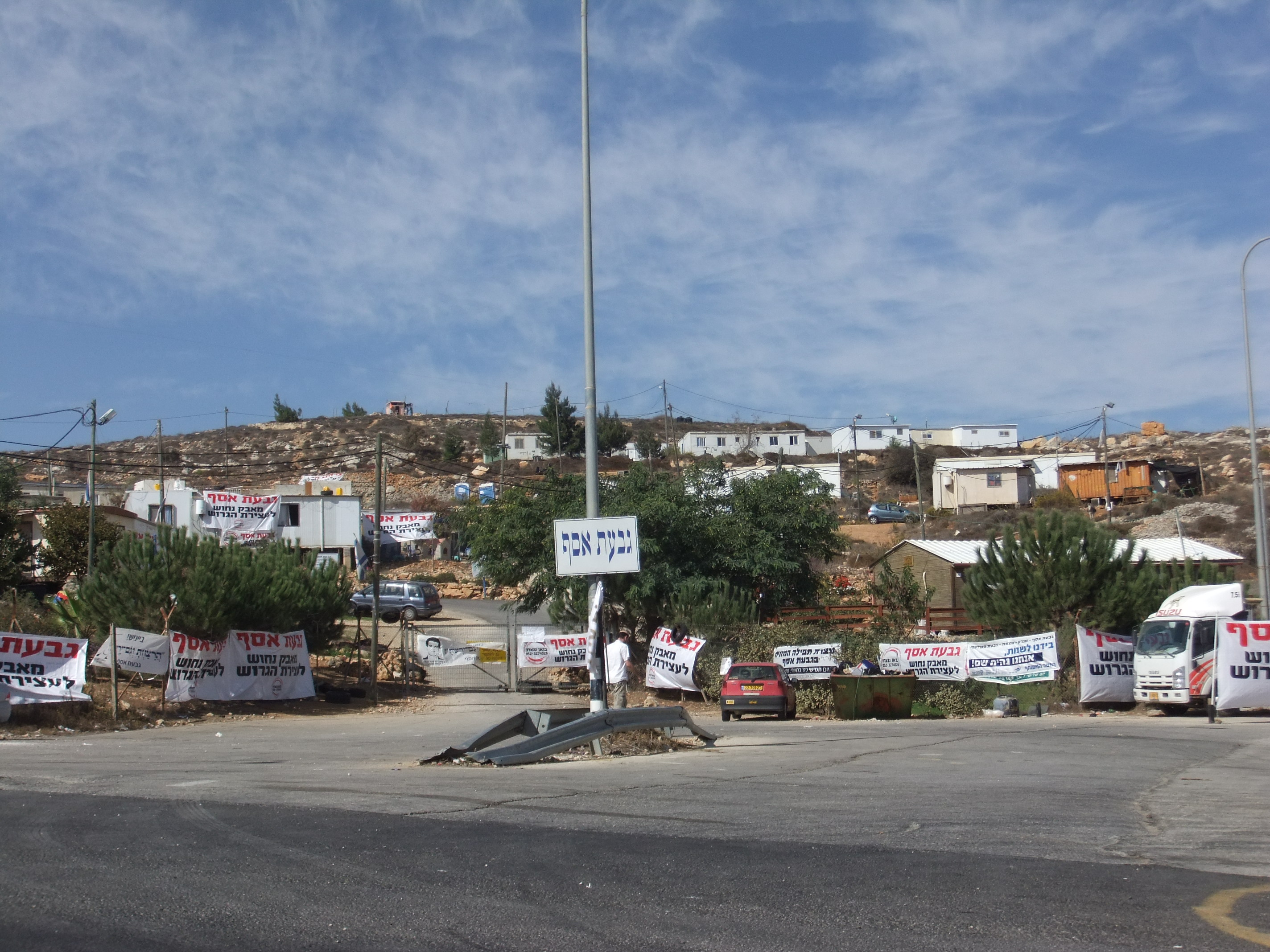
- Giv'at Asaf, fall 2011

- Location within the Central West Bank Location within the West Bank
- Coordinates: 31°54′41″N 35°14′56″E
- Country: Israel
- District: Judea and Samaria Area
- Council: Mateh Binyamin
- Region: West Bank
- Founded: May 2001, legalized 2024

Giv'at Asaf (Hebrew: גִּבְעַת אָסָף, lit. 'Asaf Hill') is an Israeli settlement in the West Bank. Located 3.5 kilometres (2 1/4 miles) from the settlement of Beit El, it falls under the jurisdiction of the Mateh Binyamin Regional Council. It has about 30 structures and is home to some 30 families. It was established in May 2001 after the murder of Asaf Hershkovitz, a resident of Ofra, for whom it was named. According to the 2005 Sasson Report, Giv'at Asaf was built on privately owned Palestinian land, and is therefore also illegal under Israeli law. It was legalized by the Israeli government in 2024.

The international community considers Israeli settlements in the West Bank illegal under international law, but the Israeli government disputes this.

== History ==
Giv'at Asaf was established in 2001 and named after Assaf Hershkovitz, a 31-year-old settler from Ofra, an Israeli settlement northeast of Ramallah, who was shot dead by Palestinian gunmen. A placard was placed at the entrance of the outpost that said "We have come back home". According to Benny Gal, the community leader, "On this exact spot, 3,800 years ago, the land of Israel was promised to the Hebrew people". A demarcation order was issued in 2004, and renewed in 2006, to establish the boundaries of the outpost, but building beyond it went on despite the order.

In 2004 Defense Minister Shaul Mofaz issued an order to evacuate illegal outposts, including Giv'at Asaf. In 2006 Mofaz's successor Amir Peretz extended the evacuation order by two years following a petition filed by the settlers, announcing that at the end of that period the settlers would be evacuated by force if needed. In 2008 Defense Minister Ehud Barak announced that the order would be extended for an additional year, during which the state would attempt to negotiate with the settlers. In May 2009, in response to a petition filed by Peace Now, the Supreme Court issued an order demanding that the state explain within 90 days why the illegal outposts have not yet been evacuated.

A case involving the forging of documents for a land sale at Giv'at Asaf led to an indictment for illegal land transference from Palestinians to Israelis in 2007. The Jerusalem Magistrate's Court Judge's decision in October 2009 said "The move was intended to transfer lands owned by Arab residents to the ownership of Jews. The success of the conspiracy by the accused and his colleagues was liable, with very great likelihood, to have aroused hostilities between population groups in this context that could have been considered land theft."

In March 2011, in response to another petition by Peace Now, the Israeli government announced its decision to dismantle all illegal outposts built on private Palestinian land by the end of 2011, including Giv'at Asaf. The residents of Giv'at Asaf vowed "a violent struggle" against their removal. In November 2011 the government asked the Supreme Court for an extension on the Giv'at Asaf demolition, stating it was in talks with the outpost's representatives and was asking them to leave by 1 July 2012.

In 2011 fifteen gravestones in the Mamilla Cemetery were spray painted with red graffiti that said "Death to the Arabs" and the name of the Giv'at Asaf outpost in a "price-tag" attack. In November 2011, the apartment building in Jerusalem where Peace Now's Settlement Watch director Hagit Ofran lives was sprayed with the slogans "the revenge of Givat Assaf", "regards from Oz Zion", and "death to Hagit Ofran". Haaretz reported that it was probably a response to the Oz Zion outpost's evacuation and the government's decision to evacuate the Giv'at Asaf outpost.

In May 2013 the Israeli government announced it was considering legalizing Giv'at Asaf and three other unauthorized outposts. The government claimed that while Giv'at Asaf had originally been deemed problematic, the land on which it sat had since been purchased. In response, the US State Department said the US would not "accept the legitimacy of continued Israeli settlement activity" and that "continued settlement activity is counterproductive to the cause of peace".

In May 2014 settlers dismantled four homes in the outpost built on private Palestinian property in accordance with a High Court of Justice order issued in response to a 2007 petition by Peace Now.

Two IDF soldiers were shot and killed near the settlement on 13 December 2018.

On June 27, 2024, the Israeli government legalized Giv'at Asaf.

== Impact on Palestinians ==
According to Haaretz, in 2012 Palestinians from the village of Burqa were unable to access the direct road that links their village to Route 60 and the neighboring village of Beitin, which resulted in what was "a trip of a few minutes" becoming "a long, circuitous journey".
