= Beitin =

- Municipality type D (Village council)

Arabic transcription(s)
  - Arabic: بيتين
  - Latin: Baytin (official); Bittin (unofficial)
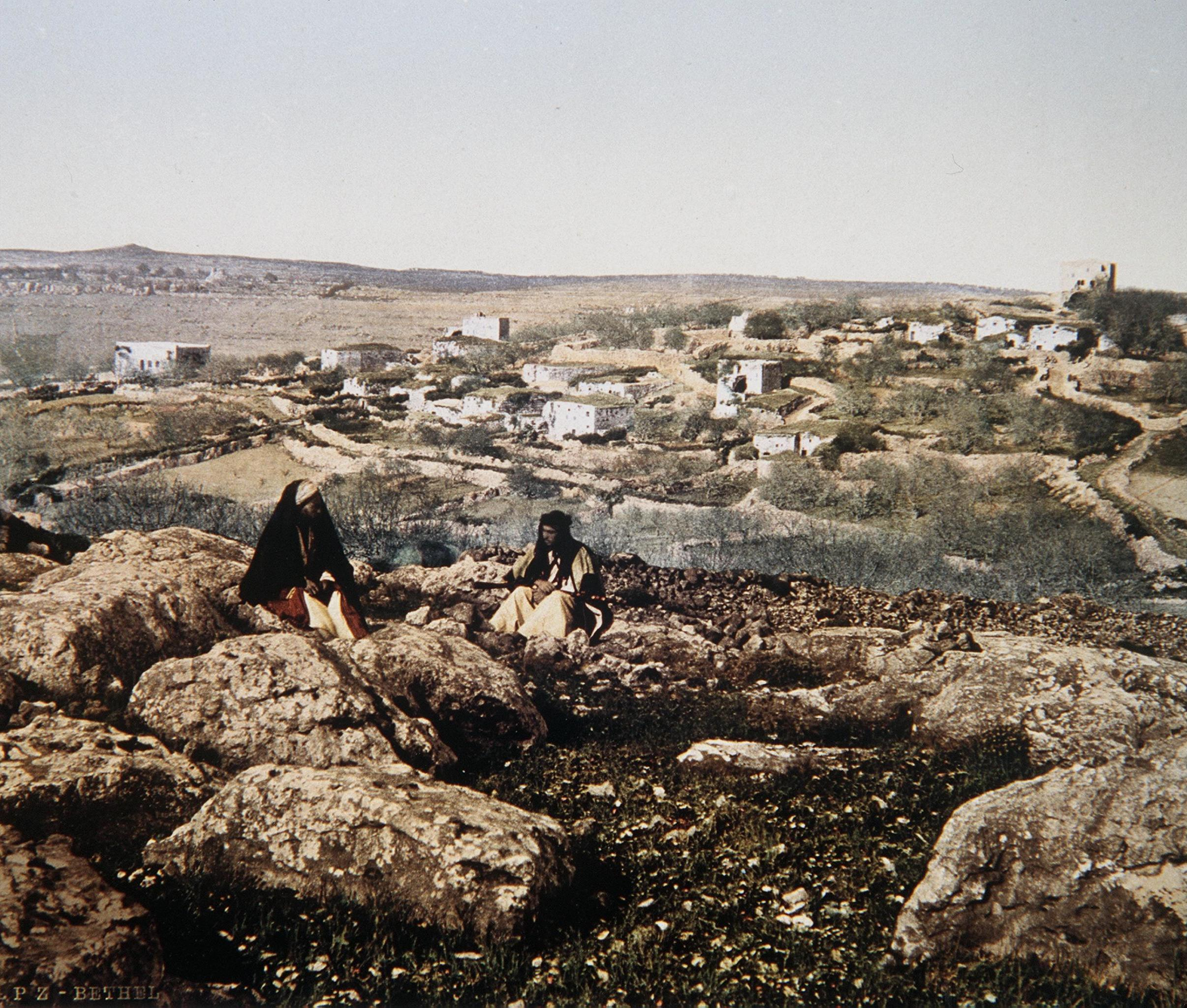
- Beitin, late 19th century, by Felix Bonfils

- Location of Beitin within Palestine
- Coordinates: 31°55′42″N 35°14′18″E
- Palestine grid: 172/148
- State: State of Palestine
- Governorate: Ramallah and al-Bireh
- Founded: Early 19th century

Government
  - Type: Village council (from 1996)
  - Head of Municipality: DIAB YASIN

Area
  - Total: 4.8 km^{2} (1.9 sq mi)

Population (2017)
  - Total: 2,242
  - Density: 470/km^{2} (1,200/sq mi)
- 5k
- house of faith: corruption of the Hebrew "Bethel", house ("beth" or "beit") of God ("el")

Beitin (Arabic: بيتين, romanized: Baytīn) is a Palestinian village in the Ramallah and al-Bireh Governorate in the central West Bank, located 5 kilometers (3.1 mi) northeast of Ramallah along the Ramallah-Nablus road. The Palestinian village of Dura al-Qar' and Ein Yabrud lie to the north, Rammun to the east, Deir Dibwan to the southeast and al-Bireh to the southwest. The Israeli settlement of Beit El is northwest of Beitin.

Beitin was established in the mid-19th century by settlers from the nearby Burqa. It stands on the site of the ancient town and biblical sanctuary of Bethel, which was left abandoned after the Crusader period. The area remained uninhabited until the late Ottoman period, when modern Beitin was founded.

== Geography ==
There are several springs around Beitin, which is known for its olive, almond, fig and plum groves.

== History ==
=== Early history and archaeology ===
Beitin is identified with the ancient settlement of Bethel, and preserves its ancient name. The site was first settled during the Chalcolithic period. Sherds from the Early, Intermediate, Middle and Late Bronze Age, as well as the Iron Age I and II, the Persian, Hellenistic, Roman, the Byzantine and Crusader/Ayyubid periods have been found. At the ruins of the Crusader watchtower (al-Burj), residential remains from the Mamluk period were discovered.

In the Hellenistic and Roman periods, Bethel was mentioned in 1 Maccabees, Josephus' writings, and in several patristic texts. The town was garrisoned by Bacchides (during the Maccabean revolt) and later by Vespasian (during the First Jewish–Roman War). In Byzantine times, Bethel held annual festivals on October 18. The population was Eastern Orthodox Christian and monks from the Sinai Peninsula, particularly Zosimas of Palestine, were known to have visited the town. A church dating from the fifth century CE was found at the site.

Bethel was abandoned after the 1187 defeat of the Crusaders at the hands of Saladin and the ensuing destruction of Christian sites. It remained obscure and unmentioned by various sources from the 13th to the 19th century, including Yaqut, Mujir al-Din, and European travelers, likely indicating a state of ruin since the fall of the Crusader kingdom.

=== Ottoman period ===
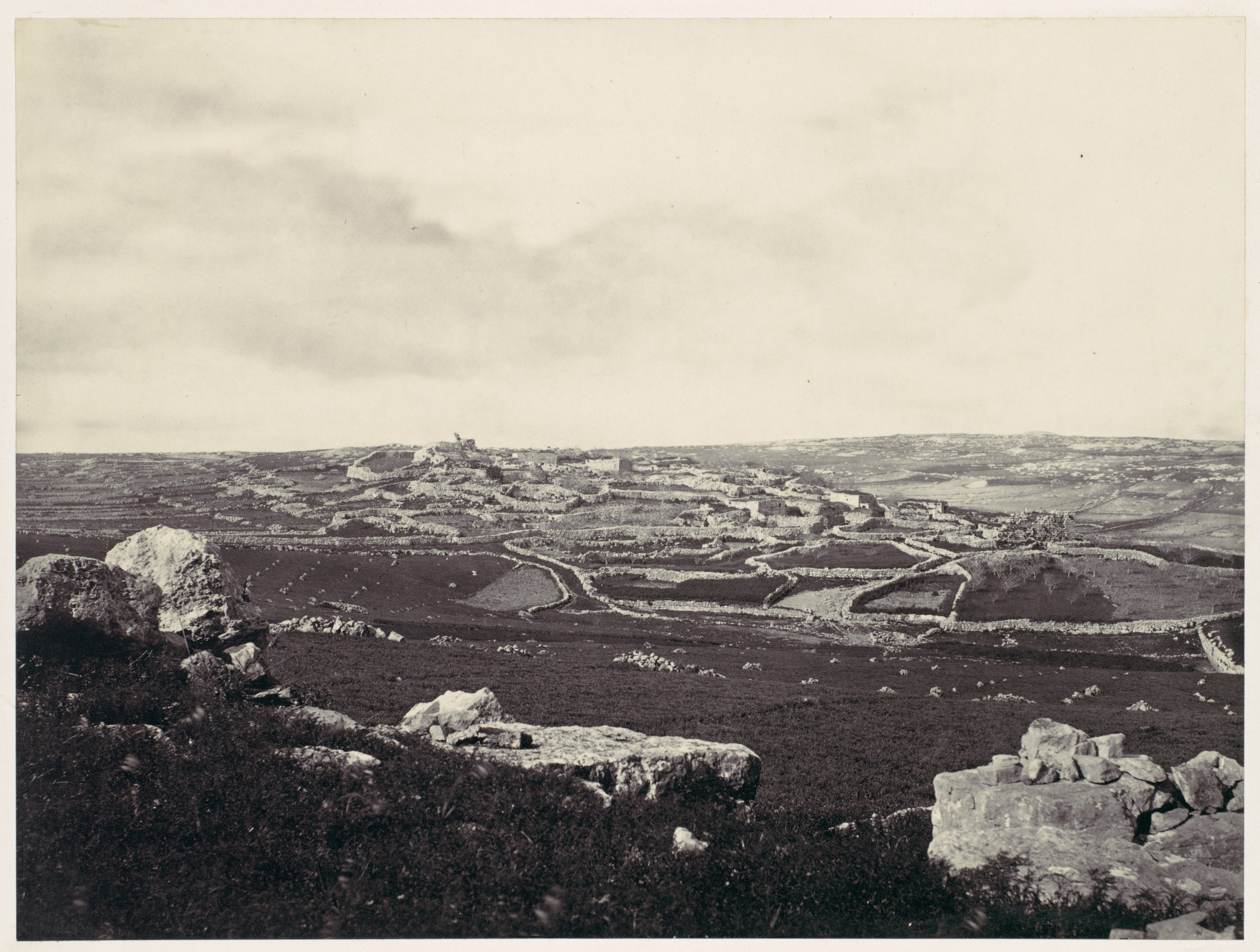
The ruins of Bethel in the mid-19th century

Beitin was absent from Ottoman censuses of the 16th century. When visited by Robinson in 1838 and Schwartz before 1845, it still lay in ruins. However, by Guérin's visit in 1863, it had become inhabited, with its residents originating from the nearby Burqa.

After Beitin was reestablished, the village came under the administration of the Mutasarrif ("Governorate") of Jerusalem. In the early 19th century, people from Transjordan and other places migrated to Beitin and built a mosque near the site of the old church.

In 1838 Edward Robinson noted Beitin as a place "in ruins or deserted," located immediately north of Jerusalem.

In 1863 Victor Guérin found the village to have 400 inhabitants, while an Ottoman village list from around 1870 showed that Beitin had an adult male population of 140, in a total of 55 houses (thus excluding women and children).

In 1882 the PEF's Survey of Western Palestine described Beitin as a village "built on the side of a flat spur which rises slightly on the north. On the south-east is a flat dell, with good fig and pomegranate gardens, and there are other fig-trees round the village and among the houses. The cottages have a ruinous appearance, with rough stone walls. There is one square white house in two stories, which is visible from a great distance. The ground is very open, and the slopes gentle; the village slopes down gradually south-east. The surrounding ground is quite bare of trees, of white chalk, very barren and stony on the south; of hard limestone cropping up on the north; the fields divided off by low drystone walls. The contrast of the grey rocks, the red ploughland and the dark green figs is very striking. The remains of a good-sized tower exist towards the north, and on the south the walls of a church of Crusading date, once dedicated to St. Joseph. The population is stated at 400. The place is supplied from a fine spring on the south, which wells up in a circular basin. The spring is double, and was surrounded with a large reservoir, 314 feet long north-west and south-east, by 217 feet; of massive stones. The eastern and southern walls are standing about 10 feet high. The spring is perennial..."

In 1896 the population of Betin was estimated to be about 360 persons.

In 1907, small gardens and a few old tombs were found in the vicinity, and the Muslim population was known for its strength and fearlessness.

=== British Mandate period ===
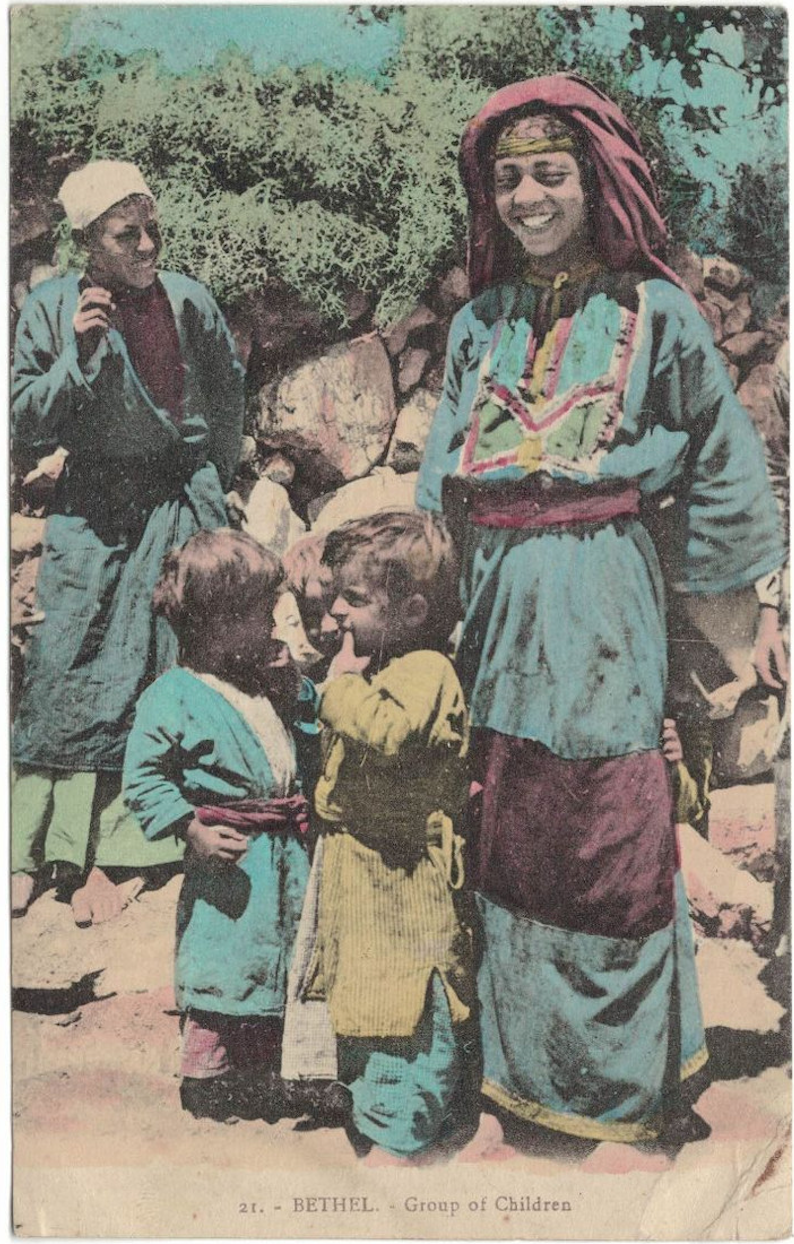
Young people in Beitin, ca 1925-30, postcard by Karimeh Abbud

In the 1922 census of Palestine conducted by the British Mandate authorities, Baitin had a population of 446; all Muslims, increasing at the time of the 1931 census to 566, still all Muslim, in 135 houses.

In the 1945 statistics the population was 690 Muslims, while the total land area was 4,764 dunams, according to an official land and population survey. Of this, 1,348 were allocated for plantations and irrigable land, 1,853 for cereals, while 38 dunams were classified as built-up areas.

=== Jordanian period ===
In the wake of the 1948 Arab–Israeli War, and after the 1949 Armistice Agreements, Beitin came under Jordanian rule.

In 1961, a Jordanian census found the population to be 1,017.

=== Post-1967 ===
After the Six-Day War in 1967, Beitin has, with the rest of the West Bank, been held under Israeli occupation. The population in the 1967 census conducted by the Israeli authorities was 958, of whom 134 originated from the Israeli territory.

After the 1995 accords, 19,1% of the village land is classified as Area B, while the remaining 80.9% is defined as Area C land (full Israeli control). Beitin village land has also been taken in order to construct the illegal Israeli outpost Givat Asaf.

On 19 December 2011, Israeli settlers were accused of carrying out a second price tag attack in only four days, in which five Palestinian-owned cars were burnt and the walls of several houses were sprayed with graffiti. During the first incident (15 December 2011), the assailants not only vandalized a mosque, but also attacked an IDF military base in the West Bank, injuring a top Israeli commander. According to witnesses of the second incident, the Israeli army dispersed the settlers without arresting any of them, presumably also those who attacked the Israeli commander, although four days earlier the incident had prompted Israeli Prime-Minister, Benjamin Netanyahu, to say: "We won't let them attack our soldiers. We won't let them ignite a religious war with our neighbors. We won't let them desecrate mosques. We won't let them harm Jews or Arabs."

== Landmarks ==
=== Church ruins ===
The ruins of the Byzantine church are known in Arabic as "al-Muqater" or "Khirbet al-Kenise" ("Ruins of the Church"). According to Röhricht, when the Crusaders arrived, they found a ruined church. They built another and placed it first under the Abbey of St. Joseph of Arimathea, later under the Canons of the Holy Sepulcher. The ruins of the church were drawn in the 1880s.

=== Tower ruins ("al-Burj") ===
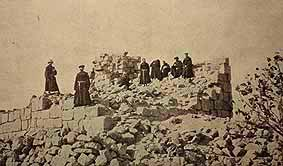
Ruins of al-Burj, 1935

Another ruin, called "al-Burj Beitin" ("the Tower of Beitin") or simply al-Burj is located in the western part of the village. They were also drawn in the 1880s. The ruins of the Burj are about 1 meter tall, and apparently built on the older ruins of a Byzantine monastery. Some have believed that it was constructed on the site where Abraham built an altar. According to biblical scholar Edward Robinson who visited Palestine in the 19th century, al-Burj Beitin consisted of dilapidated stones that used to form part of a fortress and a Greek church. Al-Burj was used as a watch tower by the Crusaders.

== Demographics ==
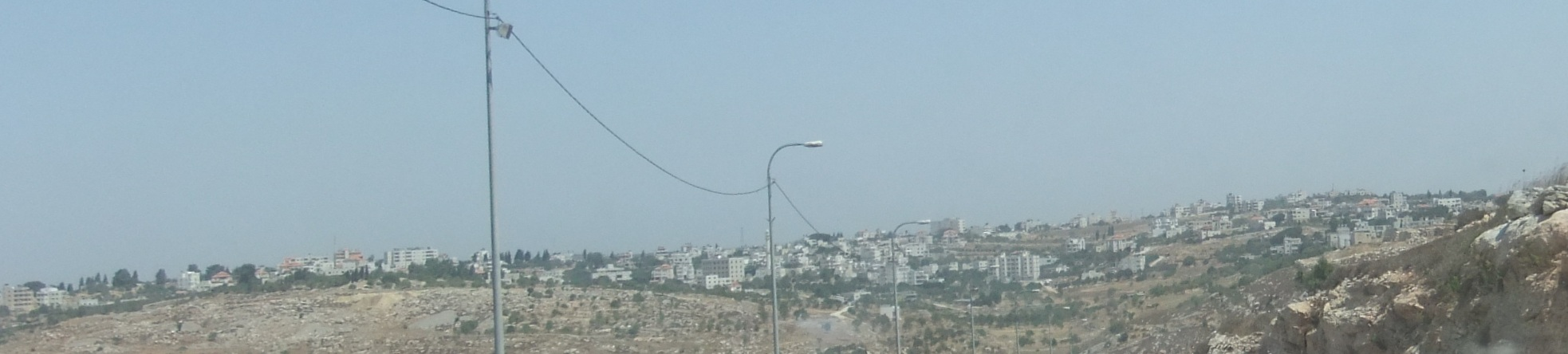
Roadside view of Beitin, 2011

In 1997, Palestinian refugees accounted for exactly 30% of the population, which was 1,510 at the time.

According to the Palestinian Central Bureau of Statistics (PCBS), Beitin had a population of over 3,050 inhabitants in 2006. In 2007, a PCBS census recorded a population of 2,143 (1,128 men and 1,015 women). There were 717 homes in the village and the average household size consisted of 4.9 family members.

== Bibliography ==
- Barron, J.B., ed. (1923). Palestine: Report and General Abstracts of the Census of 1922. Government of Palestine.
- Clermont-Ganneau, C.S. (1896). [ARP] Archaeological Researches in Palestine 1873-1874, translated from the French by J. McFarlane. Vol. 2. London: Palestine Exploration Fund. (p. 284)
- Conder, C.R.; Kitchener, H.H. (1882). The Survey of Western Palestine: Memoirs of the Topography, Orography, Hydrography, and Archaeology. Vol. 2. London: Committee of the Palestine Exploration Fund.
- Conder, C.R.; Kitchener, H.H. (1883). The Survey of Western Palestine: Memoirs of the Topography, Orography, Hydrography, and Archaeology. Vol. 3. London: Committee of the Palestine Exploration Fund.
- Dauphin, C. (1998). La Palestine byzantine, Peuplement et Populations. BAR International Series 726 (in French). Vol. III : Catalogue. Oxford: Archeopress. ISBN 0-860549-05-4.
- Easton, M.G. (1893). Illustrated Bible dictionary. Harper & brothers.
- Finkelstein, I.; Lederman, Zvi, eds. (1997). Highlands of many cultures. Tel Aviv: Institute of Archaeology of Tel Aviv University Publications Section. ISBN 965-440-007-3.
- Government of Jordan, Department of Statistics (1964). First Census of Population and Housing. Volume I: Final Tables; General Characteristics of the Population (PDF).
- Government of Palestine, Department of Statistics (1945). Village Statistics, April, 1945.
- Guérin, V. (1869). Description Géographique Historique et Archéologique de la Palestine (in French). Vol. 1: Judee, pt. 3. Paris: L'Imprimerie Nationale.
- Guérin, V. (1874). Description Géographique Historique et Archéologique de la Palestine (in French). Vol. 2: Samarie, pt. 1. Paris: L'Imprimerie Nationale. (pp. 205-206)
- Grant, E. (1907). The Peasantry of Palestine. Boston, New York [etc.]: The Pilgrim Press.
- Hadawi, S. (1970). Village Statistics of 1945: A Classification of Land and Area ownership in Palestine. Palestine Liberation Organization Research Center.
- Hartmann, M. (1883). "Die Ortschaftenliste des Liwa Jerusalem in dem türkischen Staatskalender für Syrien auf das Jahr 1288 der Flucht (1871)". Zeitschrift des Deutschen Palästina-Vereins. 6: 102–149.
- Lutfiyya, Abdulla M. (1966). Baytin : A Jordanian Village : A Study Of Social Institutions And Social Change In A Folk Community. Walter de Gruyter. ISBN 3111396150.
- Mills, E., ed. (1932). Census of Palestine 1931. Population of Villages, Towns and Administrative Areas. Jerusalem: Government of Palestine.
- Palmer, E.H. (1881). The Survey of Western Palestine: Arabic and English Name Lists Collected During the Survey by Lieutenants Conder and Kitchener, R. E. Transliterated and Explained by E.H. Palmer. Committee of the Palestine Exploration Fund.
- Pringle, D. (1993). The Churches of the Crusader Kingdom of Jerusalem: A-K (excluding Acre and Jerusalem). Vol. I. Cambridge University Press. ISBN 0-521-39036-2.
- Robinson, E.; Smith, E. (1841). Biblical Researches in Palestine, Mount Sinai and Arabia Petraea: A Journal of Travels in the year 1838. Vol. 2. Boston: Crocker & Brewster.
- Robinson, E.; Smith, E. (1841). Biblical Researches in Palestine, Mount Sinai and Arabia Petraea: A Journal of Travels in the year 1838. Vol. 3. Boston: Crocker & Brewster.
- Röhricht, R. (1887). "Studien zur mittelalterlichen Geographie und Topographie Syriens". Zeitschrift des Deutschen Palästina-Vereins. 10: 195–344.
- Schick, C. (1896). "Zur Einwohnerzahl des Bezirks Jerusalem". Zeitschrift des Deutschen Palästina-Vereins. 19: 120–127.
- Socin, A. (1879). "Alphabetisches Verzeichniss von Ortschaften des Paschalik Jerusalem". Zeitschrift des Deutschen Palästina-Vereins. 2: 135–163.
- Tristram, H.B. (1865). Land of Israel, A Journal of travel in Palestine, undertaken with special reference to its physical character. London: Society for Promoting Christian Knowledge.
- Wilson, C.W., ed. (c. 1881). Picturesque Palestine, Sinai and Egypt. Vol. 1. New York: D. Appleton.
