= Migron (Israeli settlement) =

Migron: מגרון (Hebrew)
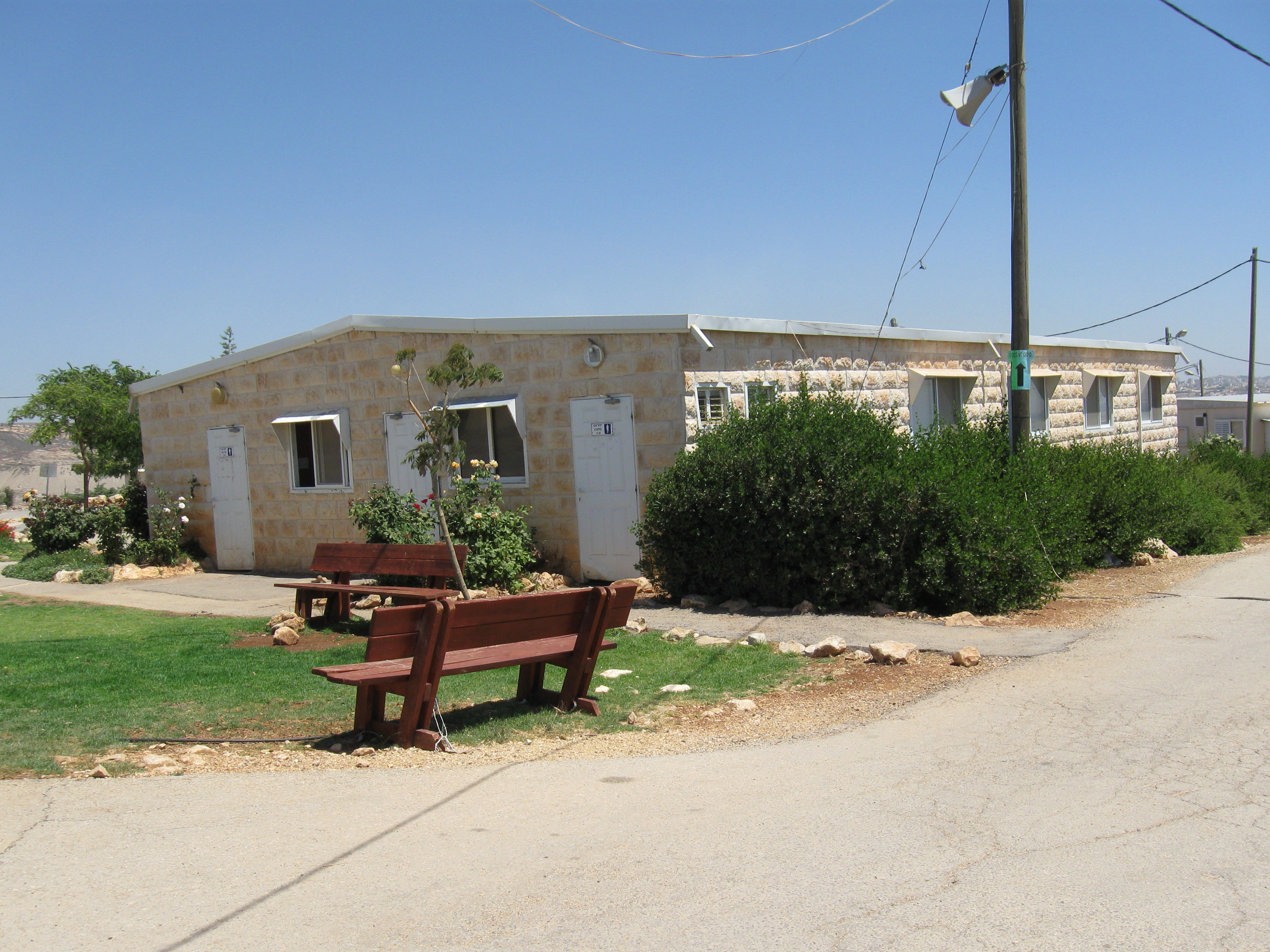

- Location within the Central West Bank
- Coordinates: 31°53′23″N 35°16′17″E
- Country: Israel
- District: Judea and Samaria Area
- Council: Mateh Binyamin
- Region: West Bank
- Founded: 1999 (re-founded in 2001), legalized 2025
- Population (2011): 260

Migron (Hebrew: מגרון) is an Israeli settlement in the West Bank, located within 2 km of a former outpost by the same name, that was relocated to its present site on 2 September 2012. The outpost was located 14 kilometers north of Jerusalem, it fell under the jurisdiction of the Mateh Binyamin Regional Council. It was the largest outpost of its kind, with a population of 300. The council says it was founded in 1999 and re-founded in 2001, on land registered before 1967 by the villagers of Burqa. The Israeli government contributed NIS 4.3 million from the Construction and Housing Ministry to build Migron.

Responding to a petition filed in 2006 by Peace Now, Israel's High Court of Justice ruled on 2 August 2011 that Migron was illegally built on lands belonging to Palestinians and ordered Israel to dismantle the outpost by April 2012. The Israeli government decided not to obey the court order, and instead pursued an agreement with the settlers that gave them time to delay the move until 30 November 2015. However, on 25 March 2012 the High Court reaffirmed its earlier ruling, noting the government had admitted it was built on privately owned Palestinian land, and ordered the IDF to evacuate Migron by 1 August 2012, while making clear that this court ruling is an obligation, not a choice. On 2 September 2012 the evacuation of Migron was complete, after the residents had agreed to relocate to a new site a few hundred meters south of the former location. The site, built by the government in great haste, consists of 50 prefabricated housing units built on state land, and has a status of a government-approved settlement. It was officially legalized in 2025.

The international community considers Israeli settlements in the West Bank illegal under international law, but the Israeli government disputes this.

== Geography ==
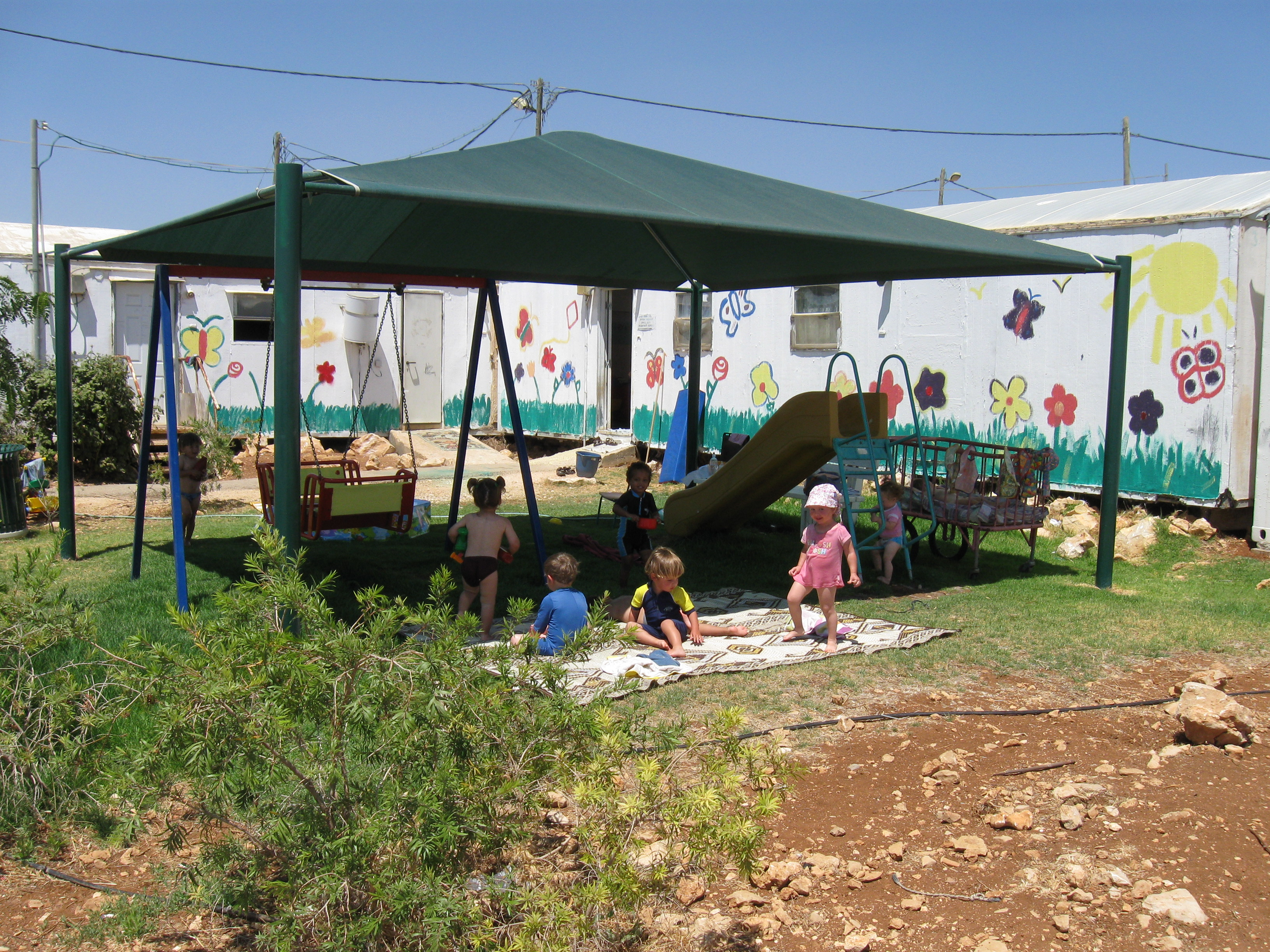
Migron nursery school

Migron is located 14 kilometers north of Jerusalem in the northern Binyamin, 7.7 km east of the Green line, outside of the Separation Barrier. It falls under the jurisdiction of the Mateh Binyamin Regional Council. It is situated on a hillside next to Highway 60, the main road that connects the northern West Bank with the southern areas, near the settlement Kokhav Ya'akov and the Shaar Binyamin Industrial Park.

== Etymology ==
Migron is named after the village Migron mentioned in the Hebrew Bible in Isaiah 10:28 as a village somewhere on the route between Ai and Mikhmas along which the Assyrian army advanced.

== History ==
According to the Mateh Binyamin Regional Council, Migron was founded in 1999 and re-established in 2001. It was the largest unauthorized settlement in the West Bank, with a population of 300 living in 60 mobile homes. According to the Sasson Report based on testimony from the IDF Brigade Commander, Migron was established in April 2002, a few days before Operation Defensive Shield. A request for a cellular radio tower on the hilltop was granted by Israel Defense Forces although ownership of the land was then still in dispute. Some time later, caravans were placed near the radio tower without authorization, leading to a confrontation between settlers and the IDF. The infrastructure for Migron was financed by the Housing Ministry, headed by Yair Rafaeli, who urged his staff to provide the illegal outpost with massive government support. According to the Sasson Report, government subsidies amounted to four million NIS, despite the lack of statutory planning or a cabinet decision approving the construction. Following the publication of the Sasson report in March 2005, Israeli police investigated the procedure that led to Migron's establishment, with Rafaeli reportedly being the prime suspect in the case. The case was passed to the State Prosecutor's Office in 2007 where, according to Haaretz, "it gathered dust for several years". State Prosecutor Moshe Lador closed the case in January 2012 "due to lack of evidence against some of the suspects, and due to lack of public interest regarding others". In response, Peace Now said "Criminal offenses that were committed in broad daylight were not investigated seriously".

=== Juridical actions ===
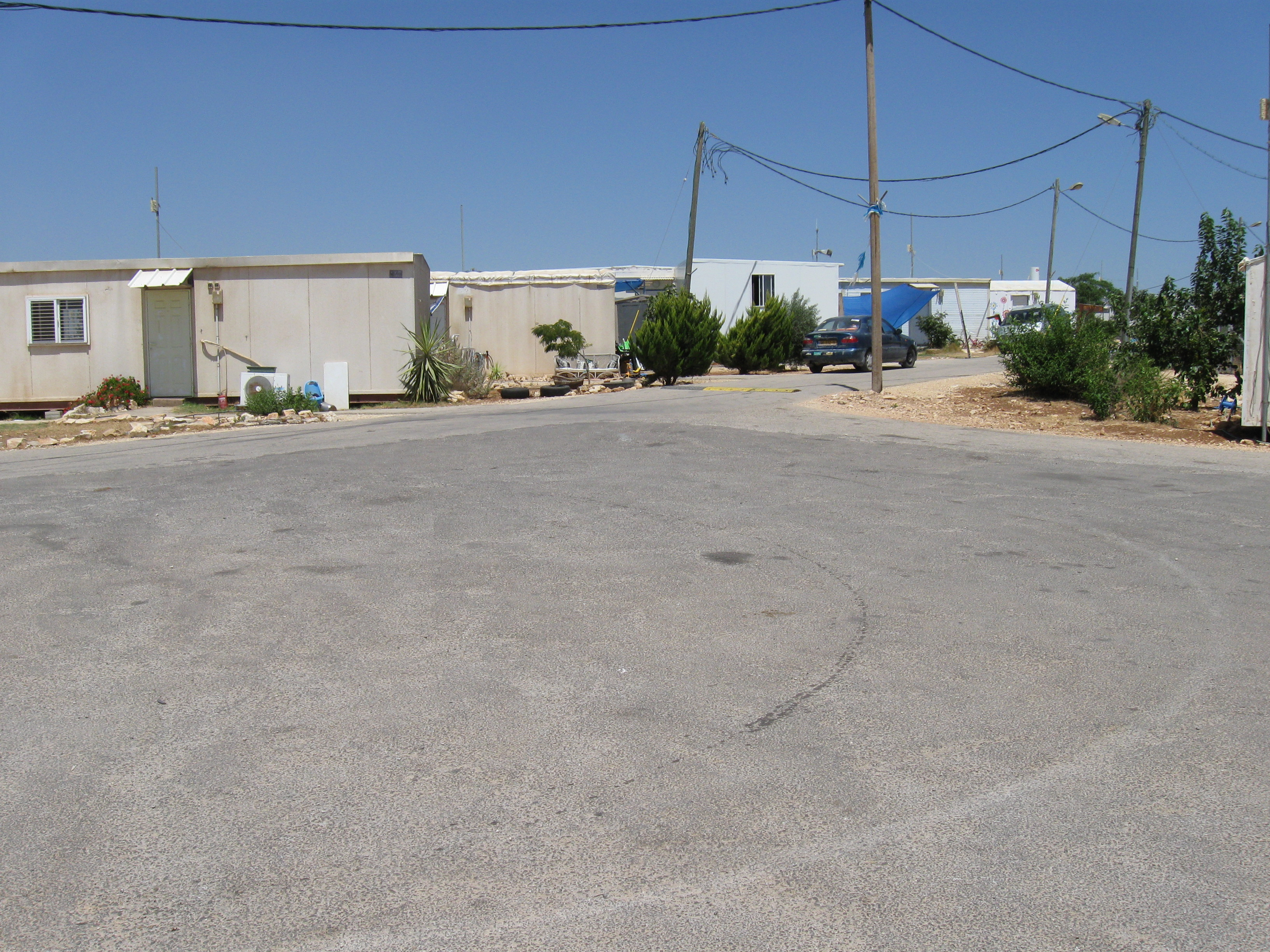
Migron caravans, 2008

==== Land ownership ====
According to the Israeli government, Israel's Supreme Court, and the Israeli organisation Peace Now, the land Migron sits on is owned by a number of Palestinian families living in the nearby villages of Burqa and Deir Dibwan. In July 2008, additional questions were raised as to the ownership of some of the land that Migron stands on. Apparently, land was purchased with forged documents. According to a news report, Abd Allatif Hassan Sumarin, who supposedly sold a plot of land to Binyamin Regional Council owned by al-Watan Ltd in 2004, had been dead since 1961. These suspicions were later confirmed by an Associated Press investigation.

At the end of 2008, after the state had failed to evacuate Migron as it had undertaken to do in a petition to the High Court of Justice, some of the land owners filed a claim for damages for the loss of income from their land, hoping to pressure the state to evacuate Migron. After the HCJ verdict ordering Migron's evacuation, this lawsuit was withdrawn, allegedly in order to save costs and time and to prevent any forestalling with regard to the evacuation.

In January 2012, the Jerusalem Magistrate's Court accepted the request that the suit for damages be revoked. The petitioners were ordered to compensate the settlers and the State for court costs. Settlers then attempted to use the withdrawal as an argument for claiming that the Palestinians had failed to provide evidence of their ownership of the land, an argument the court rejected.

According to Arutz Sheva, by 26 February 2012, not all claims of ownership of the land of Migron have been settled. The state of Israel said that "(..) there will be no civilian presence at the present site of Migron until the claims of ownership of the land are all settled. In addition, it insists that all buildings at the site be razed and says that only if it turns out that the land has no private owner can they be rebuilt." The proposed new settlement will be near the Psagot Winery about two kilometers away from Migron, and defined as part of the existing settlement of Kochav Yaakov, though it does not abut it, and has no road connection to it. According to Nehemia Shtrasler, the agreement worked out with Benny Begin, while stating that the Migron settlers trespassed illegally on Palestinian land, allows them to evade punishment, and receive an expensive government gift in the form of a new settlement to be built for them. He concluded:

"That is to say, the state will compensate offenders who appropriated private lands and established a settlement illegally. That's how crime, punishment and rewards are dealt with by Benny Begin."

==== Evacuation orders ====
Ariel Sharon announced that Migron would be dismantled in 2003. On 17 December 2006, the Israeli government, responding to a petition from Peace Now and residents of Burqa and Deir Dibwan, conceded that the establishment of Migron had not received official authorization. On 12 February 2007, the Israeli High Court of Justice ordered the government to submit a report within 60 days on steps that would be taken to remove the outpost. On 1 May 2007, the government told the court that Prime Minister Ehud Olmert had instructed the Defence Ministry to prepare an evacuation plan within the next two months. A 60-day extension was requested. On 8 July 2007, the government requested a further 90-day extension so that the new Minister of Defence, Ehud Barak, could formulate his position on the issue.

On 23 January 2008, the government informed the court that "The Prime Minister and Defense Minister have decided that the outpost Migron, which was constructed on Private Palestinian land, will be evacuated within six months, that is until the beginning of August 2008". In addition the statement also expresses that the Defense Ministry reserves the right to "request from the Supreme Court an extension on this date, if it deems necessary". The promise was accepted by the Supreme Court on 6 February 2008. On 13 August 2008, the government declared that the Yesha Council had agreed to decide within 30 days to which location to transfer the outpost, on 24 November 2008 the government signed an agreement with the settlers to remove the outpost to the settlement of Geva Binyamin. On 26 November, the Supreme Court ordered the government to explain within 45 days why it didn't remove the outpost.

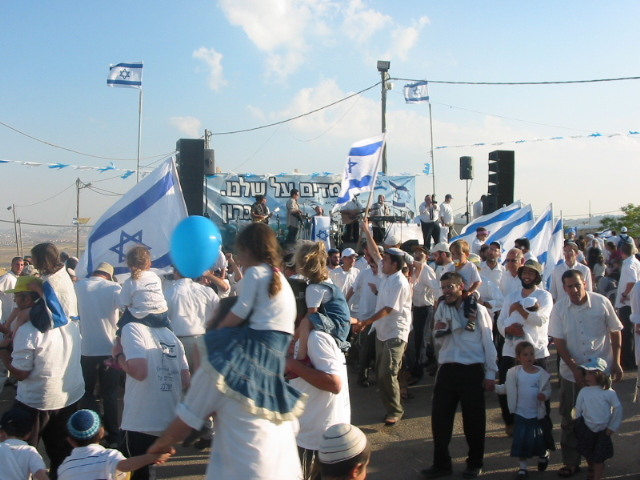
2008 Israeli Independence Day celebration at Migron

In her summation Supreme Court President Dorit Beinisch criticized the State "Today you are submitting papers full of promises, but without any knowledge of who will actually see this through in 3 years time, your statements have turned into meaningless words. In your statements you have revealed some of your secrets: you explain how the evacuation will be carried out, but you never actually say that it will be carried out". On 2 February 2009 the government responded with the declaration that they intend to construct a new neighbourhood in an existing settlement for the evacuees of the Migron outpost. On 28 June 2009, the government submitted an affidavit to the courts, according to which the Ministry of Defense authorized the construction of a new neighborhood in the existing settlements of Geva Binyamin. The construction would include 50 housing units for the evacuees of Migron and another 1,450 units for new settlers.

==== Supreme Court ruling ====
On 2 August 2011, in response to a petition filed by Peace Now along with Palestinians, Israel's Supreme Court issued a ruling ordering the state to dismantle the outpost by April 2012. Supreme Court president Dorit Beinisch wrote: "There is no doubt that according to the law a settlement cannot be built on land privately owned by Palestinians". It is the first time the Supreme Court has ordered the state to dismantle an outpost in the West Bank. The ruling was denounced by several Members of the Knesset, including Tzipi Hotovely (Likud), who called it "hypocritical", and Moshe Feiglin (Likud), who accused the Supreme Court of denying Jewish land rights. The Yesha Council accused the court of applying a double standard and of needlessly inflaming tensions. The Israeli newspaper Haaretz called the ruling "one of the most serious indictments ever filed against Israel's political establishment, legal system and security apparatus".

The Israeli government decided not to obey the court order, and instead pursued an agreement with the settlers that gave them time to delay the move until 30 November 2015. However, on 25 March 2012 the High Court reaffirmed its earlier ruling and ordered the IDF to evacuate Migron by 1 August 2012, while making clear that this court ruling is an obligation, not a choice. Knesset Speaker Reuven Rivlin (Likud) held out the possibility of legislation which would nullify the court's decision.

On 3 July 2012, the settlers filed another appeal in an attempt to prevent the demolition of Migron. This time, they claimed that the land was recently bought from the Palestinian owner. The owner, however, had died a year earlier. The development firm al-Watan again tried to register the land, citing an apparent false purchase, and appealed to the Jerusalem District Court. In August 2012 the High Court denied the settlers' petition and ordered Migron evacuated by 11 September 2012. Aryeh Eldad, pro-settlement Knesset member, said that he "hoped ultra-nationalists flocked to the outpost to protect it." By 2 September 2012 all of the 47 families in Migron had been evacuated.

==== Yesh Din petition ====
In early September 2011, a force of approximately one thousand police officers destroyed three illegal permanent structures in Migron, arresting six youths among the 200 protesting settlers. The three buildings were ordered to be destroyed by the Supreme Court, following a petition issued by the Israeli human rights group Yesh Din. Shortly after the demolition, Al-Nurayn Mosque, a mosque in the West Bank village of Qusra, south of Nablus, was set on fire, according to Palestinian sources by Israeli settlers. Elyakim Levanon, Regional Rabbi of the Samaria Regional Council declared in August 2012 that "Whoever raises a hand on Migron – his hand will be cut off."

=== Legalization ===
On March 22, 2025, the Israeli government legalized Migron.
