= Burqa, Ramallah =

Burqa
- Municipality type C

Arabic transcription(s)
  - Arabic: بُرقة
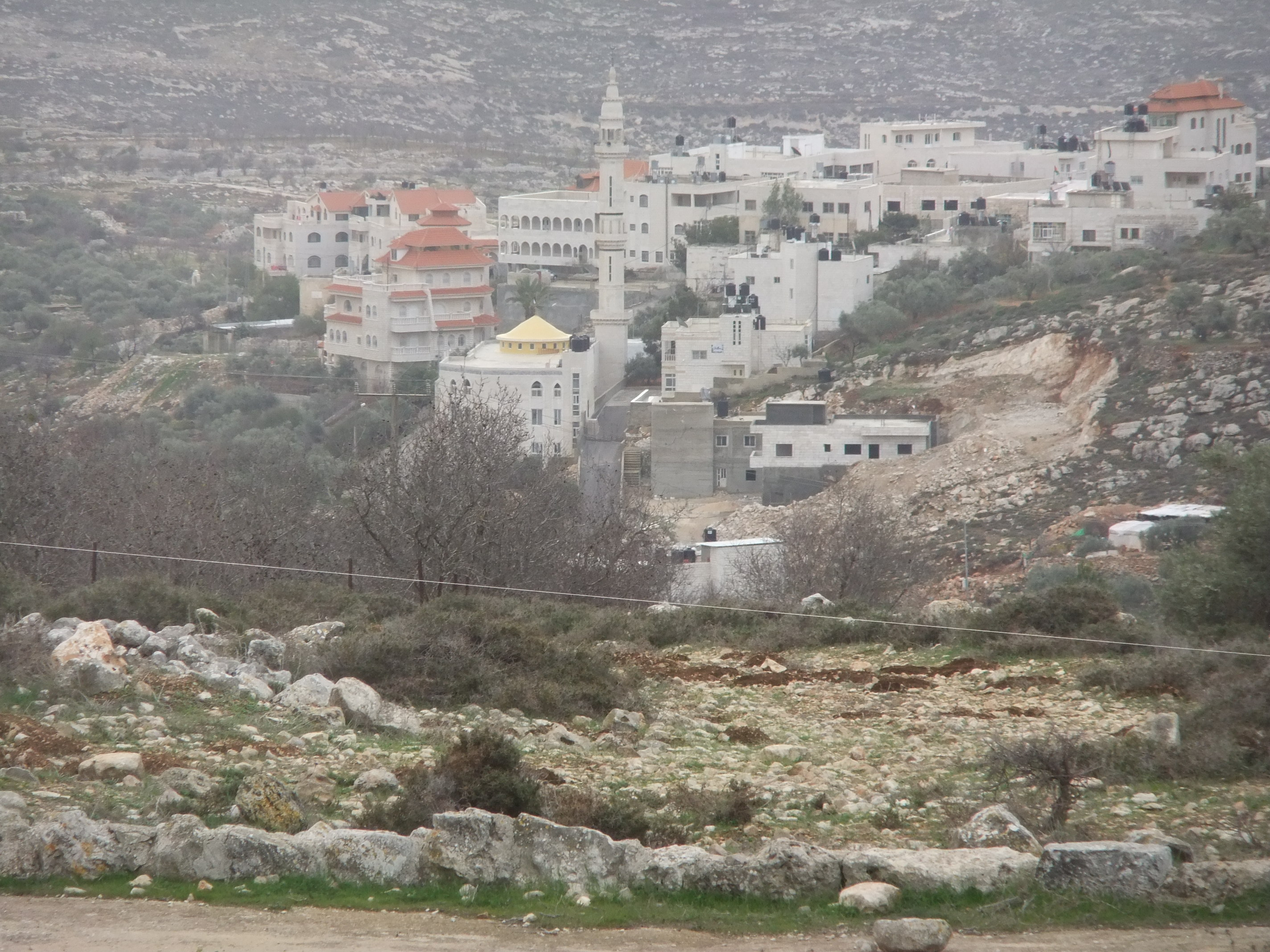
- Burqa´s mosque from the north

- Location of Burqa within Palestine
- Coordinates: 31°53′45″N 35°15′15″E
- Palestine grid: 174/144
- Country: Palestine
- Governorate: Ramallah and al-Bireh

Government
  - Type: Municipality
- Elevation: 738 m (2,421 ft)

Population (2017)
  - Total: 2,047
- Name meaning: "The speckled ground"

Burqa (Arabic: بُرقة) is a town in the Ramallah and al-Bireh Governorate, located east of Ramallah in the northern West Bank, Palestine. According to the Palestinian Central Bureau of Statistics (PCBS), the town had a population of 2,047 inhabitants in the 2017 census.

== Location ==
Burqa is located 5 kilometers (3.1 mi) (horizontally) east of Ramallah. It is bordered by Deir Dibwan to the east and north, Beitin to the north, Al-Bireh to the west, and Mukhmas and Kafr 'Aqab to the south.

== History ==
In 1596, Burqa appeared in Ottoman tax registers as being in the Nahiya of Quds of the Liwa of Quds. It had a population of 28 Muslim households. The villagers paid a fixed tax rate of 33,3% on various agricultural products, including wheat, barley, olives, fruit trees, goats and/or beehives; a total of 4,940 akçe.

In 1838 Edward Robinson noted it as a Muslim village, Burka, located in the area immediately north of Jerusalem, seeing it "high up on the hill-side".

In 1863 Victor Guérin found it to contain about thirty houses. A Muslim shrine devoted to Sheikh Youseph was also noted.

An Ottoman village list from about 1870 showed that Burka had a population of 152, with a total of 31 houses, though the population count included men, only. In 1883, the PEF's Survey of Western Palestine described Burkah as "a good-sized village standing high on a bare hillside, with a spring in the valley to the south."

In 1896 the population of Burka was estimated to be about 270 people.

=== British Mandate of Palestine ===
In the 1922 census of Palestine, conducted by the British Mandate authorities, Burqa had a population of 268, all Muslims, increasing in the 1931 census, to 320, still all Muslim, in 66 houses.

In the 1945 statistics, the population was 380, all Muslims, while the total land area was 6,001 dunams, according to an official land and population survey. Of this, 1,297 dunams were allocated for plantations and irrigable land, 2,460 for cereals, while 22 dunams were classified as built-up areas.

=== Jordanian era ===
In the wake of the 1948 Arab–Israeli War, and after the 1949 Armistice Agreements, Burqa came under Jordanian rule.

The Jordanian census of 1961 found 582 inhabitants.

=== 1967 and aftermath ===
Since the Six-Day War in 1967, Burqa has been under Israeli occupation.

After the 1995 accords, 8.5% of the village land was defined as Area B land, while the remaining 91.5% was defined as Area C. Israel has confiscated land from Burqa for the construction of the Israeli settlement of Kokhav Ya'akov.

The outpost Migron, Mateh Binyamin was located east of Burqa, on land registered as privately owned by inhabitants of Burqa and Deir Dibwan. In 2012 Migron was evacuated and since then the area is deserted.

The village often experiences harassment from settlers that includes armed invasions of the village and attacks on residents,burning cars and houses and destruction of crops and livestock. In August 2023, a resident of the village was killed by a settler who entered with a herd a private field belonging to the local resident.

Arson of fields by settlers in Burqa, June 2024

== Bibliography ==
- Barron, J.B., ed. (1923). Palestine: Report and General Abstracts of the Census of 1922. Government of Palestine.
- Conder, C.R.; Kitchener, H.H. (1883). The Survey of Western Palestine: Memoirs of the Topography, Orography, Hydrography, and Archaeology. Vol. 3. London: Committee of the Palestine Exploration Fund.
- Government of Jordan, Department of Statistics (1964). First Census of Population and Housing. Volume I: Final Tables; General Characteristics of the Population (PDF).
- Government of Palestine, Department of Statistics (1945). Village Statistics, April, 1945.
- Guérin, V. (1869). Description Géographique Historique et Archéologique de la Palestine (in French). Vol. 1: Judee, pt. 3. Paris: L'Imprimerie Nationale.
- Hadawi, S. (1970). Village Statistics of 1945: A Classification of Land and Area ownership in Palestine. Palestine Liberation Organization Research Center.
- Hartmann, M. (1883). "Die Ortschaftenliste des Liwa Jerusalem in dem türkischen Staatskalender für Syrien auf das Jahr 1288 der Flucht (1871)". Zeitschrift des Deutschen Palästina-Vereins. 6: 102–149.
- Hütteroth, W.-D.; Abdulfattah, K. (1977). Historical Geography of Palestine, Transjordan and Southern Syria in the Late 16th Century. Erlanger Geographische Arbeiten, Sonderband 5. Erlangen, Germany: Vorstand der Fränkischen Geographischen Gesellschaft. ISBN 3-920405-41-2.
- Mills, E., ed. (1932). Census of Palestine 1931. Population of Villages, Towns and Administrative Areas. Jerusalem: Government of Palestine.
- Palmer, E.H. (1881). The Survey of Western Palestine: Arabic and English Name Lists Collected During the Survey by Lieutenants Conder and Kitchener, R. E. Transliterated and Explained by E.H. Palmer. Committee of the Palestine Exploration Fund.
- Robinson, E.; Smith, E. (1841). Biblical Researches in Palestine, Mount Sinai and Arabia Petraea: A Journal of Travels in the year 1838. Vol. 2. Boston: Crocker & Brewster.
- Robinson, E.; Smith, E. (1841). Biblical Researches in Palestine, Mount Sinai and Arabia Petraea: A Journal of Travels in the year 1838. Vol. 3. Boston: Crocker & Brewster.
- Schick, C. (1896). "Zur Einwohnerzahl des Bezirks Jerusalem". Zeitschrift des Deutschen Palästina-Vereins. 19: 120–127.
- Socin, A. (1879). "Alphabetisches Verzeichniss von Ortschaften des Paschalik Jerusalem". Zeitschrift des Deutschen Palästina-Vereins. 2: 135–163.
