= Keter Torah =

Keter Torah (also spelled Keser Torah or Kesser Torah) (Hebrew: כתר תורה, lit., "Crown of Torah") may refer to:

- Keser Torah Radomsk – a yeshiva network founded by the fourth Radomsker Rebbe
- Kesser Torah College – a Jewish day school in Sydney, Australia
- Yeshiva Kesser Torah – a yeshiva and synagogue in Queens, New York
- Keter Torah – a commentary on the Torah by Aaron ben Elijah
- Keter Torah – a poem by Isaachar Bär ben Judah Carmoly
