= Rimmon =

Ancient Syrian cult image and temple

Rimmon or Rimon (Hebrew: רִמּוֹן, romanized: Rīmmōn) is a Hebrew word meaning 'pomegranate'. It appears as a name in the Hebrew Bible where, when translated to Greek, it takes the form Remmon Ρεμμων, Remmōn).

Rimmon ("pomegranate" in Hebrew) was a Syrian deity mentioned in the Second Book of Kings (2 Kings 5:18), to whom a temple was dedicated. In Syria, this storm god was also known as Hadad (interpreted to mean "the breast" in Biblical Hebrew) or Baal ("the Lord"), and in Assyria as Ramanu ("the thunderer", when borrowed from Akkadian - cf. Akkadian ramanu, "to roar").

== Hebrew Bible ==
=== Place-names ===
Rimmon may refer to:

- Rimmon, one of the "uttermost cities" of Judah, afterwards given to Simeon (Joshua 15:21, 32; 19:7; 1 Chronicles 4:32). In Joshua 15:32, Ain and Rimmon are mentioned separately, but in Joshua 19:7 and 1 Chronicles 4:32 the two words are probably to be combined, as forming together the name of one place, Ain-Rimmon = "the spring of the pomegranate" (compare Nehemiah 11:29). It has been identified with Um er-Rumamin, or Horvat Rimmon, about 13 miles south-west of Hebron. Zechariah 14:10 describes it as "south of Jerusalem," to distinguish it from other Rimmons; and uses it in conjunction with Geba to describe the latitudinal span of the kingdom of Judah.
- The Rock of Rimmon, where the Benjamites fled (Judges 20:45, 47; 21:13), and where they maintained themselves for four months after the battle at Gibeah. It is the present village of Rammun, "on the very edge of the hill country, with a precipitous descent toward the Jordan valley", supposed to be the site of Ai. Israeli settlement Rimonim nearby is named after the biblical place.
- Hadad-Rimmon near Megiddo

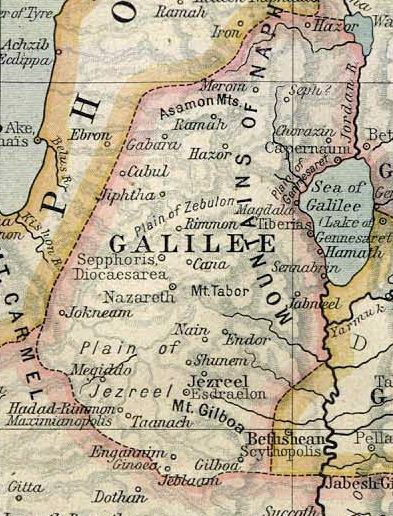
A map showing Hadad-Rimmon in ancient Galilee (bottom left) and identifying it with Maximianopolis

=== Biblical figure ===
Rimon is mentioned as a man of Beeroth of the tribe of Benjamin, whose two sons, Baanah and Rechab, were captains of the army of Ish-bosheth, son of King Saul.

=== Syrian deity ===
Rimmon ("pomegranate" in Hebrew) was a Syrian deity mentioned in the Second Book of Kings (2 Kings 5:18), to whom a temple was dedicated. In Syria, this storm god was also known as Hadad (interpreted to mean "the breast" in Biblical Hebrew) or Baal ("the Lord"), and in Assyria as Ramanu ("the thunderer", when borrowed from Akkadian - cf. Akkadian ramanu, "to roar").

According to the biblical narrative, the Aramean commander Naaman, having been healed of his leprosy by the Israelite prophet Elisha, requested pardon from God for continuing to minister to the King of Syria who would continue to worship in the Temple of Rimmon. Elisha granted him this pardon.

== Extra-biblical usage ==
- An adornment of the Torah scroll (usually plural: Torah rimonim), from the Hebrew word for pomegranate.

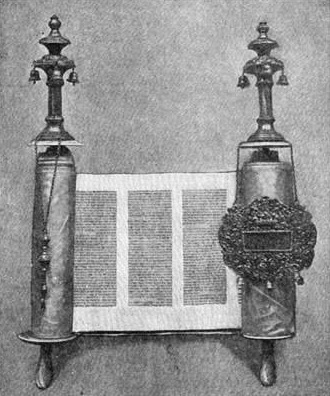
Torah with rimmonim

- "Rimmon", a poem by Rudyard Kipling written in 1903 after the Boer War.
- According to The Urantia Book, allegedly revealed by celestial beings and published in 1955 in the US, Rimmon was a small city in the region of Galilee which "had once been dedicated to the worship of a Babylonian god of the air, Ramman" (see Hadad/Ramman).

== See also ==
- Rimon (disambiguation)
