= 2017 Temple Mount shooting =

Terrorist attack in Jerusalem on 14 July 2017

- Part of the 2017 Temple Mount crisis and Israeli–Palestinian conflict
- Map of the Old City of Jerusalem
- Location: 31°46′51″N 35°14′13″E; Jerusalem
- Date: 14 July 2017 c. 7:00 (UTC+3)
- Target: Israeli Border Police
- Attack type: Mass shooting
- Weapons: 2 submachine guns, 1 handgun
- Deaths: 2 police officers (+3 attackers)
- Injuries: 2
- No. of participants: 3 Arab-Israelis affiliated with the Islamic Movement in Israel

On 14 July 2017, three Arab-Israeli men left the Temple Mount (also known as the Noble Sanctuary), and opened fire on Israeli border police officers stationed near the Gate of the Tribes which is close to the Lions' Gate. Two Israeli border police officers were killed and two more were injured in the attack. All three attackers were shot and killed by Israeli police after fleeing back into the complex.

== Background ==
Prior to the shooting, there had been three attacks in Jerusalem in 2017:

- A January 8 truck attack that killed four Israeli soldiers and injured 17
- An April 14 stabbing on the Jerusalem Light Rail that killed 1 and injured 2
- A June 16 attack targeting Israeli police that killed one female officer and injured four

== Attack ==
Shortly after 07:00 in the morning on 14 July 2017, three gunmen armed with improvised "carlo" submachine guns and a handgun, ran out of the Temple Mount via the Gate of the Tribes (near the Lions' Gate) and shot at Israeli Border Police officers stationed in the street outside. The three attackers fled back to the square in front of one of the mosques on the Temple Mount and were shot by Israeli police officers. After being shot, one of the attackers who was believed to be dead, rose up from the ground and attempted to attack police officers but was shot before he could, shouting as he got up "I'm from Raed Salah's group". Two Israeli border police officers were critically wounded and died later, and another two were moderately wounded in the attack.

=== Attackers ===
The three attackers were Arab Israeli citizens from the city of Umm al-Fahm. They were identified as Mohammed Ahmed Mafdal Jabrin and Mohammed Hamed Abed Eltif Jabrin, both of whom were 19 years old, as well as 29 year old Mohammed Ahmed Mohammed Jabrin who worked as a Muezzin in a local mosque. Two of the attackers posted pictures of themselves smiling in front of the al-Aqsa mosque on Facebook three hours before the attack with the caption "tomorrow's smile will be wider" and "praise to Allah, and enough". The attackers hid the weapons used for the attack in the square at the Temple Mount a few days prior to the attack, with the assistance of a member of the Waqf.

The perpetrators and the mosque they prayed in were identified by Israeli authorities as belonging to the northern branch of the Islamic Movement in Israel.

=== Victims ===
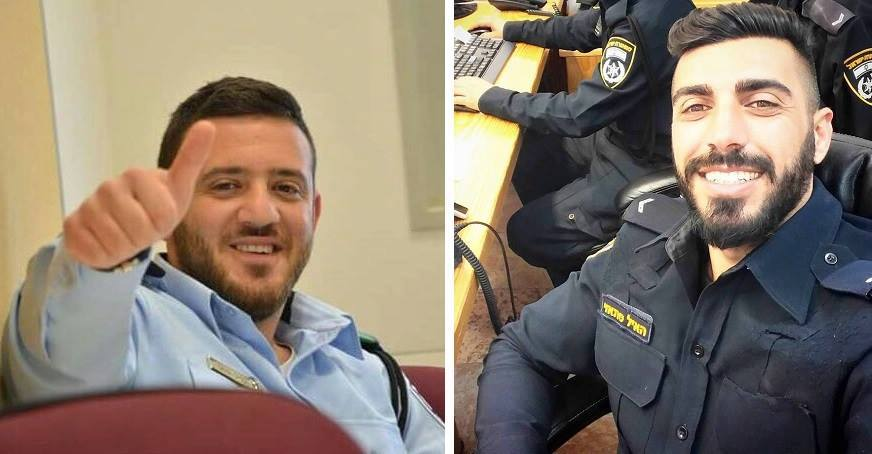
Haiel Sitawe (left) and Kamil Shnaan

The two border police officers who died in the attack were identified as Haiel Sitawe and Kamil Shnaan. Both of them were Israeli Druze and hailed from the Northern Galilee region. Sitawe, 30 years old, lived in the village of Maghar, and Shnaan, 22 years old, lived in the village of Hurfeish. Sitawe had joined the Border Police as part of his mandatory national service in 2012 and had served at Temple Mount since then. Shnaan joined it after high school and signed on as a career officer seven months before the attack. He was the youngest son of Israeli Labor Party's former Knesset member Shachiv Shnaan.

== Aftermath ==
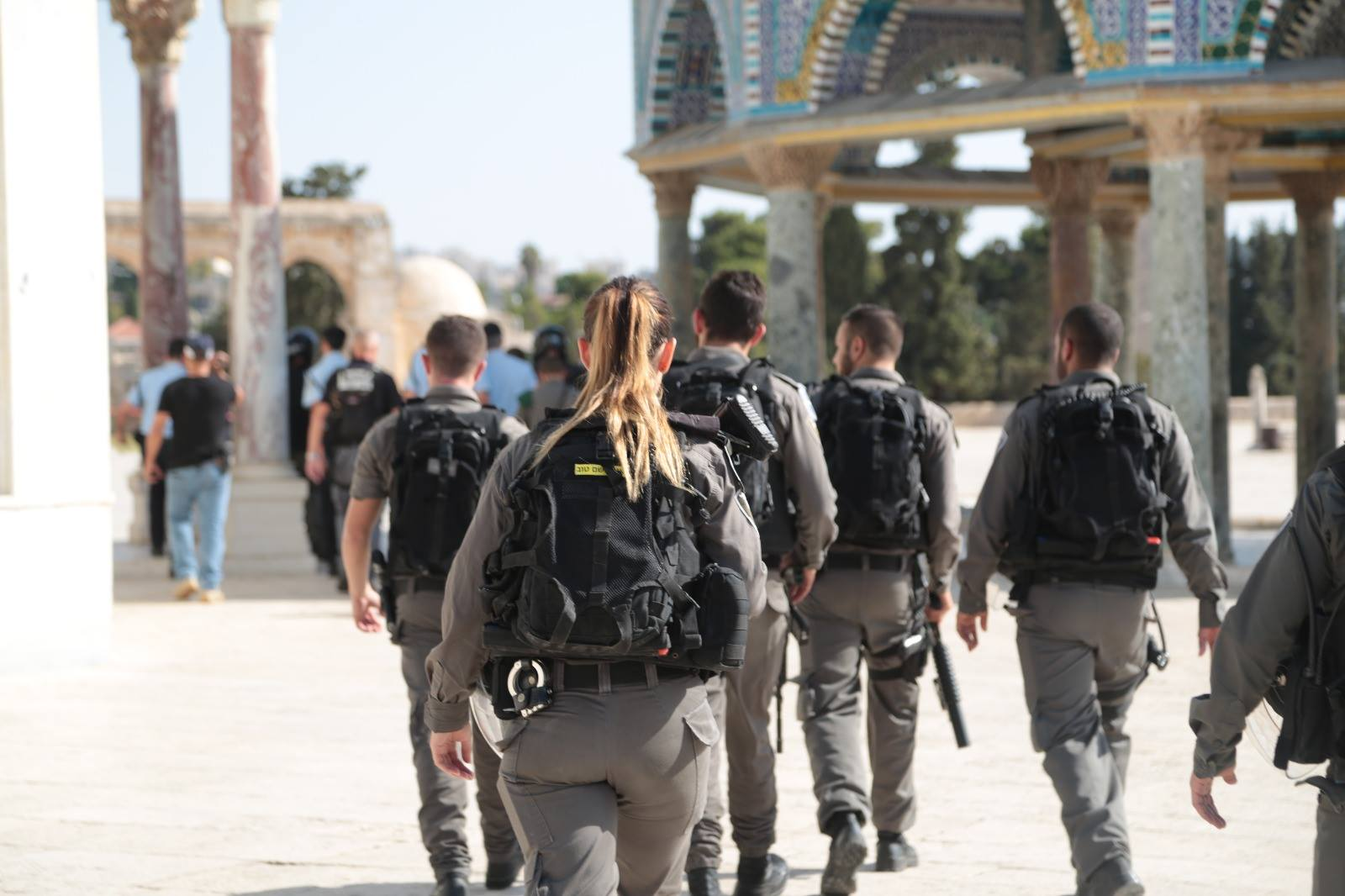
Israeli police officers at the Mount after the attack

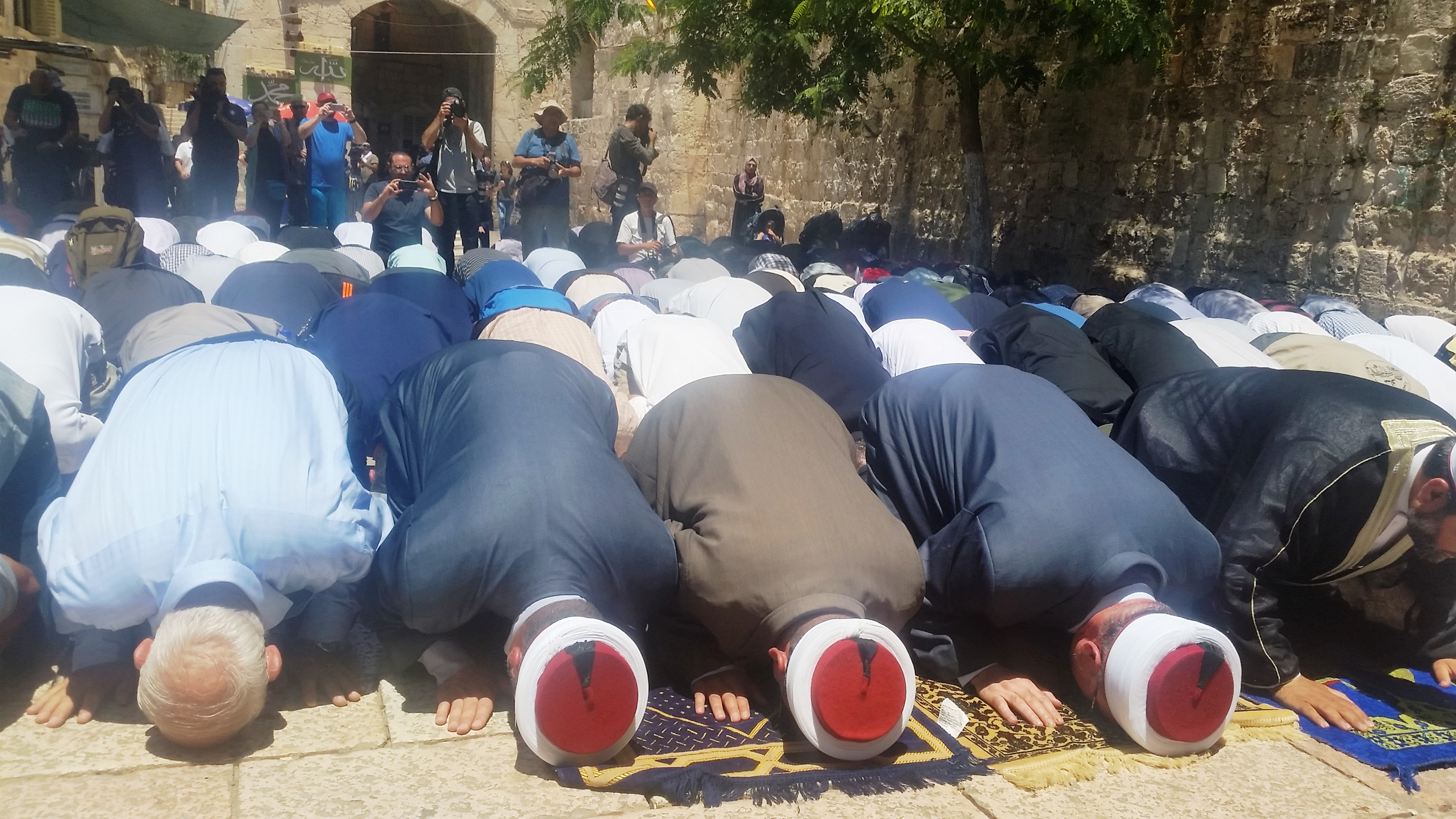
Muslims praying at the entrance to the Temple Mount at the Tribal Gate, July 16, 2017

=== Jerusalem ===
Israeli authorities shut down the Temple Mount complex, and for the first time in years, Friday prayers at the al-Aqsa mosque were canceled. The Old City was also closed to traffic. The al-Aqsa mosque was raided by Israeli authorities and Jerusalem Islamic Waqf personnel were questioned. The Israeli police said they found additional weapons in the raid, including mock guns, knives, clubs, chains, and other weapons. Muhammad Ahmad Hussein, the Grand Mufti of Jerusalem, called on Muslims to march to al-Aqsa and hold Friday prayers wherever they are stopped. The Grand Mufti was detained by Israeli security officers following his call for Muslims to defy the closure.

On the 16 July, Israeli authorities reopened the Temple Mount, after placing metal detectors at the entrances to the compound, under protest from the site's Waqf authorities. A crisis spiraled leading to a weeklong stand-off, during which Israeli security agencies such as Shin Bet recommended their removal. The Waqf called on Muslims to protest outside of the compound instead of entering, with around 200 Muslims protesting outside on the 16th. Israeli authorities also announced the installation of security cameras outside the compound. Although the compound was reopened for Muslim access, Israeli police prevented Jews from entering the Temple Mount complex under directions from Prime Minister Netanyahu. Clashes erupted outside the Temple Mount later that day after a group of Palestinians attempted to enter with a casket containing a body. Jews were allowed in on the morning of the 17 July. Further clashes occurred on the night of the 17th, and Fatah called on the 18th for a "day of rage" in protest of the new security arrangements.

Palestinians protesting against new security measures had clashed with Israeli security forces outside the gates to the al-Aqsa compound for several days and on Friday, 21 July 2017. Three Palestinians were killed, one of them a 17-year old from Silwan. Details regarding his death vary; the Ma'an news agency reports that he was shot by a settler, a report not confirmed by other sources, which confirm only that he was killed in Ras al-Amud. On the same day, Palestinian President Mahmoud Abbas ordered the suspension of all official contact with Israel until it removed the new security measures.

=== Umm al-Fahm ===
Several hours after the attack, a wake and symbolic funeral with hundreds of attendees was held for the attackers in the Al-Porkan mosque in Umm al-Fahm, which is affiliated with the Islamic Movement in Israel and in which the attackers prayed, in which the attackers were praised and called Shahids.

Following a ruling by the supreme court on the 25 of July, the attackers' bodies were released to their families on the night of the 26th of July. In a show of support for the attackers, some 10,000 people marched in the funeral processing in Umm al-Fahm, praising the attack and calling the attackers heroes and shahids.

Raed Salah was arrested and charged for his alleged incitement for terror.

Three residents of Umm al-Fahm were indicted in September 2017 for allegedly planning a copy cat attack on the Temple Mount, after they had allegedly failed to join the Islamic State of Iraq and the Levant.

=== Maghar ===
Maghar is a mixed Druze-Christian-Muslim town. Following a Facebook post supporting the terror attack by a Muslim resident of Maghar, the hometown of one of the victims, two mosques in the village were attacked in two separate incidents on the nights of 14 and 16 July with stun grenades and gunfire resulting in minor property damage. Israeli police were on the scene of the attacks within minutes, where they gathered evidence and opened an investigation.

=== Related terror attacks ===
In the evening of 21 July, 3 Israelis were murdered and one severely wounded when a 19-year old Palestinian youth, Omar al-Abed, from the village of Kobar, penetrated a home in the Israeli settlement of Halamish/Neve Tzuf and carried out an assault by stabbing members of the family. Shortly before, al-Abed had written on Facebook that he was upset by the murdering of Palestinian women and children, and the desecration of the al-Aqsa Mosque.

On the afternoon of July 23, Mohammed Zakaria al-Jawawdeh a 17-year-old Palestinian from Amman, stabbed an Israeli embassy guard in the stomach with a screwdriver. The guard shot al-Jawawdeh in self-defence. A stray bullet accidentally injured the Jordanian building owner, he later succumbed to his wounds. Jordanian authorities had prevented the guard's departure from Amman but eventually allowed him to return which led to speculation that there had been an agreement between the Jordanian and Israeli governments that in exchange for the guard's return, the metal detectors at the al-Aqsa compound would be removed.

On Monday morning, 24 July, a Palestinian man from Qalqiliya stabbed a 32 year old Arab Israeli in Petah Tikva. A worker at a nearby pizza restaurant struck the attacker with a pizza tray. He was later arrested and said he did it for al-Aqsa, in reference to the new security measures.

== Reactions ==
Regional

- Israel - Prime Minister Benjamin Netanyahu said it was "a sad day in which our Druze brothers pay the heaviest price in our joint mission to protect the security of our country. I salute them and their heroism." Defense Minister Avigdor Lieberman said: "The State of Israel will continue to fight resolutely, forcefully and uncompromisingly against the terrorists, their dispatchers, and those who incite them. I applaud our security forces in their courageous daily struggle against terrorism and mourn the death of the officers who fell in the attack."
- Jordan - The spokesman for the Jordanian government condemned Israel's closure of the Temple Mount and the al-Aqsa mosque and called on them to reopen it immediately. Subsequently, following criticism from Israel for not doing so, King Abdullah II condemned the attack, called for calm, and reopening of the Temple Mount. On July 16 the Parliament of Jordan criticized the Temple Mount closure and held a prayer service in honor of the attackers. Atef Tarawneh, the Speaker of the Jordanian Parliament praised the attackers, calling them "martyrs who were defending Palestinians", while also blaming "Israeli occupation" as the reason for the attack.
- Palestine - President Mahmoud Abbas condemned the attack in a call with Prime Minister of Israel and issued condolences.
- Hamas - Sami Abu Zouhri, a senior spokesman for Hamas, praised the attack and Hamas state television called it a "heroic act".
- Islamic Jihad - The Islamic Jihad called the attack 'heroic' in an emailed statement to press.
- United States - The White House issued a statement following the attack saying “The people of the United States strongly condemn the terror attack,” as well as supporting the Israeli decision to temporarily close the Temple Mount.

=== Media coverage ===
According to Ynet, the breaking news report from Al-Jazeera reported only on the shooting of the attackers and not the incident itself. Donald Trump Jr. criticized BBC on Twitter for the way they headlined the attack.

== See also ==
- 2017 Halamish stabbing attack
- June 2017 Jerusalem attack
- List of terrorist incidents in July 2017
- List of violent incidents in the Israeli–Palestinian conflict, July–December 2017
