= 2017 Halamish stabbing attack =

Terrorist incident in West Bank

- Part of the 2017 Temple Mount crisis and Israeli–Palestinian conflict
- Location: 32°00′21″N 35°07′34″E; Halamish, West Bank
- Date: 21 July 2017; 21:30 (UTC+03:00)
- Target: Israeli civilians
- Attack type: Stabbing
- Weapon: Knife
- Deaths: 3
- Injuries: 2 (including the attacker)
- Perpetrator: Palestinian lone wolf

The Halamish attack, or the Halamish massacre was a lone-wolf attack on a Jewish family in the West Bank Israeli settlement of Halamish (also known as Neve Tzuf), that took place on 21 July 2017, in which three Israelis were stabbed to death and one severely wounded. The victims of the attack were Yosef Salomon, his daughter Chaya and son Elad, the three who were murdered in the attack, and Tova Salomon, Yosef's wife, who was injured but survived.

The assailant, Omar al-Abed, a Palestinian from nearby village, was shot by a neighbor and was arrested. Israel's Channel 2 reported the day after the stabbings that the attacker "identified with Hamas" and had previously been arrested several times by Palestinian security forces.

== Background ==
Following the 2017 Temple Mount shooting on the Friday the week before the attack, in which three Muslim Israelis attacked and killed two Druze policemen outside and inside the Temple Mount, Israeli authorities increased security measures in the area before the entrances of the Temple Mount. This included the installment of metal detectors.

Muslim leadership refused to accept the new measures, and called on their followers to protest the new measures and to pray in front of the Temple Mount, declaring that prayers of those who pass through the metal detectors were null and void. Three Muslims were killed in and around Jerusalem after ensuing riots.

== Attack ==
On July 21, 2017, a Palestinian youth armed with a knife jumped over the security fence at Halamish and entered a house with an open door some 100 meters (330 ft) from the fence, surprising members of the Solomon family who were preparing for a Shalom Zachar celebration for the birth of a grandson. He stabbed to death the 70-year-old grandfather Yossi, his 46-year-old daughter Chaya, and 36-year-old Elad who were all pronounced dead at the scene. The 68-year-old grandmother, Tova, was stabbed and injured seriously as well before escaping upstairs. Elad's wife and three children who were downstairs escaped upstairs and barricaded themselves in a room with two infants. An Israeli soldier home on leave responded, shooting the attacker through a window.

== Assailant ==
The assailant was Omar al-Abed, aged 19, from Kobar, a village near Ramallah. Two hours before the attack, Omar Al-Abed al-Jalil had called for the defense of the Masjid Al Aqsa on his Facebook page, writing: "Take your weapons and resist.... I only have a knife and it will answer the call of Al-Aqsa.... I know I am going and will not return." Al-Jalil carried a Quran and a bottle of water to the attack, and is believed to have ritually purified himself prior to entering the house and attacking.

Al-Abed was sentenced to 4 life sentences by the military court and damages of 2,5500,000 NIS ($724,634) to the victims. In their sentence, the judges wrote that "We also discussed the maximum sentence — the death penalty. Words cannot describe the extent of the atrocity committed by the defendant" and called for al-Abed "not to be released in any future deal". In a dissenting minority opinion, judge Dov Gilboa ruled in favor of the death penalty saying al-Abed "enjoyed the whole trial with a smile". The two other judges, Zvi Heilbronn and Menachem Lieberman, voted against the death penalty.

In May 2018, the Israeli Defense Ministry estimated that Al-Abed (who already received 12,200 NIS (US$3,370)), would receive 12,604,000 NIS (US$3.5 million) in payments from the Palestinian Authority by the time he reaches 80. The estimate was prepared in conjunction with Israel legislation which would allow for permanent deductions of transfers to the Palestinian Authority due to such payments, similar to the US Taylor Force Act.

== Aftermath ==
Several Israeli ministers have called for the death penalty to be called for by prosecution and applied. Military courts, where the case would be tried, can sentence death however this has not been a final judgement (following appeal) since Adolf Eichmann in 1962. The Israeli prime minister subsequently joined the calls for the death penalty.

Speaking before the United Nations Security Council on 24 July 2017, Israeli ambassador Danny Danon presented photographs of the Halamish attack and said "The terrorist who murdered this family did so knowing that the Palestinian Authority will pay him thousands of dollars a month". In a media event prior to the security council meeting on the subsequent day, 27 July, Danon together with Oran Almog, one of the victims of the Maxim restaurant suicide bombing, described the attack as caused by incitement, and demanded that the Palestinian Authority cease what it called incentivizing terrorism by paying stipends to the families of Palestinians killed, injured or imprisoned for involvement in attacking, assisting in attacking, or planning to attack Israel, or for other types of politically-inspired violence, including riots, violent demonstrations, and throwing rocks. According to Jonathan Schanzer, Omar Al-Abed's family would receive a salary of over $3,000 per month for his more than 30-year expected prison term, as the Palestinian Authority pays jailed attackers according to a sliding scale that rewards those imprisoned the longest.

After the mother of the alleged perpetrator publicly supported the actions of her son in Palestinian media, she was arrested by Israeli forces on 25 July 2017.

On 27 July, The IDF announced its intention to demolish the home of Omar al-Abed, the attacker who carried out the stabbing attack in Halamish a week earlier.

Five family members of the perpetrator were tried for misprision of felony, due to their suspected knowledge of the perpetrator's intent and lack of reporting of said intent to Palestinian or Israeli authorities, allegedly having read the perpetrator's Facebook post a few hours prior to the attack. Convicted by the military court, his two brothers and uncle received an eight-month sentence, his father 2 months, and his mother who was also convicted for incitement one month.

The assailant's house in Kobar was demolished on the night of 16 August 2017. Palestinians clashed with IDF forces during the demolition.

On the night of 29 August 2017, a recording studio was raided and three members of a Palestinian band from Beit Rima and nearby Kafr Ein were arrested for allegedly producing a song that lauded the attack. Singing that "real men" will be found in Kobar, and that the assailant "made the Zionists lie on the ground".

Following a stabbing attack at Geva Binyamin (Adam) by a Palestinian resident of Kobar in July 2018, Israeli authorities investigated similarities between the two attacks.

The survivor of the stabbing attack, wrote a page about the soldier on leave whom she described as a "quiet and modest hero", in the Our Heroes book marking Israel's 70 years of independence.

== Reactions ==
- Israel: Prime Minister Benjamin Netanyahu condemned the attack and expressed deep sorrow in his statement: "This is an act of terror perpetrated by a beastly person, based in unfathomable hatred. The security forces are doing everything in their power to maintain security, and will use all the necessary means to do this." President Reuven Rivlin expressed his sympathies to the grieving family and to all of the residents of Halamish, "It is the duty of the entire world, the duty of leadership wherever they are in the region and the world, to denounce the terrorism and incitement and to cooperate with the State of Israel in the war against it. Anyone who does not denounce terrorism collaborates with it."
- Hamas issued a statement calling the attack a "necessary reaction" to the new Israeli security measures at the Temple Mount. Additionally, in a tweet, they called it "heroic."
- United Nations: UN Secretary-General António Guterres strongly condemned the stabbing attack, he conveyed his condolences to the bereaved and wished a speedy recovery to those injured and called on all to refrain from any actions or words that could further escalate an already volatile situation.
- Secretary General of the Jordanian Opposition Coalition Mudar Zahran condemned the attack on Twitter: "We condemn yesterday's horrifying crime in Halamish. It's against Arab values to attack families and children, Jews or non-Jews, it's a shame".

== See also ==
- List of terrorist incidents in July 2017
- List of violent incidents in the Israeli–Palestinian conflict, July–December 2017
