= 2017 Temple Mount crisis =

Event in Jerusalem

- Part of the Israeli–Palestinian conflict
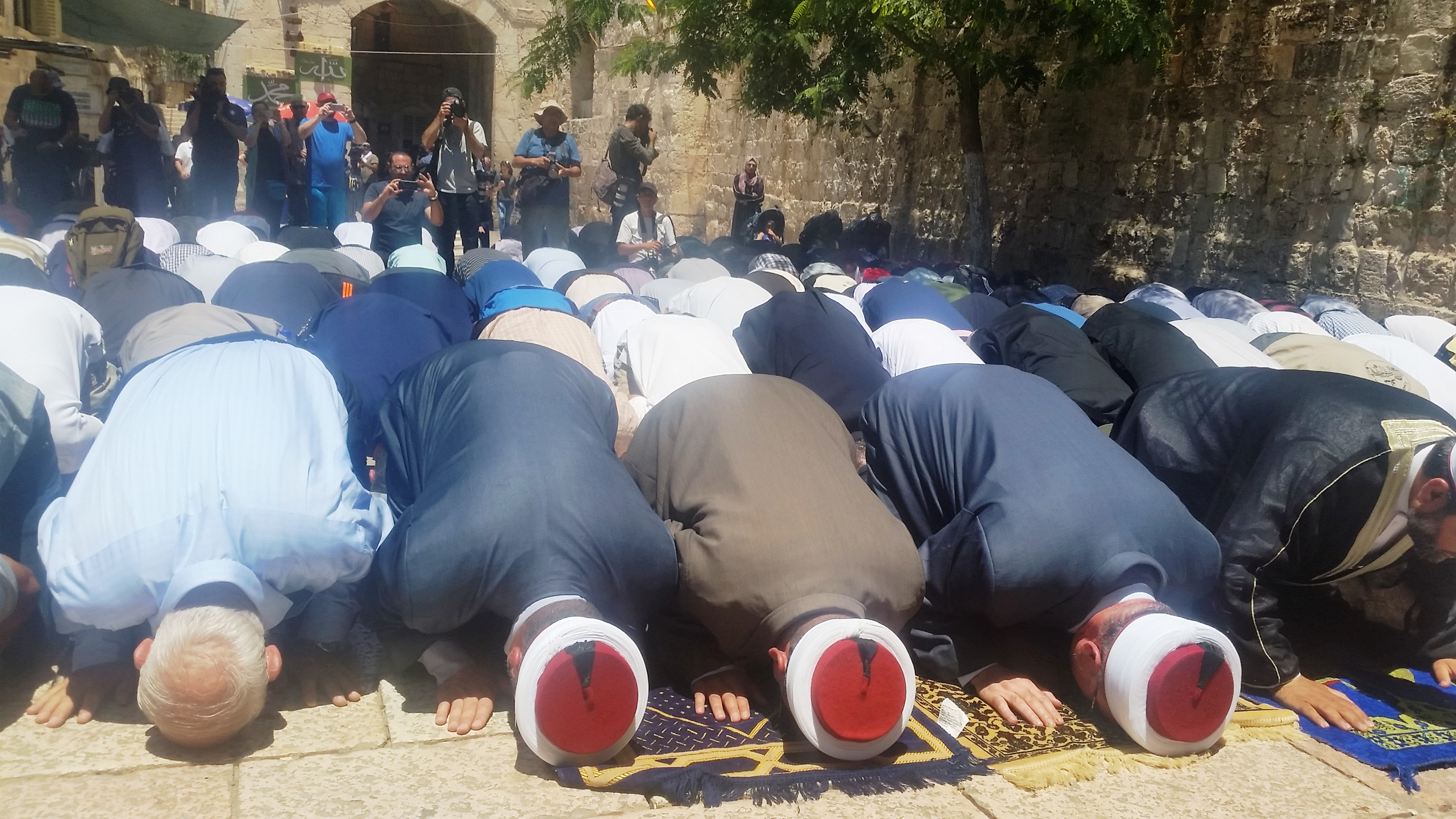
- Muslims praying at the entrance to the Temple Mount. They refused to go through the metal detectors.
- Date: 14 July 2017 — 28 July 2017
- Location: Jerusalem, Halamish, Petah Tikva, West Bank and Gaza Strip
- Caused by: 2017 Temple Mount shooting
- Result: Further Temple Mount entry restrictions.; 113 wounded in police clashes.; 11 deaths.

Parties
Islamic Movement in Israel: (Israel) Arab Israeli lone wolves; Palestinian Authority; (Palestine) Jerusalem Waqf; (Palestine) Palestinian protesters; (Palestine) Palestinians inside Temple Mount; (Palestine) Palestinian lone wolves; (Jordan) Jordanian lone wolves; (Hamas) Gazan protesters	Israel: Israel Police; Israel Border Police

The 2017 Temple Mount crisis was a period of violent tensions related to the Temple Mount, which began on 14 July 2017, after a shooting incident in the complex in which Palestinian gunmen killed two Israeli police officers. Following the attack, Israeli authorities installed metal detectors at the entrance to the Mount in a step that caused large Palestinian protests and was severely criticized by Palestinian leaders, the Arab League, and other Muslim leaders, on the basis that it constituted a change in the "status quo" of the Temple Mount entry restrictions.

The Jerusalem Islamic Waqf called Muslims to pray outside the Temple Mount, and not enter the mosque complex until the metal detectors were removed.

On 25 July the Israeli Cabinet voted to remove the metal detectors and replace them with other surveillance measures. Nevertheless, Palestinian activists decided to continue protesting, claiming those cameras represent a greater degree of control than the metal detectors. On 27 July, Israel removed the new security measures from the Mount, which led to the Waqf telling Muslims they could return to pray inside the compound. 113 Palestinians were reportedly injured in clashes with police after thousands of Muslims returned to pray at Temple Mount.

Within an 11-day period, eleven people had died due to the crisis.

== Temple Mount shooting ==
Shortly after 07:00 in the morning on 14 July 2017, three gunmen, armed with rifles and a handgun, left the Temple Mount and approached a police checkpoint in the Lions' Gate outside of it in East Jerusalem where they opened fire on officers of Israeli Border Police. Two Israeli border police officers were critically wounded and died later, and another two were moderately wounded in the attack. The three attackers fled back to the square in front of one of the mosques on the temple mount and were shot by Israeli police officers.

=== Aftermath ===
Israeli authorities shut down the Temple Mount complex, and for the first time in years, Friday prayers at the al-Aqsa mosque were canceled. The old city was also closed to traffic. The al-Aqsa mosque was raided by Israeli authorities and Jerusalem Islamic Waqf personnel were questioned. The Israeli police said they found additional weapons in the raid, including mock guns, knives, clubs, chains, and other weapons.

=== Disturbances on the Temple Mount ===
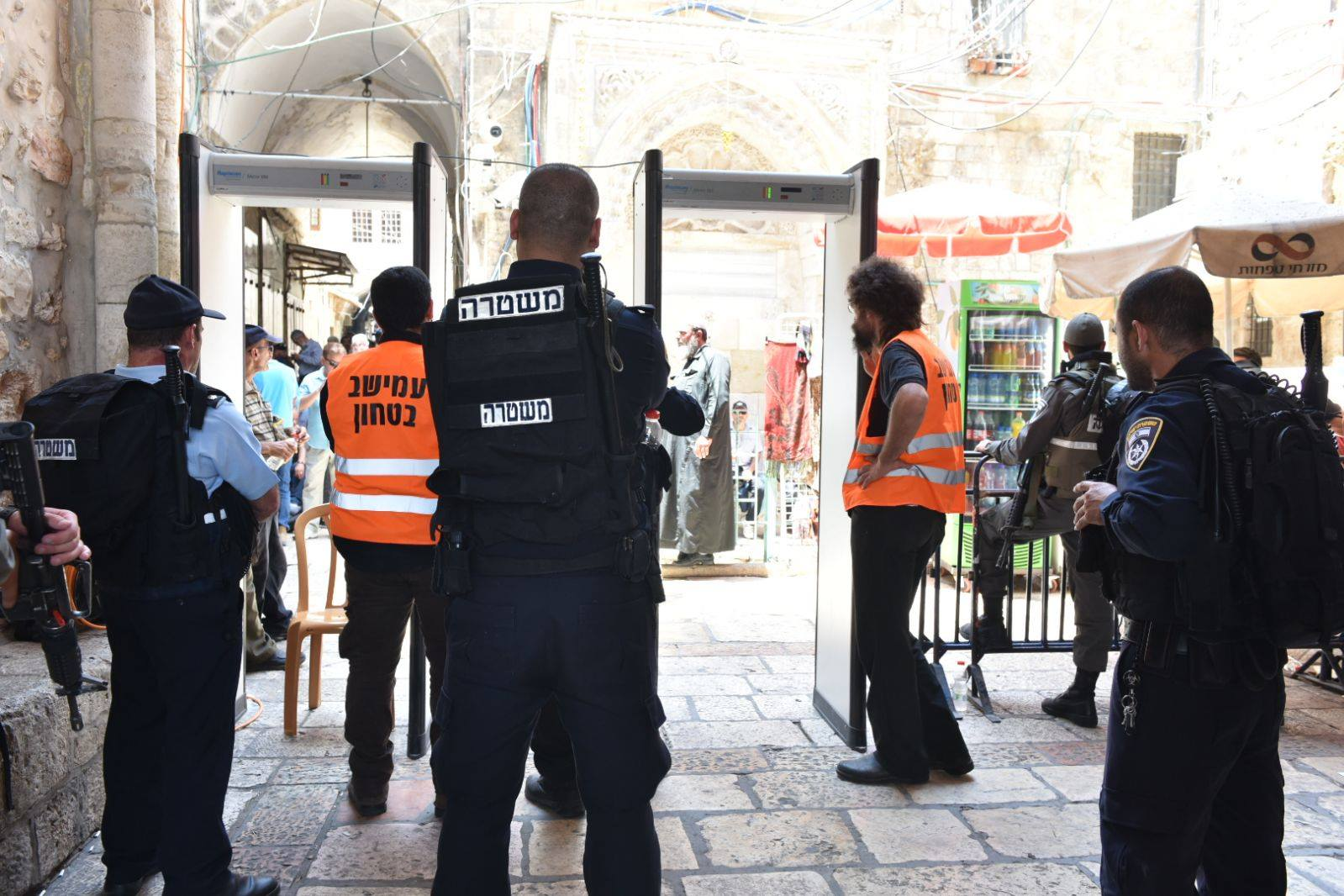
Metal detectors at the Temple Mount

On the 16 July, Israeli authorities reopened the Temple Mount, after placing metal detectors at the entrances to the compound. The Waqf called on Muslims to protest outside of the compound instead of entering, with around 200 Muslims protesting outside on the 16th. Israeli authorities also announced the installation of security cameras outside the compound. On 21 July, Palestinian President Mahmoud Abbas ordered the suspension of all official contact with Israel until it removed the new security measures.

Thousands of young Palestinians clashed with Israeli security services in protest of the new security measures put in place at the al-Aqsa mosque. On Friday, July 21, three Palestinians were killed in clashes with Israeli forces in Jerusalem's Old City, Palestinian officials said.

Following a ruling by the supreme court on the 25 of July, the attackers' bodies were released to their families on the night of the 26 July. In a show of support for the attackers, some 10,000 people marched in the funeral processing in Umm al-Fahm, praising the attack and calling the attackers heroes and shahids. Even though Umm al-Fahm is located inside Israel, (they are Israeli citizens) they still praised the terrorists during the funeral. But not all are radicalized. One relative said, "We did not want to talk too much about what happened, and we did not know at all that they were planning to shoot policemen in Jerusalem. If we had known, we would have stopped them."

The Islamic Waqf along with the Grand Mufti of Jerusalem announced on the morning of 27 July that Muslims can return to worship at the al-Aqsa compound after Israel completely removed the newly installed security measures. Following the victory celebrations that lasted all Thursday afternoon, thousands of Muslims entered the Temple Mount. Almost immediately after worshippers returned to the site, clashes broke out between worshippers and Israeli security forces with worshippers throwing rocks and security forces using tear gas and stun grenades. 113 worshippers were injured and one Israeli police officer injured.

On 28 July, Amid high security in the Old City of Jerusalem, thousands of Muslim worshipers attended Friday prayers at the Temple Mount. Crowds dispersed peacefully from the compound, because the entrance to prayer-goers was limited to men aged 50 and older and all women.

== Additional incidents ==
=== Halamish attack ===
On 21 July 2017, a 19-years old Omar Al-Abed al-Jalil broke into a Jewish house in the Israeli settlement of Halamish. He stabbed four people in the house, killing three of them. Before the attack he wrote in his Facebook account: "Take your weapons and resist.... I only have a knife and it will answer the call of Al-Aqsa.... I know I am going and will not return."

=== Petah Tikva attack ===
On 24 July 2017, an Arab Israeli civilian was stabbed in Petah Tikva, Israel, by a Palestinian man from Qalqilya. The incident is suspected as an act of terrorism.

==== Attack ====
The attacker, a Palestinian resident of Qalqilya, stabbed a bus driver near a Shawarma stand in the Israeli city of Petah Tikva, after he had entered to the shop. The assailant was arrested and taken for questioning by the Israeli police. the victim, a 32-years-old Arab-Israeli man, resident of the Arab village of Arraba, was in moderate-to-serious condition from stab wounds in his neck, and was taken to Beilinson Hospital.

The attack has been described by authorities as a terror attack, with the victim being attacked due to the attacker mistaking his identity for Jewish.

==== Perpetrator ====
The stabber, identified as 21-years old Palestinian man from Qalqilya, was illegally residing and working in Israel. He repeatedly told police just after the stabbing that he carried out the attack "for Al-Aqsa." He spent time in prison in the years 2015 and 2016.

=== Attack on Israel embassy in Amman ===
On 23 July 2017, a Jordanian man stabbed an Israeli guard at the Israeli embassy complex in Amman, Jordan. The Israeli authorities relate the attack to the crisis.

=== Disturbances in the West Bank ===
On 28 July, Clashes were reported in the West Bank between Palestinians and the IDF, particularly in Bethlehem, Nablus, Kalkilya, Hevron, Kafr Qadum and the Tomb of Rachel. The Palestine Red Crescent said that one Palestinian was wounded by live fire, two by rubber coated metal bullets and ten from tear gas inhalation during clashes in Bethlehem.

=== Confrontations on the Gaza border ===
Hundreds of youths reached the border area between the Gaza strip and Israel on Friday, 28 July. This was in response to a call by Hamas for protests to take place in solidarity with Palestinian Arabs in Jerusalem. An IDF spokeswoman said that soldiers opened fire at demonstrators trying to damage the security fence that separates Israel from Gaza. Warning shot were initially fired as protesters set fire to tires and hurled rocks. As a result of the clashes, 16 year old Abdulrahman Abu Hmeisa was killed and seven others were also wounded by Israeli gunfire.

== Reactions in the Arab World ==
=== Jordan ===
Following the terrorist attack that killed two Israeli policemen, a Jordanian statement called Israel to “refrain from taking actions that will violate the status quo in Jerusalem and the Al-Aqsa Mosque.”

=== The Palestinian Authority ===
On 21 July, Mahmoud Abbas announced that the Palestinian leadership will freeze all contact with Israel, as a protest over the new Israeli security measures. In order to encourage the demonstrations, The Palestinian Authority Martyrs Fund offered financial compensation to those involved. After the removal of the metal detectors, Abbas announced and called the Palestinians to continue the uprising. Also, as the leader of the Palestinian Authority, he guided the Tanzim to spread the violence to Judea and Sameria, on 28 July; the second day of rage.

=== Saudi Arabia ===
King Salman, sent a message to Jerusalem via the White House, urging Israel to reopen the Temple Mount to Muslim worshipers as soon as possible.

== See also ==
- 2014 Jerusalem unrest
- List of violent incidents in the Israeli–Palestinian conflict, July–December 2017
