= June 2017 Jerusalem attack =

Terrorist attack involving stabbing and shooting on 16 June 2017

Coordinates: 31°46′54″N 35°13′50″E

- Part of Israeli–Palestinian conflict or ISIL terrorism
- Map of the Old City of Jerusalem
- Location: Jerusalem
- Date: 16 June 2017; 19:30 (UTC+03:00)
- Target: Israel Border Police
- Attack type: Stabbing, mass shooting
- Weapons: Knives, improvised "carlo" submachine guns
- Deaths: 4 (including 3 attackers)
- Injuries: 4
- Victim: Hadas Malka (deceased)
- Perpetrators: Adel Ankush; Bra'a Salah; Asama Ahmed

On 16 June 2017, two Palestinian men opened fire on Israeli police officers in the Old City of Jerusalem, injuring four of them. An additional attacker stabbed a policewoman, she was critically injured, and later died in hospital. All three attackers were shot and killed by the Israeli authorities.

The Islamic State of Iraq and the Levant has claimed responsibility for the attacks, but Palestinian militant organisations PFLP and Hamas rejected the claim, saying that the perpetrators were members of their groups. On 17 June, Israeli authorities said that the attack was under investigation and that there is no evidence yet for ISIL involvement.

The attack was the third major terrorist attack in Jerusalem in 2017 after the 2017 Jerusalem Light Rail stabbing in which a British tourist was stabbed to death, and the 2017 Jerusalem truck attack in which four Israeli soldiers were killed and 17 others wounded.

== Background ==
Four soldiers were killed and 17 others injured in a truck ramming attack on 8 January 2017. Several stabbing and shooting attacks followed, but most attacks resulted only in injuries or the attackers being killed. On 6 April, three months after the truck attack, an Israeli soldier was killed in a car ramming attack, making it the second deadly attack in Jerusalem in 2017.

The attack occurred as the daily Ramadan fast was ending, the month of Ramadan being a period of heightened alert for terrorist attacks, including expressed call by ISIL to attack western targets.

== Attack ==
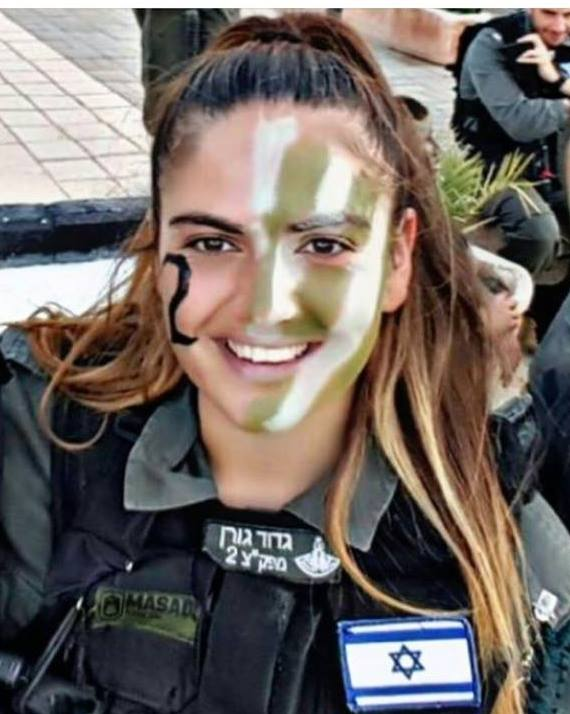
Hadas Malka, the victim of the attack

In the evening of 16 June 2017, a Palestinian man attacked a 23-year old Border Police officer with a knife, fatally injuring her before being shot dead. Moments after that attack, two Palestinian men armed with improvised "carlo" submachine guns opened fire on several other policemen in a different location, injuring four police officers before being shot dead. The victim of the attacks was identified as 23-year-old Hadas Malka.

The attackers were identified as 18-year-old Adel Hasan Ahmad Ankoush, 18-year-old Baraa Ibrahim Salih Taha, 19-year-old Osama Ahmad Dahdouh all from the West Bank village of Deir Abu Mash'al near Ramallah. According to the Israeli army at least two of the assailants were known to be part of a local cell and had been jailed in the past for throwing stones and firebombs.

== Reactions ==
- Fatah, the ruling faction of the Palestinian Authority, accused Israel of a war crime saying "Fatah condemns the war crime carried out by Israeli occupation forces in Jerusalem against three Palestinian teens,". The Israeli government, in response, demanded that the Palestinian Authority condemn the attack saying "The Prime Minister demands that the Palestinian Authority condemn the attack and expects the international community to do so too".
- Hamas praised the attack, stating that "the attack in Jerusalem is new proof that the Palestinian people continue their revolution against the occupiers and that the intifada will continue until complete freedom is achieved."
- UN Envoy Nickolay Mladenov said "I condemn yesterday's shooting and stabbing attack by Palestinian assailants in the vicinity of the Old City of Jerusalem", "Such terrorist acts must be clearly condemned by all", and "I am appalled that once again some find it appropriate to justify such attacks as 'heroic.' They are unacceptable and seek to drag everyone into a new cycle of violence".

== Responsibility claims ==
The Islamic State of Iraq and the Levant has claimed responsibility for the attacks, but Palestinian militant organisations PFLP and Hamas rejected the claim, saying that the perpetrators were members of their groups. On 17 June, Israeli authorities said that the attack was under investigation and that there is no evidence yet for ISIL involvement.

While the number of lone wolf attacks has significantly increased in recent spikes of Israeli-Palestinian violence and ISIL began active incitement on the Palestinian arena, until June 2017 the terror group had not claimed responsibility for attacks in Israel. However, Shin Bet and the IDF claimed an Israeli Arab from Northern Israel who killed 3 people in Tel Aviv in January 2016 appeared to be inspired by ISIS. Then in March 2016, two Israeli Arabs from central Israel, who were indicted for attempting to join ISIS in Syria, had allegedly discussed potential attacks against Israelis and the Palestinian Authority.

== Media coverage ==
The BBC faced criticism in Israel over its coverage of the attack, which published an article titled "Three Palestinians killed after deadly stabbing in Jerusalem." Israeli Prime Minister Benjamin Netanyahu deemed the reporting biased for omitting the fact that the three perpetrators were neutralized because they killed an Israeli policewoman. Netanyahu ordered the Israeli Ministry of Foreign Affairs to reproach the BBC, which updated the article headline to read: "Israeli policewoman stabbed to death in Jerusalem." then the BBC issued an apology for this headline admitting that its focus on the slain assailants, not the Israeli victim, was inappropriate.

== See also ==
- List of terrorist incidents in June 2017
- List of violent incidents in the Israeli–Palestinian conflict, 2017
- Timeline of ISIL-related events (2017)
