= 2017 Har Adar shooting =

Terror attack in an Israeli settlement on 26 September 2017

- Part of the Israeli–Palestinian conflict
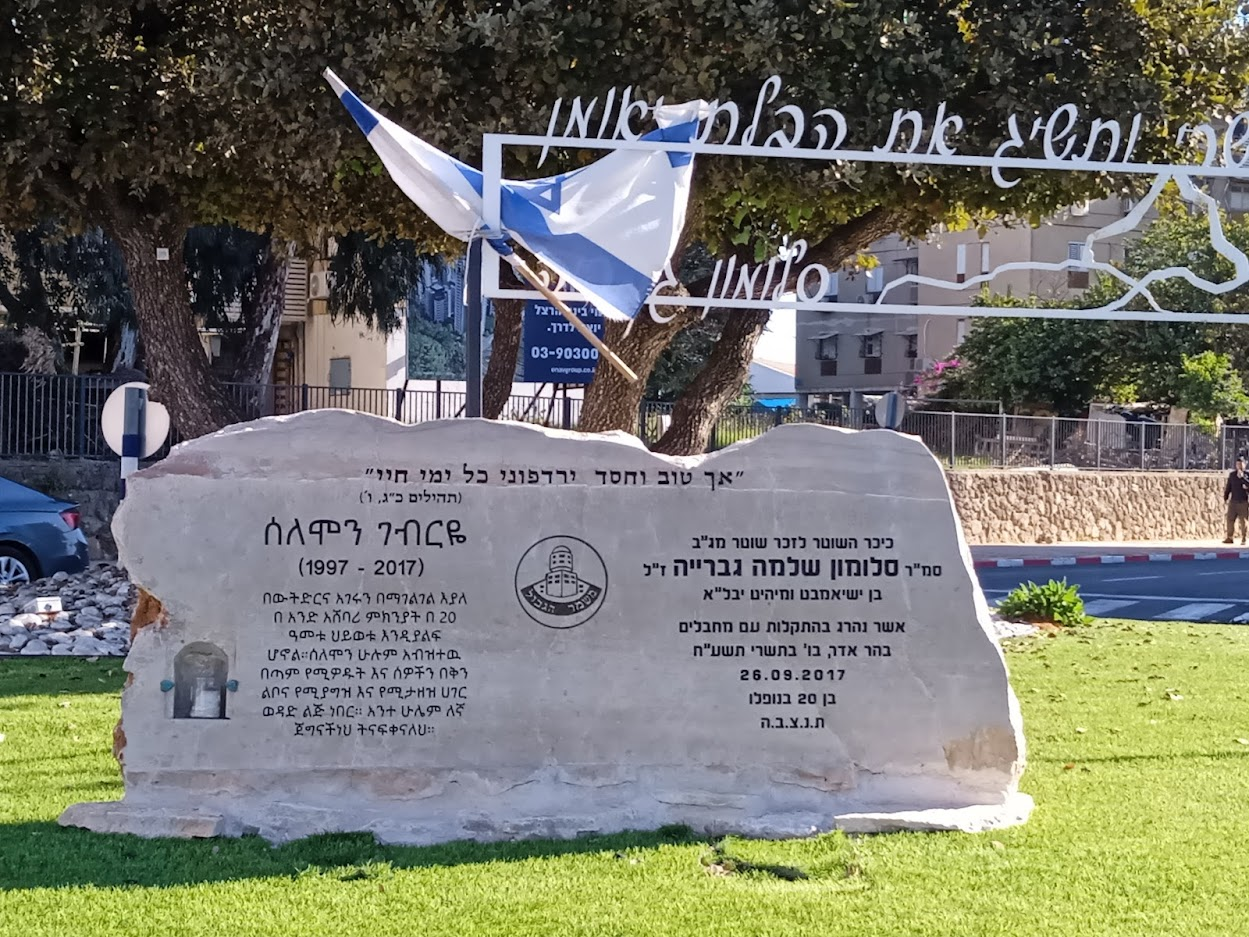
- HaShoter square in Be'er Ya'akov, named after Salomon Gavriya.

- The attack site
- Native name: פיגוע הירי בהר אדר
- Location: 31°49′44″N 35°08′11″E; Har Adar, West Bank
- Date: 26 September 2017; 7:14 am (UTC+3)
- Target: Israeli security forces
- Attack type: Mass shooting
- Weapon: CZ 82 pistol
- Deaths: 3 (+1 attacker)
- Injuries: 1
- Assailant: Nimer Mahmoud Ahmad Jamal

On the morning of 26 September 2017, a Palestinian gunman opened fire at Israeli security guards at the entrance gate of Har Adar, an Israeli settlement and affluent residential border community of Jerusalem located largely on the other side of the green line within the West Bank. Three Israeli security guards were killed and one was injured. The gunman was shot dead by the remaining guards. The Israeli authorities described the attack as an 'act of terrorism'.

== Background ==
Har Adar was initially built adjacent to the Green Line but has grown past it since the 1967 Six-Day War and is now largely located within the West Bank. Two hundred Palestinian workers enter the town through the gate where the attack took place daily. Around 100,000 Palestinians hold permits that allow them to work in Israel and within Israeli settlements, mostly as manual laborers.

== Attack ==
The attack took place as the gunman approached an entrance to Har Adar guarded by a border policeman and two civilian security guards. Border policeman Solomon Gavriyah (20) of Be'er Ya'akov was killed, as were civilian security guards Youssef Ottman (25) of Abu Ghosh and Or Arish (25) of Har Adar. A fourth man, the head civilian security officer of Har Adar, was injured. The attacker was shot and killed.

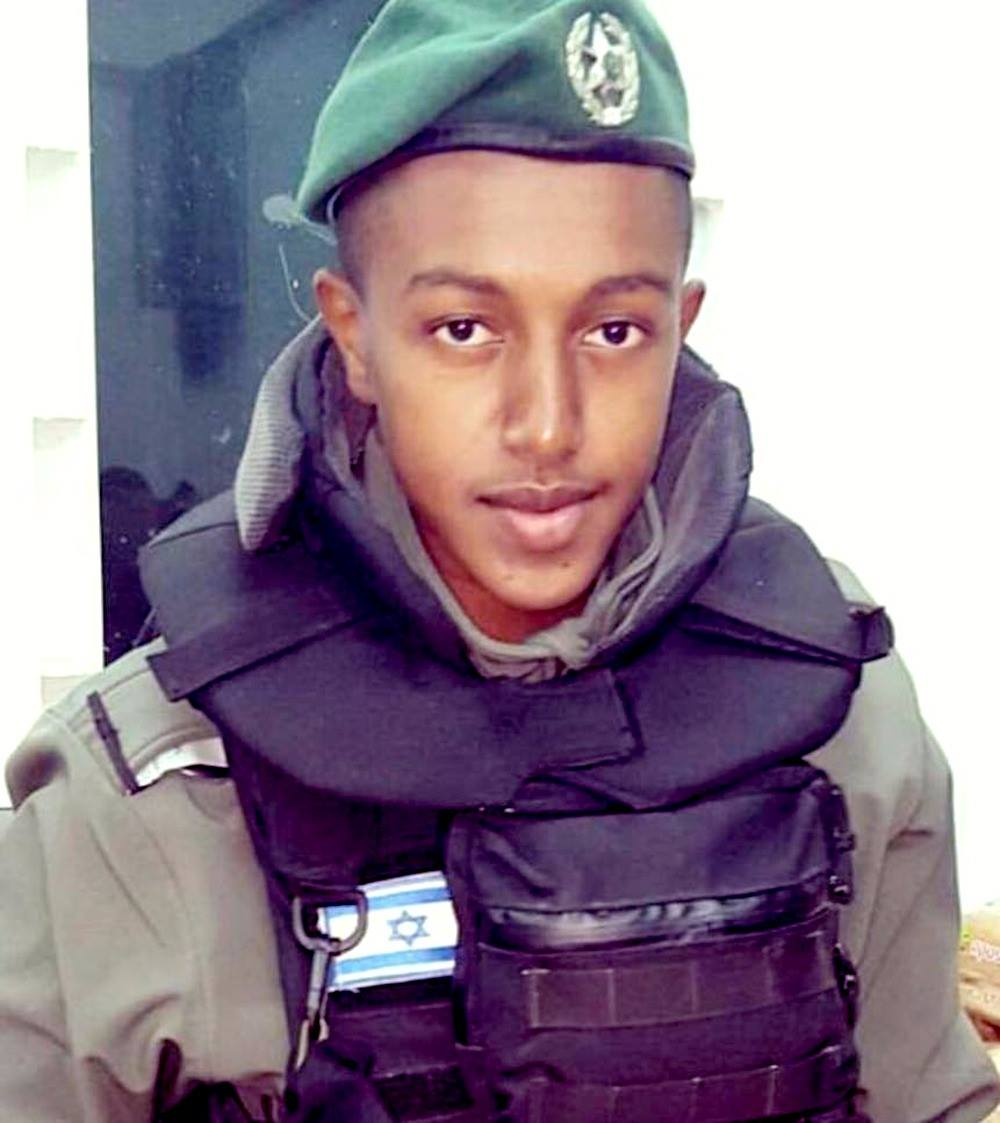
Sgt. Solomon Gavriyah was killed in the attack

Prior to the attack two Machsom Watch activists approached the checkpoint, upon which Gavriyah left the checkpoint and requested they step away. Police reported that one of the activists told Ethiopian-Israeli Gavriyah "You are a disgrace", which the activist later denied. Upon Gavriyah returning to his post the attacker began shooting.

== Assailant ==
The attacker was Nimer Mahmoud Ahmad Jamal, a 37-year-old man and a father of four, who was from the neighboring village of Beit Surik. He held a license to work in Israeli settlements. An initial inquiry into the attack uncovered Jamal suffered from severe personal and family issues, including domestic violence. It was reported that he physically assaulted his wife, and as a result, she fled to Jordan several weeks ago, leaving him with the children. Minutes before carrying out the attack, Jamal sent his wife a message on Facebook Messenger, apologizing for what he was about to do, mourned her departure and said he had been a terrible husband to her.

In another Facebook posting, also made just before the attack, Jamal said he "feared no one but God."

On 15 November 2017, the IDF demolished Jamal's house in Beit Surik.

== Diplomatic reactions ==
Domestic

- Prime Minister of Israel Benjamin Netanyahu blames Palestinian incitement for shooting attack.
- Hamas hailed the killings and called the shooting "a new chapter of the Jerusalem intifada".
- Fatah's official Facebook page referred to the attacker as a "martyr".

Supranational

- European Union condemns the attack, saying attempts by Hamas to glorify the attack are reprehensible. "There can be no justification for such a crime and attempts by Hamas to glorify the attack are reprehensible. Violence and terror will only achieve more loss and pain and must stop."
- (United Nations) UN special coordinator for the Middle East peace process, Nickolay Mladenov, said in a statement: "It is deplorable that Hamas and others continue to glorify such attacks, which undermine the possibility of a peaceful future for both Palestinians and Israelis. I urge all to condemn violence and stand up to terror".

International

- French Ambassador to Israel Hélène Le Gal and the French Foreign Ministry both condemned the attack, sending their condolences to the victims and said that France will always stand by Israel's right to peace and security.
- United States Embassy in Tel Aviv and the United States Consulate in Jerusalem issued a joint statement condemning the attack. The embassy in Tel Aviv deals with the Israeli government, and the consulate in Jerusalem is responsible for the Palestinian Authority. "We condemn in the strongest possible terms today’s horrific attack in Har Adar. We also condemn statements glorifying terrorism and call on all to send a clear message that terrorism must never be tolerated".

== See also ==
- List of terrorist incidents in September 2017
- List of violent incidents in the Israeli–Palestinian conflict, July–December 2017
