= Mudar Zahran =

Jordanian writer and activist (born 1973)

- مضر زهران
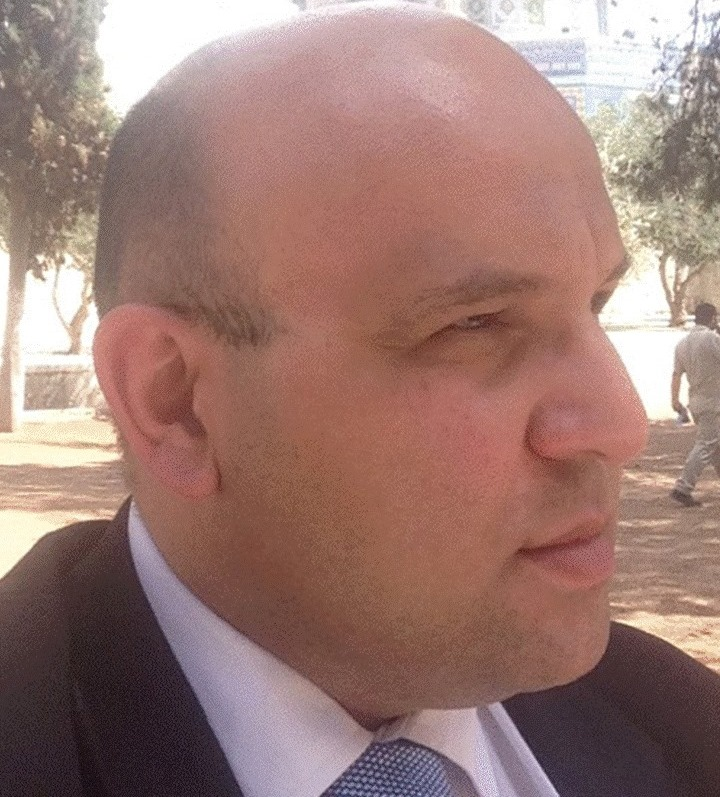
- Mudar Zahran in Jerusalem
- Born: April 19, 1973 (age 53); Jordan
- Occupations: writer; activist

Mudar Zahran (Arabic: مضر زهران; born 19 April 1973) is a Jordanian writer and activist of Palestinian descent. He is a proponent of the Jordanian option to the Israel-Palestine conflict, which would see Jordan as the Palestinian state.

== Early life ==
He was born in Jordan and holds two master’s degrees, and was pursuing a Ph.D. in finance, as of 2012. He is multilingual.

== Career ==
Zahran was a member of the Jordanian political party started by his father, al-Ansar, until his employment prevented his continued membership in the party. He worked at the Australian Embassy in Amman, and later as assistant policy coordinator at the American Embassy.

He refers to himself as the Secretary-General of the "Jordanian Opposition Coalition" and has close connections with the far right in Israel. He claims to be an "alternative to the Hashemite monarchy in Jordan." He left Jordan in 2010 to seek seek asylum in the United Kingdom, which he credits with saving his life from Jordanian authorities. A few months later, in May 2011, he was summoned by Amman’s Magistrates Court to appear there regarding a lawsuit by HSBC Bank in Jordan for failing to repay the bank up to 47,000 Jordanian dinars ($66,000). He helped lead the November 2012 Jordanian protests as part of the Arab Spring, and predicted the King of Jordan would not survive the uprising. He spoke at the Menachem Begin Heritage Center in August 2013.

He was charged by a Jordanian military court in December 2013 and scheduled to be tried in absentia on four separate charges, including "inciting hatred against the regime, sectarian strife, and insulting the king, as well as security services." The Jerusalem Post reported in February 2014 that he had been convicted and sentenced in absentia to jail with hard labor. He was denied entry into Israel on 12 September 2019, having allegedly planned to meet with Israeli settlement leaders. According to an Israeli Interior Ministry spokesperson, he had arrived from the United Kingdom and was denied entry for "security reasons" and immediately deported back to the UK.

== Personal life ==
Zahran has three children, two daughters and a son.

== Political views ==
Zahran is a frequent critic of Jordanian King Abdullah II and views Jordan as an apartheid state for Palestinians, comments which resulted in a backlash, and an apology sent to Ammon News, a Jordanian newspaper. He is a proponent of the Jordanian option to the Israel-Palestine conflict, which would see Jordan as the Palestinian state. He says he blames Arabs for mistreatment more than Israel. He said that "God supports a non-Muslim state, an infidel state that is just and fair, over a Muslim state that is unfair and treats its people with tyranny." He believes that "most Palestinians [and Bedouins] would rather have an Israeli citizenship than Jordanian citizenship." He accuses the Jordanian government of promoting division between Palestinians and Bedouins, and withdrawing passports from Palestinian citizens of Jordan. He also accuses the Jordanian government of propping up Islamists in order to appear moderate.

He wrote in December 2013 that the Jerusalem Waqf was neglecting the al-Aqsa mosque, taking the $280,000 in monthly donations and not using it for renovations and maintenance or for the poor and needy, as intended.

He is not a Zionist, but believes Israel is interested in peace. He noted that a cousin was killed by Israeli forces on his wedding day, but it was during crossfire between Israel and the Palestine Liberation Organization, which he says the al Jazeera report on the incident omitted. He is opposed to the "cynical exploitation" of the Palestinian cause by Arab leadership. He said that his family "never had a single relative killed in the so-called 'Jewish massacres of the Palestinians'" and blamed Egyptian leader Gamal Abdel Nasser for encouraging Palestinians to leave during the Six-Day War. He says the same occurred with his family in 1948. He criticizes Israel for signing the Oslo Accords in the belief that giving land for peace would result in the latter. He believes Israel should not negotiate with the PLO or Hamas.
