= Timeline of the Israeli–Palestinian conflict in 2017 =

The following is a timeline of events during the Israeli–Palestinian conflict in 2017.

== January ==
=== 1 January ===
- A Palestinian youth in Hizma, was shot in the head with a rubber coated steel bullet during clashes with Israeli forces in the village.

=== 2 January ===
- Israeli bulldozers demolished 11 residential structures in the Bedouin West Bank community of Khan al-Ahmar, leaving 87 Palestinians, mostly women and children, homeless. The UN condemned the demolition, stating that in the whole village, the homes of 140 people are under threat, after a long legal battle between the Israeli government and villagers to enforce a previous demolition order for the village, which previously reached Israel's High Court.

=== 3 January ===
- Shooting terror attack in downtown Haifa. An Arab-Israeli, a resident of Halissa neighborhood, killed a Jewish man and injured another.
- Israeli forces demolished some 15 structures, barns, homes and the hamlet's school, in Khirbet Tana, near Beit Furik in the Jordan Valley.
- According to initial Israeli reports 2 Palestinian motorcyclists were severely injured, and another lightly injured, at an Israeli flying checkpoint between Jenin and the al-Jalama checkpoint in a vehicular ramming attempt in which 2 Israeli border police also sustained injuries. Two Palestinian motorbikes were involved. The initial report was later revised defining the incident as an accident. It was later reported by Palestinian media that a teen, Sharif Khanfar, was apparently riding on a Vespa motorcycle with three friends when they were arrested for allegedly attempting to hit the Israeli soldiers, and that they were injured when struck by an Israeli jeep. Khanfar later required surgery which led to the amputation of his leg below the knee. Many circumstances regarding the event, according to the boy's lawyer, remain unclear.

=== 4 January ===
- 2 Palestinian homes, extending over 500 metres, built 15 years earlier without an Israeli license and owned by Adnan Shweiki in Shuafat, East Jerusalem were demolished by Israeli bulldozers. 18 people, of whom 10 were children, were dispossessed of their dwelling.
- Israeli forces on Wednesday demolished two Palestinian-owned homes in the neighborhood of Beit Hanina in East Jerusalem. The owner of one razed house, Amer Ubeido, stated his family had lived in the house for 16 years and that all efforts to obtain an Israeli permit had failed.

=== 5 January ===
- A tentative terror attack in Beersheba: A Bedouin man tried to grab the gun of a security man and beat him up. The suspect was arrested.
- According to Palestinian sources Israeli naval forces sunk the boat of a Gaza fisherman, Muhammad al-Hissi (33), who subsequently went missing off the coast of Beit Lahiya. Israeli sources stated that they were escorting boats that deviated from the prescribed fishing zone when an Israeli vessel collided with one, causing it to sink. He was declared dead, after search efforts failed to retrieve his body, on January 7.
- The Palestinian Ministry of Health stated that a car in which its deputy Minister Asaad al-Ramlawi was riding came under Israeli fire as it drove past al-Ram. Israeli sources stated no Israeli forces were present, and suggested the damage was due to local stone throwers.

=== 6 January ===
- A Palestinian was seriously injured while walking along a road near the settlement of Ariel when he was struck by an Israeli car. The identity of the driver is unknown.

=== 8 January ===
- Fadi Ahmad Hamdan al-Qunbar (28) of the East Jerusalem suburb of Jabel Mukaber drove his truck into a group of Israeli soldiers at Armon Hanatziv killing 4 and injuring 13 others, 3 seriously. The driver was shot dead while reversing on injured people. The fatalities were Yael Yekutiel (20) of Givatayim, Shir Hajaj (22) from the Israeli settlement of Ma'ale Adumim, Shira Tzur (22) from Haifa and Erez Orbach (20) from the settlement of Alon Shvut. The attack was claimed by an unknown Palestinian group called "The Martyr of Baha Alyan Collective", citing political motives. Israeli reports stated that his mother and 12 other kin would be stripped of their residency rights, and that their house was to be demolished. According to OCHA, in the wake of the attack, Israel demolished 4 structures in Jabal Mukaber area of East Jerusalem, and gave warning notices to the extended kin of the culprit regarding dozens of their homes which lack Israeli permits.

=== 10-23 January Overview ===
During this period, 3 Palestinians were shot dead and 26 Palestinians were wounded, among whom 12 children, during clashes throughout the West Bank. 10 were wounded when protests erupted at the razing of a home in Al-Ram. 44 Palestinian structures were demolished for lacking Israeli building permits in Area C and East Jerusalem, leaving 17 Palestinians without homes. Near Jericho (Al Jiftlik-Abu al 'Ajaj) and Nablus (Tell al Khashabeh), 19 structures, 15 built with humanitarian funds, were razed. The destruction of a road at Al Buweib near Hebron affected the livelihoods of an estimated 3,000 Palestinians. Following a ramming attack on 8 January, 11 structures were demolished in the area he came from in Jabel Mukaber, East Jerusalem.45 people were affected by the demolition. A further 80 buildings containing 240 families were issued with demolition notices on the same grounds in this suburb. 199 search and arrest operations by Israeli forces led to the arrest of 288 Palestinians. Settlers vandalized 56 Palestinian trees in raids on 2 Palestinian groves in Beit Lid and Turmus Ayya. They also beat up a Palestinian working his land at Burqa, Nablus. Israeli forces opened fire on Palestinians in Gaza and off the Gaza coast on at least 38 occasions for allegedly violating the Israeli-imposed Access Restricted Areas (ARA) leading to the wounding of 5 people, 3 of whom were fishermen and one a 10-year-old girl. On six occasions, 11 Palestinians trying to enter Israel or sail beyond the restricted zone. Several Israeli vehicles were damaged as a result of 17 incidents of Palestinian stone-and Molotov cocktail throwing. Stones thrown at the Jerusalem Light Rail train running through the Palestinian area of Shuafat also caused some damage.

=== 10 January ===
- Israeli forces shot dead 2 Palestinians The first, Muhammad al-Salihi (32), a corn-cob peddler, was shot dead during an Israeli predawn raid on the Far'a al-Faraa Refugee Camp in the Tubas Governorate area of the West Bank. According to his mother, the incident occurred when he protested loudly at the incursion into their home. He was shot from 6 to 11 times. According to Israeli reports he was shot outside his home, in the yard, when he advanced towards troops with a knife in his hand. In a follow-up report, Gideon Levy stated that blood was visible on the floor inside the house and that according to Salihi's mother, a widow they were woken by sounds the son took to be those of burglars. An altercation ensued, the son yelled ‘God is great’, at which he was shot several times. The knife shown in the Israeli photo, she added, is of one the house was not furnished with. Their house was reportedly raided in order to secure access to, and arrest, a neighbour in a nearby house
- The second incident occurred when IDF troops shot dead a 17-year-old boy during clashes in Tuqu' village (Bethlehem). Stones and Molotov cocktails were thrown during the clashes.
- Israeli forces destroyed part of an 11-km water pipeline servicing 4 Bedouin communities in the northern Jordan Valley sector of the West Bank. The villages affected were al-Ras al-Ahmar, al-Hadidiya, Khirbet Makhul, and Khirbet Humsa. The infrastructure had been built four years earlier with funding supplied by the NGO Action Against Hunger

=== 12 January ===
- 8 Palestinian structures, including businesses, spread over 1.2 acres in Jabal Mukabir were bulldozed by Israeli forces for lack of Israeli permits
- Palestinians in Isawiya hurled rocks at a force of the Israeli Police and Border Guard, aiding civilian vehicles after a car crash. No one was injured.
- Palestinians hurled a Molotov cocktail on the fence of the Israeli settlement of Beit El. Israeli soldiers chased their vehicle and lost them. Four suspects were arrested on 30 January.

=== 13 January ===
- 2 Palestinians, Abd al-Khaliq Barnat and Ashraf Abu Rahma suffered injuries during clashes with Israeli forces at the weekly Bilin protest march near Ramallah in the West Bank was treated on the scene by Palestinian medical crews after sustaining an unidentified injury.

=== 14 January ===
- According to Palestinian sources a Gazan youth was injured by Israeli troops while collecting firewood near the border barrier outside Beit Lahiya.

=== 15 January ===
- The ground floor home of Muhammad Muheisin, which is beneath 5 floors of apartments taken over by Israeli settlers in Silwan in 2014, was subject to a raid by settlers and reportedly damaged.
- Israeli border police arrested 4 masked settlers from the outpost of Geolat Zion, after observing them waving clubs and hurling stones at Palestinians farming in the vicinity of near Turmus Ayya. An indictment was laid against the four for "racially-motivated assault with intention to harm" on January 23

=== 16 January ===
- As part of a plan to connect Israeli settlements with a new road, Israeli forces started uprooting hundreds of olive trees on what are described as private Palestinians lands at the villages of Izbat al-Tabib, Nabi Ilyas, and Azzun in the West Bank district of Qalqiliya.
- Israeli forces shot dead, with four live ammunition hits to the chest, Qusay Hassan al-Umour (17) during clashes at Tuqu' near Bethlehem. Israeli reports stated he was the main instigator, among 200 rioters, of stone throwing. Video taken shows Israeli troops dragging the wounded youth 100 metres without a stretcher, and his unconscious body hitting the ground several times. Israeli sources say they were forced to retrieve the wounded youth this way because rocks were being thrown. In a follow-up analysis, Israeli human rights NGO B'tselem stated that the incident took place after the clashes, finally involving some 10 remaining youths of an original 80–100, had subsided, and that according to an eyewitness who was filming at the time, a sniper then fired 4 shots at youths in an olive grove hitting the one who was sitting down. A video clip documenting the incident shows one of the soldiers shooting at the legs of wounded man's sister Hiyam al-‘Amur, as she tried to reach him and shooting in the leg another youth trying to assist her. They conclude that the IDF report had no basis in reality.
- Israeli civil administration authorities confiscated two tractors owned by Nimr Moussa Hroub and Mithqal Fayez Naghnaghiyeh of Ibzig. The tractors were deemed a threat to human life and as having been obtained without Israeli permits.
- Israeli forces confiscated a truck of Hussein Ibrahim Masaed outside Ibziq near the village of Aqabah

=== 17 January ===
- Nidal Daoud Mahdawi, 44, owner of Israeli residency was shot dead by Israeli troops at a crossing near Tulkarem for approaching them with a knife in his hand. Israel reported that Mahdawi had been throwing stones at military members earlier.
- Layan Ayed al-Razem, 4, was reportedly hit by a settler vehicle as she crossed a street in southern Hebron,
- Israel forces demolished the home of Ahmad Muhammad Hamdan Bani Fadal together with an agricultural structure at Khirbet al-Taw in the Jordan Valley near Nablus.
- Khalid Abu Riyala a Gaza fisherman was shot several times by rubber-coated steel bullets. The incident occurred off the coast of al-Wahah in the northern Gaza Strip. Several boats were confiscated. Israeli sources say the boats deviated from the designated fishing zone set by Israel off Gaza's coast.
- Firas Mahmoud, to avoid paying an Israeli fine covering the costs of a future Israeli demolition ($78,518), was forced to bulldoze his own home. The house had been built recently for his family of 5, without an Israeli permit, in the Habayil al-Arab area of Isawiya.

=== 18 January ===
- Settlers in an apparent price tag operation damaged 12 olive trees in Turmus Ayya near Ramallah. Graffiti on rocks nearby spoke of ‘revenge’.
- Yacoub Abu Al-Qia'an, 47, was killed by Israeli police while homes in his home village Umm al-Hiran in southern Israel were being demolished. The car he was driving subsequently careened down a steep hill and killed Israeli Police Sergent Erez Levi and wounded another officer. Abu Al-Qia'an was called a terrorist by Israeli politicians and police officials but his name was eventually cleared three years later.

=== 20 January ===
- A tentative shooting attack: A soldier recognized a terrorist arriving by foot and shooting at a junction. No one was harmed, military forces arrived at the scene and searched for the attacker.
- A six-year-old girl in Gaza was reported in Palestinian sources to have been wounded in the stomach by an Israeli bullet near Beit Lahiya in the Gaza Strip. Israeli sources state they are investigating.
- Abed Hisham al-Sultan, a Gaza fisherman was injured after being struck by a rubber-coated steel bullet when Israeli forces opened fire on fishing boats off the coast. Israeli sources state they are investigating.
- Awad Mansour (12) was shot with a rubber-coated steel bullet in the hand by Israeli forces during clashes at Kafr Qaddum. Israeli sources say they are looking into the matter.
- Four Israeli settlers, including three off-duty soldiers, entered, for an unknown reason, the Palestinian village of Qusra and were rescued and evacuated by the village's mayor after a group of local residents circled them and hurled rocks at them. They were handed to the Israeli Army. Residents of the village said they suspected the settlers had entered specifically to instigate clashes, according to the Rabbis for Human Rights organization.
- Palestinians from Shuafat in East Jerusalem hurled rocks at the Jerusalem Light Rail and damaged a train door. No one was injured.
- Israeli troops chased, manhandled or beat up female members of the Jaradat family who had been observing clashes between Israeli troops and local people at Sa'ir. One Buha Badawi (20) was beaten over the head. Part of the incident was captured on video.

=== 23 January ===
- An Israeli soldier was lightly injured from a pipe bomb planted in a burned tire at the Palestinian village of Al-Mughayyir. According to the army the soldiers were sent to the village following reports of burning tires. As the soldiers were investigating the scene, one of the soldiers inspected a burning tire, when then exploded and lightly injured him.

=== 24 January ===
- Dozens of Palestinians were expelled from their homes in Khirbet al-Kurzaliya east of Aqraba in the northern Jordan Valley. The reason given was to allow military exercises.
- Israeli planes sprayed weedkiller along the Palestinian side of the border barrier between Israel and the Gaza Strip. The reason given was to improve Israeli visibility into the area. According to Palestinian sources, the effect was to damage crops or areas set aside for spinach, broad beans, barley and wheat planted far from the buffer zone. The complaint was being examined according to Israeli sources.

=== 25 January ===
- Palestinians threw Molotov cocktail at the fence of the Israeli settlement of Migdal Oz, causing a fire. No one was injured.
- Hussein Salem Abu Ghush (24) from the Qalandiya refugee camp reportedly tried to ram his vehicle into a group of Israelis standing at a hitchhiker's bus stop on Wednesday evening near a gas station in Kokhav Ya'akov in the West Bank. He was shot and killed by people present at the scene. A search of the vehicle discovered a knife in the driver's possession.
- Omar Nathir Ibrahim al-Barghouthi (26) reportedly opened fire on an Israeli military vehicle near the village of Aboud in the West Banka, and was shot by soldiers in response.

=== 26 January ===
- An Israeli soldier was lightly wounded in the foot in clashes that ensued when Israeli forces raided the Jenin Refugee Camp to arrest 2 men suspecting of being members of Hamas, and Palestinians hurled Molotov cocktails and pipe bombs. It is not known which side caused the soldier's wound.
- A car, the ethnicity of whose driver was not reported, injured lightly an Israeli soldier when the vehicle drove through the Beitunia checkpoint without stopping.
- Israeli bulldozers uprooted 500 14-year-old olive trees, planted over six acres of land under Palestinian cultivation outside the village of Kharas. They represented the only source of income for Mohammad and Faisal Moussa al-Hroub's families.

=== 27 January ===
- A Palestinian man opened fire at a vehicle near the Israeli settlement of Nili. The vehicle was damaged and no one was injured.
- 3 Palestinians were shot by rubber-coated steel bullets fired by Israeli forces during a night-time raid on the Jenin Refugee Camp. Those injured were Muhammad Lamiya Dbaya, shot in the leg and Ishaq Rafiq Abu Shahla and Malek Muhammad Amer, both wounded in the chest.

=== 29 January ===
- Muhammad Mahmoud Abu Khalifa (19) of Jenin was shot dead at the Jenin Refugee Camp with a live bullet in the lower back. 5 other Palestinians were wounded. Israeli sources say pipe bombs were thrown at them during the raid, soldiers were "faced with immediate danger" and the instigators were targeted and hit. There were no Israelis injured. Five members of Khalifa's family had been arrested in a raid some days earlier, on suspicion they were Hamas members.

=== 30 January ===
- Yahya Omar Ali Sarhan (19) was reportedly shot in the knee by Israeli troops posted in an olive grove near Tulkarem. According to Sarhan, the incident occurred while he was walking towards the Jabara checkpoint where he habitually sells lighters, Israeli sources say they are looking into the matter.
- Nahed Qabaha was injured and his minibus damaged when Israeli settlers threw stones at the vehicle near the village of As-Sawiya between Ramallah and Nablus. Qabaha was injured and required hospitalization. In all, it is said 10 vehicles were damaged.

== February ==
=== 2 February ===
- A Palestinian woman from Isawiya rammed her vehicle at a police cruiser near the gate of the Israeli settlement of Adam, lightly injuring two police officers and one security guard. She was shot by the forces in the scene and was sent to a hospital under arrest. The police said that in initial questioning the motive appears to be "personal".

=== 4 February ===
- A Palestinian teenager was shot and injured in his legs by an Israeli force after hurling rocks at a military post near Beit Furik. He was evacuated by the Palestinian Red Crescent.

=== 6 February ===
- A Gaza rocket landed in a field in southern Israeli, and Israel responded with a combined artillery and air forces attack targeting sites in the Gaza Strip. One casualty, a Gaza fisherman hit lightly by shrapnel, was reported.
- Later, in the evening Israel launched 8 missiles at several sites within the Gaza Strip.2 Palestinians in Khan Yunis were injured.

=== 7 February ===
- A Palestinian building under construction was razed in Beit Hanina.
- A sheep barn and other structures owned by Bassam Ali Radwan Fuqaha was bulldozed at Kardala, in the north east of the West Bank and on the grounds that it was built in an area declared by Israeli to be a military zone.
- Another structure was razed nearby Kardala, at Khirbet Ras al-Ahmar, on the grounds that it was too close to an Israeli military zone.

=== 8 February ===
- A Palestinian building in the Tal al-Foul area of Beit Hanina was razed by Israeli bulldozers.
- Taysir Ahmad al-Shaer's five-floor house in Tuqu' near Bethlehem was seized and turned into a military outpost. Israeli sources said the military were investigating the report
- The house of Izzat Yassin Abu Munshar Shuhada street in Hebron was sealed by Israeli forces, denying him access. Attempts to repair it had been impeded 2 years ago by Israeli settlers, and Palestinian sources said they feared the move was a prelude to the building being taken over by settlers.
- Suleiman Hamad Salah (85) of the village of al-Khader was run over reportedly by an Israeli settler on Route 60, the Israeli bypass road in the West Bank, and died soon after. A spokesman for the army said reports on the incident were being examined.

=== 9 February ===
- Palestinian sources report that Hussam Hamid al-Sufi (24) of Rafah, and Muhammad Anwar al-Aqraa (38) of Gaza City died after an Israeli air strike bombed a smuggling tunnel between Rafah and Egypt. 5 others were injured. This was denied by an Israeli spokesman. Israeli sources said the alleged tunnel attack occurred after 4 rockets were fired from Egypt's Sinai area towards Eilat in Israel.
- Sadiq Nasser (19) of Beita near Nablus shot and wounded 6 Israelis at the Petah Tikva market inside Israel. An Israeli Palestinian, Maed Amar from Kafr Qasim, was beaten up by passersby for yelling a warning to take cover in Arabic when the gunfire broke out, being suspected of complicity in the attack.

=== 10 February ===
- A room and a courtyard to the Silwan house owned by Arif al-Qarain were raided and occupied by Israeli settlers.

=== 15 February ===
- Israeli forces demolished two houses and a room of a third house leaving eight Palestinians homeless. The houses belonged to the Abd al-Aziz family of Hizma.

=== 16 February ===
- Rafat Muhammad Shihdeh Abu Arrar Masalmeh (36) from Deir Samet was hit, reportedly by a vehicle driven by a settler, sustaining several injuries outside Beit Ummar. The settler, later arrested, said it was an accident.

=== 21 February ===
- According to his family, Gazan fisherman Muhammad Imran Sabri Bakr, had received a critical bullet wound in the back after being arrested with four other fishermen off the coast of al-Sudaniyya, in the Gaza Strip.

=== 22 February ===
- The house of Luay Abu Rmouz in Beit Hanina was bulldozed. Built 7 years earlier, the owner stated that, he had paid $21,000 in fines meanwhile in attempts to secure a permit. He, his wife and 5 children were left homeless.

=== 23 February ===
- An Israeli soldier was injured when an explosive device was set off during a night raid on the Balata Refugee Camp in Nablus. Two Palestinians were also injured as protests involving stone throwing and Molotov cocktails erupted when 1,200 Jewish worshipper were escorted to Joseph's Tomb.

=== 24 February ===
- A 16 year old Palestinian youth from Gaza was shot by Israeli border guards with live fire in the leg, sustaining moderate injuries east of Maghazi refugee camp.
- Muhammad Salim Kaain (13) of Hebron was injured when leftover Israeli military ordnance exploded.

=== 27 February ===
- A Palestinian woman was shot and lightly wounded by Israeli forces at the Qalandiya checkpoint after they determined that she was approaching them carrying a bag in a suspicious manner, and not stopping as requested.
- A rocket fired from the Gaza Strip exploded in an empty area in the Sha’ar HaNegev zone of southern Israel.
- Israel launched multiple strikes across the Gaza Strip in retaliation. At least 2 missiles struck Hamas's Shuhada post, near Nusseirat refugee camp. Further missile strikes were made respectively at a monitoring post near Rafah city, and at the Hitteen post in Beit Lahiya. A fourth strike in Rafah's Nahda neighbourhood left 4 wounded, three moderately

=== 28 February ===
- An elderly Palestinian Hussein Hassan Qawariq (72) was shot in the foot and pelvis when he failed to respond to calls to stop while approaching the Huwwara checkpoint.

== March ==
=== 1 March ===
- Saadi Mahmoud Ali Qaisiya (25) a Palestinian from the village of ad-Dhahiriya was shot dead by an Israeli settler inside his home at Teneh Omarim. According to the IDF the Palestinian slightly wounded the 33-year-old Israeli who responded by shooting the alleged assailant. It was later claimed that the man had penetrated an Israeli outpost called Mor Farm. The family head heard noises outside and on emerging from his home, saw the man holding two knives. The man ran inside to get a gun and chased by the Palestinian who managed to stab him in front of his family before he was shot dead by the victim. The 33-year-old Israeli suffered slight wounds.

=== 3 March ===
- 2 Palestinians of Gaza were shot by Israeli forces near the border east of Beit Lahiya. One was wounded in the foot the other in the stomach.
- Ahmad Shawer, a Palestinian TV reporter was shot by a rubber-coated steel bullet in the head at Kafr Qaddum in Qalqiliya, while another was shot in the foot by Israeli forces during clashes that took place during the weekly march against the occupation.

=== 4 March ===
- An Israeli policeman suffered slight injuries when Palestinians in Silwan, throwing fireworks and stones, clashed with Israeli police.

=== 6 March ===
- Basel al-Araj resident of the village of al-Walaja was shot dead after a 2-hour gunfight with Israeli forces at the refugee camp of Qaddura. Al-Araj had been arrested, imprisoned and then released by Palestinian security forces, and was wanted on charges he was planning terrorist attacks. Palestinian sources say he was executed after he ran out of ammunition. He was shot over 10 times, with a fatal shot to the heart and several to the head. 2 other Palestinians involved in clashes with the raiding forces at the time also suffered wounds.
- 20 Israeli settlers from the illegal settlement outpost of Havat Gilad attacked Palestinian farmers working in their lands in the nearby village of Far'ata in the Qalqiliya district. settlers destroyed an agricultural tractor owned by Abdullah Shanaa, causing clashes to erupt, during which 55-year-old Mariam al-Salman suffered from bruises on her upper body after settlers threw rocks at her.

=== 7 March ===
- A Palestinian (22) perhaps at a nearby observation post was injured by Israeli artillery while the IDF was dismantling an explosive device near the border.

=== 9 March ===
- Settlers, reportedly from Maon, uprooted of olive saplings and doused Palestinian crops, worked by Fadel Jibril Moussa Rabiaa and his brothers in the village of al-Tawana, with pesticide.
- A rocket from the area of Khan Yunis in Gaza was fired in the direction of the Kissufim Israeli military site in southern Israel from eastern Khan Yunis, but fell short and exploded inside the Gaza Strip.

=== 10 March ===
- Israel shelled several sites at al-Qarara, eastern Khan Yunis and Deir al-Balah inside the Gaza Strip.
- An 18 year old Palestinian, was shot in the head by Israeli forces at Silwad.
- Israeli forces shot a Gazan youth, one of several approaching the border, in the foot near the Nahel Oz military post

=== 13 March ===
- Ibrahim Mahmoud Matar (25) of Jabel Mukaber was shot dead by Israeli officers near the Lion's Gate, East Jerusalem, at dawn prayers. According to Israeli reports, Matar had been detained after parking his car when he tried to pass through the Lion's Gate, and attacked two soldiers with what was described as a large butcher's knife inside the police post, lightly injuring one and moderately wounding another. A third officer then shot him with 4 bullets. According to Palestinian reports, Matar wielded a stick and was executed when he could have been arrested.

=== 15 March ===
- 5 Palestinians were injured by Israeli live fire during a raid on the Duheisha refugee camp. In addition to Ahmad al-Jiwi, Muath Abu Nasser, and Muhammad Faris Fararja, 2 sons of the Jenin governor Ibrahim Ramadan were wounded, while standing on a roof-top. When the two brothers tried to rush him to hospital their car was reportedly sprayed with fire in the village of leaving the second brother Mahmoud (34) with a head wound.
- The 18-year-old two-room home of Muhammad Abu Salih was demolished in the Ein al-Luzah area of Silwan for lack of an Israeli building permit.
- Ahmad Radaideh (27), from al-Ubeidiya was shot in the thigh when detected trying to pass through the Separation Barrier at Wadi Abu al-Hummus area near Bethlehem.
- Fatima Jibrin Taqatqa (16) from Beit Fajjar was shot, and left in a critical condition. After the car she was driving ran over a median strip and hit posts near a bus stop close to the settlement of Gush Etzion. Israeli reports state that it was a vehicular attack.
- A shell fired from Gaza hit open land in Israel's Sdot Negev region.

=== 16 March ===
- In retaliation Israel launched two airstrikes in northern Gaza striking with missiles the Izz al-Din al-Qassam Brigades training site and taking out electricity lines in Shuja'iyya.
- Israeli naval units opened fire on Palestinian fishing boats off the Gaza coast. No injuries were reported.
- Israeli settlers raided the grape arbour of Nader Salah Abd al-Salam in the Khilet al-Fahm area near al-Khader and destroyed 90 grape seedlings. His property abuts the Eliazar and Daniel settlements.

=== 17 March ===
- Fadi Abed (41) a Palestinian taxi driver was assaulted by 2 Israelis, who reportedly beat him several times with wine bottles causing fractures, after changing the destination in East Jerusalem.
- Murad Yusif Abu Ghazi (16) was shot dead with a bullet wound to the chest, and Saif Salim Rushdi (17) survived a similar wounding, during clashes arising when Israeli forces raided the al-Arrub Refugee Camp. Israeli reports say firebombs had been thrown on a road nearby.

=== 18 March ===
- After a Gaza projectile, two others falling short and landing inside the Gaza Strip, hit open ground in the Hof Ashkelon Regional Council, Israeli responded with artillery fire on the al-Ghoul area near Beit Lahiya, and launched missile strikes against a Hamas outpost in the north of the Strip.
- Israeli officials state they are examining reports that gunboats opened fire on Gaza fishermen who say they were fired on in the coastal waters of Beit Lahiya.
- 8 Palestinians were injured by Israeli rubber-coated steel bullets in clashes that arose during the funeral of Murad Yusif Abu Ghazi. An Israeli soldier was slightly hurt by a stone thrown by a participant.

=== 21 March ===
- An elderly Palestinian woman, Hilweh Abu Ras (70) sustained moderate to serious injuries when she was struck by a settler vehicle driving near the village of As-Sawiya. The driver fled the scene.
- A Palestinian was arrested after allegedly throwing an explosive device near the al-Jalama checkpoint in the district of Jenin.

=== 22 March ===
- Youssef Shaaban Abu Athra (18) was killed by Israeli tank artillery fire. 2 other Gazan Palestinians were wounded. Israeli sources state that the 3 had been detected in proximity to the border fence with Israel, in the area of the Gaza Strip Israel considers a 'no-go zone'. The army is investigating a suspicion that the three might have been trying to plant an explosive device.
- Israeli reports state 4 youths were shot near the al-Jalazun refugee camp after they threw firebombs near the settlement of Beit El, after leaving their car. Muhammad Mahmoud Ibrahim al-Hattab (17) died from wounds to the chest and shoulder. The 3 who were critically wounded were Jassem Muhammad Nakhla (18) shot in the head and foot, Muhammad Hattab (18), shot in the abdomen, Muhammad Moussa Nakhla (18), shot in the foot and shoulder. Palestinian sources say they couldn't have been shot, as claimed, after leaving their car since video evidence shows the vehicle was riddled with bullets. Palestinians later claimed the fire came from a military tower and was directed to the youths in the vehicle. Jassem Muhammad Nakhla died on April 10. He had been declared clinically dead since the incident.

=== 24 March ===
- Israel live fire wounded 5 Palestinians, while rubber-coated steel bullets injured a further 7 during clashes at were injured with live fire, while seven others were injured with rubber-coated steel bullets by Israeli forces on Friday. Clashes emerged during a demonstration by Palestinians from the villages of Kafr Malik and Mughayyir, against the appropriation of their lands for a new Israeli outpost. Israeli sources spoke of a ‘violent riot' taking place 'with more than 500 rioters lighting tires and throwing rocks at Israeli forces’.
- 2 Palestinian fishermen, Rajab Abu Mayala and Khader al-Saadi, from Gaza, detained the day before while sailing 3 nautical miles offshore, were reportedly injured the day after while under detention. Both were being treated in Israeli hospitals. Their fishing boats and equipment were confiscated.

=== 25 March ===
- A Palestinian in East Jerusalem's Beit Hanina quarter was compelled to tear down the roof of his house because it lacked an Israeli permit. He did so to avoid paying the costs, deemed exorbitant, of an Israeli demolition. The house was built 7 years ago, the roof being added 3 years ago.

=== 27 March ===
- 2 Palestinians suffered minor wounds from rubber-coated steel bullets during clashes at Israel's Atara military checkpoint outside 'Atara, near Ramallah.
- Malik Bassam Ismail Saada (19) from the West Bank village of Halhul moderately wounded an Israeli woman in a knife assault at Lod. The attack was initially regarded as a criminal incident, arising from an attempt to steal a car. On April 1, the indictment was changed to a "nationalistically motivated crime' when Saada reportedly confessed that he had planned to attack a Jewish woman because he was 'fed up with his life', and thought of ending it by provoking a suicide by cop action.

=== 29 March ===
- Siham Nimr (49) of Shuafat refugee camp was killed by Israeli forces after she reportedly tried to stab them with a pair of scissors at Damascus Gate.

=== 30 March ===
- 50 Palestinians were reportedly injured by rubber-coated steel bullets fired by Israeli forces on a march from Madama, near the Israeli settlement of Yitzhar. The protest aimed to plant trees on village land said to be confiscated for the nearby settlement. The deputy governor of Nablus, Anan al-Atiri, was among those injured. Israeli sources say they were putting down a riot.

=== 31 March ===
- 4 Palestinians were slightly injured by rubber-coated bullets when Israeli forces intervened against the weekly protest march at Kafr Qaddum. The village water supply service was also interrupted when a bulldozer accompanying the soldiers broke the main network pipes.
- An Israeli soldier was lightly injured by a stone thrown at Ni'lin.

== April ==
=== 1 April ===
- Utayba Jiyad Hussein Amireh. (15) was shot with live ammunition near the village of Ni'lin by Israeli forces. Israeli sources allege he threw a Molotov cocktail at a settler's car.

=== 3 April ===
- In the Wadi Qana valley of the Salfit Governorate region, Israeli forces were reported by Palestinian sources to have uprooted 135 olive trees and demolished a 40-metre-long stone retaining wall. Israeli sources corrected this upwards, the bulldozed trees being 150 in their estimate. The trees had been uprooted for being planted without an Israeli permit and because their presence ‘damag(ed) the natural view and values’ of the nature resort Israeli had established in the West Bank.
- Some houses in the Gaza Strip were reportedly damaged by Israeli firing from military pillboxes
- Drones were reported to have sprayed "poisonous pesticides” on melon, watermelon, okra, and wheat crops on the Gaza side of the border in the centralò and southern areas.
- After shots were found to have left holes in a wall in the Israeli settlement of Shave Shomron Israel closed down all roads west of Nablus.
- Israeli forces demolished several Palestinian-owned structures, owned by Othman Abu Sbeitan, Ahmad Shibr, and Ayman al-Dayah in the village of az-Za'ayyem in the central occupied West Bank district of Jerusalem. The razed structures included 3 apartment buildings, comprising 13 homes an agricultural shed, and five retaining walls.
- Israeli forces confiscated a Tariq Abu Oun's mobile home in Furush Beit Dajan east of Nablus for lack of an Israel permit.

=== 5 April ===
- Farmers in Khan Yunis complained that Israeli planes were flying over the Gazan side of the buffer zone and spraying pesticides on farmlands.
- Akram al-Atrash (23) was critically wounded with three live fire bullets during clashes that arose during a predawn Israeli raid on the al-Duheisha refugee camp. Israeli sources say he was shot after being identified as the main instigator of episodes of rock and Molotov cocktail throwing at soldiers.
- In 2 separate incidents Israeli forces fired on Gaza fisherman off the coast of the Gaza Strip, and made an incursion into the area near the border to raze land. Palestinians complain that such bulldozing destroys much of the enclave's the agricultural sector.
- Marwan Zakariya al-Asous (28) was shot in his lower limbs by Israeli live ammunition in Hebron. His wounds were moderate. An Israeli IDF spokesman said they would examine the incident.
- Israeli forces demolished three residential barracks and four tents owned by Muhammad Shahbir in the Abu al-Raish area of the village of Deir Ballut, causing the family to be displaced for the second time. The Shahbir family had relocated there after being removed by force by Israeli authorities from the Deit Daqla area, on the grounds their home was deemed too close to Israel's Separation Wall.

=== 6 April ===
- Elchay Teharlev (20) an Israeli soldier died after being hit by a Palestinian car driven by Malik Ahmad Moussa Hamid (23) from the village of Silwad. The incident occurred near the Israeli settlement of Ofra. The car had been fired on. Another soldier suffered slight injuries. Hamid was arrested. Two of his friends Anas Bassam Hammad and Muhammad Abd al-Rahman Ayyad, had carried out separate car-ramming attacks in December 2015, and were shot dead as consequence.
- After lodging a formal complaint with Jerusalem's municipal authorities regarding what they said was Israeli tunnel-digging in the Wadi Hilweh area of Silwan in East Jerusalem, which had caused severe damage to the structures, as evidenced by an inspection, the families of Hamed Oweida, Abed Oweida, and Suleiman Oweida, numbering 16 people, were ordered out of their homes, which were then sealed. An Israeli authority dismissed the accusations, declaring that the move was taken out of "concern for their own welfare," adding that the homes had been constructed "without regard for building codes or safety standards." ."

=== 7 April ===
- Unknown gunmen fired on an Israeli military post near the settlement of Psagot in the West Bank.
- According to Palestinian reports, an Israeli vehicle tried to run down 2 Palestinians, Muhammad Bassem Khader al-Alami (25) and Said Samir Hassan al-Salibi (20) near the town of Beit Ummar.

=== 13 April ===
- 6 Palestinian students were injured by Israeli rubber-coated steel bullets during a raid on Abu Dis. The incident occurred outside Al-Quds University’s campus in East Jerusalem.

=== 14 April ===
- Palestinian reports state that 3 children were injured with rubber-coated stell bullets during a demonstration at Kafr Qaddum. A further incident in which a Palestinian was wounded by Israeli live fire was also reported.
- In the 2017 Jerusalem Light Rail stabbing A Palestinian stabbed and killed a British student in the Jerusalem Light Rail near Tzahal square. Two others, one a pregnant woman, were injured following the incident. The attacker was Gamil Tamimi (57), a Palestinian from the Ras al-Amud neighborhood of East Jerusalem, with a history of mental disorders, known to security services for having molested his daughter some years earlier. He had recently been released from a mental health facility where he was treated for attempted suicide after swallowing a razor. The attacker was also convicted of molesting his daughter. According to Israel's domestic security service, Shin Bet, the attacker was known to the authorities and this may have been a “suicide by soldier,” a phenomenon seen in other incidents in the last 18 months, "in which a Palestinian suffering from mental health or personal issues has chosen to carry out an attack as a way out of his problems."

=== 16 April ===
- Muhammad Amin Shqeirat's home, a caravan for housing 10 family members, built after his original home was demolished last year for lack of an Israeli permit, was demolished by Israeli bulldozers in Jabel Mukaber.
- Ammar Salamah Hdedoun's home was bulldozed by Israeli forces. The unit was a caravan built in Jabel Mukaber in 2011 to house 7 members of his family after authorities had demolished his home in 2009 for lack of an Israeli permit.

=== 18 April ===
- Israeli forces shot 11 Palestinians with rubber-coated steel bullets during clashes in Abu Dis and al-Eizariya.

=== 19 April ===
- Israeli forces destroyed the iron gates at the entrances to several Palestinian commercial properties and farms in Isawiya, in order to serve evacuation notices. Fences for penning animals were also torn down on the grounds they lacked Israeli permits.
- Suhaib Moussa Mashour Mashahra (21) from al-Sawahira was shot dead after his vehicle was said to have hit a bus stop near the Israeli settlement of Gush Etzion and an Israeli citizen was reportedly injured. Palestinian sources state that photo evidence shows the car had run into an Israeli bus. The hurt Israeli suffered a slight to moderate injury to his head.
- Palestinian sources state that agricultural land, including olive trees, was damaged by a wastewater leak from the Israeli settlement of Ariel. Israeli authorities replied that they were repairing a damaged sewage pipe from the settlement.

=== 20 April ===
- A Palestinian girl, Kawthar Muhammad Shawriya (17) was struck by a settler's car while walking in Tuqu', near the Israeli settlement of Tekoa. She was reported to be moderately injured. The car was chased by Palestinians, who stopped the vehicle and detained the man until the arrival of Israeli police.

=== 22 April ===
- A large group of settlers from Yitzhar reportedly attacked the village of Urif, smashing the windows of several houses. Clashes arose, and when Israeli troops intervened 4 Palestinians, Adel al-Safadi, Jihad Saad, Mustafa Fawzi, and Sharif Abd al-Hafith, received injuries from rubber-coated steel bullets
- Settlers attacked Huwara, near Urif and the settlement of Yitzhar. A local woman, Badiah Muhammad Hamdan (72), and a young man, Ahmad Yousif Udah, were injured and hospitalized.
- Asim Salim (19) from Nablus city was hit by a vehicle, reportedly driven by an Israeli settler, while crossing the road al-Masoudiyya, west of Nablus. The driver fled the scene.

=== 23 April ===
- Fatima Mahmoud Ubeid (52) suffered a critical wound and was blinded in one eye when Israeli forces intervened in a local dispute in Isawiya with riot dispersal methods. Her husband stated she had been shot with a rubber-coated steel bullet while sitting on the family balcony.

=== 24 April ===
- A Palestinian woman, Asya Kabaneh(Kaabna,) (39/41) from the village of Duma, stabbed an Israeli woman soldier lightly in the shoulders at the Qalandiya military checkpoint. The woman was detained and confessed that she had acted after a marital dispute and had tried to commit suicide by provoking Israeli forces to shoot her.

=== 25 April ===
- Amjad Maher Jaafar (17) was shot several times in the stomach at the Huwara checkpoint. He was reported to be carrying a schoolbag and to have attempted to rush Israeli soldiers with a knife in hand.

=== 26 April ===
- Settlers are said to have set fire to a vehicle owned by Mustafa al-Damidi of the village of Huwara, near the settlement of Yitzhar.
- Saleh Omar Saleh (16) from Balata refugee camp, a cousin of Amjad Maher Jaafar who was shot a day earlier, was critically wounded at the Huwwara checkpoint after rushing towards Israeli troops with a knife in his hand.
- 3 Palestinian youths were injured by rubber-coated steel bullets during clashes with Israeli forces at the Shuafat Refugee Camp.

=== 27 April ===
- Settlers reportedly beat up Ali Qabaha, of the village of Ya'bad near Jenin, after stopping his car near the settlement of Shavei Shomron. He required hospitalization.
- 6 Palestinians were shot by Israeli live fire and a further 3 were wounded by rubber-coated steel bullets, in clashes near the Beit El military checkpoint outside al-Bireh.
- After shots were fired from the Gaza Strip at Israeli soldiers over the border, Israel responded by launching two mortar shells east of Deir al-Balah.
- All the pipelines supplying the village of Bardala with water were bulldozed by Israeli forces, depriving the 3,500 inhabitants of water. Israeli sources say the water was being stolen for agricultural purposes, a charge denied by Palestinians
- Protesting villagers in Al-Bireh at a prisoner solidarity march claim that they were fired on by settlers from the Israeli settlement of Psagot.

=== 28 April ===
- Over 8 warehouses in Beita were destroyed by fire when Israel gas canisters set the area alight. One youth was also injured by a rubber-coated steel bullet.
- During demonstrations for a Day of Rage over Israel's detention of Palestinian prisoners, 3 youths were injured by Israeli fire at Nabi Salih, one when struck in the head with a tear gas canister, the other two from while two others were injured in the legs with tutu bullets. Another youth was shot in the leg at Silwad, while the Qalandiya checkpoint, 2 Palestinians were injured by shrapnel from Israeli live fire, and a third was wounded by a rubber-coated steel bullet.

=== 29 April ===
- According to Palestinian reports, settlers from the settlement of Yitzhar settlement attacked villagers at Urif, resulting in two people being injured, One person, Munir al-Nuri, was hurt by rocks thrown by the settlers. The other, Taysir al-Safdeh (55) was shot in the leg by a rubber-coated steel bullet when Israeli forces intervened.

=== 30 April ===
- 13 Palestinian journalists were hurt when Israeli forces dispersed a sit-in, reportedly ‘peaceful’, on behalf of 1,500 detained Palestyinian prisoners, at Damascus Gate.

== May ==
=== 2 May ===
- A 19 year old youth, described in initial Israeli reports as a Palestinian, was shot dead at the Hizma checkpoint in East Jerusalem after reportedly rushing police with a knife in his hand. An investigation later clarified that he was an Israeli from the settlement of Pisgat Zeev

=== 3 May ===
- A Palestinian child was hospitalized for a head injury after being reportedly being hit intentionally by an Israeli settler driving in the town of Yatta in the southern occupied West Bank.
- Wissam al-Dibs from Shuafat Refugee Camp was arrested after he pulled a knife at a checkpoint. Israeli border police allege he tried to carry out a stabbing attempt. No one was injured.

=== 4 May ===
- Israeli forces fired bullets, stun grenades, and tear gas at a Palestinian hospital in the central occupied West Bank city of Ramallah at dawn on Thursday, sparking condemnation from the Palestinian Authority. Many patients, including children, suffered from tear gas inhalation. Israeli officials assert that Palestinians located inside the hospital grounds threw stones at Israeli soldiers.
- 3 buildings were razed in East Jerusalem. One was owned by Khalil Abu Sneineh and Rami al-Sayyad in At-Tur. Two commercial structures owned by the Abu Riyala family in Isawiya were also razed for lack of an Israeli permit.
- Hassan Ghneim, a school principal in Beit Hanina required hospital treatment for injuries sustained during an Israeli raid on the school grounds where a person they were pursuing drove inside its grounds. Ghneim is said to have intervened when one of his pupils was struck by a police car, and to have been assaulted thereupon by police.

=== 5 May ===
- Israeli forces demolished the home of Ashraf Fawaqa Amid in Sur Baher. 6 Palestinians were left homeless. Applications by the owner to obtain a permit over the last six years, including paying some $56,000 in lawyers’ fees, had failed to secure a permit.

=== 7 May ===
- Fatima Afif Abd al-Rahman Hjeiji (17) of Qarawat Bani Zeid was shot dead near Damascus Gate in what Israeli police claim was a knifing attempt, undertaken as she yelled ‘God is great’. The police also published a farewell note to her family containing verses from the Qur’an, countersigned with the word for ‘martyr’. A Palestinian eyewitness stated she was shot multiple times by approximately 5 policemen from a distance of about 10 metres. She had been detained for an alleged knifing attempt a year earlier at Zaatari checkpoint in Nablus. A report by B'tselem found that she stopped and brandished a knife, but posed no threat to the Israeli officers who had protective gear and stood behind a metal barrier several metres away. At least 10 bullets were fired at her.

=== 12 May ===
- 1 Palestinian was shot by Israeli live fire and a further 16 injured by rubber-coated steel bullets while demonstrating on behalf of detained prisoners, during a march to the Beita junction and Beit Furik checkpoint. The incident arose during clashes with Israeli soldiers. Three Red Crescent ambulances were also fired on and had their windows shattered.
- Saba Abu Ubeid (23) of Nabi Salih was shot in the chest with live ammunition by Israeli forces and later declared dead. The incident occurred during clashes that arose as the villagers made their weekly protest march. Israeli sources say soldiers found themselves before an ‘immediate threat’ when stones were thrown.

=== 13 May ===
- Muhammad al-Skaji (57) a Jordanian of Palestinian origin, while travelling on a tourist visa, stabbed and wounded an Israeli policeman, and was shot dead in response.
- A Palestinian police car was damaged when a major driving the vehicle between Nablus and Ramallah was subject to rockthrowing by Israeli settlers in Uyoun al-Haramiyeh area of the West Bank.

=== 15 May ===
- Muhammad Majid Bakr (23) of the al-Shali refugee camp died from a bullet wound to his chest incurred when Israeli naval forces fired on a boat he and his brother were fishing from, when, according to Israeli reports, it deviated from the line within which Israel states fish may be taken off the Gazan coastline. In a follow up investigation B’tselem concluded from local testimonies that the fishermen had been fishing within the limit set by Israel, that they posed no threat and that Bakr had been shot dead near the coastline of Jabaliya after he and other crewmen sighted Israeli gunboats approaching, and fled shorewards.

=== 17 May ===
- Ibrahim Rasem Hamed (19) was shot by an Israeli settler who chased him after Hamed and others had blocked a road and thrown rocks at passing cars. Israeli sources state that the incident took place as the settler was trying to make a citizen's arrest. The Palestinian was put under arrest.
- Wahid Yousif al-Ghoul (20) was shot in the legs during an Israeli raid on the Jenin Refugee Camp, and another unnamed resident was wounded. Israeli police say pipe bombs were thrown their way during the raid.
- According to the Palestinian News Agency Wafa, one Palestinian was injured by Israeli fire during an Israeli raid on the Askar refugee camp.

=== 18 May ===
- Muataz Hussein Hilal Bani Shamsa (23) of the village of Beita was killed, reportedly by a settler from the Israeli settlement of Itamar who fired at a demonstration in Huwara when his car was stopped inside the village. An AP photographer, Majdi Eshtayya, was also wounded in the incident. Driving off he also struck with his car a Palestinian ambulance and 3 Palestinians who suffered minor injuries. Israeli reports say he fired into the air when his car was struck by a rock, and the IDF did not exclude the possibility that the dead Palestinian had been shot by army fire. The settler stated later he saw Palestinians near the car “with murder in their eyes" and that he had shot without aiming at anyone specifically. A video of the incident shows the settler driving through Huwara where the demonstration was underway. His vehicle was surrounded, and as the driver drove forward, the car hit protesters standing in its way. When an ambulance blocked the route, demonstrators kicked the car and threw stones at it. A settler was later caught on video distributing candy to drivers to celebrate the killing of the Palestinian, calling him a ‘vandal’. Israeli police are following up a complaint filed by the settler against the people he claims attacked him.
- Israeli live fire wounded 4 Palestinians, while another 5 suffered injuries from rubber-coated steel bullets when Israeli forces and solidarity marchers from the Qalandiya refugee camp protesting the death of Muataz Bani Shamsa, clashed with Israeli troops at a checkpoint. 3 Palestinians were later detained by Israeli police for throwing stones during the incident, while the ambulance driver, who said he intervened to block the car from injuring bystanders, was arrested and his vehicle confiscated. The settler who shot the Palestinian dead has not, to date, been investigated on any suspicion of criminal behavior.

=== 21 May ===
- Hasan Ahmad Issa (7) was seriously injured after being struck in the head by a high velocity Israeli tear-gas canister at al-Khader, close to Bethlehem.

=== 22 May ===
- An estimated 20 Palestinians were shot by Israeli forces in the West Bank. One Palestinian was shot in the stomach by live Israeli fire, suffering a moderate to serious wound, and 7 others were hit by live fire to their legs, while rubber-coated steel bullets injured a further 10.
- 2 young Palestinian men were wounded by Israeli live fire during clashes that broke out between members of a solidarity marching group at the entrance to the village of Nabi Salih.
- Raed Ahmad Radayda (15) was shot dead after he approached the Israeli Container checkpoint with a knife in his hand. The incident occurred to the northeast of Bethlehem.
- A Palestinian in his mid twenties was injured by an Israeli gunshot to his legs during protests along the border with Israel, near the Bureij refugee camp.

=== 23 May ===
- A Palestinian girl, Tuqua Hammad (17) was shot in the legs outside of Silwad after reportedly throwing stones. She was the sister of Anas Hammad, who was shot dead on 4 December 2015 after ramming his car into a group of Israeli soldiers.
- An Israeli policeman in Netanya sustained minor injuries on allegedly being subject to a stabbing attack by a 43-year-old Palestinian from Tulkarem in the West Bank. The officer shot the assailant, accidentally wounding with shrapnel a woman who was passing by. Israeli reports say he cried ‘God is great’ twice before the assault.
- Khalid Ghamri (16) suffered critical lacerations to the bowel and abdomen from Israeli live fire east of al-Bureij refugee camp in the Gaza Strip. The incident occurred during clashes with Israeli troops regardinga a solidareity march in the vicinity of the border barrier.*

=== 24 May ===
- 2 children from the Aida Refugee Camp were allegedly beaten and then arrested by Israeli police after a raid on the camp. According to the police, they had thrown rocks an hour earlier. The incident occurred as the students were returning from a United Nations Relief and Works Agency (UNRWA) school, where they had just completed their final exams.
- 2 Palestinian vehicles were subject to a price tag assault when unknown persons set fire to them in the northern Israeli town of 'Ara, countersigning the act with graffiti that read 'price tag'.

=== 30 ===
- A 25-year-old man from Gaza was shot by Israeli forces on the beach in the northern Gaza Strip. Israeli spokesmen said he was one of several walking in a buffer zone area towards whom warning shots were fired.

== June ==
=== 2 June ===
- 2 Palestinians in the area of Khan Yunis in the Gaza Strip were shot by Israeli forces.

=== 4 June ===
- A Palestinian was shot in the foot at Khuzaa in the Gaza Strip when clashes broke out with Israeli forces.

=== 7 June ===
- Fadi Ibrahim al-Najjar (25) was shot dead by Israeli live fire. The incident occurred during clashes involving Gazans throwing stones at the Separation Barrier near Khan Yunis. Several other Palestinians were reportedly wounded with by ammunition.

=== 8 July ===
- According to Palestinian sources, an 18-month-old child, Abd al-Rahman Barghouti, who had been affected by tear gas during clashes with Israeli forces on 19 May, died following complications in hospital.
- A Palestinian in Gaza was wounded by Israeli live fire during clashes east of Jabaliya refugee camp.

=== 9 June ===
- Ayed Khamis Jumaa (35) died from a bullet shot to the head during protests that led to clashes with Israeli forces east of Jabaliya refugee camp. 6 other Palestinians were wounded by Israeli live fire during the incident.

=== 16 June ===
- 3 Palestinian assailants armed with guns and knives carried out an attack in two separate incidents that took place near Damascus Gate. An Israeli police woman Hadas Malka (23) was stabbed on Sultan Suleiman street nearby and later died of her wounds. In response, the 3 Palestinians, Adel Hassan Ahmad Ankoush (18), Baraa Ibrahim Saleh Taha (18), and Usama Ahmad Dahdouh (19), all from the West Bank village of Deir Abu Mash'al, were shot dead. 2 Palestinian bystanders were also wounded.

=== 17 June ===
- After locking down the village of Deir Abu Mashaal, Israeli forces clashed with residents as they took measurements of the family houses of the 3 men involved in Friday's incident, scheduling them for demolition. During the raid, two Palestinians were shot in the legs, and a further wounded, all from live ammunition.

=== 20 June ===
- Bahaa Imad Samir al-Hirbawi (23) from the East Jerusalem-area village of Eizariya was shot dead after attempting to stab Israeli soldiers. According to the Israeli army, the incident occurred when he was detected, with a knife in hand, approaching an IDF outpost near the village of a-Ram, not far from Qalandiyah, as he tried to cross its outer fence.

=== June 28 ===
- 23-year-old Iyad Munir Arafat Ghaith from Hebron was shot dead by Israeli undercover forces during a night time raid and weapons search in the city. Israeli spokesmen said they had responded to fire at the time.

== July ==
=== 10 July ===
- A Palestinian boy Nur Hamdan (13) lost an eye when he was hit by a bullet used by Israeli police during clashes with rock throwing youths. His family says he was watching the skirmish from the balcony of their home in East Jerusalem when the incident occurred.
- Muhammad Ibrahim Jibril (24), from Tuqu' attempted to run over a group of soldiers near the West Bank settlement of Tekoa on Monday when his car veered off and crashed into a pole. He then reportedly exited the car and tried stabbing the group, according to the Israeli army. The Palestinian man was shot and killed, and a soldier was moderately wounded.

=== 14 July ===
- A Palestinian youth Baraa Hamamda (18) was killed during an Israeli raid on the al-Duheisha refugee camp Bethlehem, the 43rd killed by Israeli forces since the beginning of the year.
- Some hours later, at 7 am., 3 Palestinian citizens of Israel from Umm al-Fahm, Muhammad Ahmad Muhammad Jabarin (29); Muhammad Hamid Abd al-Latif Jabarin (19) and Muhammad Ahmad Mufdal Jabarin (19), attacked Israeli troops, riding a motorcycle and armed with two Carlo submachine guns, a handgun, and a knife. shot at Israel troops stationed at the Damascus Gate before fleeing towards the Al Aqsa compound on the Haram al Sharif/Temple Mount. 2 Druze police officers, Hail Stawi (30) of Maghar and Kamil Shakib Shinan (22) from Hurfeish were killed, and the 3 Palestinians were then shot dead at the Bab al-Huttah (Gate of Remission).

=== 15 July ===
- Nasser Nael originally of Beitin but now resident in Brazil, came under fire from another Palestinian car while driving his vehicle, with Israeli license plates, between the Israeli settlement of Ateret and Umm Safr.

=== 16 July ===
- Ammar Ahmad Khalil (34) of Kafr Ein was shot dead by Israel forces at Nabi Salih on suspicion of being behind drive-by shootings a day earlier. A second Palestinian youth, also wounded by Israeli fire, was detained and then released.

=== 20 July ===
- According to Israeli army reports, Muhammad Hussein Ahmad Tnouh (26) of Tuqu' in the West Bank was shot dead while endeavouring to stab soldiers manning a military checkpoint in the area. A Palestinian journalist said Israeli troops fired 4 times, while local eyewitnesses claimed an Israeli military vehicle ran the man over after he was shot. When protests broke out, Israeli fire wounded a local Palestinian policeman with a rubber-coated steel bullet.

=== 21 July ===
- According to the Palestinian Red Crescent, over the day in both Jerusalem and the West Bank, an estimated 450 Palestinians suffered injuries in clashes with Israeli forces Of these, 23 were shot with Israeli live fire, 147 with rubber-coated steel bullets and 65 suffered fractures as a result of Israeli police assaults. A further 215 were treated for tear-gas inhalation.
- A Palestinian youth Omar al-Abed (18/19) from the West Bank village of Kobar executed a stabbing attack on a family of settlers at the settlement of Halamish, killing Yosef Salomon (70) his children Chaya (46) and Elad (36), and seriously wounding his wife Tva Salomon (68). A neighbor, shot el-Abed who was then arrested. The murderer motivated his assault with a post on Facebook some time earlier as due to outrage at recent events at the Haram al Sharif, and the murder of Palestinian women and children.
- According to Palestinians sources, Muhammad Mahmoud Sharaf (18) from Silwan died after being shot in the neck by a settler as he participated in demonstrations at Ras al-Amud. Social media later published photos of a settler aiming a rifle at demonstrators from a rooftop in the area.
- Muhammad Abu Ghannam (20) a 2nd year student at Birzeit University, was shot by Israeli forces during clashes at-Tur, and died in hospital. Palestinians took his body from the hospital and buried it secretly to avoid it being confiscated by Israeli police.
- A Palestinian high school student, Muhammad Khalaf Mahmoud Khalaf Lafi (17) died of his wounds after he was shot in the chest by Israeli forces during a demonstration at Abu Dis.

=== 22 July ===
- Yousif Kashur (23) of Abu Dis was shot dead by Israeli forces during clashes at al-Eizariya.
- The Palestinian Red Crescent stated that it had treated 57 Palestinians injured, mainly by rubber-coated steel bullets and sound bombs, during evening clashes in Jerusalem.

=== 23 July ===
- Israeli troops shot a Palestinian driver at the West Bank Hamra checkpoint in the Nablus Governorate after he fled on foot on being stopped for suspicious behavior while driving. He was fleeing on foot after stating he had left his identity documents at home.
- Uday Aziz Khalil Nawajaa (17) was killed when an old Israeli landmine exploded in the Tubas Governorate of the West Bank.
- As multiple reported stated settlers marched in West Bank areas to protest the Hamilish murders, some involving attacks on Palestinians, throwing rocks at Palestinian cars near the Palestinian village of Beitin and the Israeli settlements of Ofra and Shilo, hundreds of residents from Hamalish itself established a new illegal outpost at a junction close to their settlement, blocking with a container Palestinian use of the road, and demanding government approval of an expansion of Hamilish towards Tzofit.

=== 24 July ===
- A Palestinian was shot in the head by Israeli force at Hizma in the West Bank and hospitalized in a critical condition.
- A Palestinian man from the West Bank town of Qalqiliya stabbed an Israeli Palestinian bus driver, and then turned on the wife of the owner of an Israeli restaurant in Petah Tikva. He fled after being hit over the head with a pizza spatula and was later detained. Israeli police are treating the attack, under a gag order, as a terrorist incident.
- 4 students from Birzeit University in the West Bank were shot by Israeli forces during a march towards the Israeli settlement of Beit El while protesting the death of Muhammad Abu Ghannam 3 days earlier .
- According to Palestinian Red Crescent society statistics, in the ten day period from Israel's installation of metal detectors on the Haram al Sharif, roughly 1,090 Palestinians had been injured in clashes with Israeli forces as widespread protests at the measure took place.
- After a rocket was fired from the Gaza Strip into the Negev desert, Israeli forces responded by shelling a Hamas installation near Deir al-Balah.

== August ==
=== 26 August ===
Aseel Tareq Abu ‘Oun, 8, was killed after being struck by an Israeli settlers car near Furush Beit Dajan east of Nablus. The settler was questioned by police and said it was a "regular road accident."

== September ==
=== 26 September ===
- 2017 Har Adar shooting

== See also ==
- House demolition in the Israeli–Palestinian conflict
- Israeli settler violence
- List of Israeli price tag attacks
- Palestinian rocket attacks on Israel
- Palestinian political violence
