= Timeline of the Islamic State (2017) =

This is a timeline of Islamic State-related incidents in 2017.

== Timeline ==
=== January 2017 ===
- 1 January 2017 Istanbul nightclub attack: One gunman killed 39 individuals in a Reina Nightclub in Istanbul during 2016–2017 New Year eve celebrations.
- Islamic State militants attacked a police checkpoint near the southern Iraqi city of Najaf, killing seven policemen and wounding 17 others including civilians.
- Two security officers in Tartous, Syria, were killed in a double suicide bombing after they stopped a pair of suspicious people shortly after midnight on New Year's Eve.
- Iraqi forces continued their advance on 1 January. The military announced that it had captured a part of the Karama district while a federal police officer stated that they had taken near complete control of Intissar and Siha districts, and were clearing the Salam district. CTS linked up with Rapid Response Division during the day at the edge of al-Intissar and al-Quds. Staff Lieutenant General Abdulwahab al-Saadi, a top CTS commander, stated that Iraqi forces had captured more than 60% of east Mosul.
- The Islamic State claimed responsibility for a shooting attack it said killed a Jordanian soldier.
- 2 January January 2017 Baghdad bombings: A series of car bombings in Sadr City and other parts of Baghdad killed at least 70 people and injured more than 100 others.
- Sabah al-Numani, the spokesman of CTS, stated that they were clearing the remaining militants in North Karama. IS meanwhile cut off a strategic road linking Mosul and Baghdad. The group also shelled Shirqat after attacking a military barracks near Baiji and seizing weapons. Per the mayor of Shirqat, they had seized 3 checkpoints on the main road between the city and Baiji. Iraqi authorities later stated that they had regained control of the road.
- The Turkish military stated on 2 January that 22 IS fighters were killed in Turkish and Russian airstrikes on al-Bab, Bzagah and Taduf since the previous day. On 3 January, it stated that 18 IS fighters were killed in airstrikes while Russian jets hit Deir Qaq, located 8 kilometres (5.0 mi) to the southeast of al-Bab. United States Department of Defense spokesman Peter Cook meanwhile stated that it had assisted Turkish forces by providing it with air cover a week earlier, but did not carry out any airstrikes.
- Clashes re-erupted on 2 January 2017 around al-Sharifah and the Tiyas T-4 Airbase, in addition to the Fourth Station. Warplanes later targeted the area around the airbase later in the day. Clashes continued over the next several days.
- 3 January Gunmen wearing suicide vests attacked two police stations in the central Iraqi city of Samarra, killing at least 7 policemen.
- 4 January Three girl suicide bombers were killed while attempting to detonate their vests at market in the northeastern Nigerian city of Madagali. Local officials blamed Boko Haram for the attempted attack. A double suicide bombing in Madagali killed 57 people in December 2016. Boko Haram (suspected)
- United Nations meanwhile stated that civilian casualties had started increasing as they advanced. The Joint Operations Command later announced that the Federal Police and 9th Division had captured Wahda after heavy clashes, bringing them closer to the city center. It also stated that IS counter-attacks in southeastern Mosul were repelled, resulting in deaths of about 40 militants and destruction of 7 VBIEDs. Iraqi forces also advanced in al-Salam, Palestine, al-Shaimaa, Domiez and Sumer districts amid heavy clashes. The Federal Police meanwhile announced the killing of Abu Marawan al-Hadithi, an IS leader. Lt.-Gen. Ra'ed Shaker also stated that Iraqi forces had cleared al-Wahda, al-Moallemin and Sumer districts and had captured the Mosul-Kirkuk road. The United States Department of Defense and the anti-IS coalition, meanwhile stated that American advisers had entered Mosul along with Iraqi forces.
- It was reported that the planned Syrian Army counteroffensive for retaking Palmyra had been postponed, and it was also reported that IS's nearly month-long offensive on the Tiyas T-4 Airbase had ended, after sustaining heavy casualties and gaining little territory after mid-December 2016. It also stated that IS withdrew from some of the sites they captured in the western Palmyra countryside, with some additional reasons for the IS withdrawal being due to the concurrent SDF offensive on Ar-Raqqah, and IS's ongoing offensive on the enclave of Deir ez-Zor.
- The Turkish military stated that 6 militants were killed by the rebels and TSK and 104 IS targets were destroyed. It also stated that a Turkish soldier was killed and 5 others were injured on the previous day. IS was meanwhile reported to have withdrawn its senior fighters to defend Raqqa and Mosul, leaving less experienced members to defend al-Bab. Turkish President Erdoğan as well as the rebels meanwhile stated that the offensive to capture the town would be finished soon.
- Three female suicide bombers were killed while attempting to detonate their vests at a market in the northeastern Nigerian city of Madagali. Local officials blamed Boko Haram for the attempted attack.
- 5 January A car bombing at a food market in the al-Obeidi area killed 9 people and left 15 others wounded, while after nightfall a suicide car bomber killed 11 and injured 22 near a security checkpoint in Bab al-Muadam. Several smaller attacks around the city killed 7 people and injured 20 others. Islamic State (suspected)
- A car bomb exploded in the coastal city of Jableh, killing 16 people and injuring more than 30 others. Islamic State (suspected)
- Lt.-Gen. Talib Shaghati stated on 5 January that Iraqi forces had captured about 65-70% of east Mosul. The Federal Police announced that 1,700 IS fighters had been killed in the second phase. General Raed Shaker Jawdat stated that the group's headquarters in Nineveh province had been destroyed and Iraqi forces had captured eight districts in the second phase, thus bringing the entire southeastern section of Mosul under their control. He added that they had also captured drone factories, five car bomb manufacturing plants, an electrical plant, a windmill and several schools. Regarding the future actions of Iraqi forces, he stated that all the remaining districts in east Mosul had been surrounded and would be stormed soon.
- The Turkish military stated on 5 January that it had killed 38 IS fighters in airstrikes and shelling.
- Several online activists in Raqqa were subsequently captured, tortured and/or executed. Another two villages and hamlets were captured by SDF on 5 January.
- Iraqi Army along with the local tribes launched a new offensive on 5 January 2017 to capture the remaining areas under IS control in Anbar with the main targets being the towns of Aanah, Rawa and Al-Qaim.
- 6 January A police checkpoint near Tikrit was attacked by suicide bombers and a car bomb. Four police officers and two attackers were killed, while 12 others were injured.
- Five members of the Hazara Shia community were injured when armed assailants opened fire on their vehicle.
- Islamic State militants beheaded an elderly man in Al-Raqqah for allegedly practicing magic and sorcery.
- On 6 January, CTS was reported to have stormed the al-Muthanna district during an overnight raid across the al-Khawsar river. CTS spokesman later stated that IS was driven out of the district and dozens of militants were killed in airstrikes by the anti-IS coalition. This was the first time that Iraqi forces had entered Mosul from the north. They also launched an assault on the Hadbaa apartment complex in the northern front and faced heavy clashes later in the day.
- On 6 January, Syrian Army warplanes destroyed many vehicles belonging to IS. Clashes and shelling took place on 7 January in the area of the Fourth Station, leading to casualties in both sides.
- On 6 January, it stated that 32 IS fighters were killed. Turkish Defence Minister Işık meanwhile stated that the Turkish-backed rebels were fighting street battle against IS in al-Bab but had slowed down their advance in order to avoid civilian casualties.
- SDF captured Qal'at Ja'bar (Ja'bar Castle) from IS on 6 January. Meanwhile, IS was reported to have shifted its 150 prisoners from Tabqa city due to the offensive. SDF later captured 8 villages and 5 hamlets at the Ayn Issa front. On 7 January, SDF captured 5 villages including the strategic Suwaydiya Gharbi and Suwaydiya Saghirah, reaching the outskirts of Tabqa Dam.
- 7 January On 7 January, the Syrian Army recaptured a number of sites from IS south of the Tiyas T-4 Airbase, securing the airbase. It was reported that despite the advances, they had nothing to do with the upcoming Syrian Army counteroffensive for Palmyra, which still did not yet have a date established for its launch.
- Gunmen shot dead at least 9 miners belonging to Afghanistan's Hazara minority after pulling their vehicle over in Baghlan Province. Local officials blamed the Taliban, but the group denied responsibility.
- At least 60 people were killed and 50 others wounded in a car bomb attack at a marketplace in the rebel-held northern town of Azaz.
- Iraqi forces continued their advance on 7 January, coming within several hundred metres of Tigris river. During the day, CTS stated that they had captured the al-Gharfan district (previously known as al-Baath) and had entered Wahda district. The military later announced that they had captured a hospital complex in Wahda. Meanwhile, a spokesman of the anti-IS coalition stated that the group had deliberately damaged the fourth bridge as it Iraqi forces advanced. Staff Lieutenant General Yarallah meanwhile stated that Iraqi forces had captured Al-Salam Hospital, Al-Shifa Hospital and the Faculty of Medicine, a medical college. They also captured IS's command center as well as two prisons. He later stated that CTS had captured Rifaq, Atibaa 1st and Atibaa 2nd districts as well as the Hadbaa residential complex.
- The Turkish military stated on 7 January that 37 IS fighters were killed in Turkish airstrikes while a Turkish soldier was killed in clashes. They also reportedly captured a town and a hill near Bizaah during the day.
- 8 January A large group of militants attacked a Nigerian Army base in Buni Yadi, but were repelled by government forces. At least 5 soldiers and 15 attackers were killed, with an unknown number injured.
- Islamic State claimed responsibility for a pair of suicide car bombings in Baghdad. At least 20 were killed and more than 50 others were injured.
- On 8 January, al-Saadi stated that CTS troops advancing towards Sukkari and Baladiyat districts were attacked by IS from site of a historic hill, but were repelled with the help of coalition warplanes, resulting in the deaths of dozens of militants. The CTS spokesman announced that Iraqi forces had reached the Tigris river for the first time in the offensive, advancing towards the eastern side of the fourth bridge while Brett McGurk, USA's envoy to the anti-IS coalition, stated that ISIL's defences in eastern Mosul were showing signs of collapse.
- 9 January 3 Kurdish were executed by the Islamic State.
- At least 9 or 13 Egyptian security forces have been killed in a car bomb attack in el-Arish.The bombing was followed by a shooting attack by gunmen. A number of security forces have been taken hostage by the assailants.

=== March 2017 ===
- 8 March March 2017 Kabul attack: 4 Islamic State (IS) militants attacked Sardar Mohammad Daud Khan hospital, the largest military hospital in Kabul, killing more than 30 people and injuring more than 50. Afghan Commandos killed all 4 attackers after several hours of fighting.

=== May 2017 ===
- 10 May - Anti-IS forces retake control of Tabqa and the Tabqa Dam from IS in the Battle of Tabqa (2017). The assault had commenced on 22 March.

=== June 2017 ===
- 6 June - The Syrian Democratic Forces (SDF), supported by U.S.-led coalition airstrikes, initiate an offensive on Raqqa from three directions.
- 12 June - IS spokesman Abi al Hassan al Muhajer calls for attacks during Ramadan in various countries, including the U.S., Europe, and the Middle East.
- 13 June - Indonesia's military chief reports IS sleeper cells in nearly all provinces.
- 14 June - IS fighters launch a counter-attack in western Mosul against Iraqi forces.

=== July 2017 ===
- 10 July - Iraqi Prime Minister Haider al-Abadi declares victory over IS in Mosul, marking the end of the extremists' caliphate in Iraq.
- 12 July - Further reports of the death of Abu Bakr al-Baghdadi.
- 15 July – Failed Islamic State–linked plan to bomb an Etihad Airways flight departing Sydney for Abu Dhabi. Brothers Mahmoud and Khaled Khayat in Sydney planted a bomb in luggage belonging to their brother Amer Khayat, using parts sent to them by a fourth brother, Tarek Khayat, from overseas. Amer was found not guilty, he was used as an unwitting proxy, possibly because his brothers disapproved of his drinking and other habits.
- 16 July - IS loses Battle of Mosul.

=== August 2017 ===
- 12 August - A suicide bombing at Quetta targets a Pakistan army truck, killing 15 people including 8 soldiers and wounding 40 others. IS claims responsibility.
- 19 August - The Lebanese army launches an offensive against an Islamic State enclave on the northeast border with Syria, as Hezbollah and the Syrian army launch an assault from the Syrian side of the border. Under a ceasefire agreement, IS forces were allowed to transfer on 29 August to an IS-controlled area in eastern Syria, but the evacuation of about 300 IS fighters and 300 family members was stopped by Coalition air strikes.

=== September 2017 ===
- 27 September - Russian airstrikes targeted IS positions in Syria's Deir ez-Zor province, resulting in the deaths of several IS commanders.
- 28 September - IS claims al-Baghdadi is still alive, as purported audio recording from him is published.

=== October 2017 ===
- 2 October – At least 17 people were killed in suicide bombings that targeted a police station in the Al-Midan neighborhood of Damascus. IS claimed responsibility for the incident.
- 4 October – Gunmen killed at least four people and wounded 39 in a suicide attack on a court complex in the Libyan city of Misurata.
- 11 October - Coalition military forces conduct 31 airstrikes consisting of 39 engagements against IS targets in Syria and Iraq.
- 16 October – IS militants attacked the villages Makha and Twelha in north of Kirkuk.
- 17 October – The Syrian Democratic Forces capture the city of Raqqa, concluding the Second Battle of Raqqa, which began on 6 June.
- 23 October - Syrian government forces launch an offensive to reach Abu Kamal, one of the last IS strongholds near the Iraq-Syria border.

=== November 2017 ===
- 3 November - The Syrian government announced that Deir ez-Zor, IS's last major city in Syria, was recaptured.
- 10 November -
  - In Syria, strikes near Abu Kamal and Dayr Az Zawr engage IS tactical units and destroy vehicles and fighting positions.
  - In Iraq, operations near Al Qaim, Hawijah, and Rawah target IS units, resulting in the destruction of buildings, weapons caches, and supply routes.
- 17 November - Iraqi forces recapture Rawa, the last town held by IS in Iraq.
- 20 November -
  - Near Abu Kamal, strikes engage IS tactical units and destroy vehicles.
  - In Iraq, operations near Al Qaim, Qayyarah, and Rawah result in the destruction of IS vehicles, tunnels, and bunkers.

=== December 2017 ===
- 9 December - Iraqi Prime Minister Haider al-Abadi declares final victory over the Islamic State after Iraqi forces drove the last remnants of the group from the country, three years after the militants captured about a third of Iraq's territory.
- 11 December - Coalition military forces conduct 14 strikes consisting of 27 engagements against ISIS terrorists in Syria and Iraq. In Syria, near Abu Kamal, eight strikes engage ISIS tactical units and destroy multiple targets, including fighting positions and a mortar system.
- 14 December - Near Abu Kamal, nine strikes engage ISIS tactical units and destroy vehicles and a fighting position.
- 15 December - Coalition military forces conduct 42 strikes consisting of 53 engagements against ISIS terrorists in Syria and Iraq.
