= 2017 Jerusalem Light Rail stabbing =

Terrorist attack in Israel on 14 April 2017

- Part of the Israeli–Palestinian conflict
- The attack site
- Location: 31°46′44″N 35°13′29″E; Tzahal Square, Jerusalem
- Date: 14 April 2017; 9 years ago 12:50 (UTC+3)
- Attack type: Stabbing
- Weapon: Kitchen knife
- Deaths: 1 civilian
- Injuries: 2 civilians
- Victim: Train passengers
- Motive: Under investigation

The 2017 Jerusalem Light Rail stabbing was a stabbing attack and suspected act of terrorism that occurred on Good Friday, 14 April 2017, on Jerusalem Light Rail's car. In the attack, a 20 year old British student was stabbed to death by Jamil Tamimi, a Palestinian man. Two others, including a pregnant woman, were injured in the incident. The attacker was arrested and was deemed competent to stand trial.

== Background ==
Stabbing attacks were rare in Israel in 2017, although there was a spate of them in the fall of 2015 and early 2016. The attack took place as crowds of pilgrims from around Israel and the world gathered in the center of Jerusalem to celebrate Passover and Good Friday.

== Attack ==
The attack occurred at about 1:00 pm 14 April 2017, as a knife-wielding man stabbed a 21 year old British exchange student. An off-duty police officer riding the light rail pulled an emergency brake and tackled the perpetrator, who was then arrested.

According to Israel's domestic security service, Shin Bet, the attacker was known to the authorities and the attack may have also involved a "suicide by soldier" motivation, as attributed to other incidents in the last 18 months, "This is yet another case of a Palestinian suffering from personal, mental or moral distress choosing to commit an act of terror to escape his problems."

After his arrest, the perpetrator reportedly told investigators that he stabbed Bladon because he wanted the soldier standing beside her to kill him.

=== Victim ===
Hannah Bladon, a 20-year-old religion, theology and archaeology student in Israel on an exchange program from the University of Birmingham was fatally injured and died in ambulance en route to Hadassah Medical Center. She had been returning from volunteering in an Israel Antiquities Authority archaeological excavation in the Western Wall Tunnel, and was standing next to the attacker after giving up her seat for a woman with a baby.

=== Suspect ===
The accused, Jamil Tamimi (57) a Palestinian Arab from the Ras al-Amud neighborhood of East Jerusalem who was known to security services; according to security services the accused was convicted of molesting his daughter in 2011. The accused had been admitted in the past to Kfar Shaul Mental Health Center, and a day before the attack he voluntarily admitted himself to a mental health treatment center in northern Israel from which he was expelled following a violent assault on a person. On the morning of the attack he spoke to one of his sons who told him that the entire family wanted no contacted with him. He reportedly told investigators he had "nothing left to lose", and that he had purchased a knife in the Old City, before boarding a train close to Damascus Gate. Following the attack, the accused was sent for a mental examination by a psychiatrist. Psychiatric examiners judged him mentally fit to stand trial, and he was subsequently charged with premeditated murder.

==== Trial and sentencing ====
Tamimi confessed to having committed the murder, acknowledged his mental illness, apologized, and entered a plea-bargain under which he will serve 18 years in prison. Hanna Bladon's family was "outraged" by the lenient sentence, arguing that the murderer ought to have been incarcerated for life. In January 2019, the Jerusalem District Court formally sentenced him to 18 years in prison.

On 26 January 2022, Tamimi was found dead in his cell at the Nitzan Prison.

== Impact ==
In response to this and other recent lone wolf attack, Israeli police have revamped their anti-terrorism tactics, increasing monitoring of social media, improving the intercommunication of mobile devices, and giving security agencies to instantly trace phone calls made such devices.

== Response ==
- Prime Minister of Israel Benjamin Netanyahu said: "Radical Islamic terrorism is striking world capitals. Regretfully, terrorism struck today in Israel's capital – Jerusalem."
- Israeli President Reuven Rivlin said "The bitter news of the young woman’s death in a terror attack in Jerusalem fills me with deep sorrow."
- Mark Regev Israeli ambassador to the UK, said "My thoughts are with the family and friends of UK student Hannah Bladon, who was murdered in a senseless act of terror in Jerusalem today.".
- A spokesman for the Hebrew University condemned "such acts of terror that harm innocent people, and especially a student who came to Jerusalem to study and widen her academic horizons."
- Right Revd Dr Michael Ipgrave, Bishop of Lichfield, expressed "deep sadness," over the killing.
- A moment of silence was held in a Derby County F.C. game and a Burton Albion F.C. game.
- Justin Welby, Archbishops of Canterbury, visited Jerusalem shortly after this incident, in the company of Ephraim Mirvis, Chief Rabbi of Great Britain and the Commonwealth. Together they visited Hebrew University to honor Bladon.

== See also ==
- List of terrorist incidents in April 2017
- List of violent incidents in the Israeli–Palestinian conflict, 2017
