= Jerusalem Waqf =

Islamic religious trust for the Al-Aqsa Mosque

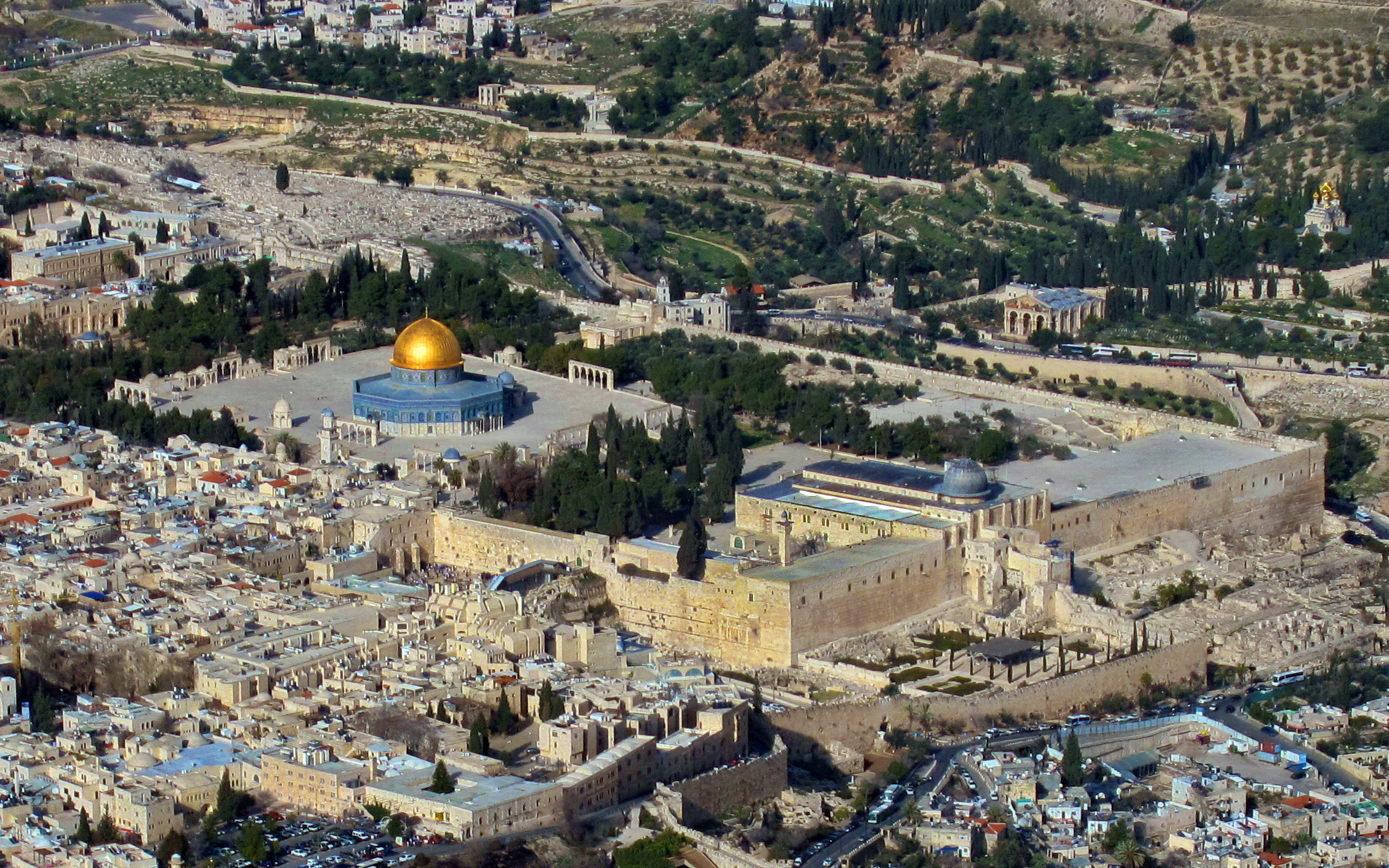
The Al-Aqsa area in East Jerusalem, with the golden Dome of the Rock

The Jerusalem Waqf and Al-Aqsa Mosque Affairs Department, (Note: Arabic: دائرة أوقاف القدس وشؤون المسجد الأقصى, romanized: Dā’irat Awqāf al-Quds wa Shu’ūn al-Masjid al-Aqṣā; Arabic pronunciation: [/ˈdaːʔɪræt ʔawˈqɑːf alˈquːd͡s wæ ʃuːˈʔuːn alˈmæsd͡ʒɪd ælˈʔɑqsˤɑ/]; Hebrew: המחלקה לענייני הווקף ירושלים ומסגד אל-אקצא, romanized: Ha-maḥlaqah le-‘inyanei ha-Waqf Yerushalayim u-Masjid al-Aqṣā) also known as the Jerusalem Waqf, the Jordanian Waqf, or simply the Waqf, is the Jordanian-appointed organization responsible for controlling and managing the current Islamic edifices on the Al-Aqsa mosque compound, located on top of the Temple Mount, in the Old City of Jerusalem, which includes the Dome of the Rock.

The Jerusalem Waqf is guided by a council composed of 18 members and headed by a director, all appointed by Jordan. The current director of the Waqf, since 2005, is Sheikh Azzam al-Khatib.

== Name and history ==
In Islamic law, a waqf (Arabic: وَقْف; [ˈwɑqf]), plural awqaf, is an inalienable endowment – typically a building, plot of land or another property that has been dedicated for Muslim religious or charitable purposes. In Ottoman Turkish law, and later under the British Mandate of Palestine, a waqf was defined as usufruct state land (or property) from which the state revenues were assured to religious foundations. The Al-Aqsa Mosque compound in Jerusalem has been administered as a waqf since the Muslim reconquest of the Kingdom of Jerusalem in 1187. By metonymy, the foundation that administers the waqf of Jerusalem has itself come to be known as "the Waqf".

The current version of the Jerusalem Waqf administration was instituted by the Hashemite Kingdom of Jordan after its occupation of the West Bank, including East Jerusalem, during the 1948 Palestine war. Following Israel's capture of the Old City of Jerusalem during the Six-Day War in June 1967, the Jerusalem Waqf remained under Jordanian control, but access to the site was transferred to Israel. As part of the Israel–Jordan peace treaty signed between Israel and Jordan in 1994, many religious sites in Jerusalem, including the Al-Aqsa Mosque, were transferred back to the Jerusalem Foundation.

== Current ==
The Jerusalem Waqf is an organ of the Jordanian Ministry of Awqaf Islamic Affairs and Holy Places, which is charged with "implementing the Hashemite custodianship over Islamic and Christian holy sites and endowments and consolidating the historical and legal status quo."

The staff members of the Jerusalem Waqf are Jordanian government employees. It is headed by a director, also picked by the Jordanian government. The current director of the Jerusalem Waqf is Sheikh Azzam al-Khatib, appointed in 2005.

An agreement signed in 2013 between the State of Palestine (represented by Mahmoud Abbas) and Jordan's King Abdullah II recognized Jordan's role in managing the Jerusalem holy sites. This agreement replaced a decades-old verbal agreement.

The Jerusalem Waqf is responsible for administrative matters in the Al-Aqsa Mosque compound. Religious authority on the site, on the other hand, is the responsibility of the Grand Mufti of Jerusalem, appointed by the government of the State of Palestine.

When Israel recaptured the eastern half of Jerusalem in 1967, they made an agreement to allow the Waqf to retain control of the Temple Mount. Because the Waqf considers non-Muslim prayers an affront to Islam, they forbid non-Muslims to recite prayers on the Temple Mount.

In 2017, Jordan enlarged the Waqf's council from 11 members to 18. For the first time, Palestinian officials and religious leaders were installed in the body, which had historically been made up of individuals close to the Jordanian monarchy.

== Controversies ==
The Waqf have been frequently accused of the careless destruction of cultural artefacts below the Temple Mount. It has been referred to by archaeologists and scholars as deliberately trying to obliterate evidence of Jewish history. Israel's Supreme Court has held that the Waqf damaged and destroyed important archaeological remains on the Temple Mount in Jerusalem.

== See also ==
- Custodian of the Two Holy Mosques
- Fischer-Chauvel Agreement
- Hashemite custodianship of Jerusalem holy sites
- Status Quo (Jerusalem and Bethlehem)
