= Jerusalem attack =

Jerusalem attack may refer to:

- 1947 Jerusalem riots
- 1969 PFLP bombings in Jerusalem
- 1989 Tel Aviv–Jerusalem bus 405 suicide attack
- 2008 Jerusalem bulldozer attack
- 2008 Jerusalem BMW attack
- 2011 Jerusalem bus stop bombing
- 2014 Jerusalem synagogue attack
- 2014 Jerusalem unrest
- August 2014 Jerusalem tractor attack
- October 2014 Jerusalem vehicular attack
- November 2014 Jerusalem vehicular attack
- 2015 Jerusalem bus attack
- 2016 Jerusalem bus bombing
- 2016 Jerusalem shooting attack
- 2017 Jerusalem Light Rail stabbing
- 2017 Jerusalem truck attack
- June 2017 Jerusalem attack
- 2017 Temple Mount shooting
- 2021 Jerusalem shooting
- 2022 Jerusalem bombings
- 2023 East Jerusalem synagogue shooting
- 2023 Givat Shaul shooting

== See also ==
- Siege of Jerusalem (disambiguation)
- Jerusalem shooting (disambiguation)
