= Jerusalem shooting =

Jerusalem shooting can refer to:

- 1956 Ramat Rachel shooting attack
- 2016 Jerusalem shooting
- 2017 Temple Mount shooting
- 2021 Jerusalem shooting

== See also ==
- Jerusalem attack (disambiguation)
