= Jerusalem bus attack =

Jerusalem bus attack may refer to:

- Tel Aviv–Jerusalem bus 405 suicide attack, 6 July 1989
- 2015 Jerusalem bus attack, 13 October 2015

== See also ==
- Jerusalem attack (disambiguation)
