= 2016 Tel Aviv shooting =

The 2016 Tel Aviv shooting may refer to one of two mass shootings that occurred in Tel Aviv in 2016.

- January 2016 Tel Aviv shooting
- June 2016 Tel Aviv shooting
