= June 2016 Tel Aviv shooting =

2016 terrorist attack in Israel

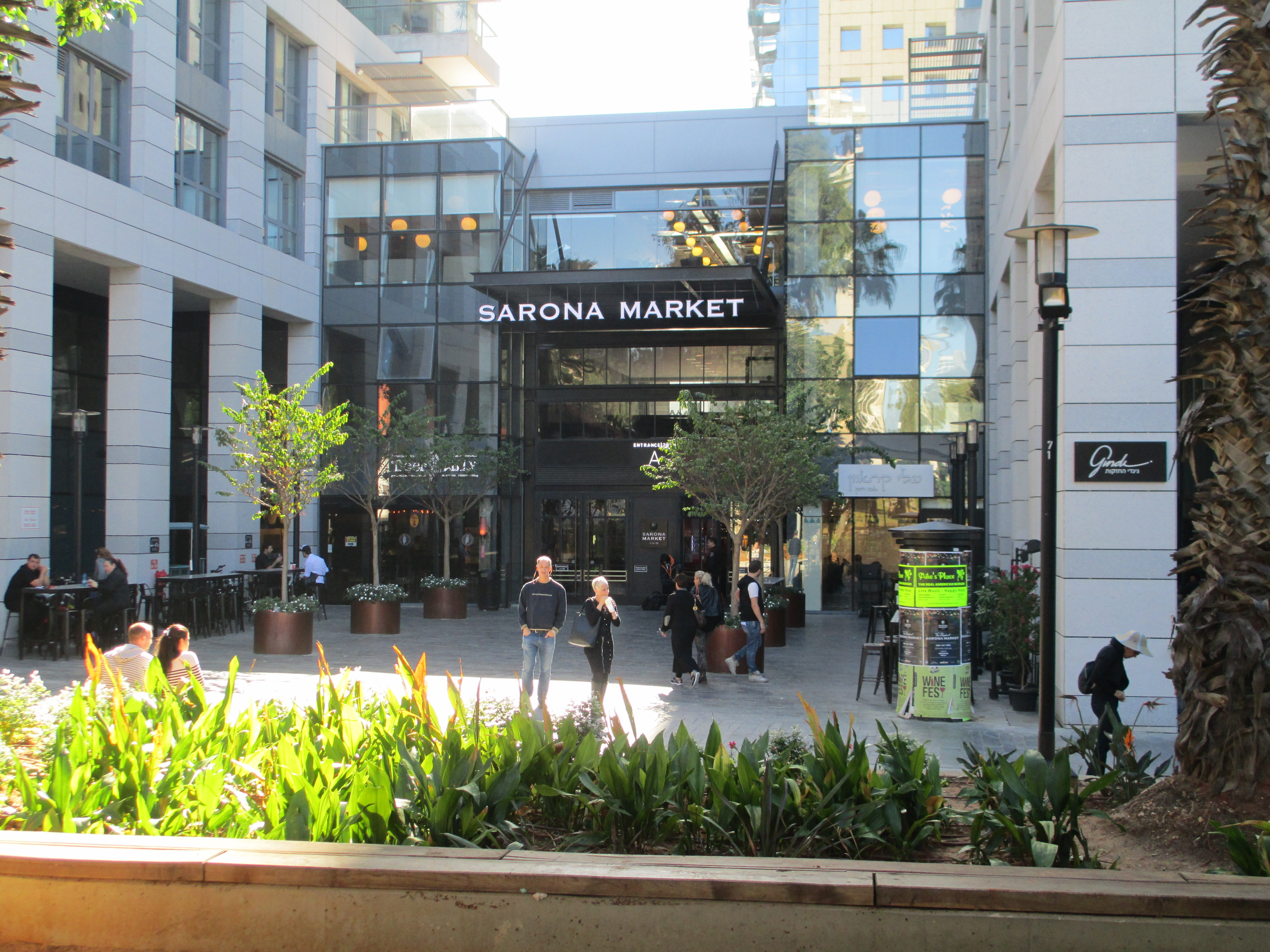
- Sarona Market in 2015

- Location: 32.07243°N 34.78622°E; Sarona Market, Tel Aviv, Israel
- Date: 8 June 2016; 10 years ago 21:26 (IDT)
- Attack type: Mass shooting
- Weapon: improvised "carlo" submachine guns
- Deaths: 4
- Injuries: 7 civilians (+14 shock victims); 1 perpetrator
- Perpetrators: Khalid al-Mahmara and Muhammad Ahmad Moussa Mahmara
- Motive: Disputed (conflicting reports)

In a terrorist attack in Tel Aviv, Israel, on 8 June 2016, two Palestinian gunmen opened fire on patrons at the Max Brenner Cafe at the Sarona Market, killing four people and injuring seven others. The perpetrators were caught alive by the security forces and put in custody. According to an official indictment filed by the Tel Aviv District Prosecutor's Office the perpetrators were "inspired by" the Islamic State group. However, the suspects and their associates were known members of rival groups.

== Background ==
=== Perpetrators ===
The perpetrators, Khalid al-Muhamra and Muhammad Ahmad Moussa Mahmara, cousins belonging to the Makhamra family from the town of Yatta in the Hebron area in the West Bank were both 21. The two did not have any previous criminal record and were arrested by the police following the attack. An investigation by the Israel Security Agency revealed the shooters were influenced by propaganda videos of the Islamic State of Iraq and the Levant, but did not receive aid or instruction or pledge allegiance to the Islamic State. Ayash Musa Zayn, their friend from Yatta helped the two with the planning of the attack and secured their weapons. The two were also assisted by Salim Mognam (23) of Yatta, who helped them infiltrate Israel through a break in the separation barrier.

Khalid al-Muhamra is a Hamas member who studied at the Al-Karak Jordanian military academy, and arrived for Ramadan vacation. His peers said he was an electrical engineering honors student and came from a family associated with Fatah. Muhammad Ahmad Moussa Mahmara was not identified as a member of any group. Hamas said both perpetrators were its members. The father of one perpetrator stated he was surprised by his son's actions. The perpetrators' uncle, Taleb Mahmara, was a member of the militant Tanzim faction of Fatah. He participated in an attack that killed four Israelis south of Hebron in 2002. Taleb is today imprisoned in Israel and his house was demolished after he was arrested.

=== Preparations ===
Muhammad spent a long period of time studying in Jordan in 2015, where he was influenced by ISIL propaganda videos and the decision to carry out the attack was taken after he returned to Yatta in January 2016.

Muhammad and Khalid asked their friend Ayash Musa Zayn from their town to participate in the attack. The three originally planned to attack an Israeli train and gathered information about timetables, journey routes, entrances and exits, gateways and numbers of passengers passing through different stations. Muhammad and Khalid bought 30 cm knives and rat poison to be spread on the knives and maximize the damage caused. They also bought suits, watches, bags, shoes and glasses. The entire cost of their equipment was around 4000 NIS. They were equipped with what appeared to be improvised "carlo" submachine guns to carry out the attack. They went to shooting practice to make sure that their weapons worked and hid them with Ayash along with the ammunition and the rest of their equipment. According to Yedioth Ahronoth, the two prevented Ayash from participating in the attack because, "he had financial debt... which according to Islamic doctrine precludes the possibility of an individual becoming a Sahid (martyr)".

The two were reported missing to the Palestinian Security Services two days before the attack. This did not arouse suspicion since such notifications to the Palestinian authorities are received every day, and the time interval of their absence was short. The day of the attack, the two entered Israel through a break in the West Bank separation barrier and the area of Beit Yatir, south of Yatta. They were helped from Salim Mognam (23) of Yatta. After infiltrating into Israel, they stayed in an apartment in Segev Shalom that is used by illegal residents where they prepared to set out for Tel Aviv. From there, the two travelled to Be'er Sheva on bus line 53. After a few hours of making the final preparations for the attack, the two made their way to the train station but decided to abort the plan due to security checks being conducted at the entrance. At this point, the two boarded a cab and arrived at HaShalom Railway Station where they asked people where they can find popular restaurants or coffee shops and arrived at a Max Brenner dessert restaurant.

== Attack ==
=== Events ===
At 21:04 (UTC+3), on 8 June 2016, two perpetrators dressed in suits and ties arrived at the Max Brenner Cafe in the Sarona Market complex near HaArba'a Street in Tel Aviv. They inspected the area and then sat down on chairs outside, ordering desserts. At 21:27 the perpetrators stood up and fired at the diners until one of the perpetrators' firearms jammed. He slammed the firearm on the floor and the perpetrators started to run away from the site. The perpetrators wounded 11 people. Three were critically wounded, and later succumbed to their wounds, while a fourth - although not directly wounded - died of a heart-attack. Two others were in severe condition, two in moderate condition and four in light condition. An additional 14 people suffering from symptoms of anxiety received medical attention at the scene and at the hospitals. The two did not have an escape plan, an official of the Israel Security Agency said, after investigation, that they "trusted in Allah". The perpetrators fled and split up, and at 21:40, one of the perpetrators was wounded and neutralized after a gunfight with a civil guard of Kol Yisrael and was taken to Ichilov Hospital in serious condition. The other unarmed perpetrator ran in a nearby street, near the Tel Aviv Cinematheque. He encountered an off-duty policeman (who was in plainclothes) and asked him for a glass of water and the unsuspecting policeman invited him into his home with his family. The man then rushed to the scene of the attack, leaving the perpetrator in his home. The family tried to speak to the perpetrator but he did not respond and was stressed. The wife of the policeman said she did not suspect anything and that she thought he was a man who ran from the attack. When the policeman saw the other perpetrator was dressed just like the man he invited into his home, he rushed back to his home and captured the perpetrator who tried to escape. While arresting him, one of the policemen called in to help entered the home with his weapon drawn. When he saw that the perpetrator was already captured, he returned his weapon to its sheath, at which point it discharged a bullet and one of the policemen was wounded from shrapnel.

=== Victims ===
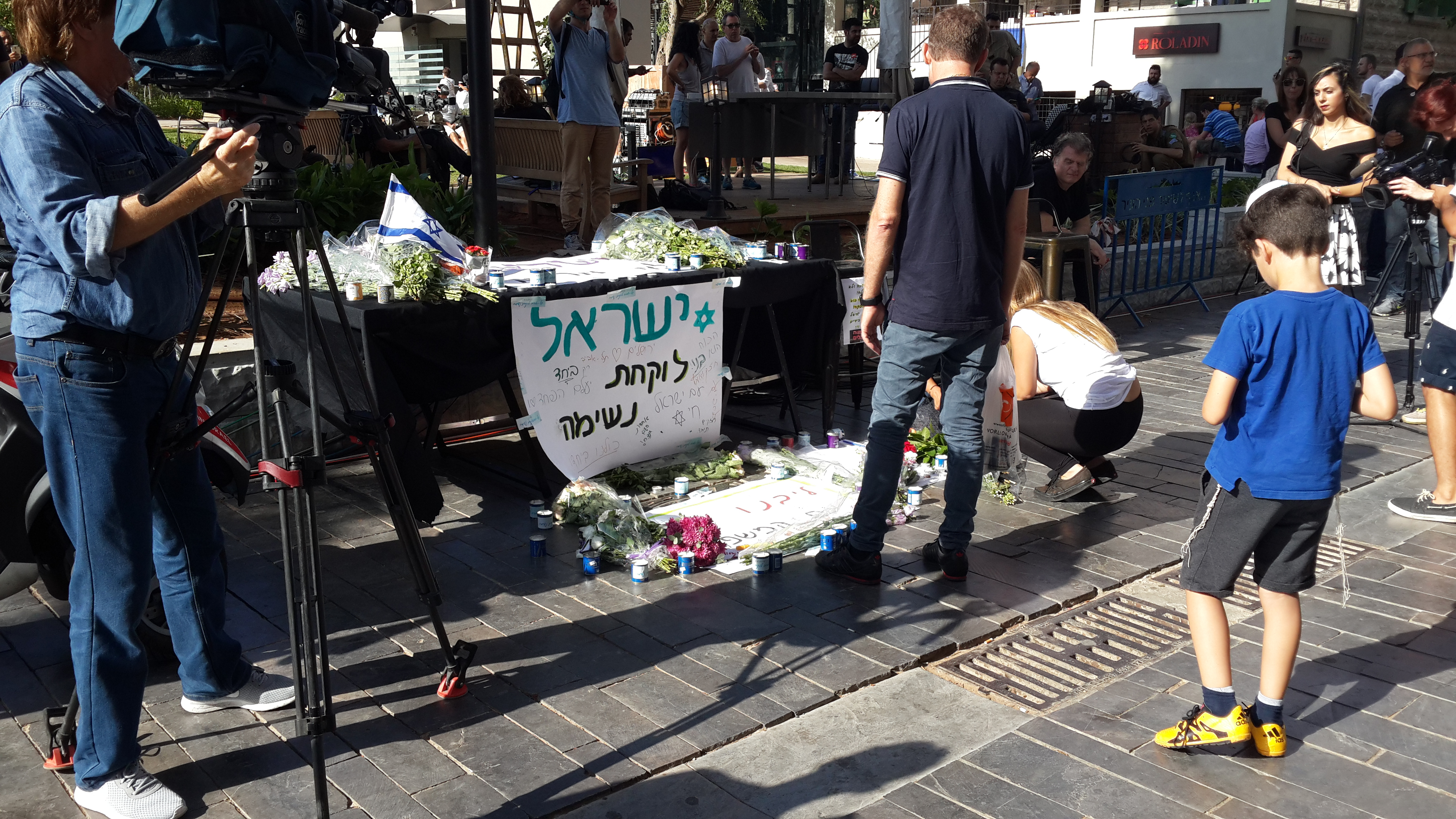
A makeshift monument in memorial of the victims at the site of the attack

Four Israeli citizens were killed as a result of the attack. The victims are:

- Ido Ben-Ari, 42, from Ramat Gan, was a father of two, whose wife was also injured during the attack. A former Sayeret Matkal commando, he worked in a senior position at Coca-Cola's Israel branch.
- Mila Mishayev, 32, from Rishon LeZion, was shot in the leg, but was able to call her fiancé to tell him what happened before dying from the blood loss.
- Ilana Naveh, 39, from Tel Aviv, a mother of four, died of a heart-attack shortly after the attack.
- Michael Feige, 58, from Ramat Gan, a professor at Beersheba's Ben-Gurion University of the Negev who specialized in anthropology and sociology.

== Aftermath ==
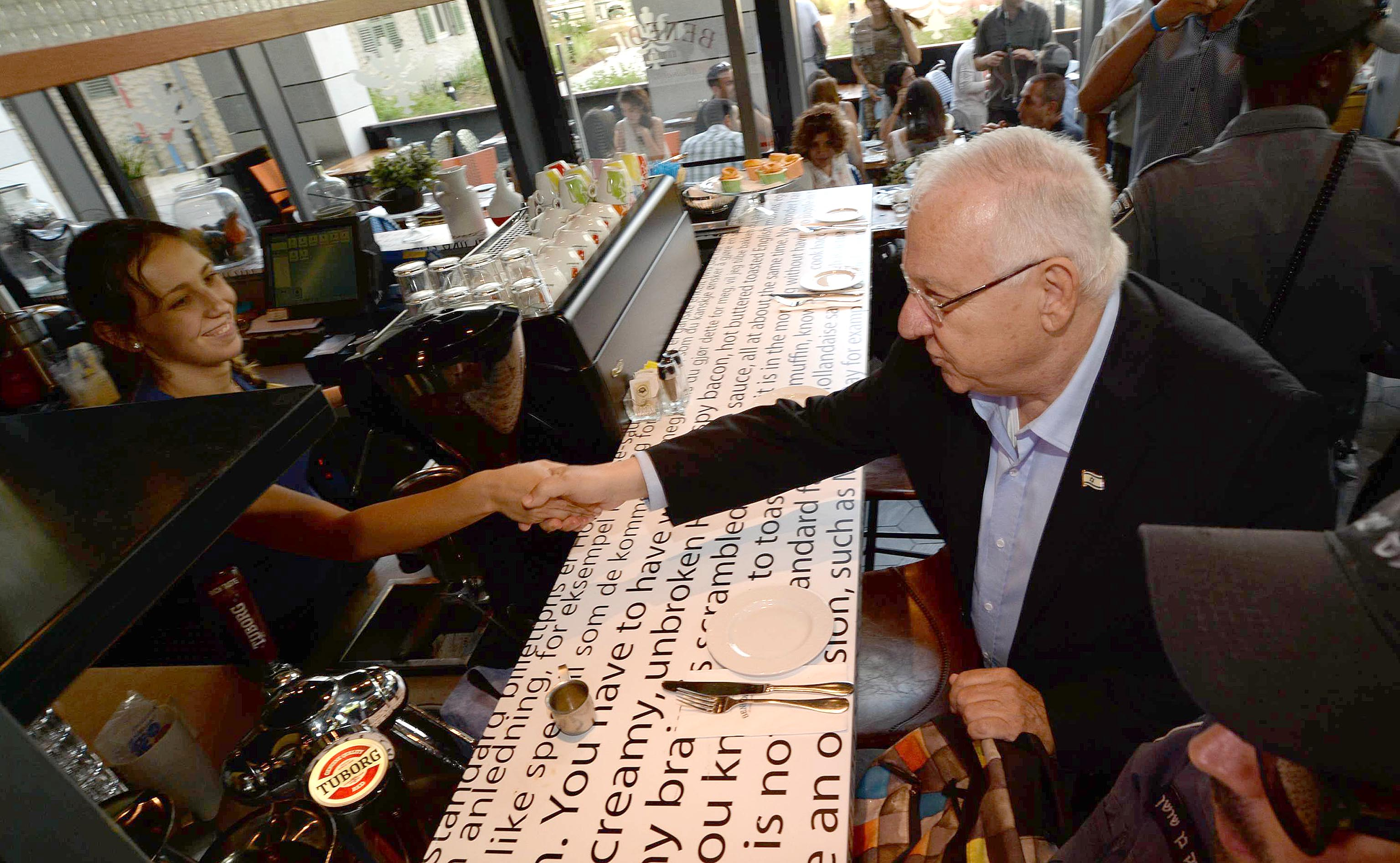
President of Israel, Reuven Rivlin, visit Sarona the morning after the shooting

Prime Minister Benjamin Netanyahu, Defense Minister Avigdor Lieberman and IDF Chief of Staff Gadi Eizenkot said some 83,000 Palestinian entry permits to visit families in Israel for Ramadan were suspended following the attack, a move that was described as "collective punishment" by Knesset member Haneen Zoabi and U.N. High Commissioner for Human Rights Zeid Ra'ad Al Hussein. The IDF imposed a closure over the entire West Bank and the Gaza Strip in the wake of the attack, which was scheduled to end on 11 June after the end of Jewish holiday of Shavuot. The Coordinator of Government Activities in the Territories decided to allow movement in and out of the territories for humanitarian and medical reasons, as well as to allow worshippers to enter Al-Aqsa mosque for Friday prayers except for residents of the Gaza Strip. Lieberman also ordered to halt the practice of returning bodies of other perpetrators of other recent attacks. Erdan proposed to re-establish a cemetery used by Israel during the Second Intifada to bury Palestinian assailants instead of transferring their bodies to their families, an offer Lieberman reportedly supported. Lieberman also demanded to demolish the houses of the perpetrators in 24 hours but Attorney General Avichai Mandelblit said "Israel was governed by the rule of law and that due process took longer than that." The US State department urged Israel to ensure that "any measures it takes are designed to also take into consideration the impact on Palestinian citizens that are trying to go about their daily lives." Police also raided workshops where they believe the guns may have been made.

The Israeli Cabinet stated it would revoke 204 work permits for the al-Makhamra hamula (clan).

The IDF said it would send hundreds of soldiers to the West Bank. They blocked all entrances to the town of Yatta, raided one of the perpetrators' homes, searched the house, interrogated his family members, and mapped out one of perpetrators' houses to prepare it for demolition, and later destroyed it. The blockade of Yatta was the first such action by Israel since the Itamar attack in 2011 and Israeli journalist Ron Ben-Yishai said it is an "effect" of Lieberman's recent appointment as defense minister.

== Reactions ==
=== Israel ===
- Early the next morning, Israeli Prime Minister Benjamin Netanyahu, Defense Minister Avigdor Liberman and Public Security Minister Gilad Erdan visited the scene of the attack, and Netanyahu vowed to respond.
- Ayman Odeh (Hadash), head of the Joint List representing Israel's combined Arab parties, responded to the attack saying: "I condemn and feel the pain of the terrible blow to civilians", continuing by blaming the Israeli government for the "cycle of terror and bloodshed", "we must fight together to bring an end to the occupation and do the right thing for justice and peace for both peoples."

=== Palestinians ===
- Palestinian National Authority: The office of Palestinian President Mahmoud Abbas (Fatah Party) issued a statement saying the Palestinian presidency "reaffirms its rejection of all operations that target civilians from any background regardless of the justifications."
- Fatah, the leading party of the Palestinian Authority and the party of Palestinian president Mahmoud Abbas said in a statement that the Tel Aviv shooting was an "individual and natural response" to Israeli state violence. The media committee head Munir al-Jaghoub said: "Israel must realize the consequences of its persistence to push violence, house demolition policies, forced displacement of Palestinians, raids by Israeli settlers to the Al-Aqsa Mosque compound, and the cold-blooded killing of Palestinians at checkpoints."
- Palestinian Islamic Jihad: Daoud Shihab, said Wednesday night that "the attacks tonight revealed the fragility of Israeli security. These are natural reactions to the crimes of the occupation."
- Hamas praised the attack, releasing a cartoon depicting the attack as a Ramadan treat and suggested more attacks are likely to occur during Ramadan. Fireworks were set off in Gaza and Hebron in celebration of the attack. The United Nations Special Coordinator for the Middle East Peace Process Nickolay Mladenov, issued a statement of shock in response to Hamas' reaction. Initially Hamas claimed that both perpetrators had been Hamas members
- Some Palestinians in East Jerusalem and Tulkarm celebrated the event by handing out candies, while in the Dheisheh Refugee Camp in Bethlehem dozens of Palestinians participated in a march praising the attack. Salma al-Jamal, a Palestinian news anchor working at Al-Jazeera TV, wrote on Twitter: "The Ramadan operation is the best answer to stories about 'peace process' that some people are trying in vain to revive." Palestinian supporters of the terrorist attack in Tel Aviv released posters on Instagram reading "Ramadan brings us together and Tel Aviv is our playground," with the caption: "Operation Ramadan, #CarlosSalvo #Intifada Jerusalem." while other said " "Have a delicious Iftar.""

=== International ===
==== Countries ====
- Canada's Foreign Ministry said in a statement online: "Canada shocked by terror attack in Tel Aviv. Our thoughts are with victims & families and we are monitoring the situation."
- Germany's foreign minister Frank-Walter Steinmeier said in a statement "Murder and terror are completely without justification and cannot be used as an instrument of political disagreement"
- France's President Francois Hollande condemned "with the greatest strength the odious attack" and expressed France's "support for Israel in the fight against terrorism."
- Russia's Foreign Ministry said in a statement: "There are no and can be no justifications of such terrorist acts that seriously complicate a rather difficult atmosphere in the region and obstruct efforts on achieving a fair and stable settlement of the Palestinian-Israeli conflict."
- Spain condemned the attack "in the strongest possible terms" through a statement issued by the Ministry of Foreign Affairs, expressed Spain's "deepest sympathies to the families of the victims and to all the people and authorities of Israel", while conveying its "best wishes for a speedy and full recovery to those injured". The statement also recalled Spain's "full support for Israel in its efforts to guarantee the safety of its citizens from the threat of terrorism".
- United Kingdom ambassador to Israel, David Quarrey, condemned the incident stating there is "no possible justification for terrorism." British Prime Minister David Cameron said on his Twitter account: "I am sickened by the appalling attack in Tel Aviv. We stand with Israel against terrorism and my thoughts are with the victims and families."
- United States State Department, condemned the shooting, called it a "horrific terrorist attack." The department also urged Israel not to use collective punishments against Palestinians. Democratic presidential presumptive nominee Hillary Clinton stated that she stands with Israel, and emphasized her unwavering support. Republican presidential presumptive nominee Donald Trump condemned the attack and "the culture of religious hatred that permeates many Palestinian quarters."

=== Organizations ===
- European Union foreign policy chief Federica Mogherini condemned the attack.
- United Nations Nickolay Mladenov, the UN's Special Coordinator for the Middle East Peace Process, said on Twitter he was "Shocked to see Hamas welcomes Tel Aviv terror attack. Leaders must stand against violence and the incitement that fuels it, not condone it."
- United Nations U.N. High Commissioner for Human Rights Zeid Ra'ad Al Hussein condemned the attack, but also criticized Israel's withdrawal for thousands of Palestinians entry permits which may amount to collective punishment, banned under international law.
- United Nations Secretary-General Ban Ki-moon UN issued a statement condemning Hamas's celebration saying he was "shocked that the leaders of Hamas have chosen to welcome this attack and some have chosen to celebrate it."
- United Nations Spokesperson for the UN High Commissioner for Human Rights Ravina Shamdasani issued a statement: "The High Commissioner condemns the gun attack in Tel Aviv on Wednesday in which four Israelis were killed and a number were injured. This is the largest loss of Israeli life in a single attack since the current surge in violence. We are also deeply concerned at the response of the Israeli authorities, which includes measures that may amount to prohibited collective punishment and will only increase the sense of injustice and frustration felt by Palestinians in this very tense time. The response has included the cancelling of all 83,000 permits granted to West Bank and Gaza residents to travel during Ramadan, the suspension of 204 work permits of individuals in the alleged attackers' extended families, and the sealing off of their entire home town by the Israeli security forces. Israel has a human rights obligation to bring those responsible to account for their crimes. And this it is doing. However the measures taken against the broader population punish not the perpetrators of the crime, but tens – maybe hundreds – of thousands of innocent Palestinians"

== Reporting controversies ==
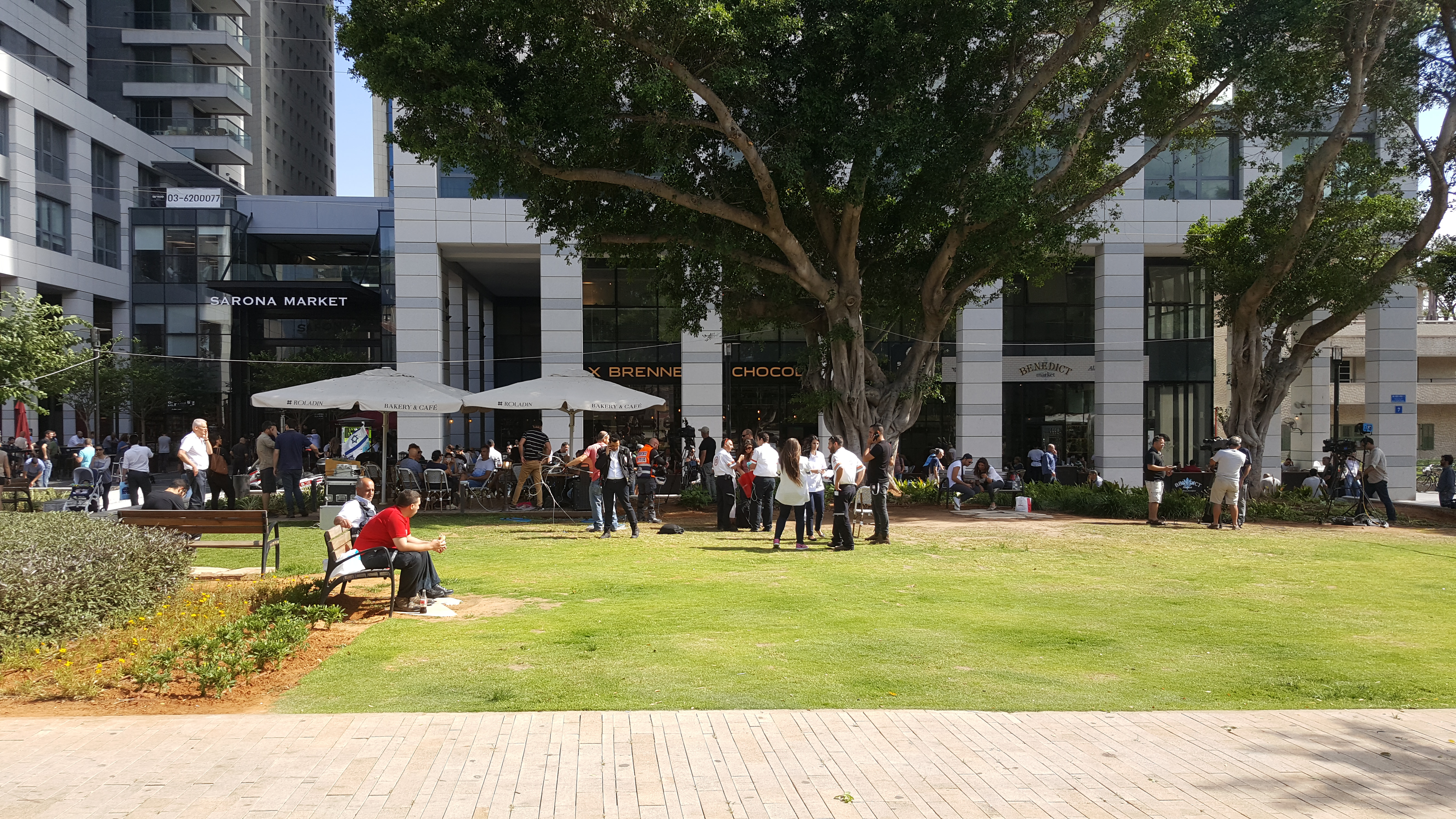
Journalists set up outside of the Max Brenner cafe in Sarona Market, following a shooting in June, 2016

Several Israeli newspapers accused news outlets such as MSNBC, CNN, the BBC of having omitted key facts about the story, such as the Palestinian identity of the perpetrators and some were accused for having given credence to arguments justifying the attack. CNN was criticized by Twitter users for putting the word terrorists in quotation marks, implying that CNN was calling into question whether or not the attackers were terrorists through its use of "scare quotes". CNN later changed the report and apologized, saying "As a result of an editing mistake, an earlier version of this story appeared to call into question whether the Tel Aviv attack was an act of terrorism. It undoubtedly was. The story was corrected."

The BBC was criticized for not mentioning the Palestinian nationality of the perpetrators. Russia Today reported that "two ultra-Orthodox Jewish" gunmen carried out the attack, apparently based on the fact that the gunmen were dressed in black suits. This led to the suspicion that they were trying to disguise themselves as Orthodox Jews, but this theory was later discounted. The Guardian and The Telegraph were criticized for referring to the attack as "shooting incidents".

The Israeli newspaper the Jerusalem Post also criticized MSNBC reporter Ayman Mohyeldin for going "on a rambling, 35 second stream of conscious in which he managed to squeeze in four mentions of 'the occupation' and three mentions of Israeli politics 'shifting to the right' or the 'extreme right,' while talking of Palestinian 'frustration' and Israeli oppression."

== Inspiration by ISIL ==
Following a month-long investigation, the Shin Bet security service announced that the terrorists were inspired by the Islamic State of Iraq and the Levant. Reportedly, this confirmed the assessment, previously made by Palestinian security services on the night of the attack.

Though this was not an ISIL-organized cell, that received instructions or assistance from the group, one of the terrorists had publicly supported the organization when he studied in Jordan, and the two men clearly committed the attack at Sarona Market out of solidarity with the jihadist group, photographing themselves with an ISIL flag in the background before executing the attack.

Following the shooting, Haaretz wrote that first signs emerged of ISIS-inspired lone-wolf terrorism in Israel. A similar explanation was given when Israeli-Arab terrorist Nashat Melhem murdered three Israelis in Tel Aviv on New Year's Day, with the attacker reportedly radicalized by internet sites connected to ISIL.

== Legal proceedings ==
The two perpetrators, as well as an additional man who aided in the preparations but at the last moment decided not to join the attack, were convicted and sentences to four life sentences plus sixty years.

An Israeli Arab was convicted and sentenced for 6 months for harboring the perpetrators the night before the attack.

== See also ==
- List of massacres in Israel
  - January 2016 Tel Aviv shooting
  - 2016 Tel Aviv stabbings
  - 2016 Jerusalem shooting attack
  - Seafood Market attack, Tel Aviv 2002
- List of violent incidents in the Israeli–Palestinian conflict, January–June 2016
- Palestinian political violence
- Timeline of ISIL-related events (2016)
