= Combat Antisemitism Movement =

United States-based NGO

The Combat Antisemitism Movement (CAM) is a United States-based non-governmental organization with a stated goal of eradicating antisemitism. It says it consists of "850 interfaith organizations, influential decision-makers, and a network of more than five million activists and 250 social media influencers". It has been criticized for conflating criticism of Israel with antisemitism.

== Activities ==
CAM was founded in 2019 by Adam Beren in Kansas. CAM advocates for the adoption of the IHRA definition of antisemitism; it has argued that the chant "From the river to the sea, Palestine will be free" is a "violent call to genocide" and sharply criticized the decision of the Meta Oversight Board in 2024 to reject a request that the phrase be systematically removed from posts on the company's social media sites.

According to The Forward in 2021, CAM's partner organizations include "establishment stalwarts like the American Jewish Committee and Jewish Federations of North America as well as several far-right fringe groups focused on attacking Muslims." One partner, the Clarion Project, was previously listed by the Southern Poverty Law Center as an anti-Muslim hate group.

In June 2023, CAM published a video against what it called "woke antisemitism", which led two progressive Jewish organizations, the Jewish Council for Public Affairs and the Jewish Federations of North America, to end their collaboration with CAM.

Following the 2023 October 7 attacks, CAM called for the resignation of United Nations secretary general António Guterres. In March 2024, CAM criticized British Jewish film director Jonathan Glazer, winner of an Oscar for The Zone of Interest, for having denounced the dehumanization of the victims of Israel's assault on Gaza. CAM has accused Francesca Albanese, the UN Special Rapporteur on the occupied Palestinian territories, of "legitimizing terrorism" and promoting "Jew-hatred".

In December 2025, CAM held the North American Mayors Summit Against Antisemitism, a summit in New Orleans. The summit was emceed by pro-Israel media personality Jacki Karsh, and the guest of honor was Eric Adams. Current Affairs, "A glance at the agenda reveals that the mayors’ conference is not really about 'combating antisemitism' at all. This event is about getting city governments to suppress pro-Palestine activism, plain and simple."

After the attempted effort by the copilot to take over Flydubai Flight 1073 in September 2026 on a flight from Dubai to Tel Aviv, monitoring of social media by the Combat Antisemitism Movement and the Antisemitism Research Center showed conspiracy theories being spread as early as 67 minutes after the point where the plane had squawked an emergency signal, with nearly 3,000 posts claiming Jewish or Israeli involvement in the incident being posted in a twelve-hour period after the news was first reported, including more than 4,000 using the term "false flag".

== Criticism ==
The Jewish Council of Australia has characterized CAM as a far-right group. CAM has been accused of conflating criticism of Israel with antisemitism.

== Leadership ==
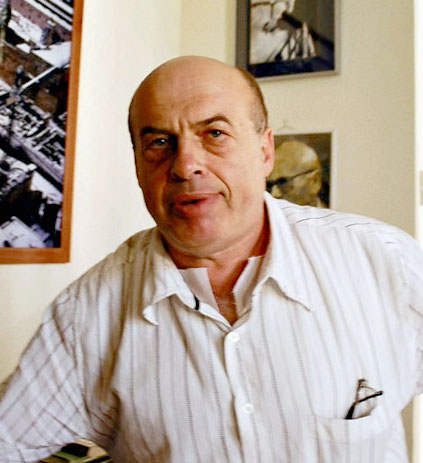
Former Israeli minister Natan Sharansky

The chair of its board is Israeli ex-minister Natan Sharansky. One of its former board members is Sima Vaknin-Gil, brigadier general and former chief censor in the Israel Defense Forces (IDF). CAM CEO Sacha Roytman-Dratwa previously served in the IDF Spokesperson's Unit and its New Media Division, while its editor-in-chief Barney Breen-Portnoy also served in the unit.

== Funding ==
CAM does not disclose its sources of funding. It collaborates with Israeli government-funded organization Voices of Israel (formerly known as Kela Shlomo and Concert) and with the Israeli Ministry of Diaspora Affairs, though the group denies receiving any funds from the Israeli government.

== See also ==
- Institute for the Study of Global Antisemitism and Policy
- Voices of Israel
