= Denial of the October 7 attacks =

Since the October 7 attacks, which initiated the ongoing Gaza war, there has been a spread of conspiracy theories, largely antisemitic and on social media, focused on the argument that the attacks or elements of the attacks were falsified or exaggerated.

== Background ==
On October 7, 2023, Palestinian militant forces led by Hamas coordinated multiple armed incursions from the Gaza Strip into the Gaza envelope of southern Israel, the first invasion of Israeli territory since the 1948 Arab–Israeli War. Following a wave of rocket attacks on Israel, militants breached the Gaza–Israel barrier, attacking Israeli military bases and carrying out multiple massacres of Israelis. In total, 1,139 people were killed in the attacks, and 251 were abducted and taken to the Gaza Strip, beginning a hostage crisis. The course of the attacks was well documented, with militants extensively recording their actions with body cameras.

Nonetheless, various debunked and disputed reports of atrocities during the attacks were described by Haaretz as providing "ammunition" to deniers. Some reported atrocities attributed to Palestinian militants were later proven false, among them the supposed killing or beheading of babies and toddlers. The extent of sexual violence perpetuated by militants, or whether there was a weaponized use of sexual violence at all during the attacks, has also been the subject of intense debate and controversy. Furthermore, according to Ynet, an "immense and complex quantity" of friendly fire incidents occurred during the attacks; Israel also likely applied the Hannibal Directive, resulting in the killing of up to 12 as they were being transported into the Gaza Strip and accidentally killed two other Israeli civilians. However, claims that Israel killed more than 14 Israeli civilians remain without evidence.

== Spread ==
The spreading of falsehoods and misleading narratives that disputed that Hamas was responsible, or claims that minimized the violence that occurred, began to spread after the attack. Common claims are that the Israel Defense Forces (IDF) completely staged the attacks to justify an invasion of the Gaza Strip, and that all or most Israelis killed during the attacks were slain by the IDF itself.

According to the Israeli newspaper Haaretz, malign actors spreading disinformation purposefully decontextualized their reporting to "falsely claim that Haaretz corroborated the false theory that the IDF committed mass killings of its own people". According to Shayan Sardarizadeh, BBC Verify's disinformation expert, the "denialist narrative" that "it was Israel that killed its own civilians on 7 October, not Hamas" has "sadly become prominent online". Some incidents of friendly fire by IDF soldiers and kibbutz security teams against civilians attempting to flee or were captured and taken into Gaza during the attacks were corroborated later.

Researchers see parallels to disinformation surrounding the September 11 attacks, which some fringe groups argue was perpetrated by the Israeli intelligence agency Mossad. Joel Finkelstein of the Network Contagion Research Institute stated that "there's a built-in audience that wants to deny that Jews are the victims of atrocity and further the notion that Jews are secretly behind everything." He said efforts to cast Israel as solely responsible for the October 7 attacks are part of a broader strategy by antisemitic extremists to undermine Jewish suffering.

These claims were found across the Internet, including on the Reddit subforum 'LateStageCapitalism' and on publications critical of Israel such as The Electronic Intifada and The Grayzone. They have also been popularized by right-wing Holocaust deniers, including Owen Benjamin, and far-right conspiracy theorists. The claims are based on cherry-picked evidence to push misleading narratives. A Telegram instant messaging group, which had also shared content and conspiracies relating to foreign policy and the COVID-19 pandemic and had nearly 3,000 people on it in January 2024, pushed content and conspiracies blaming the attack on Israel.

In March 2024, the Israeli firm CyberWell, which uses artificial intelligence (AI) to monitor, analyze and combat antisemitism on social media, reported it had found about 135 separate posts, which had been viewed by more than 15 million users, that denied the October 7 attacks. The company found that almost half of the identified posts were from Twitter, with others posted to Facebook, TikTok, and Instagram.

In January 2026, the British parliamentary standards commissioner opened an investigation into MP Iqbal Mohamed over October 7 denial.

== Responses ==
Hamas has taken full responsibility for its leadership of the October 7 attacks. The group released a report in January 2024 about the attacks titled "Our Narrative", which claims that its armed wing, the al-Qassam Brigades, avoided harming civilians, yet admits "some faults" occurred as a result of the general chaos and rapid collapse of the Israeli defenses.

Emerson Brooking from the Digital Forensic Research Lab at the Atlantic Council compared denial of the October 7 attacks to Holocaust denial. Brooking also stated that extremists will work to attract people who are concerned about the humanitarian crisis in the Gaza Strip towards misleading information and conspiracy theories, and that "a rewriting of history" is occurring. Jennifer V. Evans has also tied the denialism surrounding October 7 to Holocaust denial.

Gideon Levy has compared October 7 denial to Nakba denial, and arguing that many Israelis also deny killings of civilians in the Israeli invasion of the Gaza Strip. Gil Gan-Mor said that denial of both the Nakba and the October 7 attacks must be combated through education.

=== Legislation against denial ===
The Israeli Ministerial Committee for Legislative Affairs approved a bill aimed at penalizing denial of the attacks, imposing up to five years in prison for such acts on February 5, 2024. The bill, which is aimed at individuals who deny the occurrence of the massacre or attempt to justify, praise, or support the acts carried out during the event. The Association of Civil Rights in Israel said the law will have a "chilling effect on freedom of speech".

== See also ==
- Antisemitic trope
- Do you condemn Hamas?
- Khazar myth
- Misinformation in the Gaza war
- Temple denial
