= Voices of Israel =

Israeli government advocacy agency

Voices of Israel Ltd. is a public benefit company, established in 2018 in Tel Aviv, that has the goal of "strengthening the positive perception of the State of Israel and combating hate speech and incitement against the State of Israel worldwide". It is part of a joint venture with the State of Israel. Initially managed by the Ministry of Strategic Affairs, since October 2023 it is under the administration of the Ministry of Diaspora Affairs and Combating Antisemitism.

== Activities ==
Voices of Israel is the continuation of Israel's "mass consciousness activities" carried out under the names Kela Shlomo and Concert - Together for Israel. The latter was a non-profit organization directed by Micah Avni and funded by the Israeli government with 120 million shekel (28 million euros) with the main goal of fighting the Boycott, Divest and Sanctions movement. The largest donor to Kela Shlomo in 2017 was the Central Fund of Israel, a conduit for US taxpayers to make tax-exempt donations to support Israeli settlements in the occupied territories.

In 2021, the Israeli government closed Kela Shlomo / Concert but six months later minister Yair Lapid earmarked another 100 million shekels for it and placed it under deputy foreign minister Idan Roll. Newspaper Haaretz called Concert at the time "the result of [Benjamin] Netanyahu's sick diplomatic logic" and called for it to "be shelved immediately".

Government emails leaked in 2024 revealed that establishing Kela Shlomo as a non-profit was a tactic to avoid having to comply with the US Foreign Agents Registration Act.

The group's funded programs include:

- Leaders of Tomorrow, focused on the United Arab Emirates, Bahrain and Morocco.
- Conexión Israel, focused on Latin America.
- Hasbara Fellowships, a pro-Israel leadership program at more than 80 universities across the United States and Canada.
- European Leadership Network, focused on Europe.

National Black Empowerment Council is a United States partner organization of the group. Some members of Voices of Israel are also part of the leadership team of CyberWell, a pro-Israeli anti-disinformation group, which nevertheless states it "is neither affiliated with nor compensated by Voices for Israel".

== See also ==
- Institute for the Study of Global Antisemitism and Policy
