= Murder of Reuven Shmerling =

Jewish man from Elkana was murdered on October 4, 2017 in Kfar Qasim

On October 4, 2017, Reuven Shmerling (70), a Jewish man from Elkana, was stabbed and bludgeoned to death in a warehouse owned by his son in an industrial zone of the Arab-Israeli city of Kfar Qasim in an attack carried out by two young Palestinian men who had entered Israel illegally. The two attackers wanted to avenge the death of a man from their town who was shot and killed by Israeli police as he was a part of a group of three who killed an Israeli policewoman at Jerusalem's Damascus Gate in February 2016.

== Attack ==
On October 4, 2017, the day prior to the Jewish holiday of Sukkot, the body of Shmerling was found. After Shmerling was unable to be reached by phone, his family decided to go to his work in order to check on him. Shmerling's body was found in a building he owned, by his son, leading police to believe he was killed by one of his Arab employees.

The day following the murder, initial reports suspected that the killing was the result of a monetary dispute, however this was later changed to a suspected terrorist attack. On October 8, 4 days after Shmerling's body was found, two Palestinians from the Arab village of Kabatiya in the West Bank were arrested for the murder. Following the arrest, the Shin Bet stated that details of the attack are under a gag order, however it was being investigated as a terror attack. On October 15, Shmerling was officially declared a victim of terror.

Kamil and Al-Roub claim that they planned and carried out the murder of Shmerling in revenge for a friend, Ahmad Abu Al-Roub, who was killed while attempting to carry out a stabbing attack at the Jalameh Crossing during the 2017 Temple Mount crisis. On November 13, video footage was released of Shmerling arriving at the site, and one of the alleged murderers picking up a pick ax. They entered Israel illegally, and began working without work permits for Reuven Shmerling's son in his warehouse, living at the warehouse where they worked. They purchased a large knife and kept it hidden under their mattress.

On the day of the murder, the two used a ruse to lure Shmerling to the room they lived in. Kamil got behind shmerling and stabbed him with the knife while he tried to defend himself with a chair and Al-Roub attacked him with a chair while Kamil continued to stab the older man with a knife. Kamil filmed the victim lying on the ground in his own blood before the two fled with the help of an accomplice.

Blood identified as belonging to Kamil and Al-Roub was found on the fan and knife used as murder weapons. The two had also posted their intentions on Facebook.

=== Suspects ===
The Palestinian news agency Ma'an News Agency named the two suspects as Youssef Khaled Mustafa Kamil, (20), (alt.: Yousif Khaled Kmai, alt.: Yousef Kmeil), and Mohammed Zeyad Abu al-Rob (19) (alt.: Mohammad Abu al-Rub). On Friday, 6 October, Israeli Defense Forces searched the homes of both suspects in Qabatiya. Following their arrest, both suspects admitted to killing Shmerling, with a pickax, knife and fan. Protests erupted in Qabatiya during the searches of suspects homes. On the night of the 25th, the Israeli military notified the family of Mohammad Abu al-Rub, one of the alleged perpetrators, that their house is slated for demolition. On November 1, additional suspected accomplices were arrested from Qabatiya.

=== Legal proceedings ===
The two suspects were indicted on 29 October in Lod District Court on charges of entering Israel illegally and premeditated murder. The charges read: "The accused caused the death of the deceased with the intention of killing a Jew because he is Jewish, and because they were angry at him for their work conditions," ... "they attacked, stabbed and beat the deceased 70-year-old with a sharp implement, until he laid bleeding on the floor of the room, without moving, and then, in cold blood, showered, changed their clothes, and left the place."

== Victim ==
Shmerling, was married to his wife Chana, was a father of 4, and owned a coal business. Shmerling was a direct descendant of the Alter Rebbe, Shneur Zalman of Liadi. A total of 1,200 people attended his funeral.

On October 15, Shmerling's family was visited by Israel's President Reuven Rivlin. Two days later they were visited by Israeli Arabs, including Kfar Qasim mayor Adel Badir and MK Issawi Frej, and Jewish MK Nissan Slomiansky.

== Related attack ==
The two perpetrators claimed to be avenging a man from their hometown who was killed when he and two other Palestinian men carried out a terrorist attack on 3 February 2016, killing Hadar Cohen (19) of Or Yehuda, an Israeli Magav policewoman. Cohen and two fellow officers approached two Palestinians seated on a bench near the Damascus Gate, and asked for their identity papers. One of the men stood up and stabbed one of the women officers (20) seriously wounding her, and Cohen shot him dead. A second man pulled out an improvised "carlo" submachine gun and starting shooting. A third Palestinian appeared and shot Cohen dead with a bullet to the head. Police in the area opened fire and killed all three. A third man was lightly injured. The three men were Ahmad Rajeh Ismail Zakarneh (20/21), Muhammad Ahmad Hilmi Kamil (20/21), and Najeh Ibrahim Abu al-Rub (alt.: al-Roub) (20/21) from the village of Qabatiya. All three had previously been barred by the Shin Bet from entering Israel. Other munitions and explosives were reportedly found nearby.

== Response ==
Israeli Prime Minister Benjamin Netanyahu wrote on his Facebook page that "we will do everything to bring to justice those who committed this shocking murder."
