= January 2016 Tel Aviv shooting =

2016 terrorist attack in Israel

- The attack site
- Native name: פיגוע הירי ברחוב דיזנגוף (2016)
- Location: 32°04′52″N 34°46′26″E; Dizengoff Street 130, Tel Aviv, Israel
- Date: 1 January 2016; 10 years ago c. 14:40 (UTC+2)
- Attack type: Mass shooting
- Weapon: Spectre M4
- Deaths: 3 civilians
- Injuries: 7 civilians
- Perpetrator: Nasha'at Melhem

On 1 January 2016, an Israeli Arab gunman opened fire on several businesses on Dizengoff Street, Tel Aviv, Israel, killing two and injuring seven civilians. He also killed a taxi driver while fleeing. The attack was believed to be inspired by ISIS. The event took place in parallel with the 2015-16 Palestinian unrest.

== Attack ==
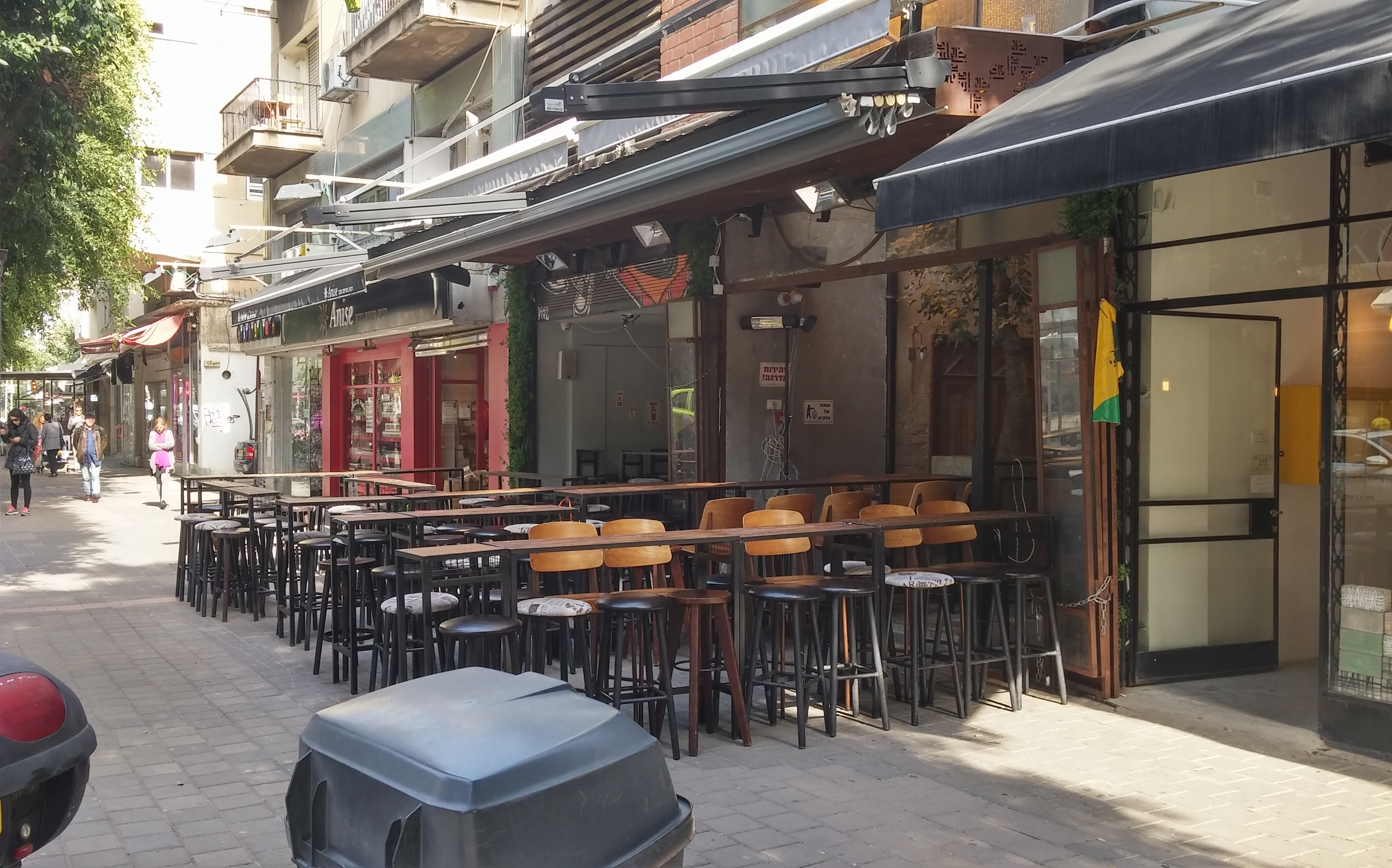
The Simta Bar

The gunman, reported to be a young man wearing sunglasses and dressed in black, exited a grocery store and pulled what appeared to be a submachine gun out of his bag and opened fire on a sushi restaurant, a cafe, and a bar called "Ha'Simta" ("The Alley"), with the bar appearing to be the main target.

Shortly after, the suspect took a taxi at Ibn Gabirol Street near Rabin Square, some 750 meters east of the attack site. He later shot the driver, identified as Arab-Israeli Amin Shaaban, who was found dead near north Tel Aviv's Mandarin Hotel.

The two murdered victims at the site of the shooting were identified as Alon Bakal, the manager of the Simta, and 30-year-old Shimon Ruimi of Ofakim.

The perpetrator's cell phone was found shortly before the attack in an alley in Ramat Aviv, a few miles north of the shooting scene. The girl who found the cell phone did not initially realize that it belonged to the perpetrator, and once she did so a day later, she and her father contacted the police. Selfie videos from his cell phone were later made public by the Shin Bet. The videos led officials to believe that the attack was inspired by ISIS.

=== Suspect ===
Police identified the suspect as a 31-year-old named Nashat Melhem, from Ar'ara, an Arab town in the Wadi Ara area of northern Israel. He was identified after his father, who works in security, recognized his son from the security footage and noticed that his gun, reportedly a Spectre M4, was missing.

Melhem had previously been arrested in 2007 for attempting to steal an Israeli soldier's gun. He attacked the soldier with a screwdriver, and said he wanted to avenge his cousin's death, and also said he wanted to sell the gun. Relatives and acquaintances claimed that he had mental health issues and often engaged in "problematic" behavior. Relatives stated he was not religious or affiliated with any political movement. Videos from his phone, published by Haaretz, show him drinking beer.

== Investigation ==
Immediately following the incident, Israeli forces began a massive manhunt throughout the Tel Aviv area for Melhem. Benjamin Netanyahu following the incident announced that forces have been increased within relevant areas. With the location of Melhem unknown, Israel requested the Palestinian Government's help in searching the West Bank for possible information on his whereabouts, to which they later agreed to turn in Melhem if he was in the West Bank. His family stated that if he returned home they would immediately alert the authorities. After several days, Israeli Police expanded their search to northern Arab towns.

In the days following the shooting, Melhem's father, Mohammed, along with five other family members and friends, were arrested on charges of premeditated manslaughter, being an accessory to murder, illegal association and conspiracy to commit a crime. The next day, Melhem's brother, Jaudat, was released from prison, but ordered not to return home. The Police requested the court to allow Mohammed Melhem to be kept in police custody for up to 12 days. Melhem's mother stated that police threatened to demolish their home for not releasing their son's whereabouts.

On 8 January 2016, an IDF search dog picked up the scent of Melhem's feces. Melhem was then killed by Yamam counter-terrorism operators in a mosque in Ar'ara, following a shootout with the police. Melhem's body was buried in Arara's cemetery on 12 January, with some of the 80 participants, some of which hailed him as a martyr.

Following Melhem being located four additional people were arrested on suspicion of aiding Melhem while in hiding. On 27 January, three of Melhem's relatives: Amin and Mohammed Melhem, and Ayoub Rashid, were indicted for abetting Nashat Melhem elude police. In the indictment, Mohammed Melhem was charged with providing Nasha'at Melhem with a new cell phone and Amin Melhem was charged with helping Nasha'at Melhem plan a second attack in Israel.

=== Alleged ISIS influences ===
According to Shin Bet and the IDF, Melhem was inspired by ISIS. He placed a hand made flag, which Shin Bet described as an ISIS flag, in Ramat Aviv as he escaped. The alleged ISIS flag was a piece of black fabric with "Daesh" (Arabic: داعش) painted above an illegible word. He also had selfie videos on his phone expressing hatred of Christians, Jews, and Shia Muslims in language resembling ISIS propaganda. In March 2016 two Israeli Arabs who lived in central Israel, were indicted for attempting to join ISIS in Syria, and one of them allegedly praised the attack by Melhem.

== See also ==
- 2015–2016 wave of violence in Israeli-Palestinian conflict
- 2016 Jerusalem shooting attack
- 2016 Tel Aviv stabbings
- June 2016 Tel Aviv shooting
- Palestinian political violence
- Timeline of ISIL-related events (2016)
