= Tel Aviv Cinematheque =

Cinematheque in Tel Aviv, Israel

Coordinates: 32°04′15″N 34°47′00″E

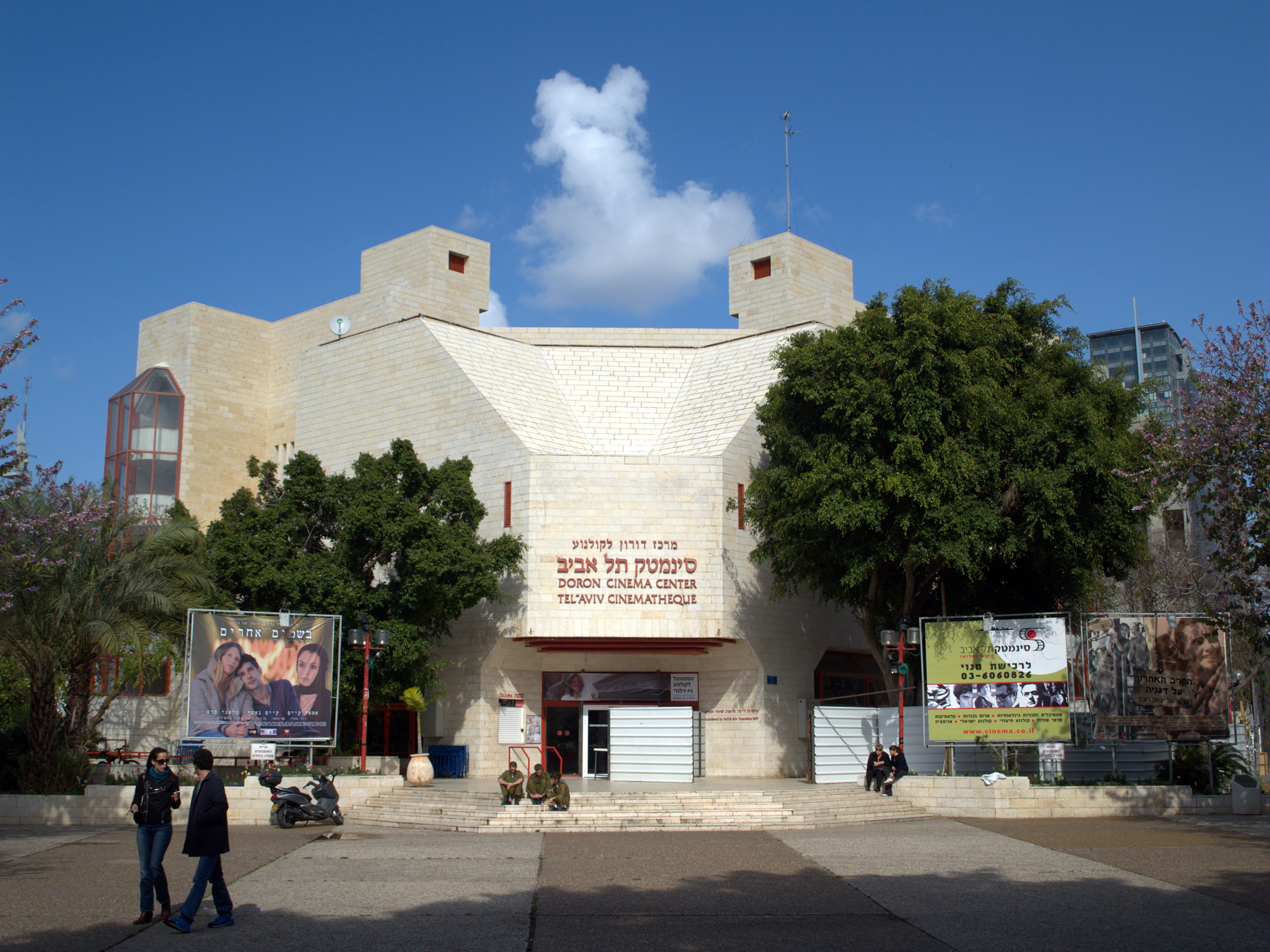
- Interactive map of Tel Aviv Cinematheque
- Address: HaArba'a Street 5 Tel Aviv; Israel

Construction
- Opened: 12 May 1973

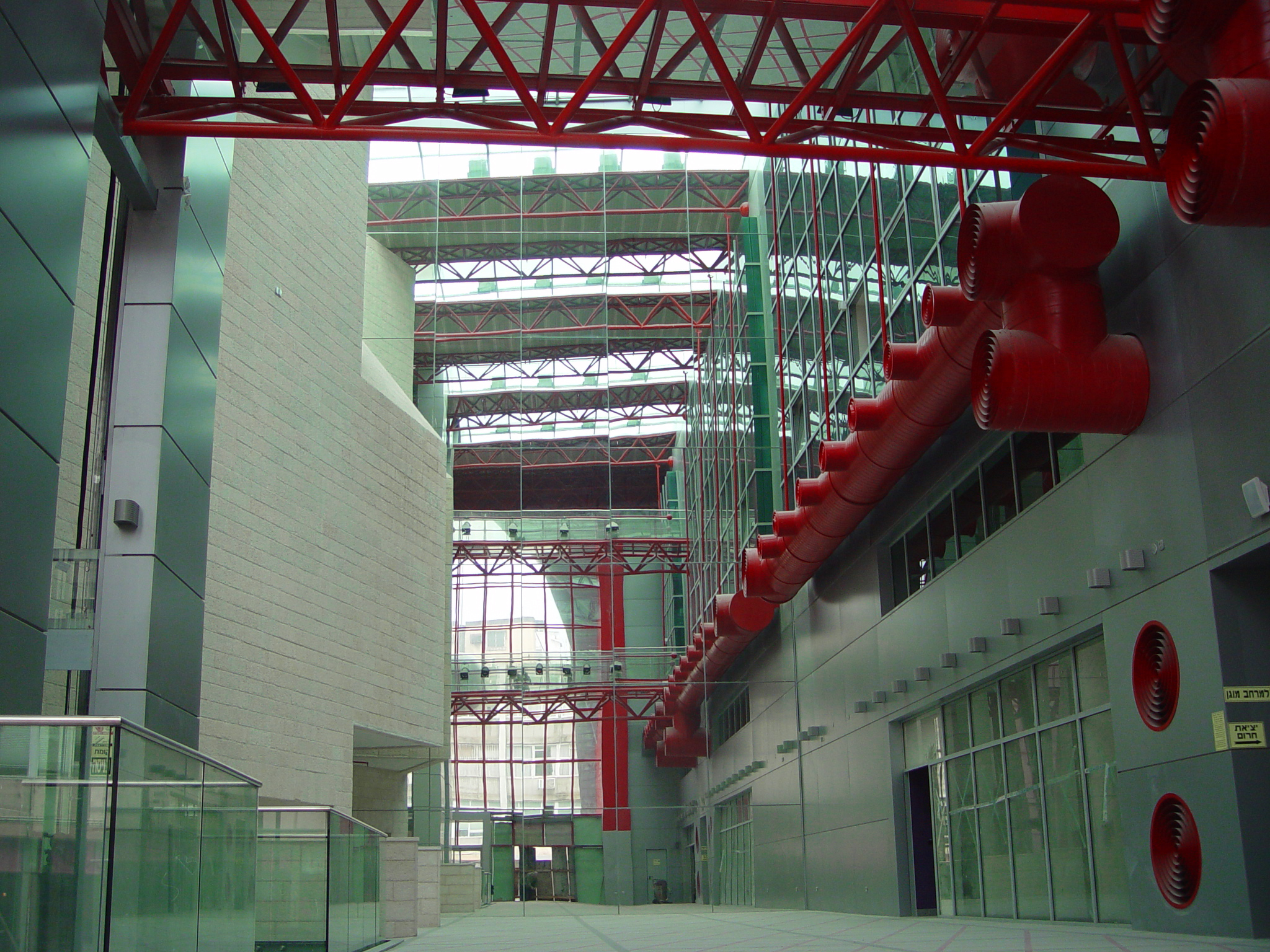
the new building of Israeli Cinema center

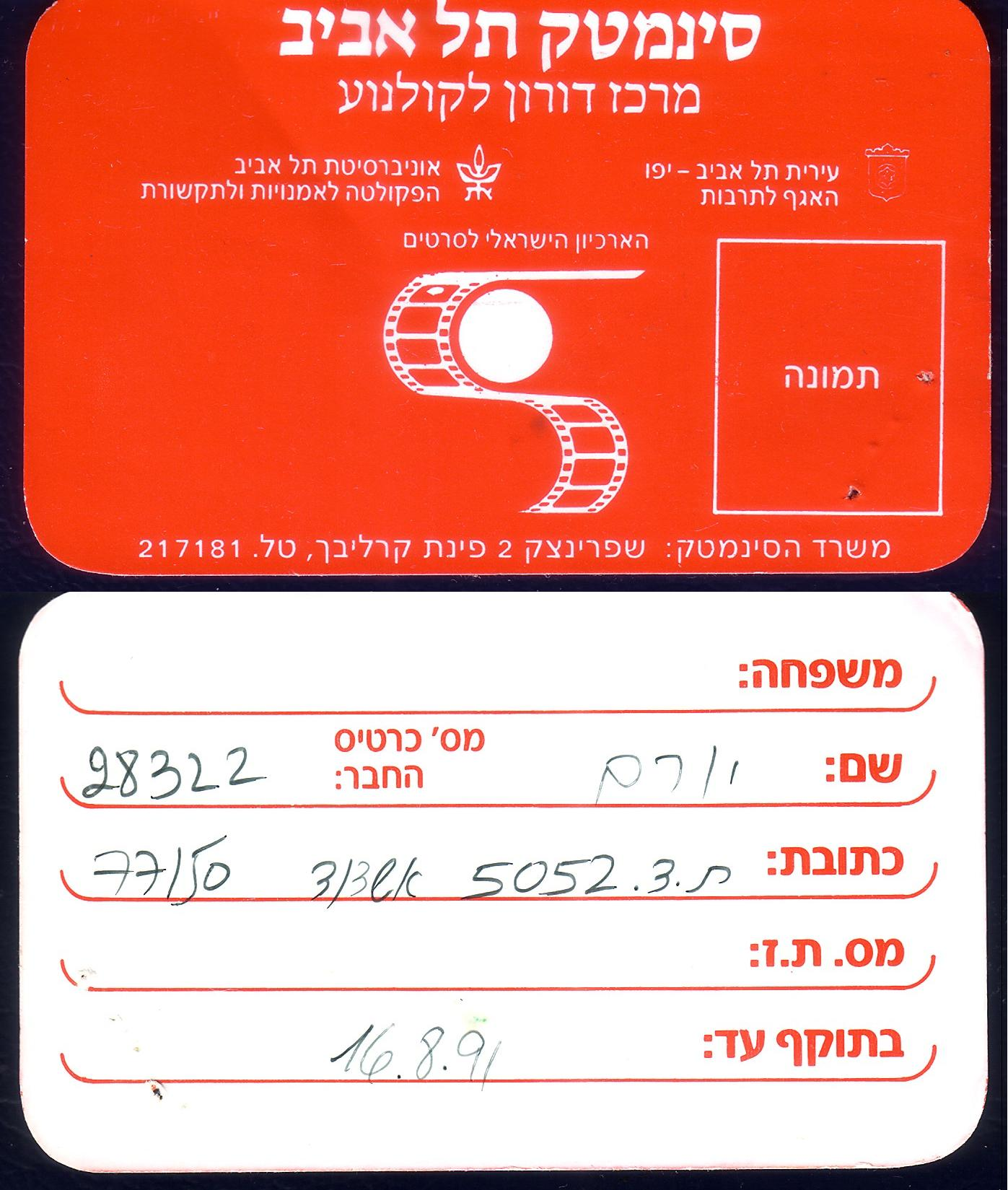
Tel Aviv Cinematheque member card 1990

Tel Aviv Cinematheque (also called: Doron Cinema center) is a cinematheque and movie archive, opened in Tel Aviv on 12 May 1973.

The Cinematheque, located at HaArba'a Street 5, has five screening halls. The Cinematheque programming includes Israeli and foreign films and offers private business screenings to help support the enterprise. Sometimes screenings are held for new Israeli films.

Film festivals held at the cinematheque include TLVFest, "Doc Aviv" Documentary Film Festival, "Moments of French Cinema", an Australian Film Festival and more. The festivals are supported by groups such as the Tel Aviv Museum of Art.

The cinematheque lobby hosts photo exhibitions by Israeli artists. It also publishes a film journal called "Cinematheque".

The current building was designed by Israeli Architect Salo Hershman, and was opened in 1989.

== Israeli Cinema center ==
In September 2011 the Israel Cinema Center opened adjacent to the cinematheque. The new wing is three times the size of the original space and contains three new theaters, offices, a library and a restaurant. Like the original building, the new wing was designed by Salo Hershman.

== See also ==
- Jerusalem Cinematheque
- Haifa Cinematheque
- Art in Tel Aviv
