= 2015 Jerusalem bus attack =

2015 attack on civilians in Jerusalem

- The location of East Talpiot in Jerusalem
- Native name: הפיגוע בקו 78
- Location: East Talpiot, East Jerusalem
- Date: 13 October 2015; 11 years ago
- Attack type: Mass shooting, stabbing attack
- Weapons: Rifle, knife
- Deaths: 3 civilians
- Injuries: 15 civilians
- No. of participants: 2

On 13 October 2015, two Palestinians, armed with a firearm and a knife, boarded the number 78 bus in the Jerusalem neighborhood of East Talpiot. They started attacking and stabbing the passengers and one of the assailants tried to take control on the bus and locked the bus door to prevent the passengers from escaping. Police arrived, killed one of the assailants and neutralized the other. Three civilians were killed and 15 wounded. One of the wounded succumbed to his wounds on 27 October 2015.

== Attack ==
Elian reportedly obtained a gun and a knife in preparation for the attack, in which Gaanam agreed to participate. The two rode a motorbike from Jabel Mukaber, where they lived, to nearby East Talpiot, where they boarded a bus with the weapons concealed in their clothing. They rode the bus until more passengers had boarded, then began the attack. Gaanam shot fellow passengers, while Elian stabbed them. After Gaanam ran out of bullets, he tried to strangle a passenger. Elian was killed by security personnel who rushed to the scene; Gaanam survived.

=== Facebook connection ===
According to Micah Lakin Avni, son of one of the murdered passengers, Richard Lakin, Bahas Alian (Elian) posted a will on Facebook referring to martyrdom. Avni found other Facebook pages exhorting users to kill Jews and showing a chart demonstrating where to stab victims. Following the attack, advocates of Palestinian terrorism posted reenactments of the attack on Facebook. Lakin's son, Micah Avni, a venture capitalist who invests in information technology companies, became an activist campaigning to persuade Facebook not to host pages that advocate terrorism.

=== Trial, convictions, sentencing ===
Balal Abu Gaanam (21), of Jabel Mukaber, was convicted of murder. He had been a supporter of Hamas for several years. He was sentenced to three consecutive life sentences for murder, plus 70 years' imprisonment for seven convictions of attempted murder.

The homes of Elian and Gaanam homes were razed, and the sites sealed off by security forces.

== Victims ==
3 people were killed and 15 civilians were wounded in the attack.

Chaim Haviv, 78 and Alon Govberg, 51, were killed during the attack.

Richard Lakin, 76, was shot in the head, stabbed in the chest, and succumbed to his wounds on October 27. Lakin, who grew up in Newton, Massachusetts, was a civil rights advocate and the principal of the Hopewell Elementary School in Glastonbury, Connecticut before moving to Israel in 1984 with his wife, Karen Gordon Lakin, and their children. Richard and Karen Lakin met as students at Boston University and were Freedom Riders who marched with the Rev. Martin Luther King Jr. After moving to Israel, Lakin taught English to mixed classes of Arabs and Jews.

Hopewell Elementary School erected a memorial plaque in Lakin's honor.

== Impact ==
While Lakin's family was in his hospital room hoping that Lakin would recover, they began to see images of the attack on social media posts urging viewers to carry out similar attacks, in the words of Lakin's son, Micah Avni, the posts included, “specific instructions on how to slice someone’s chest open and cut their intestines like what was done to my father.” Avni joined relatives of three other Americans who had lost relatives to terror attacks in Tel Aviv, Jerusalem or the West Bank from 2014 to 2016, to file suit in New York federal court on July 12 2016 accusing Facebook of knowingly providing "material support" to Hamas." The legal claim was rejected; the court found that Facebook and other social media companies are not considered to be the publishers of material users post when digital tools used by the company match content with what the tool identifies as interested consumers.

MK Revital Swid, supported by the efforts of Lakin's son, Micah Lakin Avni, proposed the "Lakin bill" to require Facebook and other media companies to remove content that poses a danger to personal, public or state security. Although the bill did not become law, according to Justice Minister Ayelet Shaked, by the summer of 2016, Facebook had voluntarily removed 95 percent of 158 inciting posts, while YouTube, was removing 80 percent of 13 videos the government requested that it remove.

== See also ==
- 2015–2016 wave of violence in Israeli-Palestinian conflict
