= Carlo (submachine gun) =

Palestinian improvised submachine gun

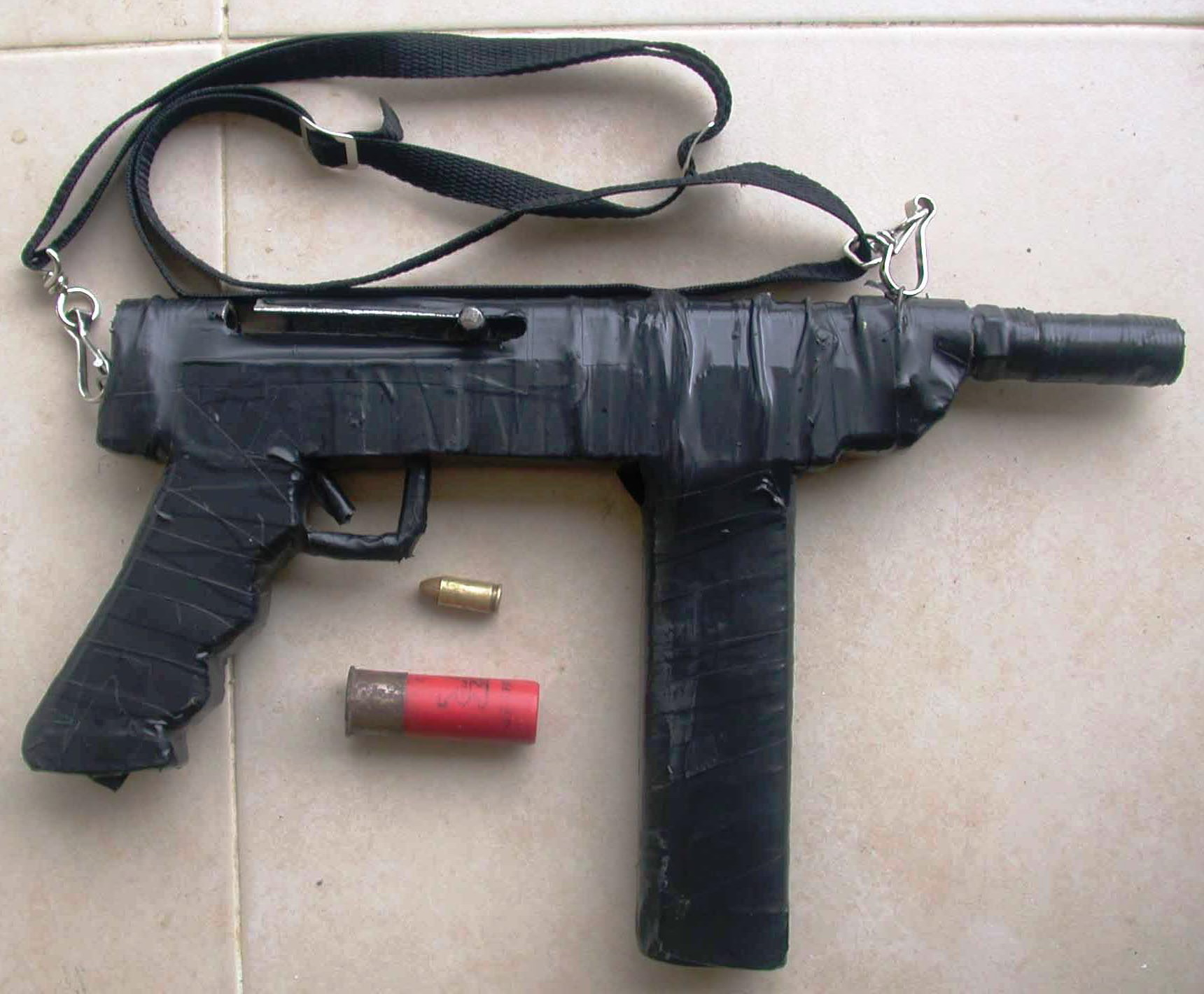
- A Carlo seized by IDF forces at a military checkpoint near Nablus, 2006
- Type: Submachine gun
- Place of origin: Palestine

Service history
- Used by: Various Palestinian militants; Palestinian and Israeli criminals
- Wars: Israeli-Arab conflict

Production history
- Designed: 2000(?)
- Manufacturer: Small metalworking shops
- Produced: 2000(?)-present

Specifications
- Mass: variable
- Length: variable
- Barrel length: variable
- Cartridge: Various cartridges
- Calibre: Various calibers
- Action: Simple (straight) blowback
- Rate of fire: variable
- Muzzle velocity: variable
- Feed system: Various magazine capacities

The Carlo (Arabic: كارلو; [kar.lu]), also referred to as the Carl Gustav (Arabic: كارلوجستاف; [kar.lu.dʒis.taf]) is an improvised submachine gun manufactured by small workshops in the Palestinian territories. The design was inspired by and named after the Swedish Carl Gustaf m/45 and its Egyptian Port Said variant; however, the similarity is often only passing.

The weapon is used by various Palestinian militants, including Hamas's Izz ad-Din al-Qassam Brigades and Palestinian Islamic Jihad's Al-Quds Brigades. It has also become popular with criminal groups in countries outside of the Levant, including in South American countries such as Brazil and Chile, Croatia, Ukraine, Italy, the Caribbean and Australia.

The Carlo's homemade nature makes it affordable on the black market, where it is purchased not only by Palestinians targeting Israelis, but also by Arab-Israeli gangs. The Carlo is cheap and requires little skill or equipment to manufacture, but it is inaccurate and prone to jamming and misfiring.

== History ==
Throughout the 2000s, it was primarily made and used by Arab-Israeli gangs, meant to serve as a cheaper alternative to the AK-47 and the Tavor. Palestinian militants had started using it by 2014, as the IDF reported netting several Carlos in a raid on a Nablus arms cache.

It gained widespread use during the 2015–2016 wave of violence in the Israeli–Palestinian conflict; according to The Guardian, it was used in up to 68 attacks during this period. Among the most notable include the death of Hadar Cohen and the June 2016 Tel Aviv shooting.

Carlos were used in the 2017 Temple Mount shooting, which resulted in the deaths of two Israeli Druze policemen, Haiel Sitawe and Kamil Shnaan. The two perpetrators of the 2025 Ramot Junction shooting also used Carlos, killing six before being shot themselves.

== Design ==
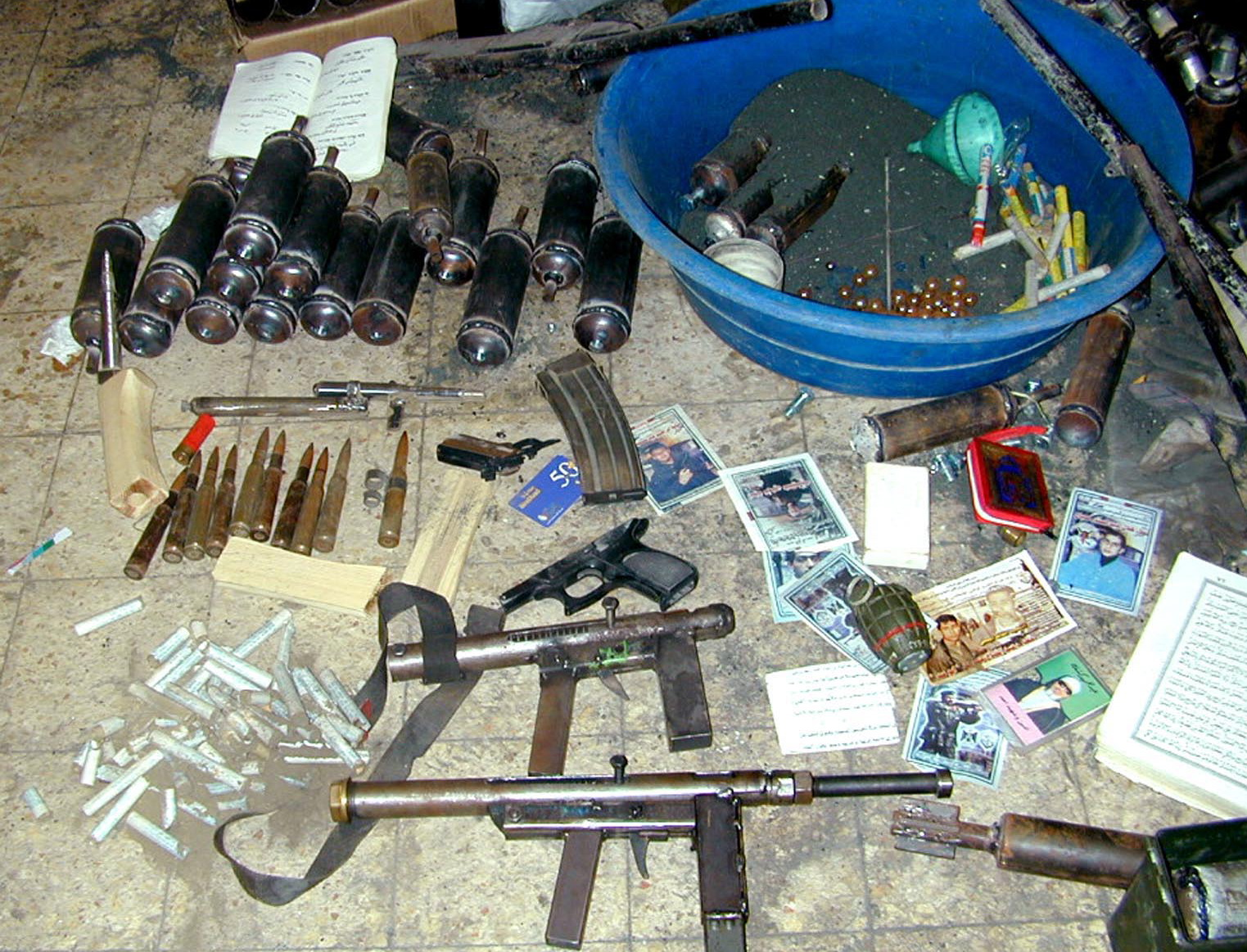
Several Carlos seized by IDF soldiers in Nablus in an arms cache during Operation Defensive Shield.

Produced in several locations via underground workshops and often with second-hand gun parts, the specifications are not uniform. Initially, it was made partially with scrapped pipes. Some more recent makes of the Carlo have been made with rifled barrels, raising the price from under USD$800 to nearly $4,000.

As of recent, most parts are cannibalized from lost/stolen M4-type rifles and magazines, taken from IDF training areas or people's houses. Others are made from rifle accessories that are easily purchased online, and some even incorporate parts of airsoft or paintball rifles.

Often chambered for 9×19mm handgun cartridges, variants for .22 LR, .32 ACP, 9×18mm, and 5.56×45mm are also produced, but the presence of the latter is suggested to be impossible since samples of the weapon had 5.56 NATO magazines modified to house Uzi magazines or sometimes with pistol-based magazines. Some of them were made with M16-type pistol grips and Uzi-based 25-round magazines. One instance of a Carlo seized had a STANAG magazine used to hide a 9×19 Uzi or a homemade magazine. Others were based on the MP5 and the AK rifles. They can only fire in full auto in an open bolt with the ejection port on the left side and the charging handle on the right side.

The Carlo, made to be compact, was best used by being concealed on the left side of someone's clothes (usually jacket) with the right hand being used to draw it.
