= Sarona Market =

Food market

Coordinates: 32°4′5″N 34°46′55″E

- שרונה מרקט
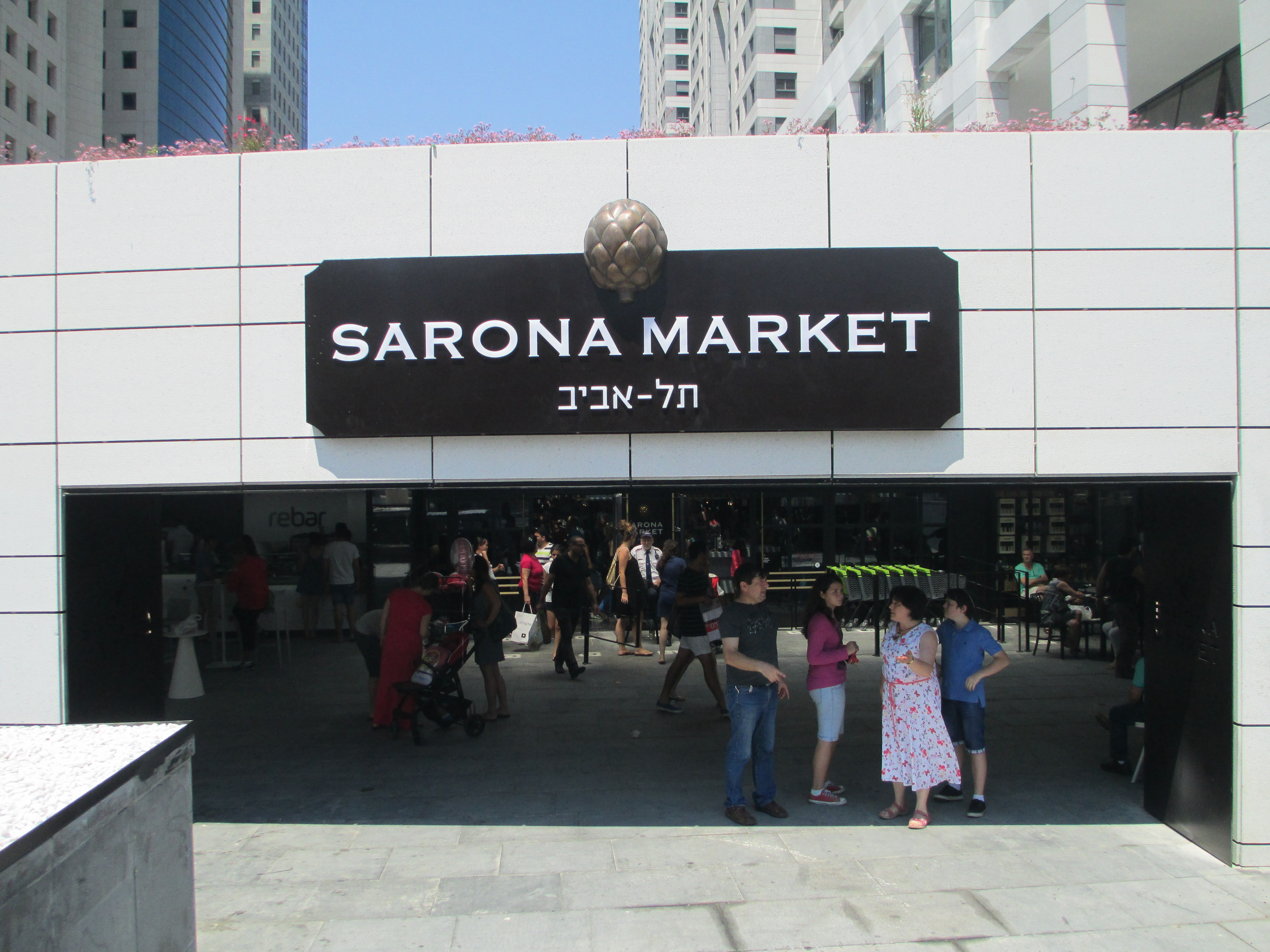
- Sarona Market in Tel Aviv
- Location: Tel Aviv, Israel
- Opened: 2015
- Developer: Gindi Holdings
- Architect: Kika Braz, Uri Ben Dror, Michael Ankawa (Studio Mo)
- Num. of stores: 90
- Floor area: 8,700 m^{2} (94,000 sq ft)

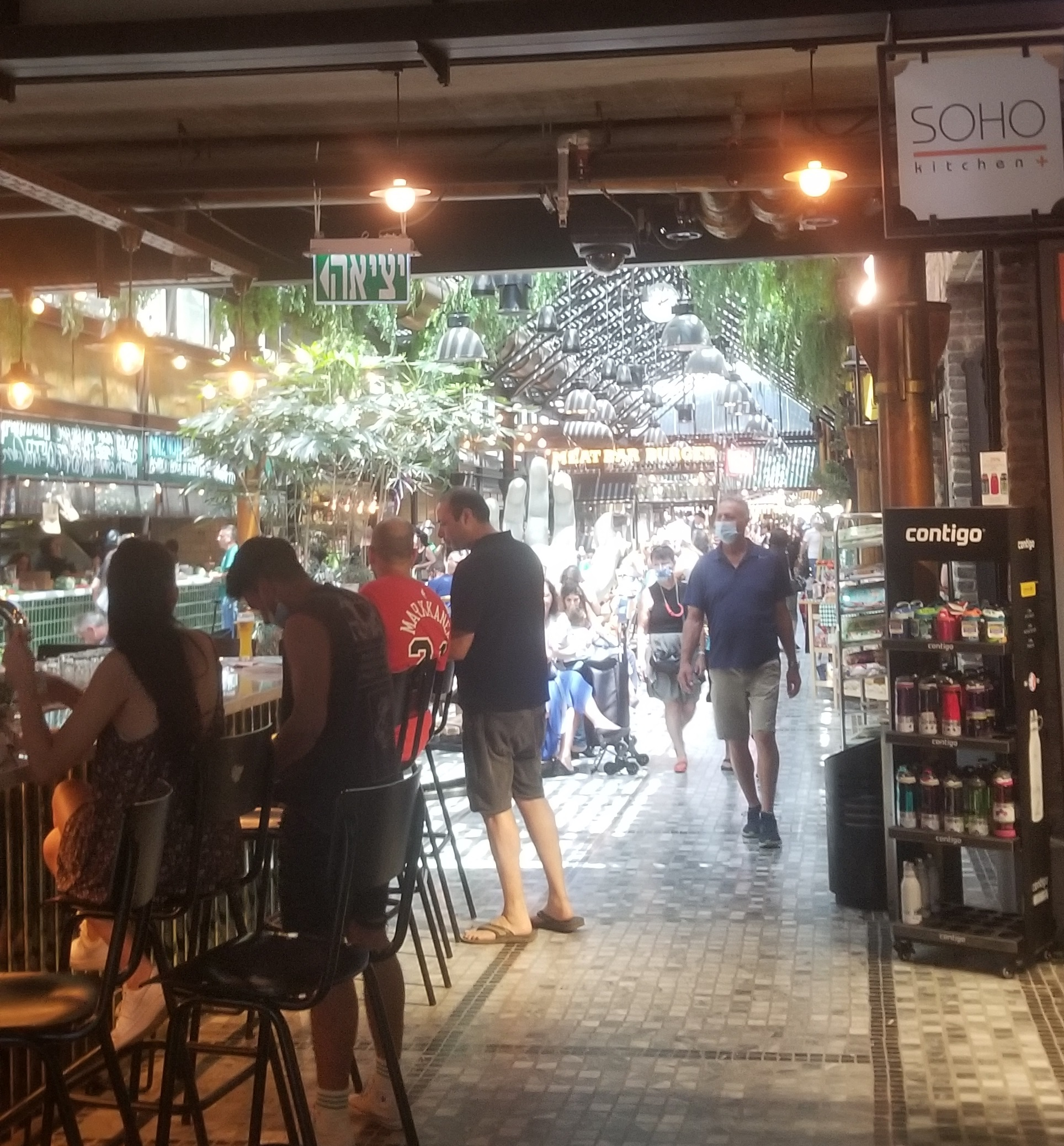
Sarona Market, July 2021

Sarona Market (Hebrew: שרונה מרקט) is the largest enclosed culinary market in Israel, located at the southern edge of the city's Templer Colony restoration project in Sarona, Tel Aviv. Sarona Market was constructed by Gindi Holdings and opened in 2015, and is the first indoor market in Israel. After its establishment, other enclosed markets were built throughout the country. In Sarona Market, there are about 90 businesses, including retail stores, food stands and restaurants. The complex is a popular tourist attraction.

== Development and architecture ==
Sarona Market was established in 2015, as part of Sarona Park in the south of the Kirya compound, between the reconstructed houses of the Templer colony. It was designed by architects Kika Braz, Uri Ben Dror and Michael Ankawa from Studio Mo. The project was built by Gindi Holdings. The market complex was established with an investment of over 530 million. It covers an area of 8,700 square meters.

== Terrorist attack ==
On June 8, 2016, two Palestinian gunmen opened fire on patrons at the Max Brenner restaurant in Sarona Market, killing four civilians and injuring 16 others.
