= 2016 Jerusalem bus bombing =

Terrorist incident in Jerusalem

2016 Jerusalem bombing
- Part of the Israeli–Palestinian conflict (2015–2016)
- The attack site
- Location: 31°44′51″N 35°12′30″E; Talpiot, Jerusalem
- Date: 18 April 2016 c. 18:00 (IDT)
- Target: Civilians
- Attack type: Suicide bombing
- Deaths: 1 (the assailant)
- Injuries: 21
- Assailant: Abdul Hamid Abu Srour

A Palestinian bomb attack was carried out on a bus in the Talpiot neighborhood in Jerusalem on 18 April 2016 at around 18:00. The bomber was a member of Hamas, which however did not claim responsibility. At least 21 people were injured, two critically.

== Attack ==
The explosion, on an Egged bus #12, set an adjacent bus, which was mostly empty, and a nearby car aflame. Most of the injuries were to passengers on the #12 Egged bus. It was the first attack on a bus in Jerusalem since 2011.

A police forensic team discovered remnants of a bomb in the wreckage. The investigation was under a police gag order.

== Assailant ==
The assailant, a 19-year-old Abdul Hamid Abu Srour, lost several limbs and succumbed in hospital several days after the bombing, Police did not initially confirm whether or not one of the individuals hospitalized was the bomber.

Hamas admitted that the assailant was a member of the West Bank branch of the organization, but did not claim responsibility for the bombing, it hailed the bomber as a "martyr."

== Reactions ==
Israeli Prime Minister Benjamin Netanyahu vowed retaliation; "We will locate those who prepared this explosive device. We will reach the dispatchers. We will also reach those behind them. We will settle the score with these terrorists."

On the Palestinian side, reactions were mixed. Hamas spokesman in Gaza praised the bombers, stating that it "Blesses the Jerusalem operation" and Gaza mosques welcomed the attack with announcements over their loud speakers. Another Hamas spokesman, Husam Badran said that "this attack affirms to everyone one that our people will not abandon the resistance path." Islamic Jihad praised the bombing.

Palestinian President Mahmoud Abbas, however, condemned the attack, saying that "we are against all forms of terrorist activity that affect Israeli and Palestinian civilians," and that the Palestinians "want to achieve an end to the occupation and the building of settlements through diplomatic means, and through peaceful resistance."
