= HaArba'a Street =

Coordinates: 32°4′13.06″N 34°47′8.20″E

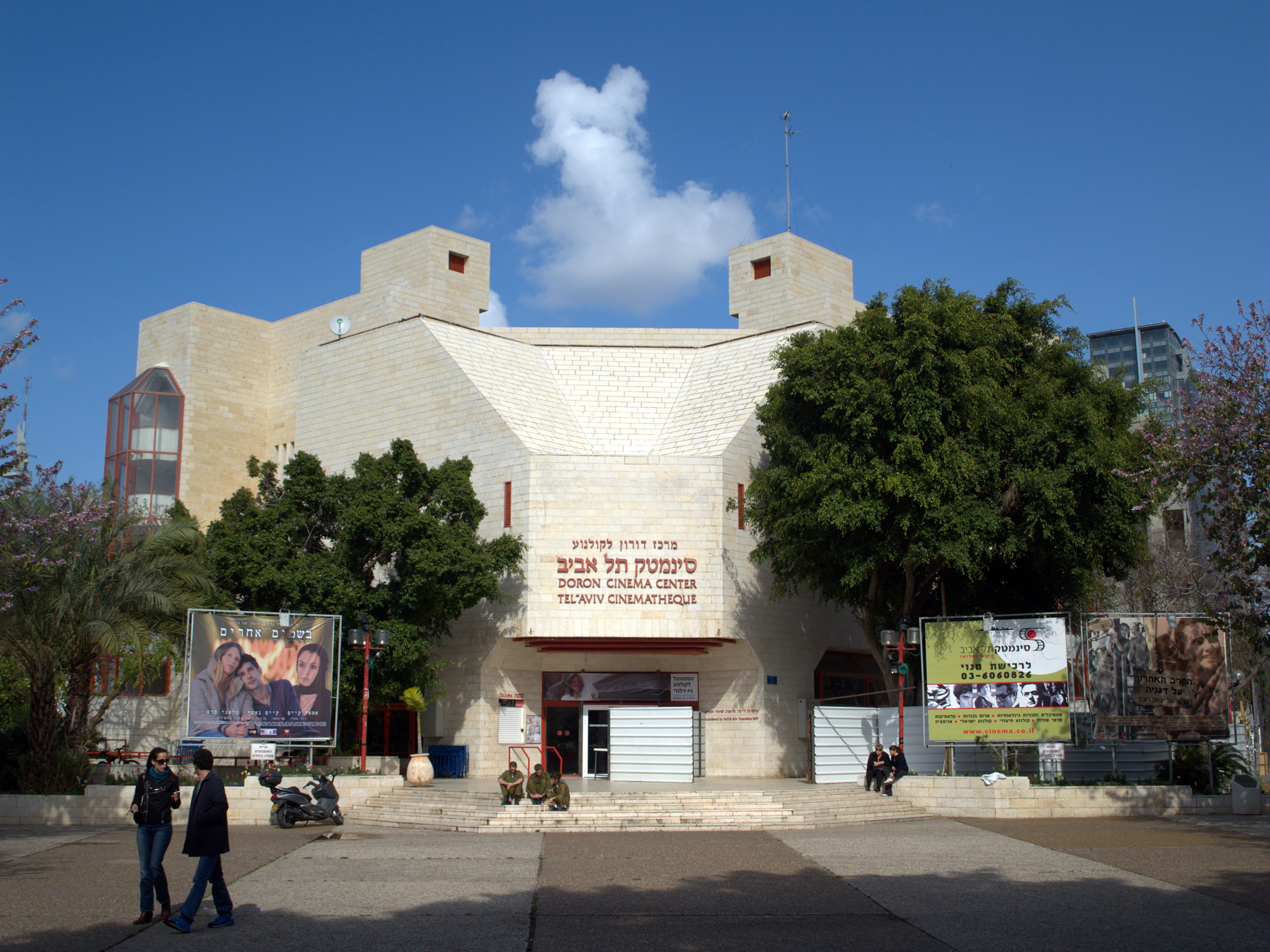
Tel Aviv Cinematheque on the triangle square

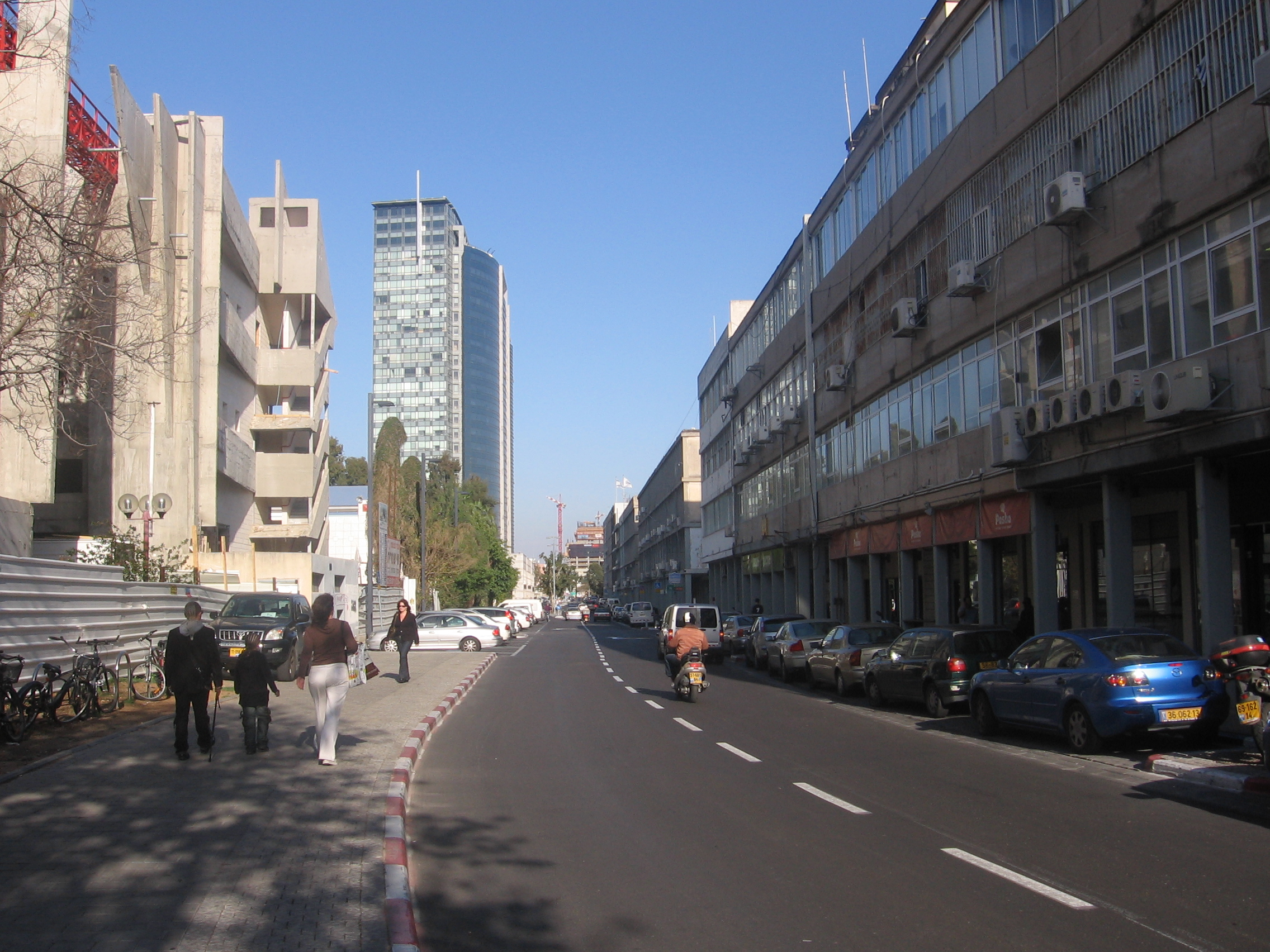

HaArba'a Street (The Four street) is a famous commercial street in central Tel Aviv, Israel. It was named after four members of the Haganah who were killed there in 1946 in an attack on nearby British Police that was nearby.

The street begins in the "Tel Aviv Cinematheque plaza" named by Chief Officer Shmuel Weizman and ends by Begin Road in Sarona. Until the Cinematheque was established in 1989, the square at the start of the street was triangular. Route of the road was the southern border of the German Colony Sarona in the north to the present to several houses Templars. Houses closest to the street were built later, in proportion to the rest of the village houses, and they have the international style that most new ones were built in Tel Aviv in the 1930s before abandoning the colony. Today, the street is part of the business square in Tel Aviv and is analogous to the business of Hahashmonaim and is part of the South Campus. Part of this project has been built so far at the eastern end of the street in the late '90s, three office towers − Millennium Tower, Tower East, and Platinum Tower and beside them, a unique structure of the plant matter of IEC. Companies located in the towers include Israel Corp., Israel Chemicals and KPMG Tower East state Comptroller office is located. Millennium Tower Restaurant is the home of chef Aviv Moshe. At the end of the street is a "Templar winery" near the German Colony – Templar "Sharona" designed to make the market structure. These street offices are also located in the center of local government in Israel.
