= Micah Lakin Avni =

Israeli lawyer

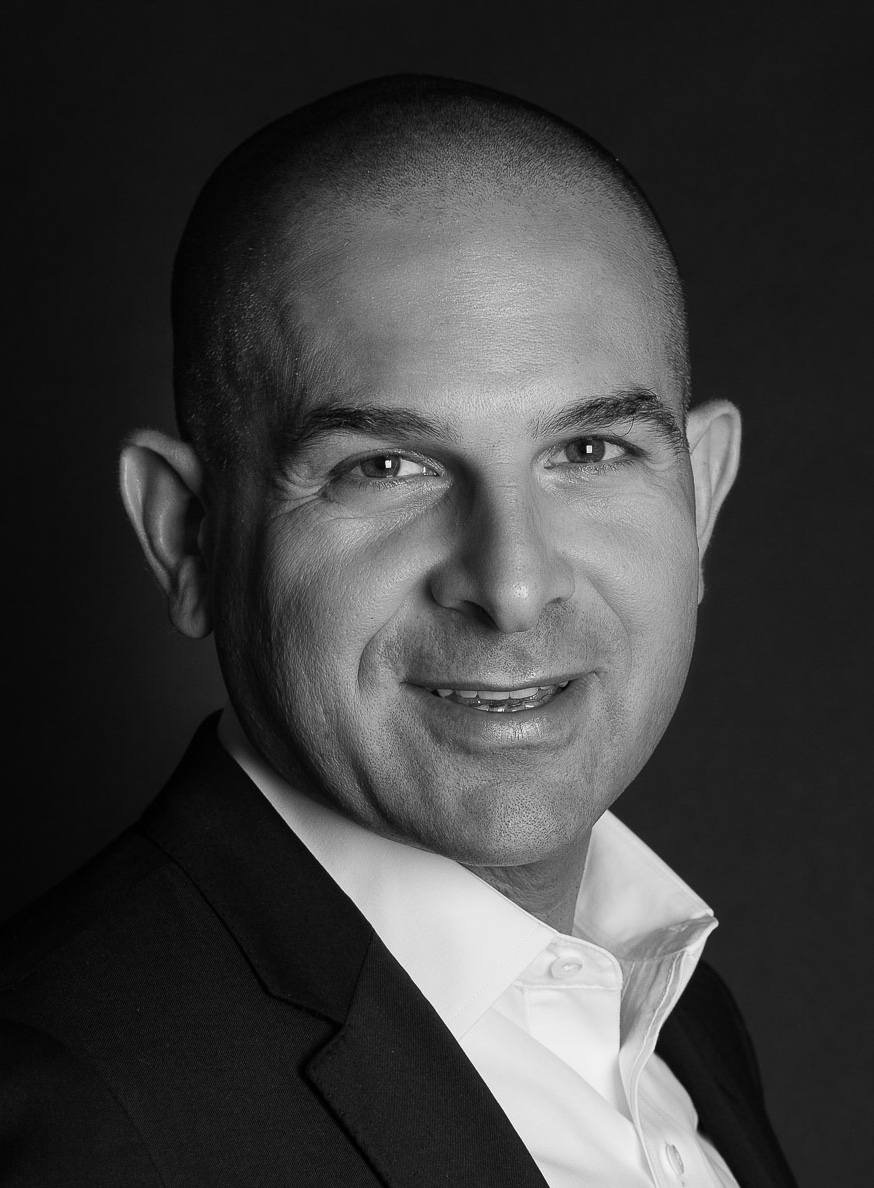
Micha Lakin Avni

Micah Lakin Avni (Hebrew: מיכה לייקין אבני; born June 13, 1969) is an Israeli businessman, attorney and a human rights and anti-terrorism activist.

Avni is the founder and CEO of Peninsula group, a publicly traded Israeli commercial finance company, between 2000 and 2004 he was a managing partner at Jerusalem Global Ventures (JGV), a venture capital fund known for its investments in software, telecommunications, and life sciences-related start ups. He previously worked as part of the Hi-Tech Practice Group at Yigal Arnon & Co. He was one of the team that founded Deltathree.com. Avni also serves as the chairman of Concert – Together for Israel (previously, Kela Shlomo Ltd.), a public-private partnership whose aim is to combat the delegitimization of the State of Israel. Micah serves as the chairman of the Association of Israeli Credit Companies.

== Childhood and family ==
Avni's family moved to Israel from Connecticut in the United States in 1984. His father, Richard Lakin, was a civil rights advocate and school principal in Glastonbury, Connecticut before the family moved to Israel. He was one of the Freedom Riders who marched with the Rev. Martin Luther King Jr. After moving to Israel, Lakin taught English to mixed classes of Palestinians and Israeli. Avni's mother is Karen Lakin.

Avni chose to Hebraize his surname. Avni studied at the American School in Kfar Shmaryahu and later served in the IDF as a combat soldier and commander in the Golani Brigade. After his military service, he received his LL.B. from the Hebrew University of Jerusalem where he studied from 1992 to 1995. A few years later, between 2002 and 2004, Avni continued his studies and completed his MBA in a joint program between Tel Aviv University and the Kellogg School of Business at Northwestern University in Chicago (Kellogg-Recanati Program).

Avni is married to Rita Avni, founder and CEO of one of Israel's leading forensic accountant firms, Avni Advisory Services. Together they are parents to two daughters as well as two sons from previous marriages. The family lives in Tel Aviv.

== Career ==
Avni is a member of the Israeli Bar Association since 1996, the same year he began working as an attorney at Yigal Arnon & Co. From 2000 to 2004, he became a General Partner at Jerusalem Global Ventures, an Israel-based venture capital fund. As of 2018, Avni is a member on the board of directors at Charge After. He previously served as a director at Kashya (acquired by EMC) and the advisory board of Fundbox. He also serves as Chairman of the Association of Credit Companies in Israel.

In 2004, Avni founded a private company named Peninsula and serves as its CEO. Peninsula provides credit to growing small and medium-sized Israeli businesses that advance Israeli industries. The company's shares are divided between the investment firm Meitav Dash (51%), Micah Lakin Avni (8%), Migdal Insurance Company Ltd. (10%) and the public. In December 2014, Peninsula began to be traded on the Tel Aviv Stock Exchange. Peninsula is rated “A” by S&P Maalot and Moodys.

Peninsula expanded and also established investment private equity fund. In December 2015, the company won a bid of ILS 450 million to the Ministry of Economy for the establishment and management of an investment fund for long-term growth of medium-sized businesses. In August 2017, another fund was launched called “The Peninsula Fund for 100+ Businesses” scaled at about ILS 200 million.

In September 2012, Avni wrote an article published in the Calcalist journal which discussed limiting the use of cash. This prompted a discussion that appointed the “Locker Committee” to reduce the use of cash. The committee's conclusions turned into a bill which was adopted into law by the Israeli parliament in 2018 and will go into effect at the beginning of 2019.

In each of the years 2015, 2016 and 2018 Avni was elected to the list of The Marker's 100 Most Influential People in Israel following his involvement in opening the credit market to free competition.

== Anti-terrorism activism ==
Avni's father, Richard Lakin, a retired elementary school principal and a peace activist, was stabbed in the face and chest and shot in the head by Palestinian attackers while riding the #78 bus in Jerusalem during the wave of Palestinian terrorism in October, 2015.

After his father's death, Avni published an opinion piece in The New York Times in November 2015 that raised public debate on the issue of social media incitement. Due to the increased amount of activities related to the subject, Avni established a movement against incitement on social media titled “Stop Incitement”, and initiated “Lakin’s Law” at the same year. The law proposes regulation of Facebook in Israel in cases of posts that encourage incitement. Avni gave two speeches at the United Nations and interviewed on CNN about it as well as met with the US Vice President Joe Biden and Secretary-General of the United Nations Ban Ki-moon.

In March, 2016, Avni spoke for the first time before the United Nations Human Rights Council in Geneva, urging them and United Nations Secretary General Ban Ki-moon to condemn the murder of a civilian on a bus in Israel as an act of terrorism, calling the failure of the United Nations and the Secretary-General to do so an act of "hypocrisy."

“Killing civilians on a bus is terror. I challenge you to specifically condemn the murder of my father, Richard Lakin”, Avni stated when appearing before the UN and Secretary General Ban Ki-Moon, who visited following the murder in Armon Hanatziv. His second appearance occurred on 09.12.2016 when a closed discussion was held on the cessation of incitement that encourages terrorist activity. Avni said: “extreme terrorist organizations use social networks to incite and encourage young people around the world to join them”, calling the phenomenon, “open source jihad.” He said social media networks incited Baha ‘Alian, his father’s murderer, who was later described as a shahid on Facebook. Avni called on the UN “to condemn the Chairman of the Palestinian Authority and the Palestinian Authority for creating a culture of hatred and an ecosystem of incitement to terror, and demand that the Chairman of the Palestinian Authority and the Palestinian Authority stop poisoning the minds of innocent Palestinian children against peace.”

In the wake of his father's murder, Avni became a lead plaintiff in the 2015 Facebook lawsuit filed in a New York state court by 2,000 Israeli victims of Palestinian terror attack against Facebook, on the grounds that the social media company permitted the posting of "incitement to murder and the glorification of violence against innocent civilians." His father's murderer, Bahas Alian, had announced his planned attack in advance on Facebook.

In total, Avni filed two civil suits against Facebook. One of the suits totaled one billion dollars. At 2017 Avni was involved in efforts to expose the phenomenon of videos on YouTube that encourage terrorism and are funded by advertisements of international corporations. Following investigation and publication on the topic by the British Times, there has been a decrease in the number of videos on social media networks that encourage incitement, violence, and racism as well as the removal of Hamas and its leaders social media accounts.

In March 2018 Avni appeared again in front of the UN Human Rights Council where he said: “The Palestinian Authority actually has a pay-to-slay law. Palestinians systematically pay terrorists to murder Jews". Members of this council, what if I were to pay 300 million dollars to have all of your fathers butchered, would you report on that?”

As of January 2018, Avni also serves as the Chairman of Concert – Together for Israel (previously known as "Kela Shlomo"), a public-private partnership established to combat the delegitimization of the State of Israel and the BDS movement.
