= 2021 Jerusalem shooting =

Shooting in Jerusalem

- Part of the Gaza-Israel conflict
- Video released by Israeli police
- Location: Jerusalem
- Date: 21 November 2021 (4 years ago)
- Weapon: Carlo-type submachine gun
- Deaths: 1 victim, 1 perpetrator
- Injuries: 4 victims
- Victim: Eliyahu Kay
- Perpetrator: Fadi Abu Shkhaydam (Hamas)
- Motive: Palestinian nationalism

On 21 November 2021, a shooting took place in the Old City of Jerusalem. Fadi Abu Shkhaydem, a 42-year-old Palestinian from East Jerusalem killed Eliyahu Kay, a 26 year old dual citizen of Israel and South Africa, who had made aliyah in 2019. He injured four others (including a rabbi) before being shot dead by police.

The shooting started as the targets were making their way to prayer. Israeli authorities recorded that Abu Shkhaydem shot the tour guide multiple times, and was later pronounced dead at the Hadassah Medical Center in Ein Kerem. The gunman also wounded a rabbi and seriously injured a yeshiva student. Policemen quickly responded by firing at the shooter, killing him. Two of the police officers sustained mild injuries.

== Perpetrator ==
The gunman, Fadi Abu Shkhaydem, was a high school teacher at the Rashidiya school from the Shuafat neighbourhood of Jerusalem. He was widely known to be a Hamas member and regularly preached sermons at the Temple Mount, in addition to taking part in demonstrations against Israeli tourism in the area.

His wife, who had gone to Jordan three days before to visit her sick mother, was arrested the next day at Allenby Bridge. A police report said he that was most likely politically motivated by "nationalist reasons". In January 2022 the Abu Shkhaydem's house was given a demolition order as part of a general Israeli policy.

== Aftermath ==
The Temple Mount was closed to visitors immediately following the shooting attack. Later that day, Hamas confirmed that the attacker was a member of their group and hailed the attack as a "heroic operation". This was the second attack in Jerusalem's Old City in four days, and the first Israeli civilian casualty since the 2021 Israel–Palestine crisis.

Many Israeli authorities and organizations condemned the attack, including Isaac Herzog, the Western Wall Heritage Foundation, and Naftali Bennett.

The following day, France and the United States Department of State both released a condemnation of the shooting. Dimiter Tzantchev also condemned the attack as "senseless".
