= CyberWell =

Israeli non-governmental organization

- Formation: 2022
- Founder: Tal-Or Cohen Montemayor
- Website: cyberwell.org

CyberWell is a non-governmental organization based in Israel dedicated to combatting online antisemitism. It uses artificial intelligence and open-source intelligence to track antisemitic communications and publishes analysis of its findings.

== Background ==
CyberWell founder Tal-Or Cohen Montemayor is a United States-born resident of Israel who made aliyah in 2009 with Garin Tzabar. After serving in the Israeli Defense Forces, she studied law and political science at Reichman University, then became an activist and expert on extremist movements, hate crimes and antisemitism. She established CyberWell in 2022.

== Activities ==
A June 2023 analysis by CyberWell reported that social media platforms were removing 20% of content expressing antisemitism and Holocaust denial.

In January 2024, CyberWell claimed to have helped remove more than 50,000 items of antisemitic content from various platforms. A CyberWell report from the same month found that social media posts claiming that Jews killed Jesus rose tenfold after the October 7 attacks.

In conjunction with Sexual Assault Awareness Month in April 2024, CyberWell published an analysis of online denial of sexual violence in the October 7 attacks. The following month, the organization released a study finding that social media platforms were removing a quarter of antisemitic posts written in Arabic compared to those written in English.

In June 2024, CyberWell met with affiliates of the European Leadership Network from Denmark, Finland, Latvia, Lithuania, and Norway to discuss the online spread of antisemitism.

A January 2025 report by CyberWell praised TikTok for its efforts to remove content promoting Holocaust denial and noted that other major social media platforms had made recent significant improvements to moderation.

CyberWell reported in February 2025 that YouTube had failed to enforce “Advertiser-Friendly Content” policies, with the result of "effectively monetiz[ing] antisemitic content on the platform."

In a May 2025 interview with International Policy Digest, Cohen Montemayor said that in recent election cycles in the United Kingdom, United States, Canada, and Australia, "classic antisemitism criticizing disproportionate Jewish power and conspiracies of covert control are the most prevalent types of Jewish hatred in election antisemitism across the board." The Jewish Independent also reported, citing Cyberwell research, that antisemitic posts on X had attacked both Australian Labor candidate Anthony Albanese and Liberal candidate Peter Dutton, "condemning both as tools of Jewish interests."

In July 2025, the organization "documented a sharp rise in derogatory and violent language against the Druze community" in the wake of the related violence in Southern Syria.

Cohen Montemayor told The Jerusalem Post in August 2025 that "AI tools are making it increasingly difficult to monitor and control harmful content at scale."

Cohen Montemayor's byline has appeared in USA Today and The Jerusalem Post.
