= 2016 Jerusalem shooting =

Terrorist incident in Jerusalem

- Part of Israeli–Palestinian conflict
- Location: East Jerusalem
- Date: 9 October 2016
- Target: Civilians, police officers
- Attack type: Mass shooting
- Weapon: Firearm
- Deaths: 2 (in addition to the perpetrator)
- Injuries: 6
- Perpetrator: 39 year old Palestinian man
- Motive: Islamist terrorism

On 9 October 2016 in Jerusalem, Musbah Abu Sbaih, a Hamas militant shot 8 people from a car near the Ammunition Hill light rail stop, killing two and wounding six. The police gave chase, Shaih was shot and killed while shooting at pursuing police.

== Attack ==
The gunman attacked the Ammunition Hill Jerusalem Light Rail station in East Jerusalem, located near the national police headquarters, in a drive-by shooting. Police on motorcycles gave chase as the gunman fled to the nearby predominately Arab Sheikh Jarrah neighborhood where he shot and wounded two police officers and was subsequently killed in a shootout with police.

=== Background ===
The attack took place at a time when terrorist attacks had declined and casualties were rare since the few recent attacks had been planned by untrained "Lone wolves," who planned poorly and were not heavily armed with guns or explosives.

The attack was unusual because strict gun control makes it rare for non-security personnel to have access to guns. Most terrorist attacks on Israelis in 2015/16 were stabbing attacks or vehicle ramming attacks, making this the deadliest attack on Israelis since the June 2016 Tel Aviv shooting.

== Attacker ==
The gunman, Musbah Abu Sbaih, (alt. Mesbah Abu Sbaih), (39) was a member of Hamas. was a resident of the East Jerusalem neighborhood of Silwan. He had a long police record, with Yossi Melman remarking that Sbaih had a "record of involvement in provocations regarding the Temple Mount, incitement, friction with security forces, and serving a year in prison".

On the day of the shooting, the Sbaih was due to begin serving a four-month prison sentence for assaulting a police officer in 2013. According to a Hamas statement following the attack, Abu Sbaih was due to serve a 4-month term of "administrative detention," but, "Instead of handing himself over, he chose the best way of the holy warriors, to carry out a heroic attack." Hamas claimed credit for the killings, and described Sbaih as a man known as the "Lion of Al Aqsa."

== Response ==
=== Israeli response ===
Public Security Minister Gilad Erdan blamed the attacks on the fact that, "Incitement is plentiful, and it drives people to commit terror attacks." He stated that Facebook and other social media companies are, "directly responsible for what's happening." Callin it, "Scandalous that Facebook reopened Hamas' pages last week in the wake of pressure from the Palestinian street."

==== Security measures and arrests ====
Israeli police closed the pastry shop belonging to the gunman's family on October 11, describing the shop as a "center for incitement," where videos that "encourage terrorism" were filmed. The family of the killer had celebrated the event by passing out candy to passersby and visitors after the shootings.

Israeli police closed a printing shop in the town of A-Ram that had been publishing posters in praise of the perpetrator, including some posted at his family home. Printing equipment and the stock of incitement posters were seized.

The day after the attack, the perpetrator's 17-year-old daughter, Eiman, posted a video of herself on Facebook in which she said, "We deem my father as martyr. ... I am proud of what my father did. ... We're very happy and proud of our father. ... My father is a great man." She was arrested and detained for 5 days, then released after paying a fine. She was required to stay out of Jerusalem for 2 months, not post on social media, and not give any media interviews for an unstipulated amount of time.

=== Palestinian responses ===
Players for West Bank Premier League soccer team Hilal Al-Quds Club in East Jerusalem had their photo taken under a banner celebrating the gunman as "martyr" and a "hero." However, a team spokesman told the Associated Press that the image would be removed from social media sites because it violates FIFA rules.

Published photos show supporters of Hamas handing out baklava and candy in celebration of the "martyrdom" of Abu Sbeih. Candy was also handed out in his honor in eastern Jerusalem. Fatah, the Party of Palestinian Authority President Mahmoud Abbas praised the killer and proclaimed a day of mourning in the gunman's memory. The team's coach, 55-year-old Maher abu Snina, was arrested "on suspicion of incitement and support for terrorist activities against Jews."

On Eid al-Fitr, 2017, a Palestinian family distributed boxes of candy with an image of killer Musbah Abu Sbaih on the lid to Muslim worshipers on the Temple Mount.

=== Other responses ===
The Omani newspaper Alwatan described the shootings as, "a response to Israel's crimes".

Lamis Deek, a member of the Board of Directors of the New York Council on American–Islamic Relations, criticized those who describe the drive-by shooting as an "attack," characterizing it instead as an example of a Palestinian Arab who was "resisting violence."

== Analysis ==
According to Avi Issacharoff this attack was promoted by Palestinian activists as a "template for future actions in the so-called 'Al-Quds Intifada.'"

According to Amos Harel, since the attack was filmed by Palestinians, it is likely to generate copycat attacks.

Yossi Melman discussed this attack in the context of the "weakening" authority of aging Palestinian Authority President Mahmoud Abbas.

Chief of Israeli police Roni Alsheikh admitted in a press conference that he feared that the "success" of this murderer might embolden others to attack Israelis.

== See also ==
- January 2016 Tel Aviv shooting
- June 2016 Tel Aviv shooting
- 2016 Würzburg train attack
