= 2015–2016 wave of violence in the Israeli–Palestinian conflict =

Notable increase of violence in the Israeli–Palestinian conflict

Israeli–Palestinian conflict (2015–16)
- Part of the Israeli–Palestinian conflict
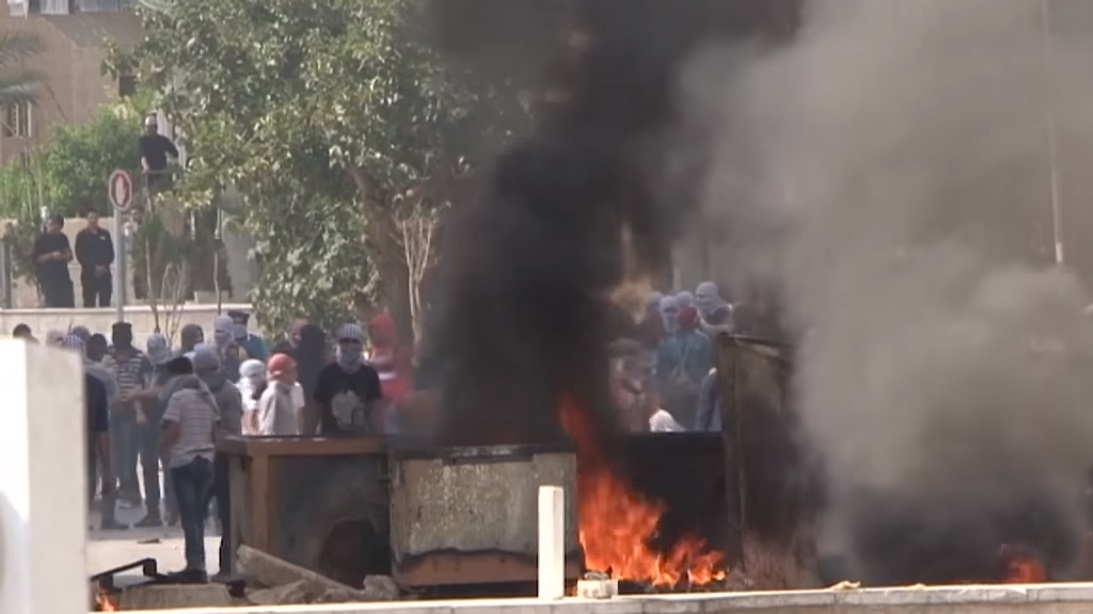
- Near Beit El on 10 October 2015
Date	September 2015 – June 2016
Location	Israel, Palestine

Belligerents
Israel: IDF; Shin Bet; Israel Police; Magav	Hamas; Palestinian lone wolves; Arab Israeli lone wolves

Casualties and losses
38 killed: 31 civilians; 5 security personnel; 2 killed by friendly fire; 558 wounded (civilians and security forces)	235 killed: 162 in the West Bank (excl. East Jerusalem); 36 in Jerusalem; 29 in Gaza Strip; 9 in Israel (excl. West Jerusalem); 3,917 injured 11,611 suffered from smoke inhalation 7,955 detained
- 3 foreign civilians (2 U.S., 1 Eritrean) killed and 2 (1 U.S., 1 Nepalese) wounded

An increase of violence occurred in the Israeli–Palestinian conflict starting in the autumn of 2015 and lasting into the first half of 2016. It was called the "Intifada of the Individuals" by Israeli sources, the Knife Intifada, Stabbing Intifada or Jerusalem Intifada by international sources because of the many stabbings in Jerusalem, or Habba by Palestinian sources. 38 Israelis and 235 Palestinians were killed in the violence. 558 Israelis and thousands of Palestinians were injured.

In the latter half of 2015, there were on average three Palestinian attacks per day. It decreased to one per day in 2016 but continued at that level for months. Between October 2015 and March 2016 there were 211 stabbings or attempted stabbings of Israelis by Palestinians, 83 shootings and 42 car-ramming attacks killing 30 Israelis and two Americans. Over 200 Palestinians were killed by Israeli security forces, 130 of them while allegedly carrying out attacks on Israelis.

The Palestinian violence during this period was characterized by its uncoordinated nature; most attacks were opportunistic "lone wolf" assaults on Israelis, carried out by individuals acting alone and not attributable to any political faction. That Israeli security forces frequently killed attackers was condemned by human rights organizations and others who claimed that it often amounted to summary executions. Others insisted that Israel had the right to defend itself.

Several events have been attributed as the starting point of the renewed hostilities. On 9 September, Israel outlawed Palestinian groups engaged in aggressive protests against Jewish groups visiting the Temple Mount. On 13 September, Palestinian youths clashed with Israeli police at al-Aqsa. Daily clashes, encouraged by Palestinian President Mahmoud Abbas, continued for several days. On 22 September, Hadeel al-Hishlamoun was shot and killed by Israeli soldiers, allegedly while trying to stab them. Tensions escalated further on 1 October 2015 when an Israeli couple were killed by Palestinian militants, followed by the 3 October Lions' Gate stabbings and the 7 October stabbing of Daniel Rosenfeld by Shorouq Dwayyat.

Different explanations have been given for the Palestinian unrest. These include Israel appearing to seek to change the "status quo" surrounding the Temple Mount, social-media campaigns that may have motivated the attackers, frustration over the failure of peace talks and the suppression of human rights, and incitement.

== Possible causes for the wave of violence ==
According to many analysts, the key issue was access to what is known to Muslims as al-Haram al-Sharif or the Noble Sanctuary and to Jews as the Temple Mount. A "status quo" have been in place since 1967 which safeguards Muslim access to the site and prevents Jewish groups from performing religious rituals there.

Late in the summer of 2015, suspicion spread among Palestinians that Israel was attempting to change the status quo of the Mount by imposing age and gender restrictions on Muslim access while allowing entry to larger groups of Jewish activists. The suspicions were strengthened by calls from Jewish religious activists to visit the Mount on 13 September, eve of Rosh Hashana, the Jewish new year. Visitors on that date included Agricultural Minister Uri Ariel, who was filmed praying at the site in front of his police escorts, openly flaunting the prohibition against Jewish prayers.

On 9 September 2015, Israel outlawed two Palestinian groups, "Mourabitoon" and "Murabitat", involved in aggressive protests at the Temple Mount against Jewish visiting groups. Israeli police enforce exclusively Muslim prayer at the site and visits to the site by Jewish campaigners have led to clashes with Mourabitoon and Mourabitaat activists. Defense Minister Moshe Ya'alon, who signed the ban, said in a statement that the Mourabitoon and Mourabitaat are a "main cause in the creation of tension and violence on the Temple Mount (al Aqsa compound) specifically and Jerusalem in general". The Palestinian Authority opposed this ban and supported the activists.

Israeli generals have claimed that, to a notable degree, Palestinian violence was driven by anger at and revenge for Israeli actions, and that frustrations over the stagnation of diplomatic initiatives also contributed. A report by Israeli intelligence services stated that the unrest was motivated by Palestinian "feelings of national, economic and personal deprivation."

Some also pointed out the increasing incitement and involvement of the Islamic State group in regard to Palestinian youth, with Islamic State cell members arrested in the West Bank in January 2015.

== Palestinian attacks ==
During the events, Palestinians from the West Bank and East Jerusalem carried out assaults against Israeli soldiers, policement as well as against civilians. Most of the attacks were carried out by unaffiliated assailants and have been described by Israeli and sometimes by other sources as acts of terrorism.

The Israeli Intelligence and Terrorism Information Center has published a breakdown of the attacks on 24 May 2016, about 8 months from the start of the events. Out of 215 attacks recorded between 13 September 2015 and 24 May 2016, the most prominent type was stabbing attacks with a total of 149 incidents (69%). Stabbing attacks have been the most frequent type of assault in 2013 and 2014, but during the events of 2015–2016, they increased. The stabbings were followed by vehicular attacks with 29 incidents (14%), shooting attacks with 21 incidents (10%) and other attacks including the use of Improvised explosive devices and combined assaults.

Over half of the attacks (134) occurred in the Israeli-occupied West Bank. About a quarter (58) took place in the city of Jerusalem (including East Jerusalem) and the rest (23) occurred within the recognized boundaries of Israel, which saw an increase in the number of attacks since the preceding years.

== Impact on Israeli society ==
The near daily attacks affected Jewish Israeli society and Jewish Israeli opinions toward the Palestinians in various ways. A poll conducted by the Israel Democracy Institute in October 2015 found that 53 percent of Jewish Israeli respondents believed that a Palestinian suspect of a "terrorist attack should be killed on the spot, even if he has been apprehended and no longer poses a threat" and 80 percent said that the home of the family of a Palestinian who has murdered Jews on a nationalist background should be demolished." In the same report 57 percent reported that they feared either for themselves or for someone they knew and only 23 percent believed that Palestinian despair over the lack of progress in peace talks was behind the spike in attacks. A poll in December 2015 found that 77 percent of Israelis felt unsafe and that nearly half were reluctant to attend public Hanukkah celebrations.

After an attack in a supermarket, one of Israel's major grocery chains, Rami Levy pulled all knives, kitchen scissors and pizza cutters from the aisles so that they would not be used as weapons by Palestinian attackers.

In October in the weekly magazine Mishpacha, popular among ultra-Orthodox Haredi Jews, a letter that went viral appeared to beg Arabs not to kill Haredim appeared. The letter, written in Arabic, began "We, the Hareidim do not go up to the Temple Mount, you do not see Hareidim on the Temple Mount, Hareidim do not want to change the status quo, and the Hareidim have no part in this – so please, stop murdering us." Many Haredi Jews had been targeted in the Old City of Jerusalem, ostensibly because of their distinguishable clothing. According to Mishpacha's editor, Yossi Elituv the appeal was meant as a literary device and was misunderstood.

During the unrest, demand for handguns soared and Israeli leaders encouraged licensed gun owners to carry their weapons. The mayor of Jerusalem, Nir Barkat in October 2015 compared it to "military reserve duty" and claimed that bystanders shooting Palestinian attackers had prevented many attacks. Netanyahu, echoing his comments, said that "Civilians are at the forefront of the war against terrorism and must also be on maximum alert."

== Impact on Palestinian society ==
Initially, Palestinians were broadly supportive of attacks against Israelis but the support waned over time. In a poll conducted by the Palestinian think tank Palestinian Center for Policy and Survey Research (PCPSR) among Palestinians released in December 2015 showed that 57 percent of Palestinians in the West Bank supported knife attacks. That number had shrunk to 44 percent in March 2016. However, a majority still believed that an armed intifada would serve them better than negotiations.

The same opinion polls showed that the unrest didn't affect public opinion about Abbas and the Palestinian Authority – they remained widely unpopular. In the fall of 2015 over half of the respondents of PCPSR:s poll favored dissolving the PA altogether and two years later in poll conducted among West Bank Palestinians, 46 percent viewed the PA as a "burden" and 60 percent wished Abbas would resign.

== Extrajudicial killings ==
Human rights organizations, such as B'Tselem and Amnesty International, and Palestinian leaders, and others said that some killings of Palestinian attackers and others by Israeli security forces were extrajudicial killings.

In a joint statement with the Israeli NGO B'tselem, Amnesty International stated that in some instances Israeli forces have engaged in extrajudicial killings, which Israeli politicians are accused of openly endorsing as a response to Palestinians merely suspected by police of terrorist intentions of unarmed civilians. Netanyahu made a point of saying when the US killed the San Bernardino shooters, nobody said they were extrajudicial killings and claimed that Israel was unfairly criticized. Human Rights Watch, raising the possibility that Israel may be engaged in violations of international law, has expressed concern over what it calls Israel's "indiscriminate and even deliberate" shooting of protesters.

On 27 October 2015, Amnesty called for Israel to end its "pattern of unlawful killings." The organization examined four cases, 19-year-old Sa'ad Muhammad Youssef al-Atrash, 17-year-old Dania Jihad Hussein Ershied, 19-year-old Fadi Alloun, and 18-year-old Hadeel al-Hashlamon, which it claimed were deliberately shot while they posed no imminent threat to life and that the killings therefore were extrajudicial. It also noted some cases in which the person shot were not given medical assistance and was left bleeding to death on the ground. Philip Luther, Director of the Middle East and North Africa Programme at Amnesty International, stated:

"There is mounting evidence that, as tensions have risen dramatically, in some cases Israeli forces appear to have ripped up the rulebook and resorted to extreme and unlawful measures. They seem increasingly prone to using lethal force against anyone they perceive as posing a threat, without ensuring that the threat is real."

In a B'Tselem report from 16 December 2015, the organization listed twelve incidents in which Israeli soldiers and other security forces allegedly used excessive force against Palestinians, by shooting attackers or suspected attackers even after they no longer posed any danger. B'Tselem accused Netanyahu of overseeing a "new pseudo-normative reality" in which a "shoot to kill" approach should always be adopted by police officers or armed civilians regarding suspected Palestinian attackers.

In February 2016, Defence for Children International accused the Israeli army of the intentional killing of Palestinian children in the West Bank. It said that the IDF had killed more than 180 Palestinians since the unrest began in October 2015, including 49 children. It said: "Repeated killing and shooting of children by Israeli army, and preventing paramedics from offering medical aid to them is considered a form of extrajudicial killing".

== Casualties ==
Al-Jazeera English reported 285 Palestinians and 42 Israelis killed. Ma'an News reported 236 Palestinians, 34 Israelis and 5 foreigners killed. 59 Palestinian children (the youngest being 8-months old), 1 Israeli child were among those killed.

For the Palestinian casualties Ma'an analyzed the following:

- 101 (Note: Includes stabbing (69), vehicular (13), shooting (8), and 5+3+1+2 committing various other kinds of attacks.) Palestinians were killed while attempting to commit stabbing, shooting or vehicular attacks.
- 63 killed by Israeli forces in raids, protests and clashes
- 66 (Note: Includes those accused of stabbing (48), accused of vehicular (8), accused of shooting (8), accused of incendiary (2).) killed in unclear circumstances. In such circumstances Israel accused the Palestinians of committing a crime, but Ma'an determined there was no evidence for the Israeli allegation - no injuries, no outside witnesses. In some cases Ma'an found witnesses who contradicted the Israeli allegations. In other cases, Ma'an reported Israel planted knives or otherwise manipulated the scene of the crime.
- 5 killed in Israeli airstrikes
- 5 Palestinian bystanders killed

The Guardian reported over 200 Palestinians killed, including 130 who allegedly carried out attacks.

== Incitement ==
During the period of unrest, what role incitement played in triggering Palestinians to commit attacks against Israelis was debated. Israeli officials frequently blamed Palestinian leaders and organizations for incitement. Abbas was most often blamed, but many others such as Hamas, the Islamic Movement in Israel, Arab Israeli politicians, imams, Swedish Foreign Minister Margot Wallström, and UN Secretary-General Ban Ki-moon were also accused of encouraging or inciting violence.

A different source of incitement was social media. Several Palestinians were arrested over what they had posted online.

=== By Abbas and the Palestinian Authority ===
Netanyahu and other prominent Israeli politicians repeatedly alleged that Abbas was inciting Palestinians. For example, in October 2015, Netanyahu said that "there is no question that this wave of attacks was driven directly by the incitement, the incitement of Hamas, the incitement of the Islamist movement in Israel and the incitement, I am sorry to say, from president Abbas and the Palestinian Authority." His Education Minister, Naftali Bennett, claimed in an interview with BBC that Abbas was "inciting murder of Jews."

American politicians, such as Secretary of State John Kerry and the Chairman of the House Foreign Affairs Committee Eliot Engel, also accused Abbas of incitement.

Analysts, however, doubted that Abbas was inciting the violence. According to Mouin Rabbani, a senior fellow at the Institute for Palestine Studies think tank, "Abbas couldn't even incite a rabid dog" because, according to him, Abbas was a leader without authority or influence. According to Shin Bet, the violence was incited by the Islamic Movement in Israel and Hamas and not Abbas, who they claimed instructed his security forces to prevent attacks on Israelis.

Social media expert Shimrit Meir believed that Abbas was encouraging violence, but that no one was listening to him because of his unpopularity.

Abbas denied all allegations of incitement. In an interview sent on Israeli TV in March 2016 he claimed that Palestinian security forces were trying to prevent attacks. He proceeded to describe a raid of a school where they had found "70 boys and girls who were carrying knives. We talked to them about it and told them it was a mistake. 'We don't want you to kill and die. We want you to live and the other to live.'"

=== By the Islamic Movement ===
The Islamic Movement in Israel, founders of the two Temple Mount groups the Murabitat and Mourabitoun, was claimed to be a major source of incitement. The Israeli government accused it of "continuous incitement to violence and racism" by accusing Israel of seeking to change the Temple Mount "status quo." The northern branch of the movement was outlawed in November 2015.

According to the Shin Bet and Israeli police, the movement was affiliated with the Muslim brotherhood and had ties with Hamas.

=== By Hamas ===
A Shin Bet senior officer said that much of the incitement came from Hamas.

=== By the Islamic State ===
According to Algemeiner analysis published in January 2016,

While the threat of border clashes with Islamic State terrorists fighting in the Syrian civil war has concerned Israeli leaders for some time now, the recruitment of Israeli Arabs to form their own terror cells or launch lone wolf attacks inside of Israel – akin to the Paris or San Bernardino attacks late in 2015 – has recently become a more serious threat for the Jewish state.

According to a cyber-security expert opinion of INSS, a new trend started during the "wave of terror" in Israel, with the Islamic State organization flooding social media platforms with messages tailored to Palestinians and Israeli Arabs.

Shin Bet claimed that the attackers who killed four people at Tel Aviv tourist attraction were inspired by the Islamic State . Reportedly, this confirmed the assessment, previously made by Palestinian security services on the night of the attack. Following the June 2016 Tel Aviv shooting, Israeli newspaper "Haaretz", wrote that first signs emerged of ISIS-inspired lone-wolf terrorism in Israel.

=== By individuals ===
According to a report by the Palestinian Detainees and Ex-detainees Committee, Israel arrested about 130 Palestinians over social media activity in 2015. 27 of those detained were accused of incitement.

In October 2015, it was reported that 20,000 Israelis had initiated a class action suit against Facebook who they claimed had a "legal and moral obligation" to block content "containing incitement to murder Jews."

On 15 October, the Jewish non-governmental organization ADL wrote in a blog post that content encouraging Palestinians to stab Jews had emerged on social media. As examples of such content, it described an image with the text "When you stab, put poison on the knife or soak the knife in vinegar," a tweet that read "Stab a soldier with a knife to liberate Palestine" and a YouTube video captioned "Learn how to stab a Jew."

Deputy Foreign Minister Tzipi Hotovely said it was her dream "to see the Israeli flag flying on the Temple Mount." Netanyahu rebuked the comment.

== Timeline ==
Since 13 September, 36 Israelis, as well as two Americans and an Eritrean were killed in Palestinian attacks, while 222 Palestinians have been killed (all but one by Israeli security forces), of which 140 were identified by Israel as assailants. Additionally, a Sudanese attacker was killed. The Israel Defense Forces (IDF) recorded 167 'terrorist' attacks by Palestinians against Israeli civilians and security forces.

=== July 2015 ===
On 31 July 2015, two homes in Duma, a Palestinian village in the West Bank, were firebombed by Israeli settlers. An 18-month-old baby was burnt to death and his parents and 4-year-old brother were critically injured and rushed to hospitals, where the father died of his burns several days later. In early September the mother also succumbed to her injuries.

=== September 2015 ===
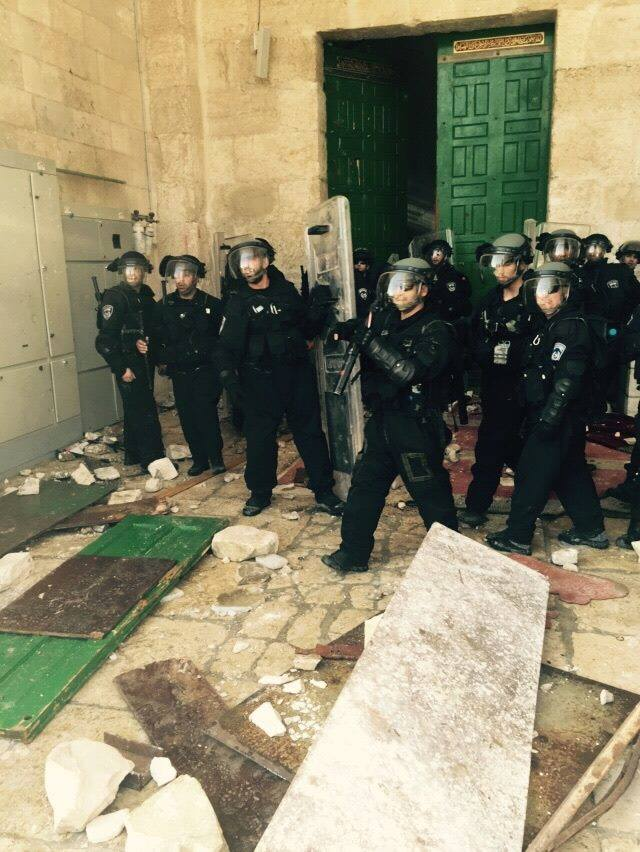
Israeli policemen during riots in the Temple Mount, September 2015

On 9 September, after talks with visiting British Prime Minister David Cameron, Jordan's King Abdullah II warned Israel, on 9 September, that "any more provocation in Jerusalem will affect the relationship between Jordan and Israel."

On 9 September, US State Department spokesman John Kirby, condemned "all acts of violence" at the Temple Mount and urged Israel not to lift restrictions for Jewish visitors or to disturb the "status quo" of the site.

On 13 September, Muslim youths gathered at the al-Aqsa Mosque compound, with the intention of blocking visits by Jews to the area. They clashed with Israeli police who used rubber coated bullets and tear gas, and chained the doors of the mosque shut. Tensions on the Temple Mount continued for three days, causing damage as Israeli police used tear gas and threw stun grenades toward Palestinian youths barricaded inside the mosque, hurling rocks and flares at police, a Reuters witness said. Israeli Public Security Minister Gilad Erdan, in a statement, said the Palestinians also had pipe bombs.

On 13 September, Alexander Levlovich who was driving in a Jerusalem neighborhood was killed by Palestinians who threw stones at his car. This caused him to lose control of his car and crash into a utility pole.

On 16 September, Abbas declared his support for Palestinian youths injured in clashes on the Temple Mount, stating that "every drop of blood spilled in Jerusalem is pure, every shahid [martyr] will reach paradise, and every injured person will be rewarded by God." This led United States' Secretary of State John Kerry to accuse Abbas of inciting violence.

On 22 September, Hadeel al-Hashlamon was shot multiple times by an Israeli soldier at a checkpoint in Hebron. The IDF claimed that she had a knife on her. Amnesty published a report a few days later in which it called the incident an extrajudicial killing because Hashlamon didn't pose a threat when she was killed. In the following weeks, Hebron became a center of violent incidents and protests.

On 24 September the Security Cabinet of Israel approved new anti-riot laws. A modified order allowed security forces to shoot when the life of a third party is under threat. Before the change, Israeli soldiers facing rioters could open fire with live bullets only if their own life was in danger. The cabinet also ordered a minimum four-year jail term for anybody throwing dangerous objects and heavy fines on parents whose children threw stones as a temporary measure to be in effect for three years. A pay increase for border police throughout Jerusalem and the calling up reserve forces of police and Border Guard forces was also enacted by the security cabinet. Saeb Erekat, secretary general of the PLO, said that the new rules was "a mere pretext to justify the escalating Israeli crimes against the people of Palestine."

=== October 2015 ===
UN OCHA map of East Jerusalem showing movement restrictions by Israel in October 2015

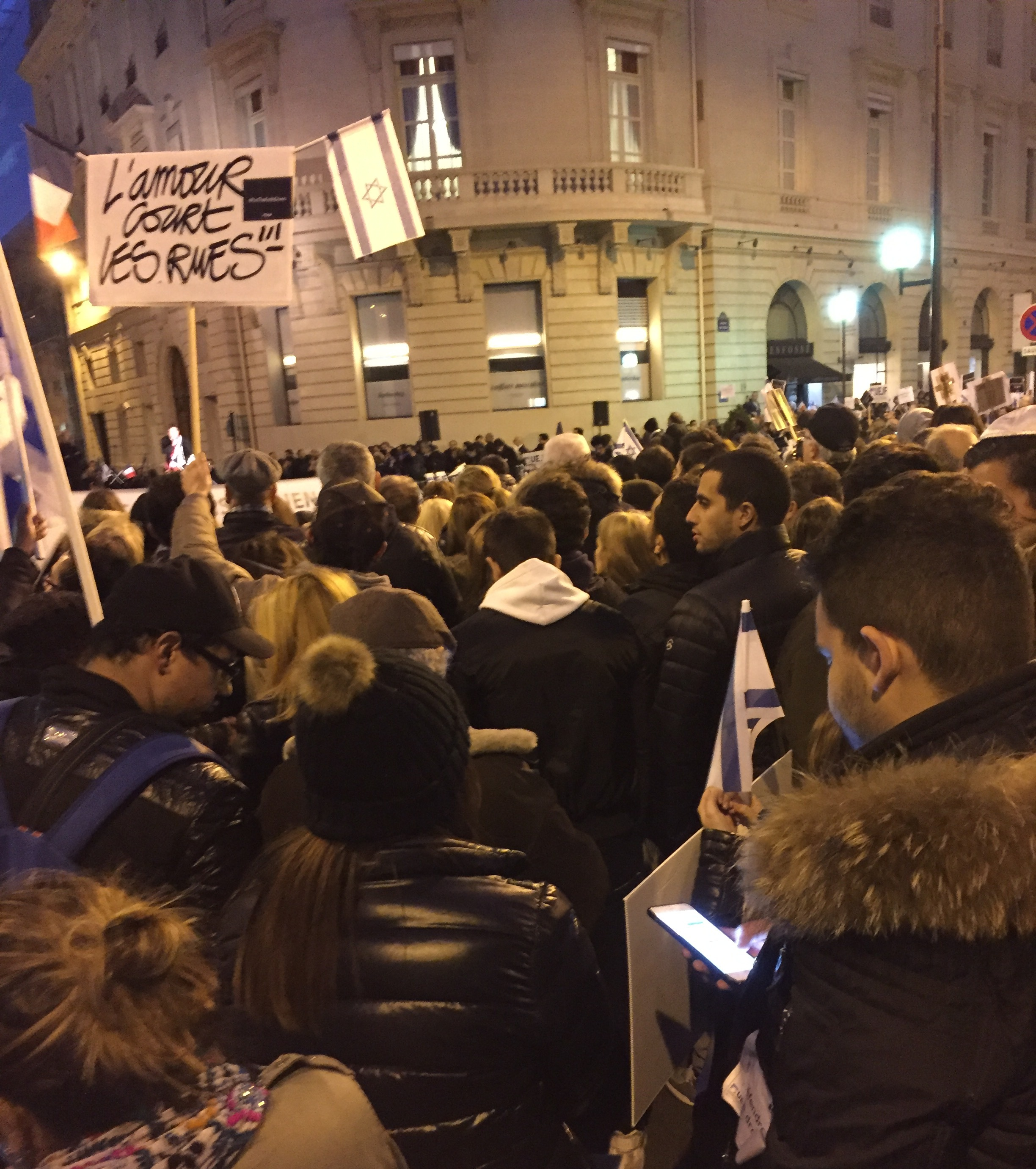
Pro–Israel rally in Paris, 18 October 2015

69 Palestinians were killed in clashes with Israeli security forces in October. Of those, 51 were killed in the West Bank and 18 in the Gaza Strip. The IDF claimed that 43 of the Palestinians killed were attackers. 7,392 Palestinians were injured. 7,392 Palestinians were injured; 4,216 by tear gas inhalation, 1,753 by rubber bullets, 1,134 by live ammunition and 289 from other causes. In the same period, ten Israelis were killed, and 115 injured. During the month over 300 Israeli soldiers were deployed in Jerusalem in the largest military policing operation since the Second Intifada.

On 1 October, Hamas militants killed two settlers from the West Bank. Netanyahu said that the attack was a "result of Palestinian incitement" that led "to an act of terror and murder" and criticized Abbas for not condemning the attack. The Al-Aqsa Martyrs' Brigades, Fatah's military arm, welcomed the attack and said it was "a worthy response" to the Duma arson attack in July.

On 3 October, a Palestinian stabbed and killed two Israelis in the Old City of Jerusalem before he himself was shot and killed by Israeli police. The attack caused controversy as BBC used the headline "Palestinian shot dead after Jerusalem attack kills two," apparently focusing more on the killed attacker rather than on his victims. The headline outraged the Israeli government which demanded an apology from the BBC. It warned that the network could face sanctions, threatening to annul its press cards in Israel, which in effect would have made it impossible for it to operate in the country. The network admitted that the headline was bad but said that it was written by a junior editor and not reflective of anti-Israeli bias. The headline was subsequently changed several times by the BBC.

On 4 October, Palestinians except for those living in Jerusalem, businessmen and students were banned from entering the Old City for two days. Men under the age of 50 were also banned from praying at al-Aqsa. Israelis or foreign tourists were not affected by the ban. The move angered Palestinians and was condemned by Amnesty as a violation of the right to freedom of movement.

On 8 October, Israel's Prime Minister Benjamin Netanyahu announced that he had barred Israeli ministers and other politicians in Israel's parliament, the Knesset, from visiting the Temple Mount. The decision was criticized both by Jewish and Arab politicians who said that they would defy his orders. Other politicians such as Isaac Herzog of the opposition party the Zionist Union welcomed the ban. Netanyahu also reiterated that his government had no intention of changing the Temple Mount "status quo."

On 12 October, two Palestinian boys Hassan and Ahmad Manasra stabbed two Israelis in East Jerusalem. The attack became a lightning rod for both Israelis and Palestinians because of the young age of the attackers, a viral clip from after the attack showing Ahmad laying in a pool of blood while being shouted at by settlers which spread on social media, and because Abbas erroneously claimed in a televised speech that Ahmad had been executed.

On 16 October, the French newspaper Le Figaro revealed that the French government was drafting a Security Council statement calling for the deployment of international observers to Temple Mount to preserve status quo. The Israeli government rebuffed the proposal and Israel's envoy to the UN, Danny Danon, said that Israel would never agree to the stationing of international forces at the site.

On 17 October, Jibril Rajoub, a senior member of Palestinian Authority ruling party Fatah said about the attacks that "they require heroism, courage, and a value system, which forces the Palestinian elite and the Palestinian national forces to see in the final words of one of those heroes, written in a blog, a document that could be taught in schools in a lesson about the meaning of martyrdom..."

On 18 October, an Israeli Bedouin shot and killed an Israeli soldier in a bus station in Beersheba before he was killed by security personnel. An Eritrean asylum seeker, mistaken for a second gunman, was shot by police and then lynched by a mob which was filmed by a bystander. He later died of his wounds.

Leaders of the Israeli Bedouin community condemned the attack, while ISIS, who the attacker thought to have been inspired by, praised it. It was the first attack of the conflict committed by a Bedouin.

Netanyahu warned Israelis against vigilantism and Human Rights Watch called for prosecution against those involved in the lynching.

On 20 October, Israeli troops rearrested Hassan Yousef, a senior Hamas figure in the West Bank, accusing him of "fermenting violence and conflict against Israel among the Palestinian public."

On 20 October, UN Secretary-General Ban Ki-moon made a surprise visit to Israel and called for both sides to restore calm.

On 21 October, Chancellor of Germany Angela Merkel met with Netanyahu on to discuss the violence. She said that Germany expected Abbas "to condemn everything that constitutes an act of terror. One can't have open talks with Israel if this does not happen" and that "young Palestinians need a perspective and unilateral steps are not helpful".

On 24 October the US House Foreign Affairs Committee voted to cut financial aid to the Palestinian Authority by $80 million to "send a message" to Abbas to end the "incitement." The Chairman of the Committee, Eliot Engel, said that the unrest was "the product of years and years of anti-Israel propaganda and indoctrination – some of which has been actively promoted by Palestinian Authority officials and institutions."

==== Speculations about a Third Intifada ====
During October, analysts speculated on whether the unrest was, or would lead to, a Third Intifada – an organized uprising against the Israeli occupation. On 9 October, Ismail Haniyeh, leader of Hamas, declared that a new intifada had begun, but other Palestinian leaders refrained from following suit. Analysts questioned whether they would be able to contain the violence.

According to Israeli opposition leader Isaac Herzog, who thought the events would lead to a Third Intifada, the Palestinian Authority tried to avoid an explosion "but on the ground, there's not much effect ... young people definitely aren't listening." According to Nohad Ali, a sociologist from the University of Haifa, there wasn't "yet" a Third Intifada. Other analysts noted that the unrest was different from previous Intifadas because it lacked both an organizational framework under an acknowledged political leadership and a clear set of goals. It was also noted that the violence was mainly restricted to Palestinians of East Jerusalem, and did not reflect general participation from the West Bank as in earlier Intifadas.

Grant Rumley of the Foundation for the Defense of Democracies argued that because there was little Palestinian political endorsement of the violence, the chance of another uprising was low; "the likelihood of another uprising is roughly the same as it is on any other day in this blood-soaked conflict."

=== November 2015 ===
On 23 November, two Palestinian girls, 14-year-old Hadeel Wajih Awwad from Qalandiya and her 16-year-old cousin Norhan Awwad from Kafr 'Aqab stabbed a man with a pair of scissors at the Mahane Yehuda Market on Jaffa Street in central Jerusalem who suffered light injuries to his neck. The victim turned out to be a 70-year-old Palestinian man from Bethlehem who the girls had mistaken for a Jew. The attack was stopped by a bystander who hit the older girl with a chair that knocked her to the ground. The younger girl then advanced on a policeman in the street while brandishing her scissors. The policeman killed her by shooting her several times even after she had slumped to the ground from the first shot. He also fired two shots into the motionless older girls chest. She sustained serious wounds and underwent surgery to remove the bullets from her abdomen.

The killed girl's brother, Mahmoud Awwad, 22, had been shot in the head by an Israeli sniper during clashes near Qalandiya in 2013. He died five months later. According to the indictment against Norhan, the attack was meant to avenge his death. She was sentenced to 13 and a half years in prison and fined 30,000 shekels.

The attack caused some outrage as the killing of Hadeel was caught on security camera footage. In an open letter to Netanyahu, the Israeli human rights organization B'Tselem claimed that it was an example of an extrajudicial killing, noting that "the death penalty for murder was abolished in Israeli criminal law in 1954, over 60 years ago." Kerry, on the other hand, alluding to the attack, defended Israel "Clearly, no people anywhere should live with daily violence; with attacks in the streets, with knives or scissors or cars."

=== December 2015 ===
In early December during a debate in the Swedish parliament, Swedish Foreign Minister Margot Wallström discussed the ongoing spate of violence in Israel and the Occupied territories. She accused Israel of extrajudicial killings, executing attackers without trial, and of disproportionate use of force. She also condemned the Palestinian attacks and said that Israel had the right to defend itself.

The comments infuriated the Israeli Foreign Ministry who calling her words "scandalous, delusional, rude and detached from reality. The foreign minister suggests that Israeli citizens simply give their necks to the murderers trying to stab them with knives" and that "the citizens of Israel have to deal with terrorism that receives support from irresponsible and false statements like that."

On 12 January, Wallström again suggested that Israel might be guilty of extrajudicial killings of Palestinians and called for an investigation into the matter. The Israeli Foreign Ministry again responded harshly, claiming that Wallström's "irresponsible and delirious statements are giving support to terrorism and encouraging violence". Deputy Foreign Minister of Israel Tzipi Hotovely declared that Swedish politicians of the rank of deputy minister and above are not welcome in Israel. She later clarified that it was only the Foreign Minister and her aides what were not welcome.

On 9 December it was revealed that US Presidential candidate Donald Trump would visit Israel and meet with Netanyahu on 28 December. Netanyahu was criticized for not cancelling the meeting because Trump a few days earlier had called for a banning Muslims from entering the US. 37 MKs asked Netanyahu to condemn Trump and refuse to meet with him.

Netanyahu in response said he rejected Trump's remarks about Muslims but that the meeting was planned two weeks ago and would go forward as planned. Trump, however, postponed the meeting until "after I become President" and later hinted that Netanyahu's negative response to the "Muslim ban" was the reason.

=== January 2016 ===
In January, the UN Secretary-General Ban Ki-moon said that the Palestinian attacks were driven by a "profound sense of alienation and despair" and that "it is human nature to react to occupation, which often serves as a potent incubator of hate and extremism." He condemned the attacks but also said that Israel's settlement program, under which 153 new settler homes had recently been approved, cast doubt on its commitment to the creation of a Palestinian state.

Netanyahu responded harshly to the criticism and accused Ban of "encouraging terror," adding that Palestinians "do not murder for peace and they do not murder for human rights."

Ban in response to Netanyahu's accusation wrote an op-ed published in The New York Times titled "Don't Shoot the Messenger, Israel.". In it he wrote that he would "always stand up to those who challenge Israel's right to exist" but that "when heartfelt concerns about short-sighted or morally damaging policies emanate from so many sources, including Israel's closest friends, it cannot be sustainable to keep lashing out at every well-intentioned critic." He also called for "Israelis, Palestinians and the international community" to recognize that the status quo is untenable and that "keeping another people under indefinite occupation undermines the security and the future of both Israelis and Palestinians."

On 29 January, French Foreign Minister Laurent Fabius announced an international peace conference to try and jump start an Israeli-Palestinian peace process. If the negotiations were unsuccessful, France would formally recognize the State of Palestine.

While the Palestinians, and later also the Arab League, welcomed the "French initiative," the Israeli government rejected it, with one official sardonically asking "Perhaps France will push for peace process with ISIS next?" Netanyahu later clarified that he would prefer to hold direct talks with Abbas, without the involvement of the international community.

Since Israel announced that it would not participate, the conference was to be held without any Palestinian or Israeli presence. First it was planned to be held on 30 May, but due to scheduling problems, it was postponed several times. It was eventually held in January 2017.

=== February 2016 ===
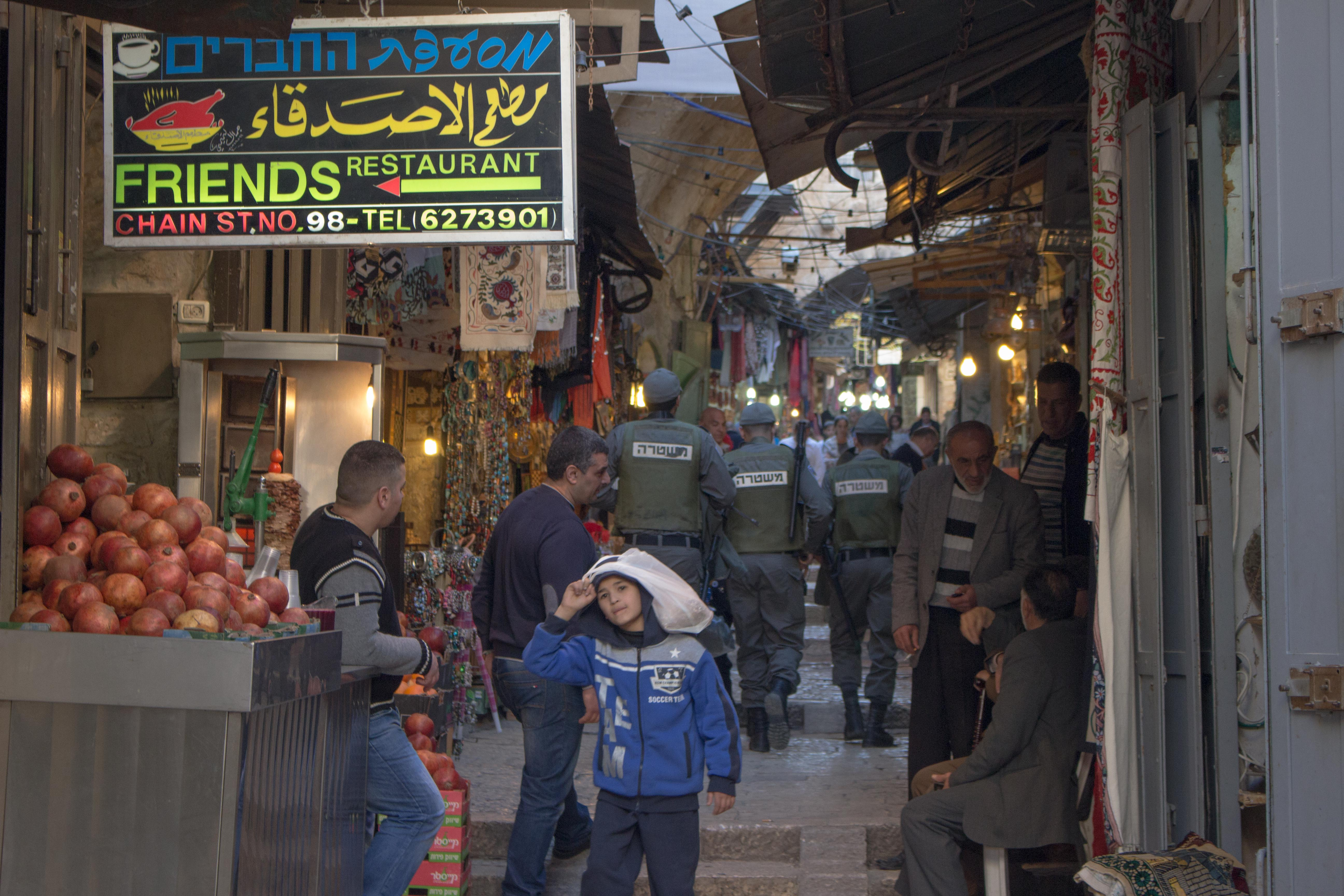
Israeli police on patrol in Jerusalem's Old City, February 2016

In early February three Arab Israeli members of the Knesset (MK) from the Joint List met with families of Palestinian attackers who had been killed by Israeli security forces. The three politicians claimed that the purpose of the meeting was to secure the release of the attackers bodies for burial. Israel often delays returning the bodies of attackers to their respective families, until they confirm the funerals will not be used to incite violence against Israelis.

The meeting outraged other politicians in the predominantly Jewish Knesset. It was heavily criticized by both Netanyahu and the opposition leader Isaac Herzog who said that the MKs "crossed a red line." The Ethics Committee of the Knesset suspended the three Arab Israeli MKs who had participated in the meeting; Hanin Zoabi, Basel Ghattas, and Jamal Zahalka.

In response to the meeting between the Arab Israeli MKs and the Palestinian families, Netanyahu proposed new legislation allowing for three-quarters of the Knesset (90 of 120 members) to vote to expel an MK. The controversial "Expulsion law" was passed in July 2016 and allowed for the expulsion of an MK found guilty of either inciting racism or supporting an armed struggle against Israel.

On 17 February, nine American congressmen and Senator Patrick Leahy wrote a letter to the US State Department inquiring about "specific allegations of gross violations of human rights" by the security forces of Egypt and Israel. They asked the State Department to determine whether the reports were credible and if so whether they would trigger the Leahy Law, a law that can cause the suspension of military aid to countries found guilty of human rights violations.

Netanyahu responded angrily when he became aware of the letter's existence on 30 March. He defended the IDF by saying that "the IDF and the Israel Police do not engage in executions" and adding that "this letter should have been addressed instead to those who incite youngsters to commit cruel acts of terrorism."

=== March 2016 ===
Between 23 February and 4 April, 22 Palestinians were killed, of which two were in the Gaza Strip, while 518 were injured. In March, one American was killed and 26 Israelis were injured. The Shin Bet recorded four attacks from the Gaza Strip; two rocket launches in which a total of five rockets were shot and two small arms shootings. 117 attacks in the West Bank and Jerusalem; six shootings of which two occurred in Jerusalem, 9 I.E.D,, six stabbings of which one occurred in Jerusalem, two vehicular attacks, one attempted attack and 92 firebomb attacks (33 in Jerusalem).

On 8 March, a US tourist, Taylor Force, was killed and ten other people injured when a Palestinian man attacked people in Tel Aviv. The Taylor Force Act, American legislation to stop economic aid to the Palestinian Authority until it stops paying stipends to individuals who commit acts of terrorism, was named in his honor.

Also on 8 March, two Israeli police officers were wounded by an Arab gunman in Jerusalem and an Israeli man was moderately wounded in a stabbing attack in Petah Tikva. The victim managed to remove the knife from his neck and stabbed the attacker to death.

On 24 March, two Palestinians stabbed and wounded an Israeli soldier in Hebron and were subsequently shot. One died immediately and the other remained badly wounded. A video published by B'tselem showed a soldier aiming his weapon at the motionless attacker lying on the ground, and shooting him in the head. The video went viral on Israeli social media, sparking controversy.

=== April 2016 ===
In April the US State Department released its annual report into human rights abuses around the world. The report accused Israeli forces of "excessive use of force" and "arbitrary arrest and associated torture and abuse, often with impunity," by the IDF, the Palestinian Authority, and Hamas and claimed that there were numerous reports of Israeli forces killing Palestinians when they did not pose a threat to life. It also criticized the Palestinian Authority for not condemning incidents of antisemitism and for hailing attackers who died while committing as martyrs.

=== June 2016 ===
On 8 June, two Palestinian gunmen opened fire at a cafe in Tel Aviv, killing four people and injuring seven others. The attackers claimed in the investigation that they were inspired by the Islamic State and Hamas. In response to the attack, the Israeli government suspended 83,000 Palestinian entry permits to visit families in Israel for Ramadan, a move that was described as "collective punishment" by Knesset member Haneen Zoabi and U.N. High Commissioner for Human Rights Zeid Ra'ad Al Hussein. The IDF imposed a closure over the entire West Bank and the Gaza Strip in the wake of the attack, which was scheduled to end on 11 June after the end of Jewish holiday of Shavuot. Palestinian Media, Hamas and PIJ celebrated the attack.

On 30 June, a Palestinian stabbed and killed 17-year-old Hallel Yaffa Ariel while she was sleeping in her bedroom in the West Bank settlement of Kiryat Arba. The assailant was fatally shot by security guards. That same day, a Palestinian assailant stabbed two Israeli civilians in Netanya, north of Tel Aviv and was shot dead by an armed civilian. On 1 July, Palestinian gunmen fired at an Israeli family's vehicle south to Hebron causing it to flip over. The father of the family died while his wife and two daughters were injured. PIJ said in a statement that: "the escalation in attacks against settlers reflects the persistence of the Palestinian intifada to continue".

Throughout June 2016, 5 Israelis and 6 Palestinians were killed, while 21–30 Israelis and 167 Palestinians were wounded. The Shin Bet recorded 1 attack from the Gaza Strip (small arms shooting), 100 attacks from the West Bank and East Jerusalem: 10 I.E.D (Pipe bombs and an improvised grenade); 2 small arms shootings; 1 stabbing; 1 vehicular and 86 firebomb (29 in Jerusalem) attacks, and 2 attacks inside the Green Line (in Tel Aviv and Natanya). 1 Jewish attack was recorded: Two vehicles were set on fire and three were sprayed with anti-Arab hate speech in Nazareth and Yafa an-Naseriyye (in northern Israel).

== See also ==
- 2014 Jerusalem unrest
- 2015 in Israel
- 2016 in Israel
- Palestinian political violence
- Temple Mount entry restrictions
