= Killing of Alexander Levlovich =

Alexander Levlovich (alt.: Levlovitz) was an Israeli who was killed in East Jerusalem on 13 September 2015, by Palestinians who hurled rocks at the car he was driving. He died in hospital the following day. Levlovich was the first casualty in the 2015-2016 wave of violence in Israeli-Palestinian conflict. The wave of violence began when Muslim youths gathered at the al-Aqsa Mosque, with the intention of blocking visits by Jews to the Temple Mount on the eve of the Rosh Hashanah holiday. The youths barricaded themselves inside the Mosque, hurling rocks and flares at police as the police used tear gas and threw stun grenades in an attempt to quell the violence. Social media campaigns rapidly spread news of the rioting, which quickly sparked rock-throwing and stabbing attacks in nearby neighborhoods.

== Attack ==
Levlovich (64), the manager of a home for disabled persons, was attacked while driving through the Armon Hanatziv neighborhood in East Jerusalem on his way home from a family Rosh Hashanah dinner. Stones hitting the car caused him to lose control and hit a utility pole. His two daughters, also in the car, were badly injured.

Israeli Prime Minister Binyamin Netanyahu responded by going to the site of the killing and declaring "war" on rock and petrol bomb throwers; "Here, in the heart of Jerusalem, at a traffic island on a main road, a thug and criminal stands here, on a traffic island, takes a rock and throws again and again at the windshields of cars of Jerusalem residents until he manages to cause death - it did not kill, it murdered."

=== Convictions ===
All 4 perpetrators confessed to having committed this crime. 5 men were convicted of throwing the rocks that killed Levlovich.

Abed Dawiat (Mahmoud Abed Rabbo Doiat), 19 at the time of the crime, was convicted of manslaughter for throwing rocks that resulted in death. It was the longest sentence every given by an Israeli court for a stoning attack. Dawiat claimed that as he threw the rocks that killed Levlovich, he was wearing a Hamas flag given to him at a demonstration in which he participated protesting Israel's banning of the activist group Murabitat from the Temple Mount. The signing of an order declaring the Murabitat illegal by Defense Minister Moshe Yaalon on 8 September 2015 is regarded as sparking the 2015-2016 wave of violence in Israeli-Palestinian conflict.

Co-defendants Muhammad Abu Salah, 19, Fares Mostafa Walid Atrash, 19, and a fourth, whose name was not revealed because he was a minor, plead guilty and were found by the court to have participated in the stoning of Levlovich's car.

Dawiat has also been convicted of throwing firebombs at Israeli police in 2014.

The family home of Abed Dawiat, (17,) who found by the court to have personally thrown the rocks that hit Levlovich's car, was demolished by order of the court.

As of march, 2018, Interior Minister Arye Deri was considering stripping Dawait of his right to reside in East Jerusalem under a new law permitting the revocation of residency for individuals involved in terrorist activity.

== Impact ==
In the immediate wake of the killing, Prime Minister Binyamin Netanyahu announced that they would "use all necessary means" to "combat stone-throwers, those who hurl Molotov cocktails, and those who detonate pipe bombs and shoot fireworks with the aim of doing harm to police and civilians." Stating that "We will institute a system-wide change and set a new standard of deterrence and prevention." Levlovich's death caused Israel's Security Cabinet to act on the long-simmering issue of violent and deadly stone-throwing attacks by Palestinian youths. On 24 September 2015, the Security Cabinet enacted new measures against the throwing of rocks and of Molotov cocktails. The new regulations permit police to use Ruger rifles firing .22-caliber bullets, and to open fire when there is “an immediate and concrete danger” to civilians exists, or when the lives of security officers are threatened. In addition, Israel will revoke child support benefits for underage youth serving time in prison.

In addition, legislation was proposed in September 2015 to impose minimum terms of four years in prison — with a maximum term of 20 years — on adults who throw rocks, throw firebombs, or who shoot fireworks aimed directly at human beings. Higher fines are to be imposed on youths between the ages of 14 and 18, and also on their parents.

Arguing for passage of legislation that would enable courts to impose life sentences on terrorists, Justice Minister Ayelet Shaked pointed out that the killers who threw rocks at Alexander Levlovich's car on Rosh Hashana, were indicted for manslaughter, not murder, because existing law demands proof that a murder was premeditated.
