= SAMED =

SAMED, short for Palestine Martyrs Works Society (Arabic: جمعية أعمال شهداء فلسطين, romanized: Jamʿiyyat aʿmāl šuhadāʾ Filasṭīn), is the economic institution of the PLO. It represents the PLO at economic conferences in Arab countries. SAMED is also involved in the political, cultural, and social fields.

For many years, SAMED handled the distribution of cash compensation to the families of martyrs killed in attacks on Israel, payments now handled by the Palestinian Authority Martyr's Fund.

SAMED was set up by the PLO as a front company, a commercial and manufacturing entity. Most SAMED workshops were then in the refugee camps in northern Lebanon. Since then its activities have expanded.

Following its establishment, SAMED operated across the spaces of Palestinian exile while it maintained a global reach beyond Palestinian refugee camps, namely with workshops and collaborations in other allied states, particularly in Africa. In the past, SAMED regularly published a scholarly economics journal called Samed al-Iqtisadi (SAMED Economist). The journal was part of a broader PLO-supported media landscape that included newspapers, radio, and film production.

== See also ==
- Palestine Securities Exchange
