= Temple Mount entry restrictions =

Restrictions on entering the Temple Mount in Jerusalem

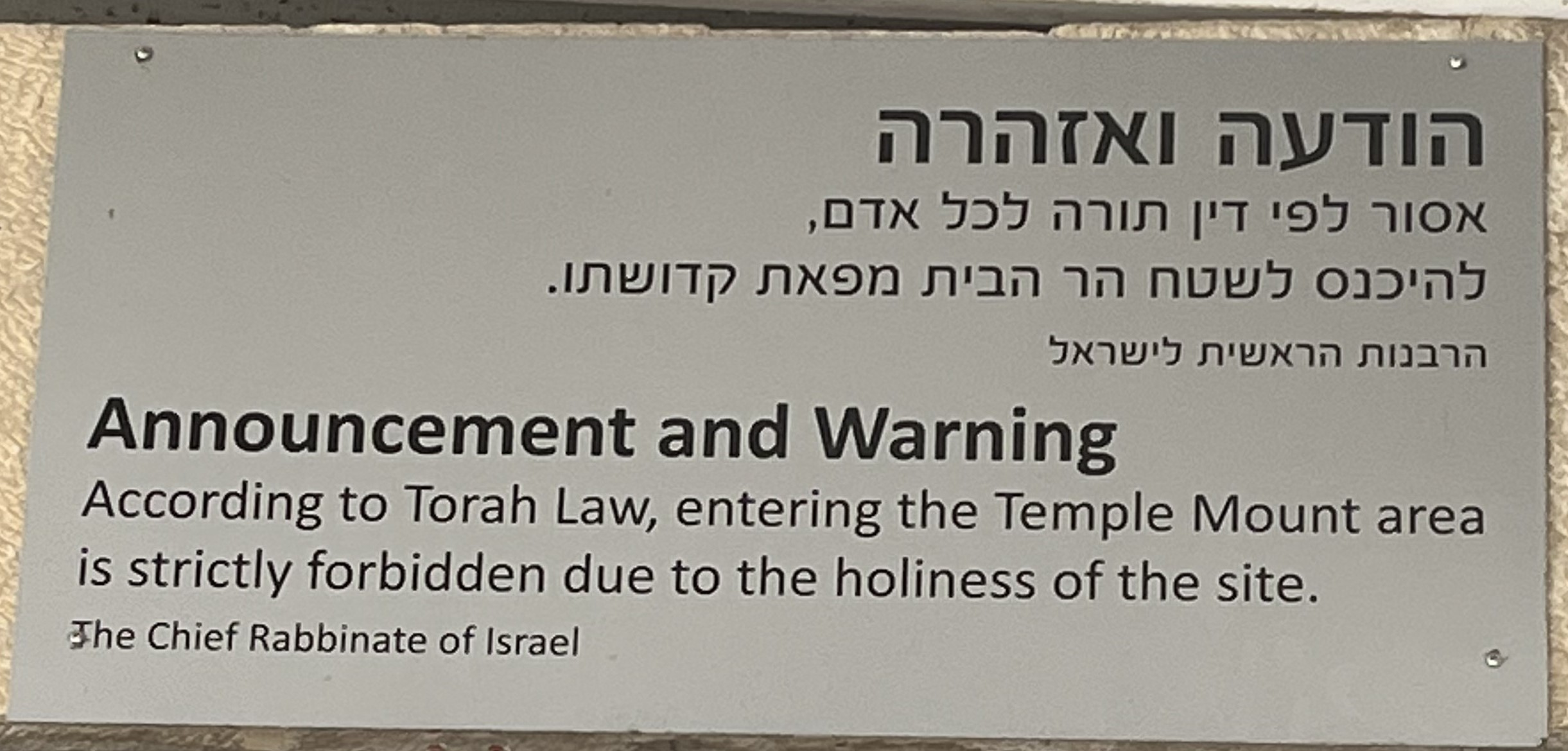
A sign by the Chief Rabbinate of Israel warns that entering the site goes against the Halakha (Jewish religious law).

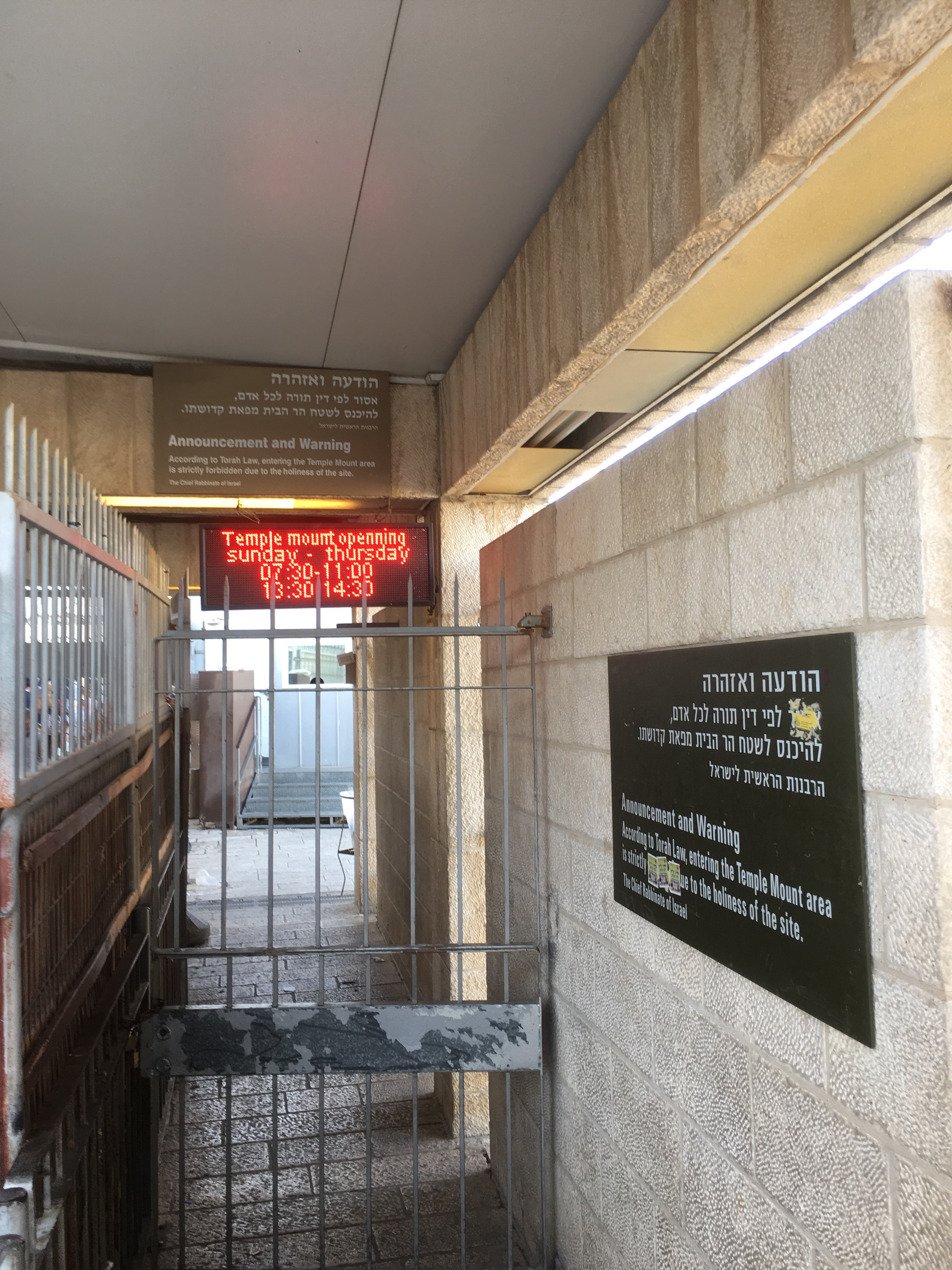
The entry restrictions for tourists, showing opening times and a Rabbinic warning.

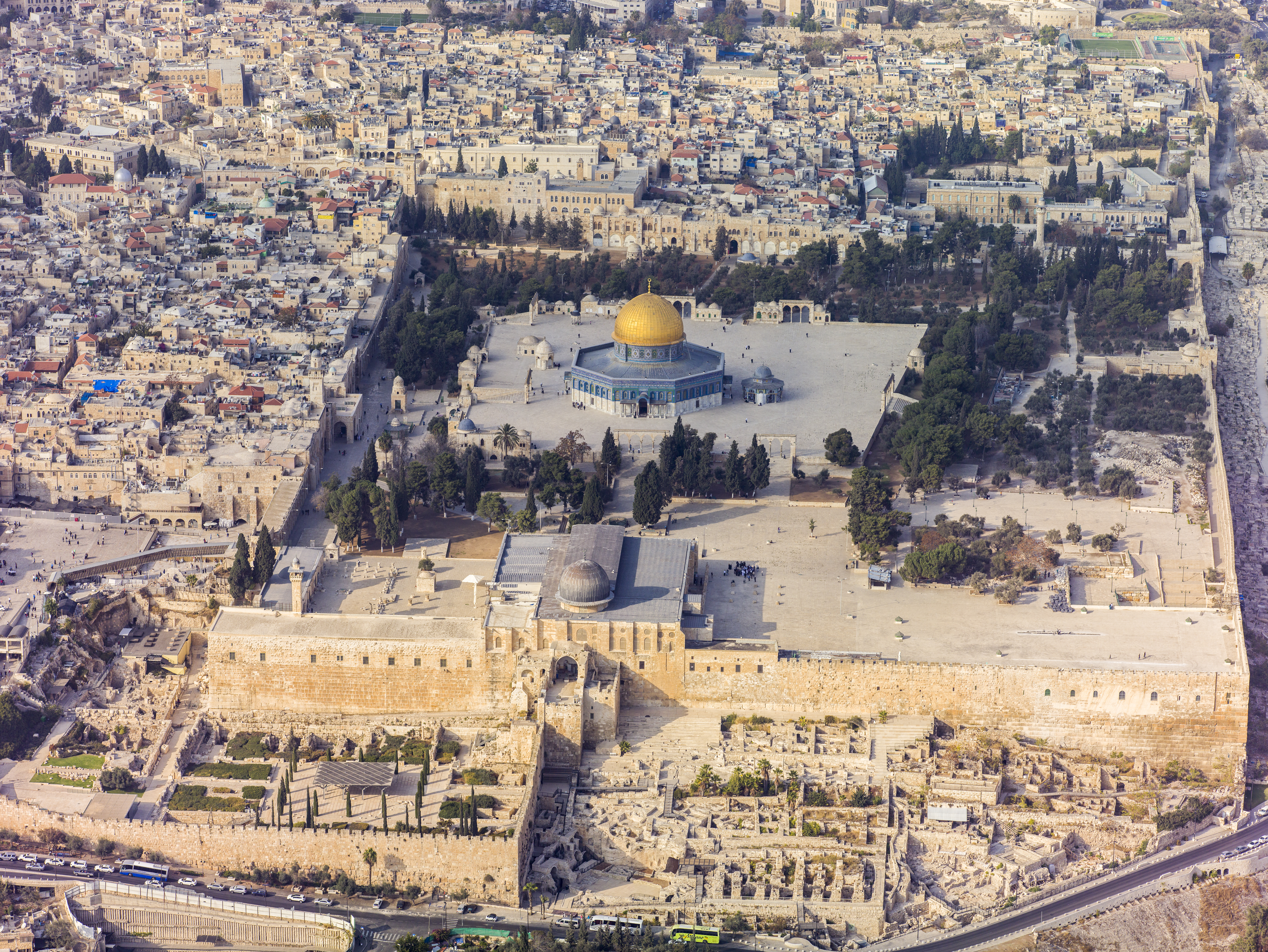
A view of Temple Mount from south side

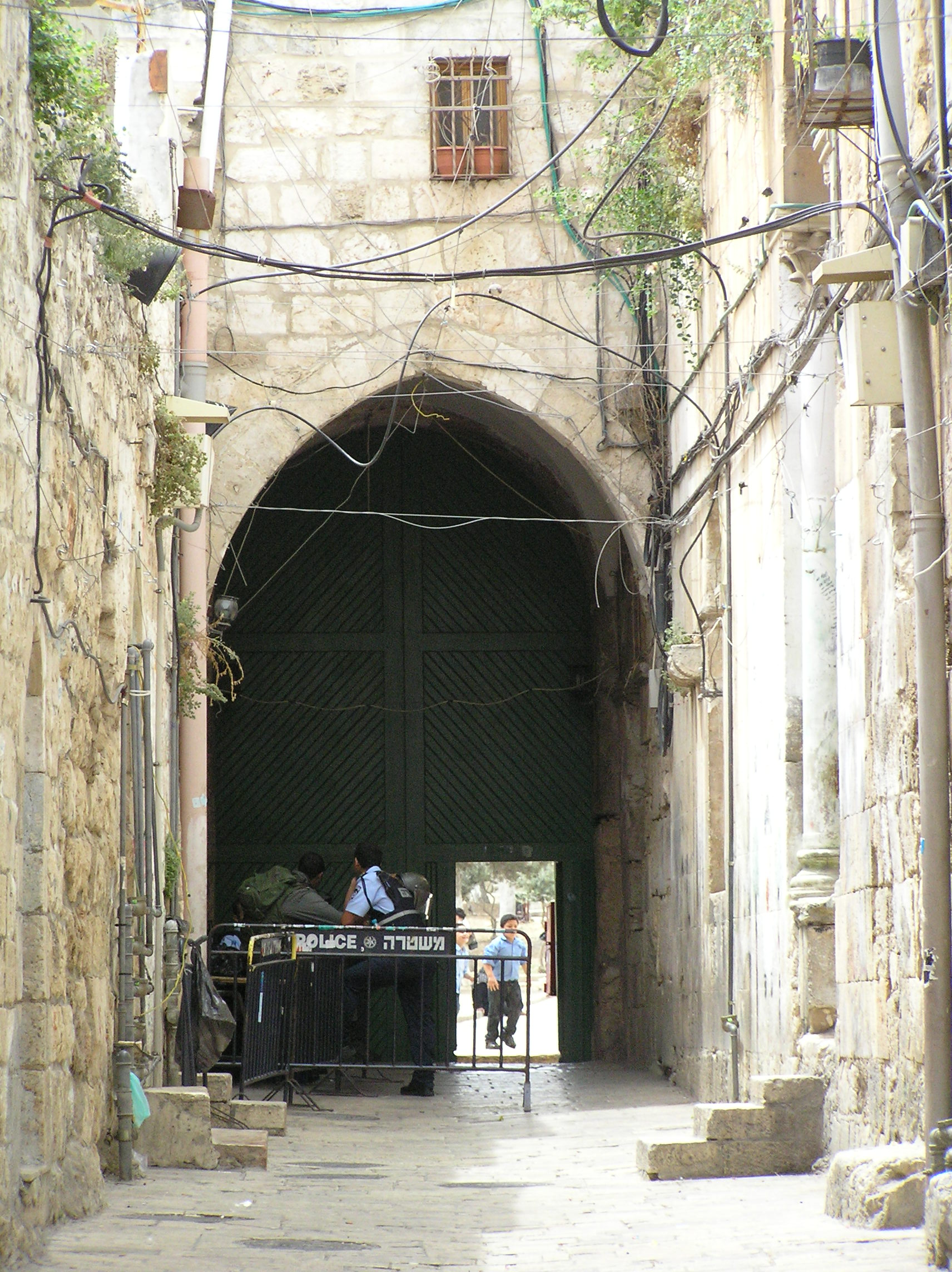
Israeli Police guard an entrance to the Temple Mount

Throughout history, the Temple Mount in Jerusalem has been subject to entry restrictions on the basis of religious affiliation. These restrictions have varied depending on the time period and the authority in power. Like the rest of the Holy Land, the site holds great significance in Judaism, Christianity, and Islam, among other Abrahamic religions.

Under the Ottoman Empire, there was an absolute ban on non-Muslim entry to the Temple Mount before the Tanzimat, which was a period of liberal reformation that began in 1839 and continued until 1876. Following the Tanzimat, non-Muslims were allowed to enter the site as long as they requested a special permit from the Ottoman authorities. Under the British Mandate for Palestine, the British government was prohibited by the League of Nations from interfering with the Ottoman-era "Status Quo" and the Jordanian Hashemite custodianship continued to exercise administrative control over Christian and Muslim sites throughout Jerusalem, with non-Muslim access to the Temple Mount still requiring special permission.

During the 1948 Arab–Israeli War, Jerusalem was divided, with Israel capturing West Jerusalem and Jordan capturing East Jerusalem, including the Old City. Under Jordan, the present-day Jerusalem Islamic Waqf was established and non-Muslim access to the Temple Mount remained limited; Jews and Israelis (incl. Muslims with Israeli citizenship) were banned from entering the site entirely. During the 1967 Arab–Israeli War, Israel captured all of Jerusalem, but kept the Jordan-based Jerusalem Islamic Waqf in power of affairs concerning the Christian and Islamic sites there.

At present, Israel and Jordan continue to have administrative responsibility over the Temple Mount, with the Israeli government controlling entry and the Jerusalem Islamic Waqf managing what is known to Muslims as Al-Aqsa Mosque compound, which includes the Al-Aqsa Mosque. Jews and Christians are generally restricted from entering for extended periods and may only visit the site as tourists, as the Status Quo only permits Muslim prayer on the Temple Mount; Jewish entry restrictions are also dependent on the Chief Rabbinate of Israel, which holds the position that entering the site for prayer or worship goes against Judaic law. However, Israel also frequently prohibits Palestinian Muslims under the age of 55 from entering the site, which, according to Palestinian politician Mustafa Barghouti, makes more than 95% of the Palestinian populace ineligible. Due to widespread tension stemming from entry restrictions and religious activities, clashes between Israeli police and Palestinians are common at the Temple Mount, including at Al-Aqsa Mosque and the Dome of the Rock, among other sites.

== Under the Ottoman Empire (1517–1917) ==
For centuries an absolute ban on non-Muslim access to the Haram al-Sharif/Temple Mount existed. The situation was relatively free of tensions as Jews acquiesced in the exercise of Muslim authority over the site. In 1839, following the Tanzimat reforms in the Ottoman establishment and legislation, non-Muslims were permitted to enter Temple Mount, but in order to do so they had to obtain special permit from the governor. Jews who managed to obtain permission to visit the site at that time, such as Moses Montefiore and Baron Rothschild, had themselves carried across the site by Muslims, in order not to violate the rabbinic prohibition against Jews setting foot on the holy ground of the area.

== Under the British Mandate for Palestine (1920–1948) ==
Article 13 of the Mandatory Charter conferred on Britain by the League of Nations explicitly denied its governing body the right to either interfere with the site or the administration of purely Muslim holy places. Jewish requests for access to their holy places during the period of British rule of Palestine were focused on the Western Wall, not on the Temple Mount, which was, in any case, off-limits according to the Jewish prohibition against entering the latter. The struggle between Muslims and Jews was concentrated on the latter's desire to secure regulated access to the wall on the mount's western side. As early as 1920, rabbi Avraham Yitzhak ha-Kohen Kook stated that though in other hands, the Temple Mount would eventually come into Jewish possession, a declaration which was interpreted by the mufti Amin al-Husseini as evidence of a political plot to wrest control of the Haram itself. In the ensuing period, the Temple Mount became something of a "state within a state" which the British authorities would not enter even when it became the centre for the Arab Revolt, until the mufti fled the site. The King's Order-in-Council issued by the government authorities of Mandatory Palestine in 1934 regulated the legal situation of the site by confirming the religious status quo regarding sovereignty reigning from Ottoman times.

== Under Jordan (1948–1967) ==
At the conclusion of the 1948 Arab–Israeli War, the Haram al-Sharif lay behind the lines held by the Jordanian Legion, and the Jordanian government established the Jerusalem Islamic Waqf to administer the site. From 1948 until Israel captured the site in 1967 during the Six-Day War, Israeli Muslims were unable to enter East Jerusalem and access the Haram al-Sharif, a restriction at times imposed by the Israeli government.

== Under Israel (1967–present) ==
=== Jordanian Waqf ===
After Israel occupied the Old City of Jerusalem during the Six-Day War of June 1967, the site remained under the control of the Jordan-based Jerusalem Islamic Waqf, though control over access to the site passed to Israel. The Israeli government took several measures regarding the Temple Mount designed to reassure the world that it had no intention of making the issue of where the Temple Mount's sovereignty lay until this could be determined in final status negotiations, despite some frustration from within Jewish community over both the humiliating conditions imposed on prior worship at the remnant of the Temple, and a certain desire for revenge, according to Meron Benvenisti. Israel prohibited the flying of an Israeli flag over the site, and refrained from extending a number of Israeli laws, including those governing Holy Places, to the Haram al-Sharif.

Uzi Narkis (then chief of the IDF's Central Command) described the arrangements at the time as follows:

The IDF will clear the Temple Mount platform and will redeploy outside it. The Israeli administration will be responsible for general security, but will not interfere with the internal guarding and the internal inspection of the running of the Mount.

Currently eleven gates are open to the Muslim public. Non-Muslims are permitted to enter only through the Moors' Gate.

=== Chief Rabbinate of Israel ===
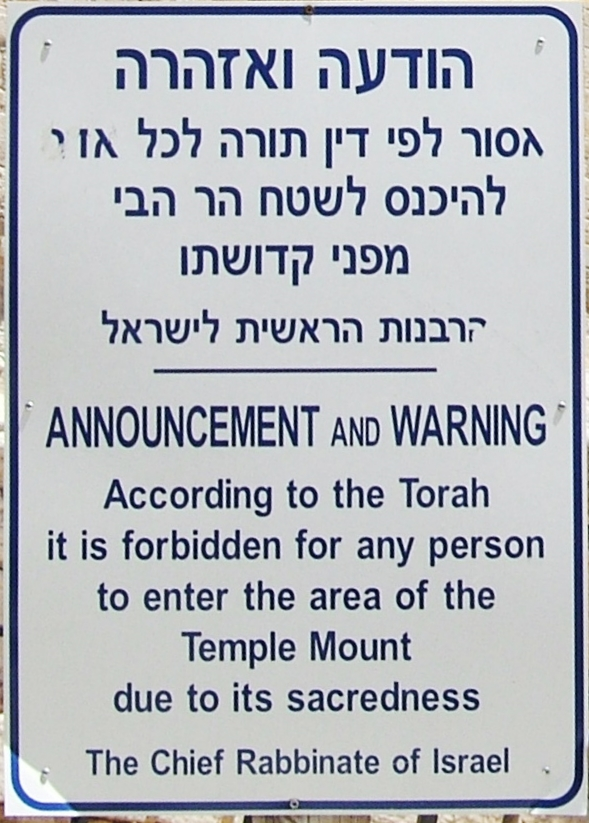
Sign on behalf of the Chief Rabbinate of Israel, warning of the halakhic prohibition to enter the Temple Mount, with some ambiguity whether gentiles are supposed to obey this rule too.

After Israel captured the site in 1967, the Chief Rabbinate of Israel announced that entering the Temple Mount was forbidden to Jews, in accordance with a halakhic prohibition against temei ha'met (impurity by contacting the dead, cemeteries etc.). The ancient ban on Jews, other than a high priest, entering the zone of the Holy of Holies was confirmed, with the consideration also that, since the exact location of the Second Temple was unknown, any Jew walking through the site would be at grave risk of inadvertently treading on the ground of the Holy of Holies in error.

According to Maimonides, all must still show the same respect (fear) for the Temple which it commanded before its destruction. He added that, "[n]o one may enter it except the places that one is permitted to enter." There is an ongoing ideological and halakhic debate whether it is permissible or forbidden to enter the Temple Mount. On one side stand those (mainly Haredi) who prohibit the entry to all persons in all areas of the Mount, in fear that a visitor might enter the Temple location. On the other side, there are those who do not see, based on the same halakha, any wrongdoing in Jews entering the Temple Mount while observing the halakhic purity laws, and getting only to certain areas of the Mount. Additionally there are others (mainly Religious Zionists) who even see visiting the site as a Mitzvah, meaning prayer there should be considered a religious duty.

=== Restrictions on entry ===
The Israeli government has imposed restrictions on all three religious groups – Jews, Christians and Muslims – on entry to Temple Mount (known to Muslims as Al-Aqsa).

==== Against Jews and Christians ====
Christians and Jews may only visit the site as tourists and only for four hours per day five days per week. Israel also restricts the number of religious Jews that can visit at a time. Until 2003, it was limited to five; in 2003 it was increased to 10; in 2010 it was increased to 20 and in 2011 it was again increased to 50 at a time.

==== Against Palestinian Muslims ====
As of 2024, the Israeli government had barred Palestinian Muslim men under the age of 55 and Palestinian Muslim women under the age of 50 residing in the West Bank from getting a permit to enter East Jerusalem for the sake of prayer during the month of Ramadan, which makes the vast majority of adult West Bank Palestinians ineligible.

Entry restrictions were frequently imposed during the 2015–2016 wave of violence in the Israeli-Palestinian conflict. Some examples:

- October 23, 2009: Entry restricted to Muslim men over 45 and Muslim women over 35.
- July 1, 2011: Entry restricted to Muslim men over 45.
- November 7, 2014: Entry restricted to Muslim men over 35.
- October 4, 2015: Entry restricted to Muslim men over 50 for two days.
- July 21, 2017: Entry restricted to Muslim men over 50.

The Israeli NGO Emek Shaveh has shown in a report in June 2015 that Israel's entrance restrictions changed the "status quo" of the Mount:

"The data shows that when there are political and security tensions in Jerusalem, the status quo on the Temple Mount / al-Haram al-Sharif is harmed. For example, in 2014 the Israeli police imposed age restrictions on worshipers 41 times. This amounts to nearly 15% of the year. This number indicates that the feeling among Palestinians that Israel is changing the status quo in the area, is backed up by police data, even if the restrictions are made due to extenuating circumstances, such as the murder attempt of Yehuda Glick. At the same time there is a direct link between rising restrictions on visitors in 2013 and 2014 and increasing attempts by right-wing groups to upset the status quo in the area."

== See also ==
- Status quo (Holy Land sites) – decrees "freezing" denominational rights to Holy Sites in the Holy Land as they were in 1757 and 1853
- HaLiba – "The project for Jewish freedom on the Temple Mount", an Israeli umbrella organisation dealing with the right of Jews to pray on the Temple Mount
