= Killing of Sa'ad Muhammad Youssef al-Atrash =

Sa'ad Muhammad Youssef al-Atrash (Arabic: سعد محمد يوسف الأطرش) was a 19-year-old Palestinian man who was shot and killed by Israeli soldiers on October 26, 2015, at a checkpoint in the Old City of Hebron close to the Cave of the Patriarchs (Ibrahimi Mosque) in the West Bank. According to Amnesty International, he was one of many victims of Israeli extrajudicial killings during the 2015–2016 Palestinian unrest. According to the Israeli army, he attacked Israeli soldiers and was shot during the attack.

== The killing ==
According to the interview given by his mother he left his phone and ID at home and fifteen minutes later he became a "martyr".

According to Amnesty's report, which is based on witness testimonies, the killing unfolded as follows. On October 26, al-Atrash attempted to retrieve an ID card at an Israeli soldier at a checkpoint's request. As he reached into his pocket to grab his card another soldier standing behind him shot him on his right side. He was then shot six or seven times. He bled profusely as he lay on the ground for about 40 minutes while the soldiers did not provide medical treatment. The female witness who watched the situation from her balcony also reported seeing soldiers bring a knife and place it in the dying al-Atrash's hand. According to the witness:

"Then they put him on a stretcher and pushed him towards an ambulance but didn't put him in. By this time he looked extremely yellow and I thought that he was dead at that point. He remained in front of the ambulance for another 20 minutes before he was put inside it and taken away."

According to the Israeli military spokesperson:

"Thwarted an attack in Hebron when a Palestinian attempted to stab a soldier. Responding to imminent danger, IDF (army) forces on site fired at the perpetrator,"

A video clip showing al-Atrash's laying wounded surfaced after the killing. In the video a local can be heard shouting to the soldiers "At least take him an ambulance." The video later shows tear gas being fired.

According to an Israeli military spokesperson, al-Atrash died on his way to Shaare Zedek Hospital in Jerusalem.

In October, Israel began withholding the bodies of killed suspected attackers as a tactic meant to crack-down on violence. Al-Atrash's funeral was therefore not held until January 2, 2016, when Israeli authorities returned his body.

== Knife on Facebook ==
On December 2, 2015, Israeli journalist Ben-Dror Yemini published an op-ed in ynetnews in which he accused Amnesty of having an "anti-Israel agenda". He stated that al-Atrash had posted a picture of himself holding a bleeding knife on Facebook several days before he was killed and he alleged that Amnesty had deliberately omitted that. Amnesty responded with:

"The Facebook picture does not change the circumstances of al-Atrash's death. According to our assessment, which is based on a testimony, he did not pose an immediate life-endangering threat when he was shot repeatedly. In any event. Even if he was shot because soldiers believed he posed a lethal threat, he should not have been left to bleed for 40 minutes."

== Responses ==
On February 17, 2016, nine American congressmen and Senator Patrick Leahy wrote a letter to the US State Department inquiring about "specific allegations of gross violations of human rights" by the security forces of Egypt and Israel. The letter's signatories wanted the State Department to investigate if the killing of, al-Atrash, among others, constituted a human rights violation. Israeli PM Benjamin Netanyahu in response to the letter said that "IDF soldiers and Israel Police officers protect with their bodies, in a moral manner, themselves and innocent civilians from bloodthirsty terrorists set on killing them.”

== See also ==
- List of violent incidents in the Israeli–Palestinian conflict, 2015
- 2015–2016 wave of violence in Israeli-Palestinian conflict
- Extrajudicial killing
