= Palestinian Authority Martyrs Fund =

Stipend disbursement organization

- Predecessor: Palestine Mujahidin and Martyrs Fund, Society for the Care of Palestinian Martyrs and Prisoners
- Type: Fund
- Purpose: Financial support to the families of Palestinians killed, injured, or imprisoned for violence against Israel; payments to Palestinians imprisoned in Israeli jails
- Parent organization: Palestinian Authority

The Palestinian Authority Martyrs Fund is a financial program operated by the Palestinian Authority (PA). It operates through two main channels: The Foundation for the Care of the Families of Martyrs that provides monthly financial support to the families of Palestinians who were killed, injured, or detained in connection with acts of violence against Israelis; and the Prisoners Fund that delivers payments to Palestinians currently held in Israeli prisons. As of 2018, the stipends amounted to $330 million, or 7% of the PA's annual budget.

Critics often call the fund "pay for slay" and blame the payments for "encouraging terrorism". In 2007, the World Bank argued that the fund did "not seem justified from a welfare or fiscal perspective."

By 2014, mounting criticism of the payments led to the PA transferring management of the Martyrs Fund to the Palestinian Detainees and Ex-Detainees Affairs Commission, of the Palestine Liberation Organization (PLO), which now disburses the government-funding to recipients and their families. On 10 February 2025, PA president Mahmoud Abbas signed a decree to end the Martyrs Fund to provide stipends based on financial need. As of October 2025, Israeli authorities alleged that evidence indicated the fund was still active. According to the US State Department, the Palestinian Authority continued the fund under a different name.

== History ==
=== Early development ===
Palestinian movement Fatah established the Palestine Mujahidin and Martyrs Fund in 1964 to recompense the families of dead and wounded Palestinian fedayeen militants. In 1971, this fund was replaced by the Society for the Care of Palestinian Martyrs and Prisoners. The Society classified "military martyrs" broadly, including not only fedayeen killed during military operations, but also those who died of natural causes while on active service. Their families received cash stipends. Non-members of the Palestine Liberation Organization (PLO) who died in encounters with Israeli security forces received one-time payments, creating incentives for families to posthumously apply to reclassify their deceased relatives as fighters.

Various funding agencies have managed these payments over the decades, including the "Fund for Families of Martyrs and the Injured." SAMED, the Palestine Martyrs Works Society, was founded in 1970, and took on some responsibility for martyr payments while also providing employment in Palestinian refugee camps in Lebanon throughout the 1970s.

=== Formalization and controversy ===
The payments were routinized during the Second Intifada (2000–2005). However, the question of which Palestinian factions' militants from all political factions would receive payments from the Palestinian Authority (PA) has been highly contested. PA President Mahmoud Abbas withdrew such payments for PLO-affiliated prisoners, but restored them in 2009. The PA government has claimed it does not make payments to families of prisoners belonging to Hamas or Islamic Jihad.

=== US Sanctions and public end of program ===
After Joe Biden's election as U.S. president in 2020, Palestinian officials reportedly expressed willingness to modify the payment system. The proposed change would base stipends on prisoners' financial need rather than sentence length, which would bring the PA into compliance with the 2018 Taylor Force Act. This Act had suspended U.S. aid to the PA as long as it continued making payments to prisoners, including those convicted of attacks against Israeli civilians, and families of those killed fighting Israelis.

On 10 February 2025, Abbas signed a degree reportedly ending the Martyrs Fund. The new system based stipends to families solely on financial need, a move described as a goodwill gesture toward the new Donald Trump administration. This decision faced internal criticism, notably from Qadura Fares, head of the PA's Ministry of Detainees and Ex-Detainees Affairs. Fares was subsequently fired by Abbas on 18 February. Hamas characterized Fares' dismissal as "submission to Zionist and American dictates."

In October 2025, Israeli foreign minister Gideon Sa'ar and Palestinian Media Watch watchdog alleged that the PA had not ended financing the Fund, but instead changed the mode of its delivery by channeling payments to recipients through the Palestinian postal system. The watchdog concluded from social media conversations that payments were still being received by comparing stated amounts to previously publicly known received amounts. Local telegram channels published that "the salaries of the prisoners, the wounded, and the Martyrs have arrived at the post office".

In February 2026, the US State Department stated that the Palestinian Authority had continued the fund under a different name, providing $200 million to militants and their families in 2025. Palestinian Media Watch also reported that the PA are expected to continue the fund with $315 million in 2026.

== Structure and operations ==
The PA distributes payments through two primary funds:

- The Prisoners Fund makes payments to individuals imprisoned by Israel ("prisoner payments")
- The Foundation for the Care of the Families of Martyrs ("Martyrs Fund"), under the PA's Ministry of Social Affairs, provides financial support to families of individuals wounded or killed during confrontations with Israel.

Both funds operate under the PLO umbrella but receive their funding from the PA, which employs over 500 bureaucrats.

=== Budget ===
These payments, total more than $300 million annually, representing approximately 7 percent of the PA's annual budget.

In 2017, the payment system allocated:

- $160 million was paid to 13,000 beneficiaries of "prisoner payments" (averaging $12,307 per person)
- $183 million was paid to 33,700 families in about in "martyr payments" (averaging $5,430 per family) annually

Of the total amount:

- $36 million went to prisoners serving sentences of more than 20 years
- $10 million to former members of the security forces
- $1 million to families of 200 suicide bombers
- $10 million to the families of the Palestinians with life terms, lengthy sentences, and in the security forces

In 2016, $173 million in "martyr payments" supported 35,100 families, including the families of suicide bombers, according to Palestinian figures. The stipend is higher than the average Palestinian wage.

In 2025, a decree mandated that payments would be transferred to a government body affiliated with the president's office, implementing a new disbursement mechanism, though specific details have not yet been announced.

=== Foundation for the Care of the Families of Martyrs ===
Between January 1995 and June 2002, the fund distributed NIS 16 million to families of prisoners annually, and between June 2002 to June 2004 NIS 88.5 million annually.

As of 2016, the fund had an annual budget of $173 million and supported approximately 35,100 families, according to Palestinian figures. Stipends are paid to families of both prisoners and Palestinians killed in contexts ranging from political demonstrations that turn violent where protesters are killed by non-lethal riot control methods (such as being hit by a tear gas canister) and to individuals imprisoned for "common crimes".

According to the fund's head Intisar al-Wazir, each family of a deceased individual received a base stipend of 1,400 NIS ($350), with additional amounts provided based on marital status and number of children:

- Married recipients received an additional $100
- Each child added $50 to the monthly payment
- Children received support until age 18 or until they began working
- University students received support until graduation

Families of individuals killed by Israeli security forces typically received stipends of $800 to $1,000 per month, while families of convicted Palestinians serving time in Israeli prisons received $3,000 or more per month.

In 2017, the National Association of the Martyrs' Families of Palestine advocated for cost of living increases in their stipends, which had remained unchanged since 2011.

In June 2021, the PA paid the family of a Palestinian who murdered two Israelis 30,000 Jordanian dinars ($42,000) to "complete the payment of the price" of the family's house that was demolished by the IDF.

=== Prisoners fund ===
The payment system for Palestinian prisoners is codified in Palestinian law. Under the Amended Palestinian Prisoners Law No. 19 (2004), prisoners who have served a year or more in Israeli prison are entitled upon release to health insurance and tuition-free school, university and professional education. If they become civil servants, the law stipulates that the Palestinian Authority will "pay his social security and pension fees... for the years he spent in prison." Incarcerated individuals are entitled to monthly stipends "linked to the cost-of-living index." Amendments in 2013 entitle individuals released from prison a preference in getting jobs with the Palestinian Authority, and stipulates that the PA "will make up the difference" if the civil service salary "is lower than the salary he received in prison." Females who have served 2 years in prison, and males who have served 5 are entitled to receive stipends for the rest of their lives. The fund also pays $106 a month in "canteen money" to imprisoned Palestinians, including those imprisoned for non-political crimes such as car theft and drug dealing. These payments totaled more than $10 million to support purchases for food and clothing in 2018. Hakim Awad, who perpetrated the 2011 Itamar attack, receives $14,000 per year, and can expect to receive more than $1.9 million over the length of his incarceration if he lived to be 80 years old.

In 2016, the fund for Palestinian prisoners had a budget of $125 million, according to the Palestinian Finance Ministry. PLO Commissioner for Prisoners’ Affairs Qadri Abu Bakr stated that the PLO paid as much as $181 million in salaries to imprisoned Palestinians in 2020. The PLO supported about 7,500 released prisoners and 4,500 currently detained prisoners. NGO Palestinian Media Watch had previously estimated the 2020 payments at $159 million.

== Hamas payments ==
Hamas has operated a separate fund for years predating its takeover of the Gaza Strip in 2007. In 2001, Sheikh Ahmed Yassin, the founder of Hamas, boasted that Hamas payments to the families of prisoners and of suicide bombers totaled between $2 and $3 million. According to a 2001 report by the Israeli government, the families of prisoners received an initial lump sum payment of between $500 and $5,000, with monthly stipends of about $100, with higher payments for the families of Hamas members.

== Role in Palestinian society ==
The so-called "martyr payments" are "exceedingly popular" among Palestinians and have been described as "part of the ethos of Palestinian society." Support for the payments among Palestinians is as high as 91%. According to Ziad Asali, founding president of the pro-Palestinian American Task Force on Palestine, Palestinian politicians and the media have elevated these payments to the point where they are "sacred in Palestinian politics," and no government dares terminate the practice. Professor Nathan Brown of George Washington University says that the stipends to prisoner's families are "universally supported among Palestinians."

The Palestinian Prisoners' Club defends the stipends; the club's leader, Qadura Fares, maintains that payments supporting the families of prisoners are just because the families, "are a part of our people" and that "the family did nothing against anyone." According to Fares, the attacks for which the prisoners were convicted are "not terror," but "part of the struggle" against Israel.

In June 2017, PA President Mahmoud Abbas called efforts to stop the martyr payments an "aggression against the Palestinian people," and defended the salaries paid to imprisoned Palestinians as a "social responsibility." In response to the Taylor Force Act, a law in the United States halting economic aid to PA until the martyr payments cease, Abbas pledged "If we are left with one penny, we will spend it on the families of the prisoners and martyrs."

A public opinion poll commissioned by The Washington Institute for Near East Policy in June 2017 showed that two-thirds of Palestinians polled disagreed with the PA's policy, saying that Palestinian prisoners and their families do not deserve extra payments on account of their "armed operations", but should instead be given regular social benefits like other Palestinians.

== Criticism ==
Critics, including Jewish communities, journalists, foreign politicians, and Israel often call the payments "pay for slay" and blame the payments for encouraging and incentivizing terrorism, such as car ramming and stabbings.

In 2007, the World Bank argued that the fund did "not seem justified from a welfare or fiscal perspective." By 2014, mounting criticism of the payments led to the PA transferring management of the Martyrs Fund to the Palestinian Detainees and Ex-Detainees Affairs Commission, of the PLO, which now disburses the government-funding to recipients and their families.

== Reactions ==
=== Israel ===
Prime Minister Netanyahu called the payments "an incentive for murder". The Israeli government, describing the payments as "glorifying terrorism", responded to the June 2016 murder of Hallel Yaffa Ariel by threatening to deduct the value of "martyr" payments from the tax and customs revenue it pays to the PA. Palestinians reject the idea that money is a key motive and say that "attackers are driven by despair over the chokehold of half a century of Israeli occupation or a desire to avenge others killed by Israelis".

The Washington Post's Fact Checker column examined Fund criticism by Netanyahu in "Does the Palestinian Authority pay $350 million a year to ‘terrorists and their families’?" and concluded that there were "Significant omissions and/or exaggerations. Some factual error may be involved but not necessarily."

Speaking before the United Nations Security Council on 24 June 2017, Israeli ambassador Danny Danon, together with Oran Almog, one of the victims of the Maxim restaurant suicide bombing, demanded that the PA cease incentivizing terrorism by paying stipends to terrorists.

Under the Deduction Law, also known as the "Pay-for-Slay Law", the Israeli government since 2018 has withheld a portion of the taxes and tariffs it collects on behalf of the PA in the amount that the PA pays in martyr payments. The amount withheld each month equals one-twelfth of the total stipends paid by the PA in the previous year. These funds are the largest source of income for the PA. In July 2021, Israel deducted NIS 597 million for 2020, compared to total PA funding of NIS 517.4 million in 2019.

In September 2022 the Israeli government issued seizure orders for 10 million shekels that the PA transferred into the private accounts of security prisoners who were involved in deadly attacks.

=== Australia ===
In July 2018, Australia stopped A$10 million (US$7.5 million) in funding sent to the PA via the World Bank, instead routing the money to the UN Humanitarian Fund for the Palestinian Territories. The reason given was that they did not want the PA to use the funds to assist Palestinians convicted of politically motivated violence.

=== Germany ===
During the month of September 2016, the government of Germany has expressed concerns about the payment of foreign aid to the PA in the light of the use of these funds to incentivize terrorism and has promised to investigate the matter.

=== Netherlands ===
In November 2019, the Netherlands cut the US$1.5 million per annum it paid directly to the Palestinian Authority over payments it makes to families of militants killed, hurt, or imprisoned by Israel.

=== Norway ===
In 2016, Børge Brende, Foreign Minister of Norway, demanded that the PA cease using Norwegian foreign aid for "martyr" stipends. He was satisfied with an assurance that Norwegian funds would not be used for the stipends, although the change was purely "cosmetic" since PA funds are fungible.

=== United States ===
Following the murder of Hallel Yaffa Ariel, a dual Israeli-U.S. national, in June 2016, the United States threatened to deduct the sums paid out to "martyrs" from the Martyrs Fund from the subsidies it grants to the PA. The murder of American Taylor Force by a Palestinian led to Congress passing and President Donald Trump signing the Taylor Force Act in 2018. The law cuts about a third of US foreign aid payments to the PA, until the PA ceases making payment of stipends to terrorists and their surviving families.

The Biden administration resumed payments to the PA that have been used towards "pay to slay." Many commentators have also advised that any future payments to the PLO be conditioned on the complete cessation of funds going towards payments to murderers of Israeli or American civilians. A lawsuit against Joe Biden and Antony Blinken was filed stating that the United States government funding such "pay to slay" terrorism is a violation of the Taylor Force Act passed in 2018 during the Trump administration. Some commentators allege that the Biden administration may circumvent the Taylor Force Act by merely claiming that the funds are being made in support of Palestinian "humanitarian aims." Critics argue that by claiming to give funds in support of "humanitarian assistance" the Biden administration is claiming a loophole that does not exist, and that the funds may still be redirected with ease towards "pay to slay" ends. Numerous commentators criticize how easily the PA is able to re-direct American funds once received from the United States, towards "pay to slay" programs. Also, critics allege that it is unlikely that the PA is going to use all of the money received from the American government for strictly "humanitarian" purposes, on the basis that the majority of funds within the PA budget already as of 2023 go towards "pay to slay" and not "other welfare programs", as reported by The Jerusalem Post: "The perverse incentive used by the PA is that the more gruesome and worse the attack, the more money the imprisoned 'martyr' and his family receive through the Palestinian Authority’s Martyrs Fund. The PA spends nearly $350 million per year on 'pay for slay', but just $220 million for its other welfare programs for the rest of its citizens."

In 2025, the U.S. Supreme Court agreed to hear a case, Fuld v. Palestine Liberation Organization and United States v. Palestine Liberation Organization, to decide whether American victims of Palestinian attacks can sue the PLO and PA for damages based on support for such attacks through the program. The U.S. House of Representatives and a group of 17 Jewish groups each filed amicus curae briefs in support of the families.

=== United Kingdom ===
In 2016, the UK Department for International Development froze $30 million in aid to the Palestinian Authority over concern the aid was being used to fund salaries for Palestinian prisoners in Israel convicted in Israeli civilian courts of murder and terrorism.

The Palestinians point out the need to prevent a descent into poverty by these families, who are frequent victims of collective punishment such as demolition of housing and revoking of work permits.

=== International organizations ===
Countering Palestinian Authority claims that this is a welfare fund, the World Bank has stated that, "the program is clearly not targeted to the poorest households. While some assistance should be directed to this population, the level of resources devoted to the Fund for Martyrs and the Injured does not seem justified from welfare or fiscal perspective."

== Sources ==
- Kuperwasser, Yossi. Incentivizing Terrorism: Palestinian Authority Allocations to Terrorists and Their Families, 2017. Published online and as a paperback
