= Shorouq Dwayyat =

Palestinian prisoner involved in 2015 stabbing attack

- Born: 1997 (age 28–29); East Jerusalem
- Occupation: Former university student
- Known for: Convicted for the 2015 stabbing attack in Jerusalem's Old City
- Status: Released in 2023 as part of a prisoner exchange
- Penalty: 16 years imprisonment

Shorouq Salah Dwayyat is a Palestinian woman from Sur Baher who was convicted for a stabbing attack and served a prison sentence in Israel between 2015 and 2023, when she was released in exchange of captives between Israel and Hamas. On October 7, 2015, Dwayyat, then an 18-year-old university student from East Jerusalem, carried out a stabbing attack in Jerusalem's Old City. She attacked 36 years old Daniel Rosenfeld, inflicting moderate injuries on him. The incident escalated when Dwayyat attempted to stab another man, Zvi Greenspan, but was subsequently shot and critically injured by Rosenfeld. Prior to the attack, Dwayyat had expressed on Facebook a desire to die as a "martyr" for the Palestinian cause.

The attack occurred against the backdrop of the 2015–2016 wave of violence in the Israeli–Palestinian conflict, also known as the Knife Intifada.

Dwayyat was tried and convicted by the Jerusalem District Court, receiving a 16-year prison sentence. Additionally, the court imposed a fine of NIS 80,000 (approximately $20,000) on her. This sentence was handed down after she was found guilty of stabbing Rosenfeld and attempting to stab Greenspan.

== 2015 stabbing attack ==
On October 7, 2015, Dwayyat, then an 18-year-old university student from Sur Baher, East Jerusalem, attacked and stabbed an Israeli man, Daniel Rosenfeld. The attack occurred just inside the entrance to the Old City. Rosenfeld sustained moderate injuries in the shoulder and head. Dwayyat attempted to stab another man, Zvi Greenspan, but was shot by Rosenfeld and critically injured.

Facebook post from the day of the attack expressing aspiration to become a shahida

A few hours before the incident, she posted on her Facebook page, expressing her aspiration to become a shahida (martyr) for the Palestinian cause, asking her mother not to mourn for her in the event of her death. Her post read, "Mother, where am I going? Mother, I am going to be a shaheeda (female martyr). Mother, I want to ask you not to cry for me when I become a shaheeda. Our greatest aspiration is to die as a martyr for the sake of Allah."

In an interview with Israel Channel 2, the mother of Dwayyat made the claim that her daughter's action of stabbing an Israeli was an act of self-defense, claiming that it occurred after the man tried to remove her head covering. According to her mother, Dwayyat had informed her that she intended to pray at the Al-Aqsa Mosque before attending her classes in Bethlehem.

== Legal proceedings and sentencing ==
The Jerusalem District Prosecutor's Office filed an indictment in the Jerusalem District Court against Dwayyat. The indictment describes the sequence of events leading to Dwayyat's decision to carry out the attack as follows: On October 7, 2015, Dwayyat decided to commit murder as part of her commitment to the national and religious struggle. She expressed her intentions in a Facebook post, stating her aspiration to die as a martyr. The following morning, she left her house with a 30 cm long kitchen knife and a screwdriver, targeting Daniel Rosenfeld and Tzvi Greenspan on Hagai Street in the Old City. Dwayyat stabbed Rosenfeld in the shoulder and head, intending to kill him. The indictment charges Dwayyat with attempted murder using a knife as part of a nationalist-motivated attack, within the broader context of ongoing terror activities.

Dwayyat was sentenced by the Jerusalem District Court to 16 years in prison for her role in the attack. In addition, she was ordered to pay a fine of NIS 80,000 (approximately $20,000). The sentence was pronounced after she was found guilty of stabbing one man and attempting to stab another.

== Release in 2023 ==
In November 2023, Dwayyat was released from prison as part of a prisoner exchange deal. This exchange was conducted for hostages held in Gaza.

== Victim ==
Daniel Rosenfeld, the victim of the stabbing attack, sustained moderate injuries. Rosenfeld, who was 36 years old at the time of the attack, was able to shoot Dwayyat preventing further harm.
