= Taylor Force Act =

2018 US law related to aid to the Palestinian Authority

- Long title: To condition assistance to the West Bank and Gaza on steps by the Palestinian Authority to end violence and terrorism against Israeli citizens.

Citations
- Public law: Pub. L. 115–141 (text) (PDF), Division S, Title X

Codification
- Acts amended: Foreign Assistance Act
- U.S.C. sections amended: 22 U.S.C. § 2346

Legislative history
- Introduced in the House as H.R. 1164 by Doug Lamborn on February 16, 2017; Committee consideration by United States House Committee on Foreign Affairs; Passed the House on December 5, 2017 (Voice vote); Passed the Senate on March 23, 2018 (Amendment to the Consolidated Appropriations Act, 2018 65–32); Signed into law by President Donald Trump on March 23, 2018

The Taylor Force Act is an Act of the U.S. Congress to stop American economic aid to the Palestinian Authority (PA) until the PA ceases paying stipends through the Palestinian Authority Martyr's Fund to individuals who commit acts of terrorism and to the families of deceased terrorists. The Act was signed into law by U.S. President Donald Trump on March 23, 2018, which will cut about a third of US foreign aid payments to the PA. On August 24, 2018, the United States cut more than $200 million in direct aid to the PA. Also in August 2018, the United States stopped giving aid to UNRWA, representing an aid cut of US$300 million.

In February 2019, the US confirmed it stopped all USAID to Palestinians in the West Bank and Gaza, in a step linked to new anti-terrorism legislation. The Anti-Terrorism Clarification Act of 2018 (ATCA, P.L. 115–253), passed by Congress and signed into law by Trump on October 3, 2018, came into force in February 2019, and allows Americans to sue in US courts those receiving US foreign aid over alleged complicity in "acts of war". The US has stopped providing more than $60m in annual funds for the Palestinian security services at the request of the PA because of a fear of such lawsuits. The stopping of funding for security services has raised some concerns.

== Background ==
The bill was named in honor of Taylor Force, a native of Lubbock, Texas who graduated from the New Mexico Military Institute (a secondary school) and then West Point in 2009 and served tours of duty in both Afghanistan and Iraq. After completing his service, Taylor entered the Owen Graduate School of Management at Vanderbilt University to study for an MBA. He was murdered in Israel in 2016 by a Palestinian terrorist. At the time of his murder, he was visiting Israel as part of a Vanderbilt University study group examining global entrepreneurship.

He was killed on March 8, 2016, in a terrorist attack by a Palestinian from the West Bank city of Qalqilya, a stabbing attack in Tel Aviv that injured eleven people. Because the killer died while committing an act of terrorism, the killer's relatives are paid a monthly pension equal to several times the average monthly Palestinian wage. The pension, paid by the Palestinian Authority Martyr's Fund, is part of a Palestinian Authority policy to pay a monthly cash stipends to the families of Palestinians killed, injured or imprisoned for involvement in attacking, assisting in attacking, or planning to attack Israel, or for other types of politically inspired violence, including riots, violent demonstrations, and throwing rocks.

== Bill ==
The bill was co-sponsored in the United States Senate in 2016 by U.S. Senators Lindsey Graham (R-South Carolina), Dan Coats (R-Indiana), and Roy Blunt (R-Missouri). On August 3, 2017, the United States Senate Committee on Foreign Relations passed the advancement of the bill by a vote of 16–5.

The Bill, passed on March 23, 2018, as part of the Consolidated Appropriations Act, 2018, ends American aid to the Palestinian Authority unless the Authority ceases to pay stipends to the terrorists and their families, including the families of suicide bombers. Democrats, initially reluctant to support the Bill on the grounds that the payments were necessary to keep the West Bank from political upheaval, became more inclined to support the bill in 2017.

== Discussion ==
The editorial board of The Wall Street Journal endorsed the bill on the grounds that it would force the government of Mahmoud Abbas to end a policy of "rewarding terrorism". Legal scholar Thane Rosenbaum described the stipends the Act moves to end as "lavish incentives to commit violence".

The Palestinian Authority argues that if it ceases to make such payments families will suffer from poverty; others refute this assertion by pointing out that American foreign aid could be distributed on the basis of need, instead of as a reward for murder and attempted murder. The PA also argues that if it stops rewarding terrorists and their families, Hamas will step in to make such payments and gain power in the West Bank.
