= Murder of Eitam and Na'ama Henkin =

2015 Palestinian attack against Israeli civilians in West Bank

2015 Beit Furik attack
- Part of the Israeli–Palestinian conflict (2015)
- The attack site
- Native name: רצח איתם ונעמה הנקין
- Location: 32°12′00″N 35°19′53″E; West Bank
- Date: October 1, 2015; 11 years ago
- Deaths: 2 civilians
- Perpetrator: Hamas
- No. of participants: 7

A married Israeli couple from Neria, Eitam Simon Henkin, a doctoral student at Tel Aviv University who also held American citizenship, and Na'ama Henkin, a graphic designer, were shot and killed on October 1, 2015, in the West Bank. The Henkins were driving past the town of Beit Furik, when the attack occurred. The Henkins' four children were in the van at the time of their parents' killing.

According to a statement released by Israel's Ministry of Foreign Affairs, a group affiliated with the Fatah Al-Aqsa Martyrs' Brigades claimed responsibility for the attack. However, the Israeli prosecution indicated that the attack was carried out by a Hamas cell.

== Assailants ==
- Yahia Muhammad Naif Abdullah Hajj Hamad, shooter.
- Samir Zahir Ibrahim Kusah, the driver, has been linked to previous attacks. Over a month before murdering the Henkins, Kusah together with Hajj Hamad, fired 20 rounds at an Israeli car near Enav, injuring driver Ronen Edri.
- Karem Lufti Fatahi Razek, gunman, who himself was wounded during the attack by gunfire by one of his fellow operative cell members.
- Zir Ziad Jamal Amar, who cleared the way for the car carrying the gunmen.
- Ragheb Ahmad Muhammad Aliwi (or Aliwa), who allegedly recruited, led and instructed the other four, is a paroled militant from Nablus.

Two other members of Aliwa's terror cell were also eventually convicted of aiding and abetting:

- Bassad Saikh a/k/a Bassam Ameen al-Sayeh
- Amgad Aliwa

=== Indictments ===
The assailants were indicted for murder, and for planning to kidnap the occupants of the car, a plan that was thwarted when Eitam Henkin tried to fight the attackers off.

== Context ==
The killing is cited as the first incident in the 2015–2016 wave of violence in Israeli-Palestinian conflict.

== Aftermath ==
Following the killings, Israel Defense Forces sent hundreds of soldiers in pursuit of the perpetrators of the attack. They were joined by members of the Shin Bet. Subsequently, Israeli security forces reportedly detained five members of a Hamas militant cell linked to the attack.

Hamas praised the attack. The Henkins were buried in Jerusalem. The funeral was attended by thousands of Israelis, including President Reuven Rivlin and Chief Rabbi David Lau.

Following the attack, settlers threw stones at Palestinian cars, ambulances and at Palestinian homes in the southern part of the village of Burin, close to the Yitzhar settlement. A 28-year-old woman was lightly wounded at Itzhar Junction and a Palestinian driver was lightly hurt in the entrance to Nablus.

Eventually the homes of six of the seven terrorists were demolished. On Nov. 14, 2015 the homes of Hamad, Kusah, and Razek were demolished. After another round of legal challenges ringleader Ragheb Aliwa's home was demolished on Dec. 3, 2015. Although the court had originally prevented the demolition of Amar's home since it was part of a multi-story residential building, following convictions of an additional murder committed earlier, his home and those of cell members Saikh and Amgad Aliwa were scheduled to be demolished and on Feb. 5, 2016, the owners of those last three homes were all warned of the imminent demolitions. Eventually Amgad Aliwa's homes was demolished and in May, 2016, so was Amar's. However, following further legal challenges the Supreme Court reversed its earlier ruling on al-Sayeh's home and just before the first anniversary of the murder on Sep 27, 2016 it finally denied the demolition order.

== Response ==
=== President of Israel ===
President Rivlin's statement condemning the murder read "Tonight, bloodthirsty murderers claimed the lives of a mother and a father, leaving their young children orphaned. The heart breaks at the magnitude of such cruelty and hatred. We will continue in our brave and unwavering fight against this cruel and heinous terrorism - of this our enemies can be sure. This is our duty, and the only way we can ensure the right of the orphans who lost their parents tonight, along with the right of all our children and grandchildren, to live with security and in peace, everywhere in the Land of Israel. We pray for the speedy recovery of the injured children - our hearts and thoughts are with them."

=== Prime Minister of Israel ===
Prime Minister Benjamin Netanyahu's statement read "This is a difficult day for the State of Israel. We are witness to an especially heinous and shocking murder in which parents were murdered, leaving four young orphans. My heart is with the children, all of our hearts are with the children and the family. The killers knew that they were murdering a mother and father, the children were there. It has been proven again that the wild Palestinian incitement leads to acts of terrorism and murder such as we have seen this evening. I am about to speak with the Defense Minister, the IDF Chief-of-Staff and the Director of the ISA about the steps we will take not only to apprehend the murderers but also to increase security for all Israeli citizens."

The New York Times quoted the Israeli Prime Minister stating "Palestinian terrorists murdered yesterday a young mother and father, leaving four little orphans. But I have to say, I have yet to hear any condemnation from President Abbas and the Palestinian Authority. Worse, I heard senior officials from his Fatah movement praise this action. They say this is the way to go. No, it is not the way to go. The way to go for any conceivable arrangement is to fight terrorism and to make sure that terrorism reaps no rewards."

=== Israel's Minister for Agriculture ===
Agriculture Minister Uri Ariel stated "This is a day of celebration of the holiday but also a difficult day for all of the people of Israel. This is a disgrace to the State of Israel. Terror continues in Jerusalem, on the Temple Mount, and throughout the country."

=== Human Rights Watch ===
Human Rights Watch condemned the murder, stating "The killing of a husband and wife in their car while their four children watched is a despicable act that flies in the face of law and decency. No political motive can justify targeting civilians."

=== Court actions ===
The relatives of Eitam and Naama Henkin brought a civil suit to a federal court in the United States against Iran and Syria for financing and arming Hamas. In 2021, the court ruled in favor of the Henkin relatives and found the countries liable for damages. According to the family's lawyer, the ruling marks the first time Iranian banks would be held liable for foreign terror activities that resulted in the killing of an American citizen. The legal action sought $360 million in civil damages for the wrongful death of the Henkin couple.

== See also ==
- Silent intifada
- Israeli–Palestinian conflict (2015)
- Eitam Henkin on Hebrew Wikipedia
