= 2016 Tel Aviv stabbings =

2016 terrorist attack in Israel

- Part of the Israeli–Palestinian conflict (2015–2016)
- Native name: פיגוע הדקירה בנמל יפו
- Location: 32°4′37″N 34°45′57″E; Jaffa Port and Tel Aviv Promenade, Israel
- Date: 8 March 2016
- Attack type: Stabbing
- Weapon: Knife
- Deaths: 1 civilian (+1 attacker)
- Injuries: 11 civilians
- Victims: Tourists and civilians
- Assailant: Bashar Massalha

On 8 March 2016, a 21-year-old (Note: Or 22 years old depending on sources) Palestinian man from Qalqilya killed an American tourist and wounded ten civilians in a stabbing spree in Jaffa Port, Tel Aviv, Israel. The attacker was shot dead by the police after a chase along the beach promenade.

== Attack ==
The attack happened while US Vice President Joe Biden was meeting with former Israeli President Shimon Peres in Tel Aviv. According to police, the assailant first attacked persons in the harbor and later went to a restaurant where four more persons were wounded. According to ambulance personnel, five of the victims suffered serious wounds. The attack lasted approximately 20 minutes and ended when the assailant was shot and killed by responding police.

=== Victims ===
Taylor Force, age 28, graduated from the New Mexico Military Institute and from West Point in 2009 and later became an officer in the United States Army until leaving in 2014. While in the army, Force served in both Iraq and Afghanistan, participating in Operation Iraqi Freedom, Operation New Dawn, and Operation Enduring Freedom. Force was an MBA student traveling with other graduate students from Vanderbilt University Owen Graduate School of Management studying global entrepreneurship.

In addition to Force, eleven others were injured, including a pregnant woman, an Arab Israeli, and a Palestinian who was illegally residing in Israel.

=== Assailant ===
The attacker was identified as 21-year-old Bashar Masalha, who was from the city of Qalqilya located in the Palestinian territories. He was residing in Israel illegally. The family of the murderer receives a monthly pension from the Palestinian Authority Martyr's Fund equal to several times the average monthly wage in the Palestinian Territories.

== Aftermath ==
The Israel Defence Forces (IDF) announced on the night of the attacks that it was imposing closures on the West Bank villages of Zawiya and Al-Auja, the hometowns of two of the attackers.

Following the attack and the two other attacks, Israeli Prime Minister Benjamin Netanyahu held security consultations with Israeli Defense Minister Moshe Ya'alon, Internal Security Minister Gilad Erdan, police chief Roni Alsheikh and IDF and Shin Bet officials. The Prime Minister's Office said it was immediately decided to close gaps in the separation barrier in the Jerusalem area, and to complete construction of the barrier in the Tarqumiyah area in the South Hebron Hills. It was also decided to close Palestinian media outlets accused of incitement. Professionals in the defense establishment will decide which Palestinian media will be closed. Further, it was decided to deny work permits for family members of assailants.

The Israeli police began a law enforcement operation to crack down on Palestinian illegal residents, arresting more than 250 illegal Arabs across the country, but focused on construction sites and large shopping areas, which normally are magnets for cheap, cash-in-the-hand labor. The arresting officers discovered a small compound, complete with sleeping tents, showers, a lavatory and a kitchen, which illegal Arab workers had erected in HaBesor Stream in southern Israel, not far from the Gaza Strip. Police reported that 15 Israeli employers and 12 drivers were arrested by 10 March. According to a Knesset Internal Affairs and Environment Committee from 14 March, chaired by MK David Amsalem (Likud), out of the 73 Palestinian attacks that occurred within the Green Line, 27 were carried out by illegal Arab residents. Police noted that each year sees tens of thousands of cases of illegal Arab residents, who are brought before a judge when their stay involves security risks, which means that there are tens of thousands of illegal Arabs moving freely everywhere inside Israel, some of whom may be "terrorist ticking bombs".

== Taylor Force Act ==
The Taylor Force Act is a legislative bill co-sponsored in the United States Senate in 2016 by U.S. Senators Lindsey Graham (R-South Carolina), Dan Coats (R-Indiana), and Roy Blunt (R-Missouri). The legislation proposes to stop American economic aid to the Palestinian Authority until the PA changes its laws to cease paying stipends funneled through the so-called Palestinian Authority Martyr's Fund to individuals who commit acts of terrorism and to the families of deceased terrorists. On March 23, 2018, the Act was signed into law by U.S. President Donald Trump.

== Reactions ==
The attack was condemned by Israel and the United States. It was praised by the Palestinian organizations Fatah, Hamas, and the Islamic Jihad Movement in Palestine.

== See also ==
- Israeli–Palestinian conflict (2015–present)
- List of violent incidents in the Israeli–Palestinian conflict, 2016
- List of terrorist incidents, January–June 2016
