= Murabitat =

Islamist political movement

Murabitat (Arabic: المرابطات, defenders of the faith, steadfast, or garrison soldiers) is an Islamist political movement of Muslim women, funded by the northern branch of the Islamic Movement in Israel. The group organises classes at al-Masjid al-Aqsa on Arabic literacy and qira'at and tajweed in Qur'anic recitation.

Members of the movement have also monitored Jewish visitation to the Al-Aqsa compound and attempts by activists to perform Jewish prayers, which, per the status quo, is disallowed by the Israeli and Jordanian authorities. Members have disrupted several such attempts by verbally abusing, and on occasion physically assaulting, Jewish activist groups. Israel has in turn attempted to bar access to Al-Aqsa by members of the group.

== History ==
The parallel groups, Murabiton for men and Murabitat for women, were created by the northern branch of the Islamist group, Islamic Movement in Israel in 2012. According to Haaretz, their purpose is "to harass Jews visiting Temple Mount." The groups run a daily shuttle service between the concentration of Arab towns including Umm al-Fahm and Tayibe), that is called the Triangle, as well as from the Negev and the Galilee to the Temple Mount.

According to Israeli security officials, before the male and female groups were banned and the offices of the NGO funding them closed, activists were paid 3,000–4,000 shekels ($771–$1,028) per month, with some of the funds coming from the Gulf States.

== Incidents ==
In August, 2015, the women harassed a group of visiting Members of the United States Congress, including Rep. Evan Jenkins, Rep. Trent Franks, Rep. Keith Rothfus and Mr. Jenkins' wife, Elizabeth Jenkins. Congressman Jenkins described himself as being, "struck by the level of intolerance and the confrontational attitudes and approach and actions" taken by the group." He described the behavior of the Muslims on the Temple Mount that day as "shocking".

Moshe Ya'alon, the Minister of Defense, has asserted that the groups' behavior leads, "to violence that could harm human life."

== Declared illegal ==
In August 2015, the activists were banned from Temple Mount by Israeli Minister of Public Security, Gilad Erdan, during morning visiting hours. Earlier, the Arab League condemned the plan to ban the group. On September 8, 2015, Defense Minister Moshe Ya'alon signed an order which declared the Murabitat group as an illegal organization.

Sheikh Azzam al-Khatib, head of the Jerusalem Islamic Waqf that administers the Temple Mount, called the decision, "totally unacceptable", asserting that the government of Israel had "no right" to intervene.

== See also ==
- Al-Aqsa Massacre
