= Baqa =

Baqa may refer to:

- Baka, Jerusalem, neighborhood in Jerusalem
- Baqa al-Gharbiyye, Arab city in Israel
- Baqa ash-Sharqiyya, Palestinian town in West Bank
- Baqat al-Hatab, Palestinian village in West Bank
- Baqa'a refugee camp, an UNRWA Palestine refugee camp near Amman, Jordan

== See also ==
- Baqaa
- Bakkah
