= Qalqilya =

Main city in the Qalqilya Governorate, West Bank

Coordinates: 32°11′25″N 34°58′07″E

Qalqilya قلقيلية
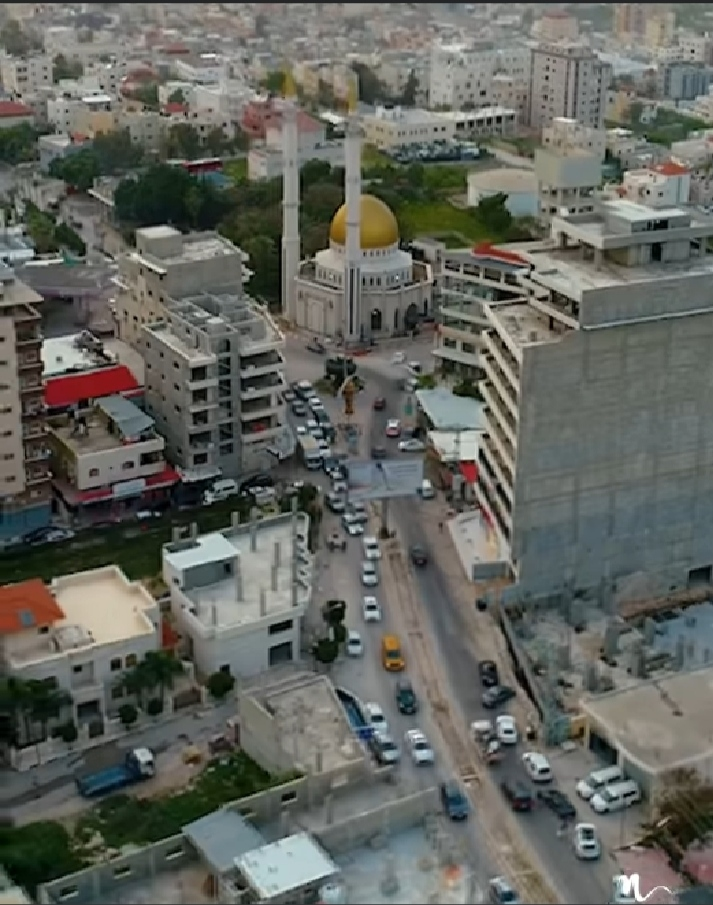
- Qalqilya in 2022

- Municipal Seal of Qalqilya
- Interactive map of Qalqilya
- Location of Qalqilya within Palestine Location of Qalqilya within the West Bank
- Palestine grid: 146/177
- State: Palestine
- Governorate: Qalqilya

Government
  - Type: City
  - Head of Municipality: Othman Dawoud

Area
  - Jurisdiction: 25.6 km^{2} (9.9 sq mi)
- Elevation: 57 m (187 ft)

Population (2024)
  - Jurisdiction: 65,354
- Website: https://qalqiliamun.ps/

Qalqilya or Qalqiliya (Arabic: قلقيلية, romanized: Qalqīlyaḧ) is a city in the West Bank, Palestine, which serves as the administrative center of the Qalqilya Governorate. The city had a population of 51,683 in 2017. Qalqilya is surrounded by the Israeli West Bank wall, with a narrow gap in the east controlled by the Israeli military and a tunnel to the Palestinian town of Hableh. Qalqilya is under the administration of the Palestinian National Authority (as part of Area A), while remaining under Israeli military occupation.

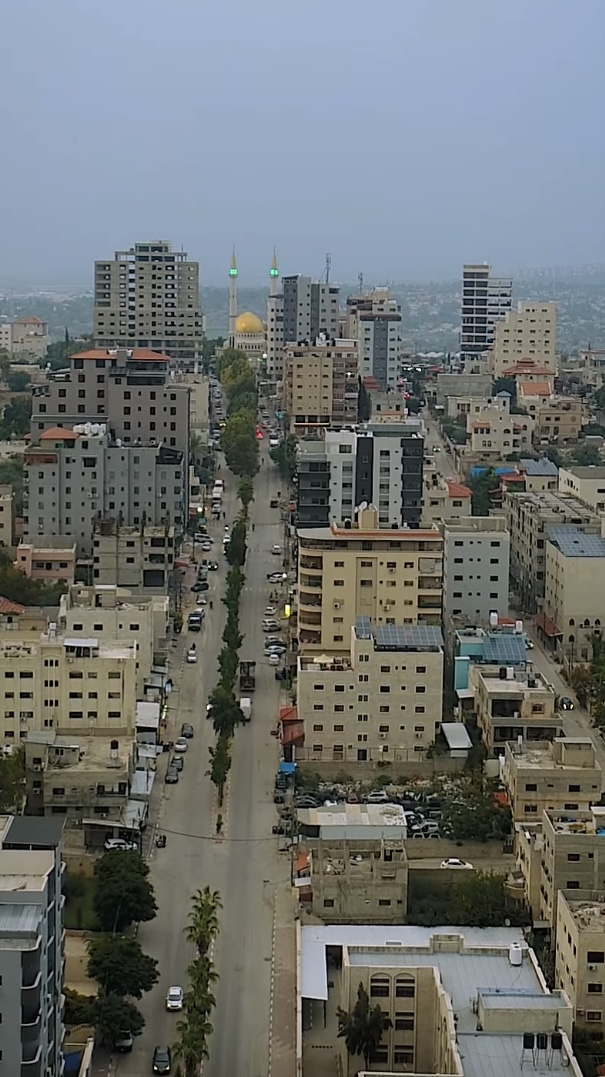
Qalqilya

According to Edward Henry Palmer, the name came from "a type of pomegranate", or "gurgling of water". Qalqilya was known as Calecailes in the Roman period, and Calcelie in the Frankish sources from the early Medieval times. The word "Qalqilya" might be derived from a Canaanite term which means "rounded stones or hills".

== History ==
The vicinity of Qalqilya has been populated since prehistoric times, as attested to by the discovery of prehistoric flint tools.

=== Ottoman period ===
Qalqilya appeared in Ottoman tax registers (transliterated as Qalqili) in 1596, as a village in the nahiya (subdistrict) of Bani Sa'b in the Liwa of Nablus. It paid a total of 3,910 akçe in taxes on wheat, barley, summer crops, olives, and goats or beehives.

Modern Qalqilya began as a daughter village of Baqa al-Hatab in the West Bank.

Edward Robinson described Kulakilieh in 1838 as a village in Beni Sa'ab district, west of Nablus. An Ottoman census listed the village in the nahiya (sub-district) of Bani Sa'b, in 1288 AH (1871/1872 CE).

Qalqilya was described in 1882 as "a large somewhat straggling village, with cisterns to the north and a pool on the south-west. The houses are badly built." Residents from nearby Baqat al-Hatab move to the city in 1883, and a municipal council to administer Qalqilya was established in 1909.

=== British Mandate period ===
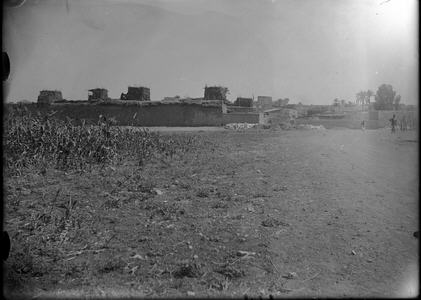
Qalqilya 1927

An official land survey recorded 27,915 dunams of land owned in 1945. Of this, 3,701 dunams were for citrus and bananas, 3,232 were plantations and irrigable land, 16,197 used for cereals, while 273 dunams were built-up (urban) land.

According to Sami Hadawi, the town had been "one of the most prosperous in Palestine, owning extensive orange groves and serving as one of the main vegetable markets of the country."

=== 1948 War ===
During the war, many inhabitants from Kafr Saba, Abu Kishk, Miska, Biyar 'Adas and Shaykh Muwannis resettled in Qalqilya. Residents of Qalqilya who left during the fighting returned with the arrival of the Jordanian Arab Legion and the Iraqi expeditionary force, apart from 2,000 upper-class residents who settled in Nablus for economic reasons. Hadawi argues that the armistice lines established in 1949 "severed all [Qalqilya's] orange groves in favour of Israel," leaving the town "landless except for its rocky areas towards the east."

=== Jordanian occupation ===
After the 1948 Arab–Israeli War, and the 1949 Armistice Agreements, the area was occupied by Jordan in 1950. On the night of 10 October 1956, the Israeli army launched a raid against Qalqilya police station in response to a Jordanian attack on Israeli bus, among other incidents. The attack was ordered by Moshe Dayan and involved several thousand soldiers. During the fighting, a paratroop company was surrounded by Jordanian troops and escaped under close air-cover from four Israeli Air Force aircraft. Eighteen Israelis and 70 to 90 Jordanians were killed in the operation.

=== Post 1967 ===
In the wake of the Six-Day War in 1967, Qalqilya came under Israeli rule. Dozens of inhabitants were expelled to Jordan as part of the Palestinian expulsions of 1967 known as the Naksa. 850 buildings were razed. After the IDF's psychological warfare unit made a visit to the city and many of the residents had fled, the UN representative Nils-Göran Gussing noted that 850 of the town's 2,000 houses were demolished. (Note: Segev 2007, "The Kalkilya residents had left their homes because the IDF called upon them to do so. "The people from psychological warfare turned up in the middle of the night with loudspeakers," recounted Colonel Ze'ev Shaham in an official inquiry. "I sent them to the Kalkilya area---- That made [the residents] really afraid. They were told all sorts of tall tales. They got up en masse and started leaving town. The men from psychological warfare told them about an Iraqi attack that would hit them there. That helped a lot.") In his memoirs, Moshe Dayan wrote that these actions ultimately constituted "collective punishment" which was contrary to government policy. The villagers were eventually allowed to return and the reconstruction of damaged houses was financed by the military authorities.

As part of the 1993 Oslo Accords between Israel and the Palestine Liberation Organization (PLO), control of Qalqilya was transferred to the Palestinian National Authority (PNA) on 17 December 1995.

In 2003, the Israeli West Bank barrier was built, encircling the town and separating it from agricultural lands on the other side of the wall.

In November 2015, Israel arrested what it alleged to be a network of 24 Hamas militants active in the city.

On 20 October 2017, the municipality of Qalqilya named a street after Saddam Hussein and erected a memorial with his likeness. The monument was unveiled at a ceremony attended by the Qalqilya District Governor Rafi Rawajba and two other Palestinian officials. It bears the slogan "Saddam Hussein – The Master of the Martyrs in Our Age".

On 19 June 2022, a 53-year-old Palestinian was shot and killed by Israeli forces as he sought to cross the Israeli West Bank barrier, which encircles Qalqilya. According to the IDF, he damaged the security fence in an attempt to cross into Israeli territory. It's unclear whether he was armed.

On 22 June 2024, a 60-year-old Israeli citizen was shot dead in Qalqilya by local residents. The victim, from Petah Tikva, regularly bought vegetables in the city. Following the shooting, his car was set on fire, and his personal documents were taken. This incident was the third in Qalqilya within 48 hours, following another attack on Thursday, where a 70-year-old Israeli was killed, and the elimination of two Islamic Jihad operatives who planned an attack.

== Geography ==
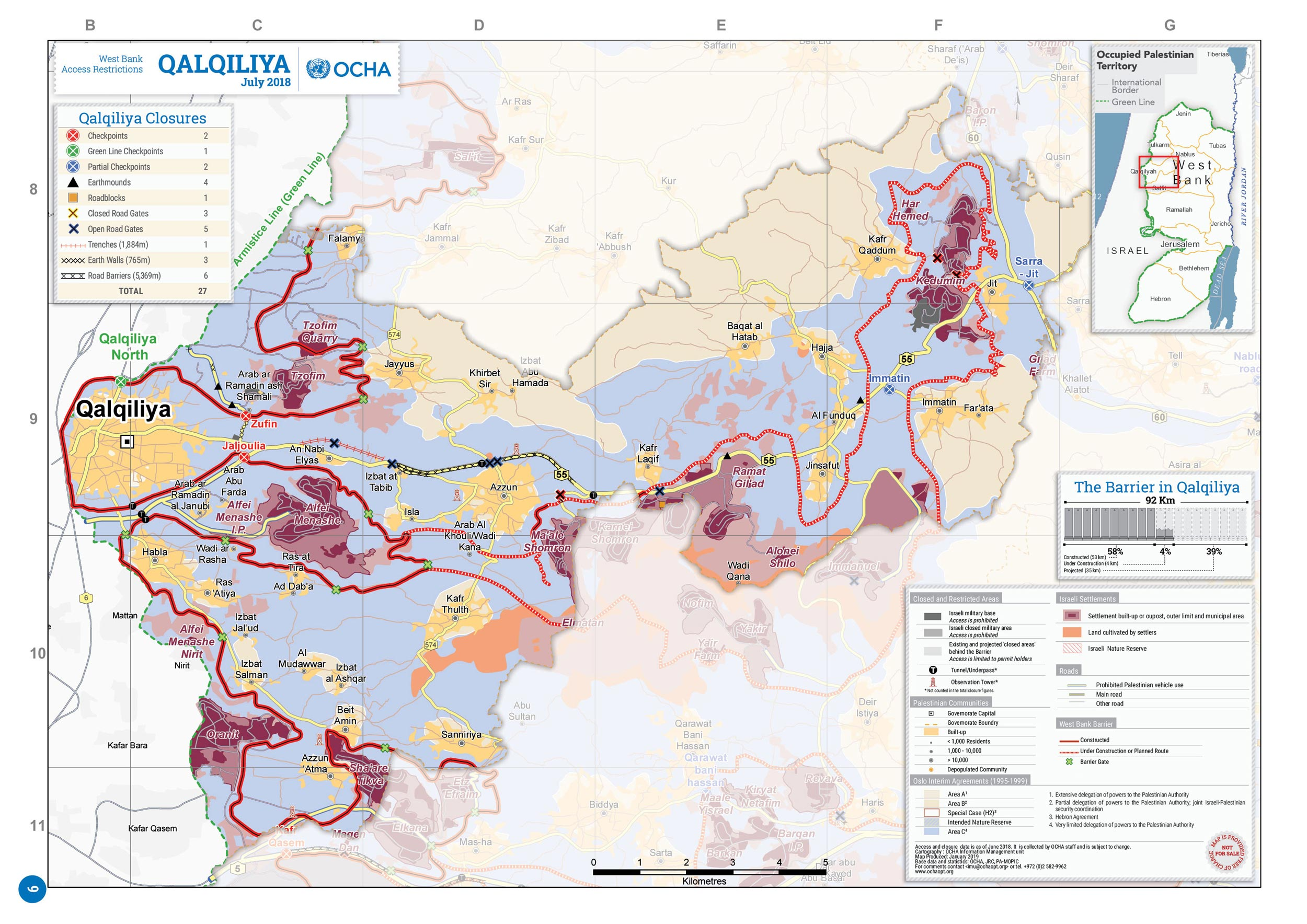
2018 United Nations map showing the West Bank barrier

Qalqilya is located in the northwestern West Bank, straddling the border with Israel. It is 16 kilometers southwest of the Palestinian city of Tulkarm, and the nearest localities are the Arab-Israeli city of Tira and the Palestinian hamlet of 'Arab al-Ramadin al-Shamali to the northeast, the Palestinian village of Nabi Ilyas to the east, the Palestinian hamlets 'Arab Abu Farda and 'Arab ar-Ramadin al-Janubi and the Israeli settlement of Alfei Menashe to the southwest, and the Palestinian village Habla and Arab-Israeli town of Jaljuliya to the south. It contains the point in the West Bank closest to the Mediterranean Sea, with about 14 km to the coast at Shefayim.

The average annual rainfall 587.4 millimeters and the average annual temperature is 19 degrees Celsius.

== Demographics ==
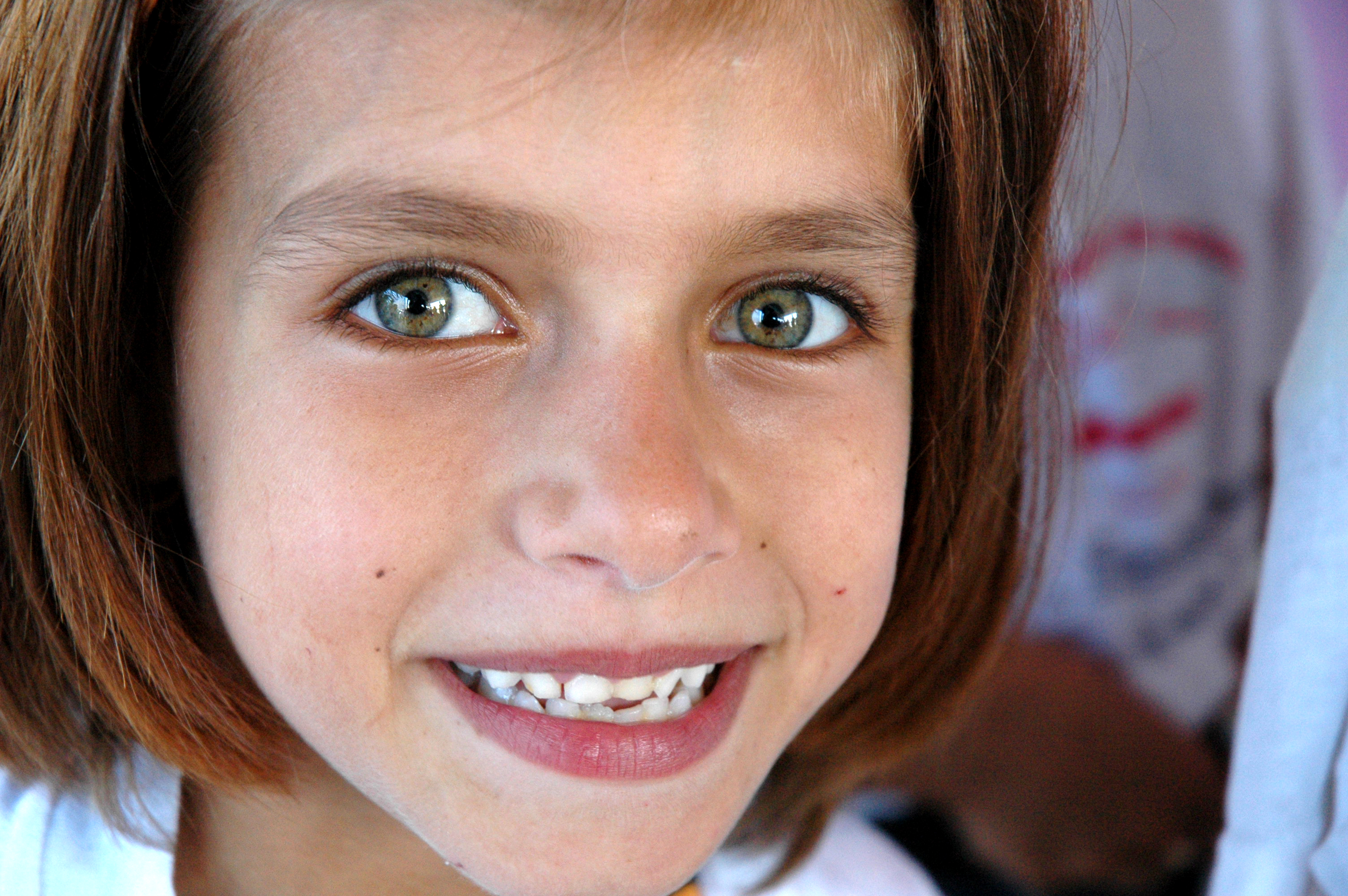
A Palestinian girl in Qalqilya in the West Bank

It had a population of 13 Muslim households, according to an Ottoman census in 1596.

Victor Guérin found a population of 200 in 1870.

The British Mandate authorities conducted a census in 1922, which found that Qalqilya had a population of 2,803 (2,794 Muslims and 9 Christians),. The population was 3,867 (3,855 Muslims and 12 Christians), in a total of 796 houses, according to the 1931 census. The population was listed at 4,503 (including 4 Jews) in the 1938 census. The population of Qalqilya was 5,850 (5,840 Muslims and 10 Christians, according to the 1945 census.)

The population of Qalqilya was 11,401, according to a Jordanian census in 1961. A census in September 1967 found 8,922 persons, of whom 1,837 were originally from Israeli territory.

The Palestinian Central Bureau of Statistics (PCBS) census recorded Qalqilya's population to be 22,168 in 1997. The majority of the inhabitants (69.8%) were Palestinian refugees or their descendants. In the 2007 census, Qalqilya's population was 41,739 (50.9% male and (49.1% female)). The number of registered households was 7,866. In the 2017 census, Qalqiliya's population was 51,683.

== Government ==
Hamas won the 2006 municipal elections in Qalqiliya and one of its members, Wajih Qawas, became mayor, although he was incarcerated by Israel for much of his term. On 12 September 2009, the PNA dismissed Qawas for allowing Qalqiliya's debt to grow unchecked, failing to attract international funding for city projects and ignoring orders by the Palestinian government. Qawas, however, viewed his dismissal as a result of the ongoing feud between Hamas, which dominates the PNA in the Gaza Strip and Fatah, which dominates the PNA in the West Bank. Human rights groups criticized Qawas's dismissal, condemning the intervention by the central Palestinian authorities in the affairs of an elected official. During the 2012 municipal elections, Fatah member Othman Dawood was elected mayor.

== Economy ==
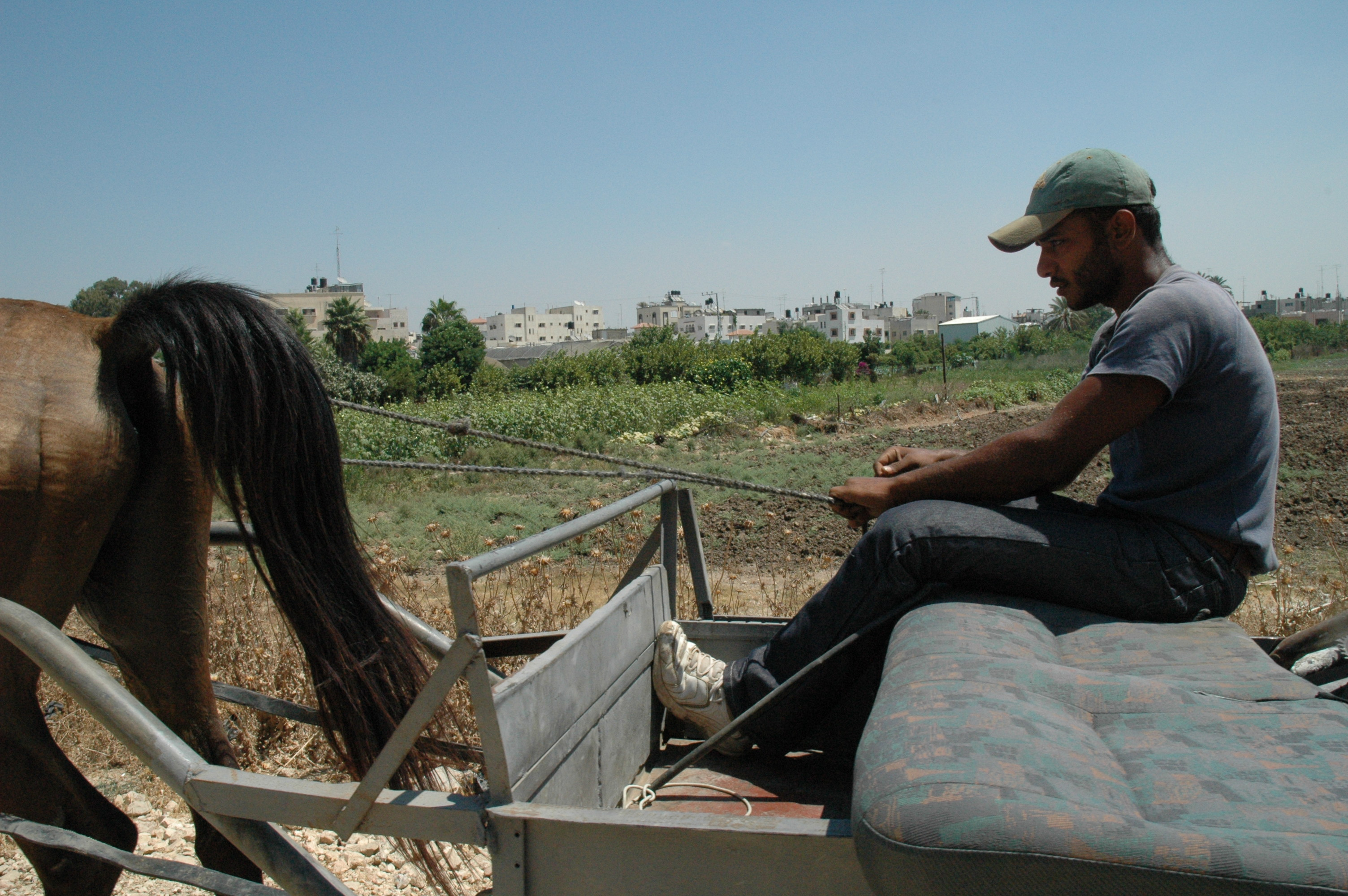
A Palestinian farmer near Qalqilya

Between 1967 and 1995 almost 80 percent of Qalqilya's labor force worked for Israeli companies or industries in the construction and agriculture sectors. The remaining 20% engaged in trade and commerce, marketing across the Green Line. According to a field survey taken by the Applied Research Institute-Jerusalem (ARIJ), 45% of Qalqilya's working population was employed by government, 25% worked in agriculture, 15% worked in trade and commerce, 10% worked in industry and 5% worked in Israeli labor. In 2012, the unemployment rate was 22%, with those most affected formerly employed in agriculture, trade and services.

Qalqilya is particularly known for its citrus crop and of its total of 10,252 dunams of land, (of which 5,930 are arable) 1802 dunams (about 17.6% of the city's land and over 30% of its arable land) are planted with citrus trees. Other major crops are olives and vegetables. Local industries include the manufacture of foodstuffs, olive oil, dairy products, soap, glass, stone, marble and building materials, in addition to the manufacture of wood, and mineral water companies.

The Qalqilya Zoo, established in 1986, is currently the only zoo in the West Bank and in Palestine, and, according to its owner, is the city's single-largest employer. It serves as one of Qalqilya's main attractions. The zoo houses 170 animals and works closely with zoologists from the Jerusalem Biblical Zoo and the Ramat Gan Safari. The only factory for prosthetic limbs in the northern West Bank is in Qalqilya.

=== Souqs ===
In Qalqilya there are many markets, including:

- Souq Abu Amsha (سوق أبو عمشة)
- Souq Shaheen (سوق شاهين)
- Souq Abu Jaber (سوق أبو جابر)
- Souq Beshara (سوق بشارة)
- Souq Uthman (سوق عثمان)
- Souq Um Tareq (سوق أم طارق)
- Souq Abu Aisha (سوق أبو عيشة)

=== Land usage and the barrier ===
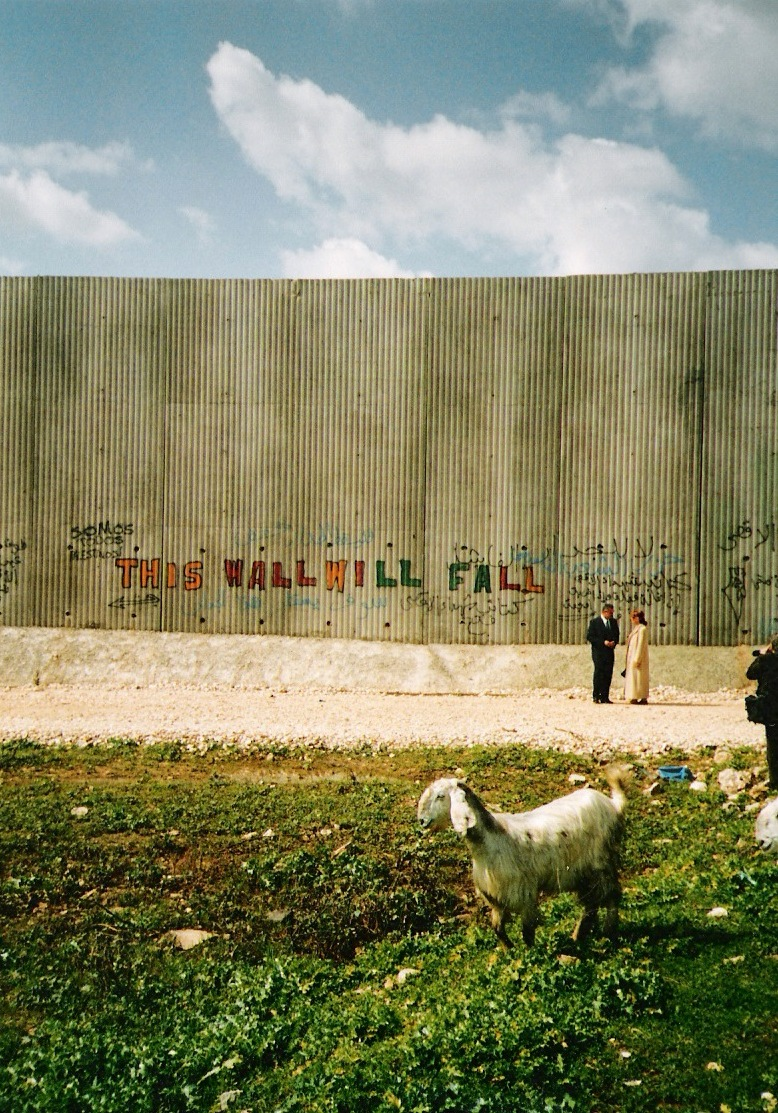
Couple near the West Bank Barrier

Of the city's total area of 10,252 dunams, 3,027 were built-up areas, 266 were used for industrial purposes, 2,894 were planted with permanent crops, 419 were used for greenhouses, 274 for livestock ranges, 2,343 others were classified as arable, and 283 dunams were occupied by the West Bank barrier. Nearly all of Qalqilya's urban area is under Palestinian civil jurisdiction and Israeli military control (Area B), while 64.7% of the city's municipal territory, mostly agricultural lands and open spaces, is under Israeli civil and military control (Area C).

Israel's construction of the barrier began in 2002 and isolates Qalqilya from the north, west, south, and half of its eastern side, leaving a corridor in the east connecting it with smaller Palestinian villages and hamlets. Israel states its construction of the wall is for security purposes, particularly to prevent infiltration by Palestinian militants into Israel as had occurred during the Second Intifada. The Palestinians state that the barrier is meant to annex Palestinian lands (since the wall often juts deep into Palestinian territory) and control the movement of Palestinians. The barrier has negatively affected Qalqilya's economy, particularly the commercial and trade sectors, because it has separated the city from nearby Palestinian localities and bordering Arab towns in Israel, which contributed about 40% of the city's income prior to the barrier's completion. The barrier has also separated 1,836 dunams of mostly agricultural lands and open spaces within Qalqilya's jurisdiction from the city proper. Social relations between Qalqilya's inhabitants and those of other Palestinian cities have also been hindered by the barrier.

== Education ==
According to the 2007 PCBS census, 95.3% of the inhabitants over the age of 10 were literate. About 75% of the illiterate population were women. The town has 21 public schools, four private schools, three schools managed by UNRWA and 13 kindergartens. All schools are overseen by the Palestinian Ministry of Higher Education. As of 2012, there were 12,286 residents enrolled in school, with 660 teaching staff. In 2007, 10.5% of the population had graduated from an institution of higher education, while 15.7% had completed secondary education, 27.5% preparatory education, 27.4% elementary education and 13.8% had no formal education. There are two colleges in the city: the Ad Da'wa Islamic College established in 1978 and a campus of the Al-Quds Open University established in 1998.

== Culture ==
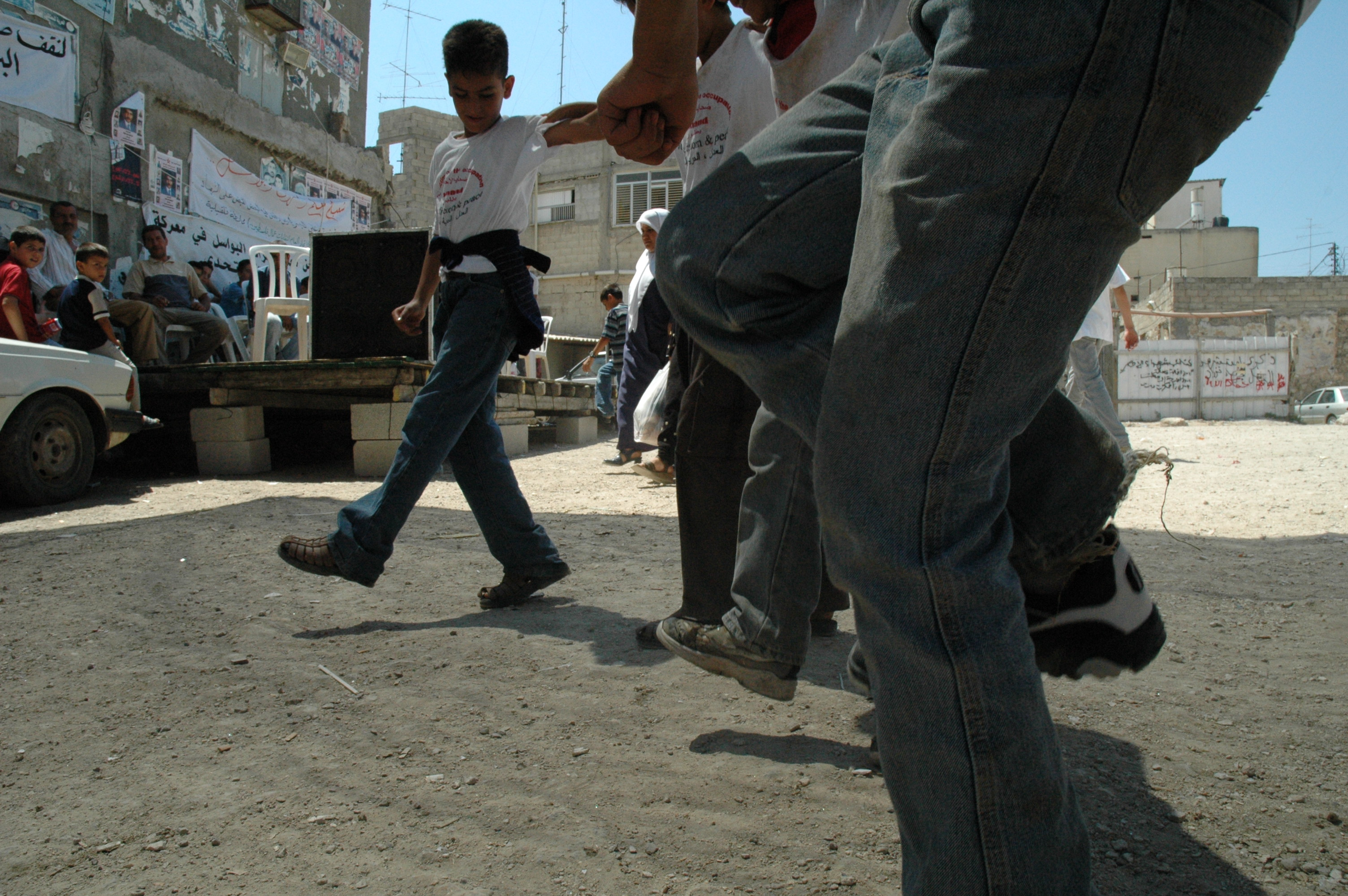
Palestinian boys practising dabke folk dancing in Qalqilya

There are charities, recreational and cultural clubs, Qalqilya TV, and a radio station (Radio Nagham). In the Qalqilya governorate, the NGO Cultural Forum Society (جمعية منتدى المثقفين الخيرية) played a role in publicizing the residents' economic and political problems due to the occupation, the wall, and settlements.

== Sister cities ==
Qalqilya's sister cities are:

- (United States) Gainesville, Florida
- Mülheim, Germany

== Notable people ==
- Bahaa Al-Din Dawood Bin Ismail Al-Qalqili, a scholar of the eighth century AH who taught in Aleppo and died in the year 780 AH, according to the book Fragments of Gold in News from Gold by Ibn General Shihab al-Din al-Hanbali al-Dimashqi
- Abu Ali Iyad, Fatah field commander in Jordan and Syria
- Najm al-Din Muhammad ibn Ahmad al-Qalqili, a scholar born in Qalqilya who moved to Al-Quds Al-Sharif as a child and later went Cairo to study at Al-Azhar University. In Egypt he compiled his book Ghani al-Murayd to know perfection and intonation, completed in 882 AH
- Khair al-Din Abu al-Khair Ahmad bin Shihab al-Din Ahmad bin Muhammad al-Qalqili, a reciter of Quran (died in 89 AH)
- Sheikh Mustafa Sabry (1870–1957), a religious orator (khatib خطيب) and reformer
- Ibrahim Ahmed Al-Shanti (Qalqilya, 1927–Amman, 2018), a writer and journalist
- Hashem El-Seba (1912–1957), a Palestinian militant
- Muayad Afaneh, (born 1975), prepared an analytical paper on the political, economic and social situation of Qalqilya Governorate

== Gallery ==
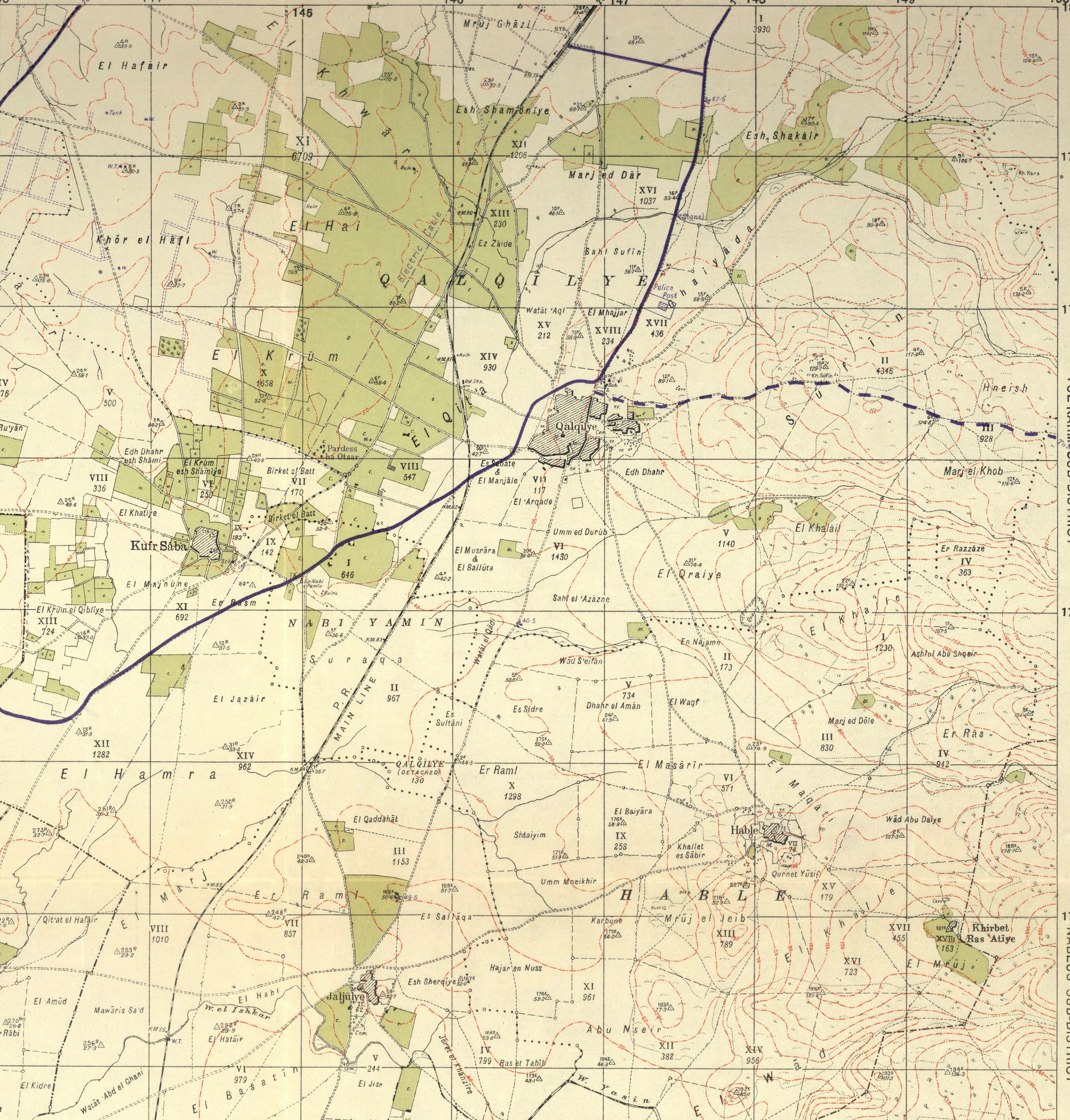
Qalqilya in 1942 (1:20,000 scale)

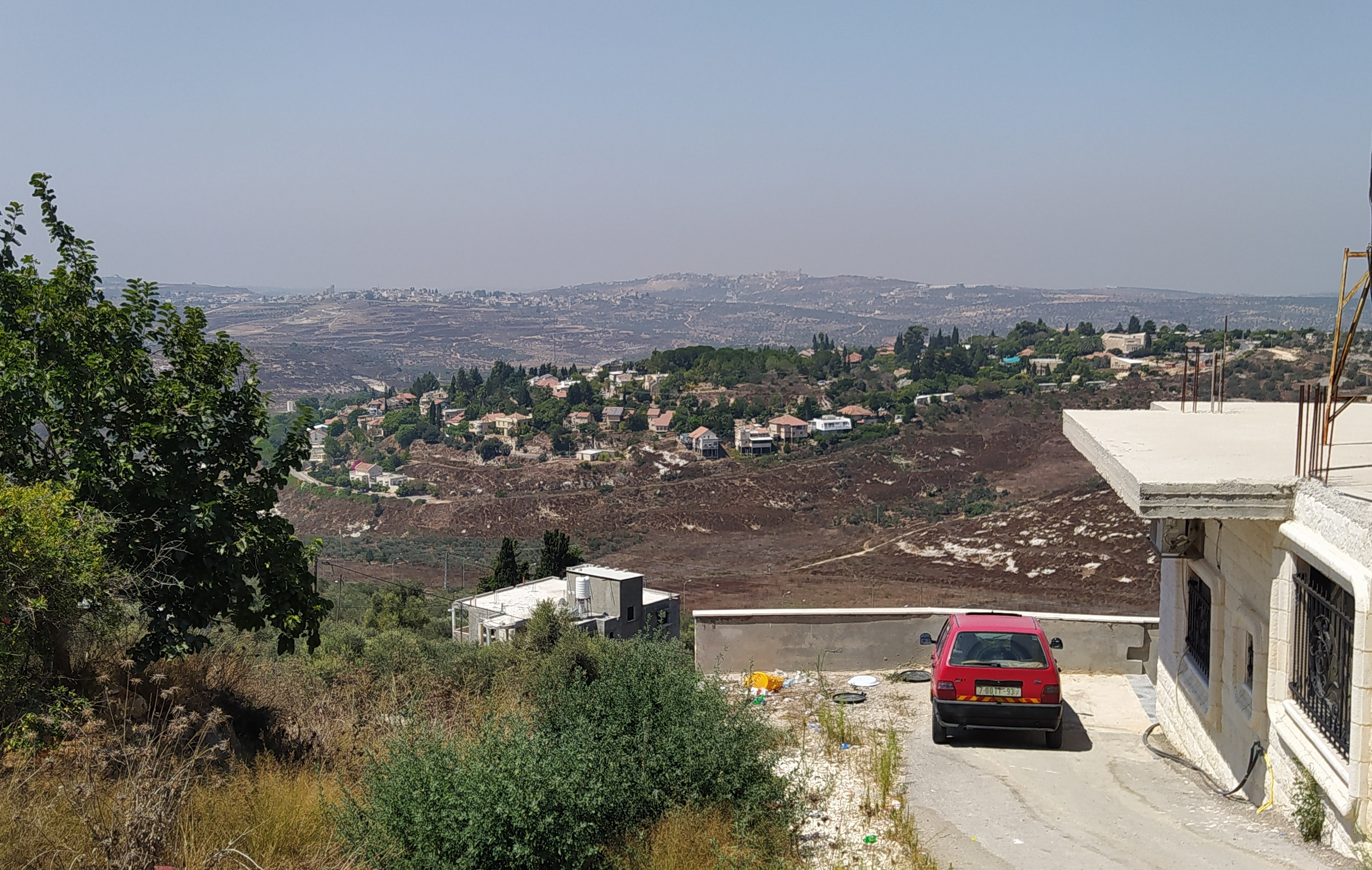
Jit, a neighborhood of Qalqilya

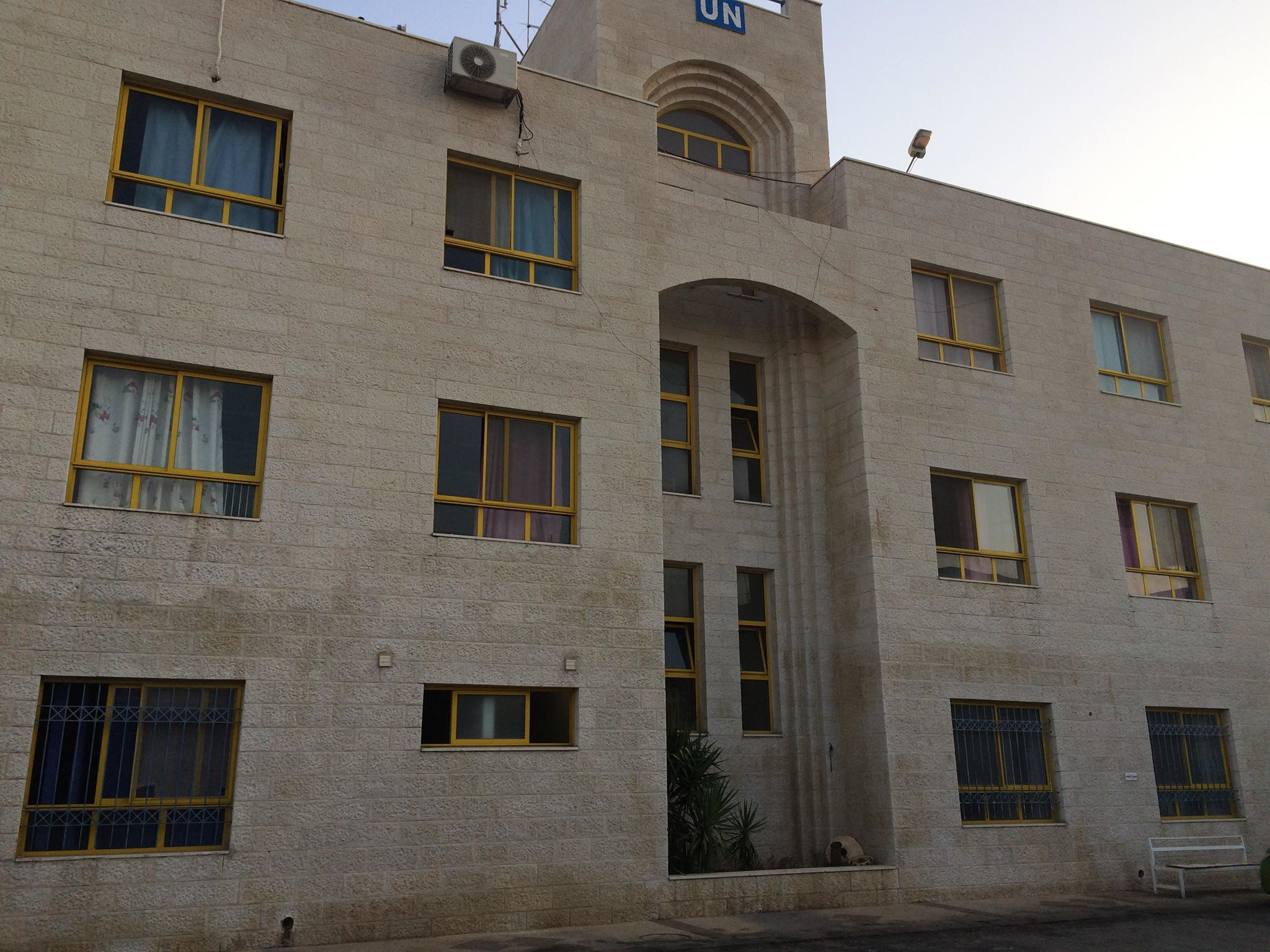
UNRWA Hospital building in Qalqilya

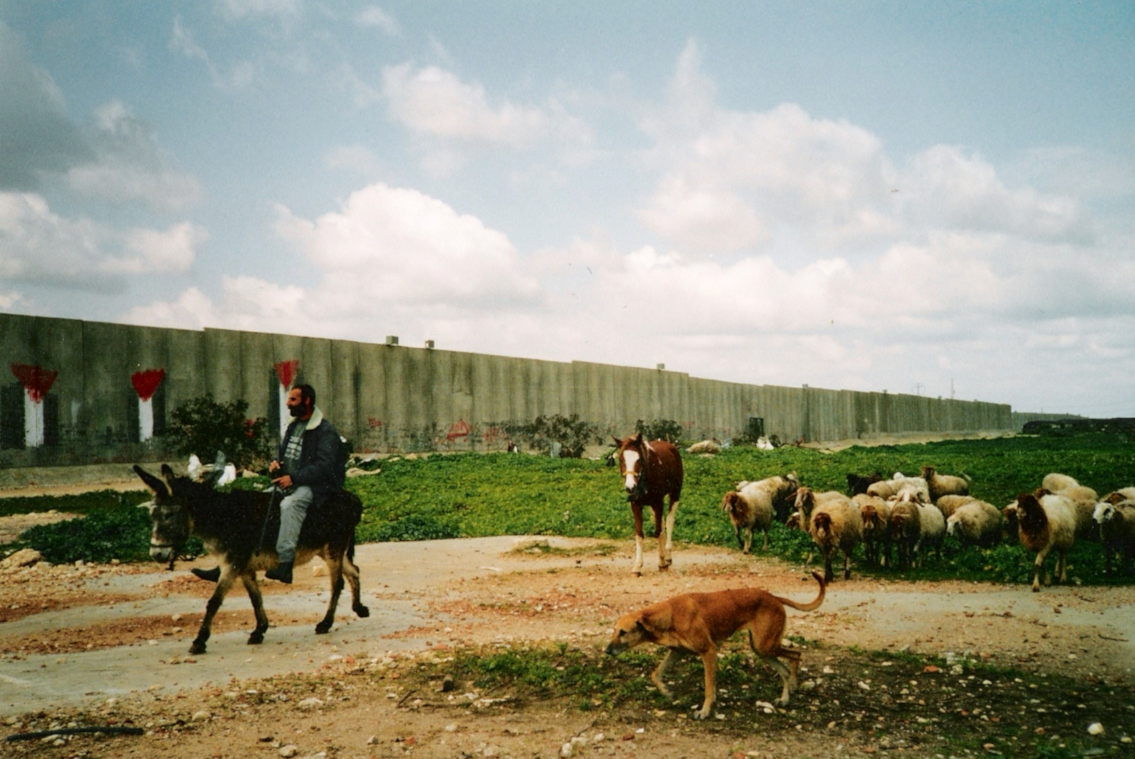
Farmer in Qalqiliya

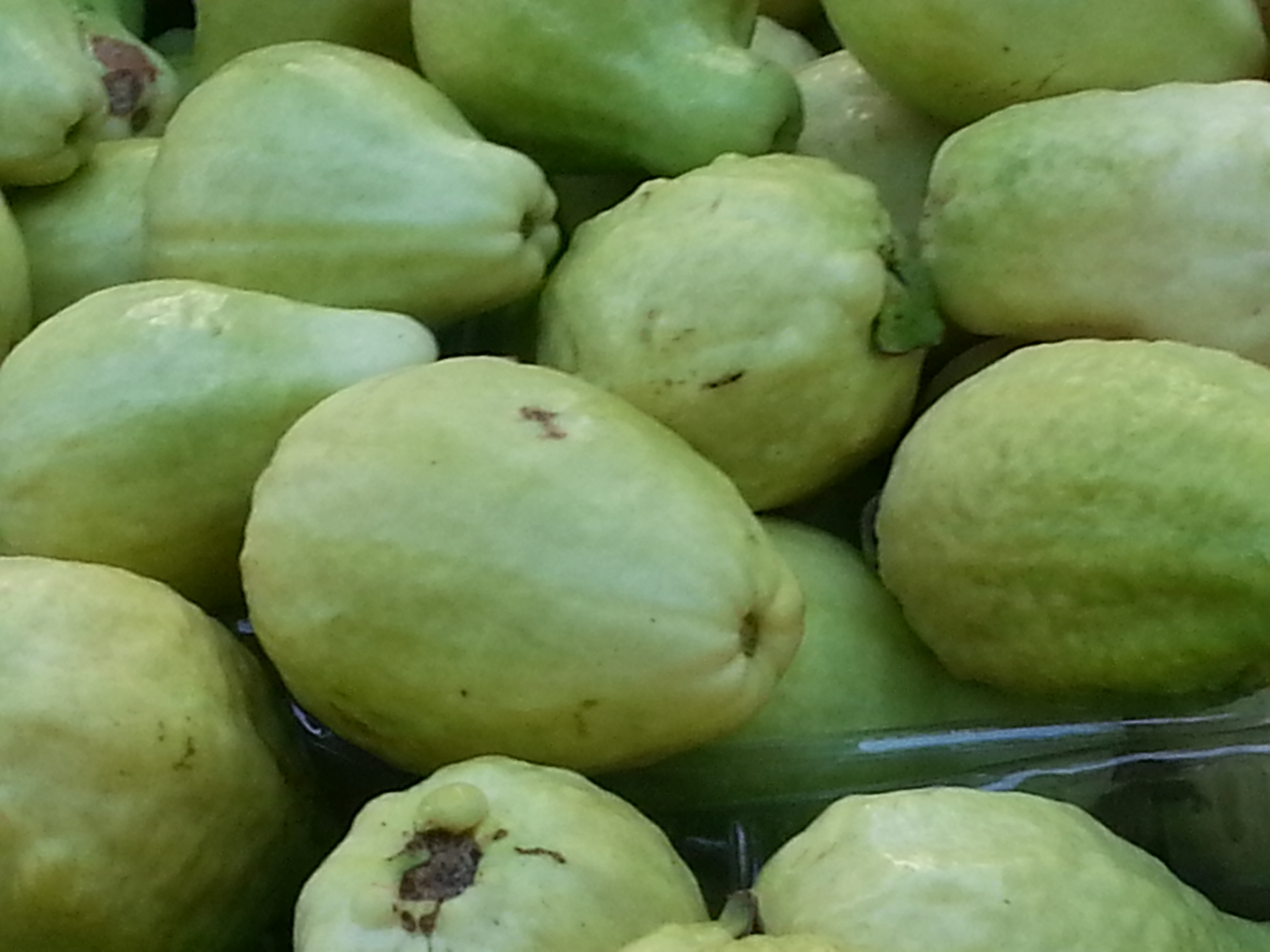
Guava after being picked from a plantation in Qalqilya

== Bibliography ==
- Barron, J.B., ed. (1923). Palestine: Report and General Abstracts of the Census of 1922. Government of Palestine.
- Conder, C.R.; Kitchener, H.H. (1882). The Survey of Western Palestine: Memoirs of the Topography, Orography, Hydrography, and Archaeology. Vol. 2. London: Committee of the Palestine Exploration Fund.
- Elon, A. (1983). The Israelis: founders and sons. Penguin Books. ISBN 978-0-14-016969-0.
- Government of Jordan, Department of Statistics (1964). First Census of Population and Housing. Volume I: Final Tables; General Characteristics of the Population (PDF).
- Government of Palestine, Department of Statistics (1945). Village Statistics, April, 1945.
- Guérin, V. (1875). Description Géographique Historique et Archéologique de la Palestine (in French). Vol. 2: Samarie, pt. 2. Paris: L'Imprimerie Nationale.
- Hadawi, S. (1970). Village Statistics of 1945: A Classification of Land and Area ownership in Palestine. Palestine Liberation Organization Research Center.
- Hütteroth, W.-D.; Abdulfattah, K. (1977). Historical Geography of Palestine, Transjordan and Southern Syria in the Late 16th Century. Erlanger Geographische Arbeiten, Sonderband 5. Erlangen, Germany: Vorstand der Fränkischen Geographischen Gesellschaft. ISBN 3-920405-41-2.
- Mills, E., ed. (1932). Census of Palestine 1931. Population of Villages, Towns and Administrative Areas. Jerusalem: Government of Palestine.
- Morris, B. (1993). Israel's Border Wars, 1949 – 1956. Arab Infiltration, Israeli Retaliation, and the Countdown to the Suez War. Oxford University Press. ISBN 0-19-827850-0.
- Morris, B. (2001). Righteous victims: a history of the Zionist-Arab conflict, 1881-2001. Vintage Books. ISBN 978-0-679-74475-7.
- Palmer, E.H. (1881). The Survey of Western Palestine: Arabic and English Name Lists Collected During the Survey by Lieutenants Conder and Kitchener, R. E. Transliterated and Explained by E.H. Palmer. Committee of the Palestine Exploration Fund.
- Robinson, E.; Smith, E. (1841). Biblical Researches in Palestine, Mount Sinai and Arabia Petraea: A Journal of Travels in the year 1838. Vol. 3. Boston: Crocker & Brewster.
