= Deir Asfin =

Coordinates: 32°15′15″N 34°56′50″E

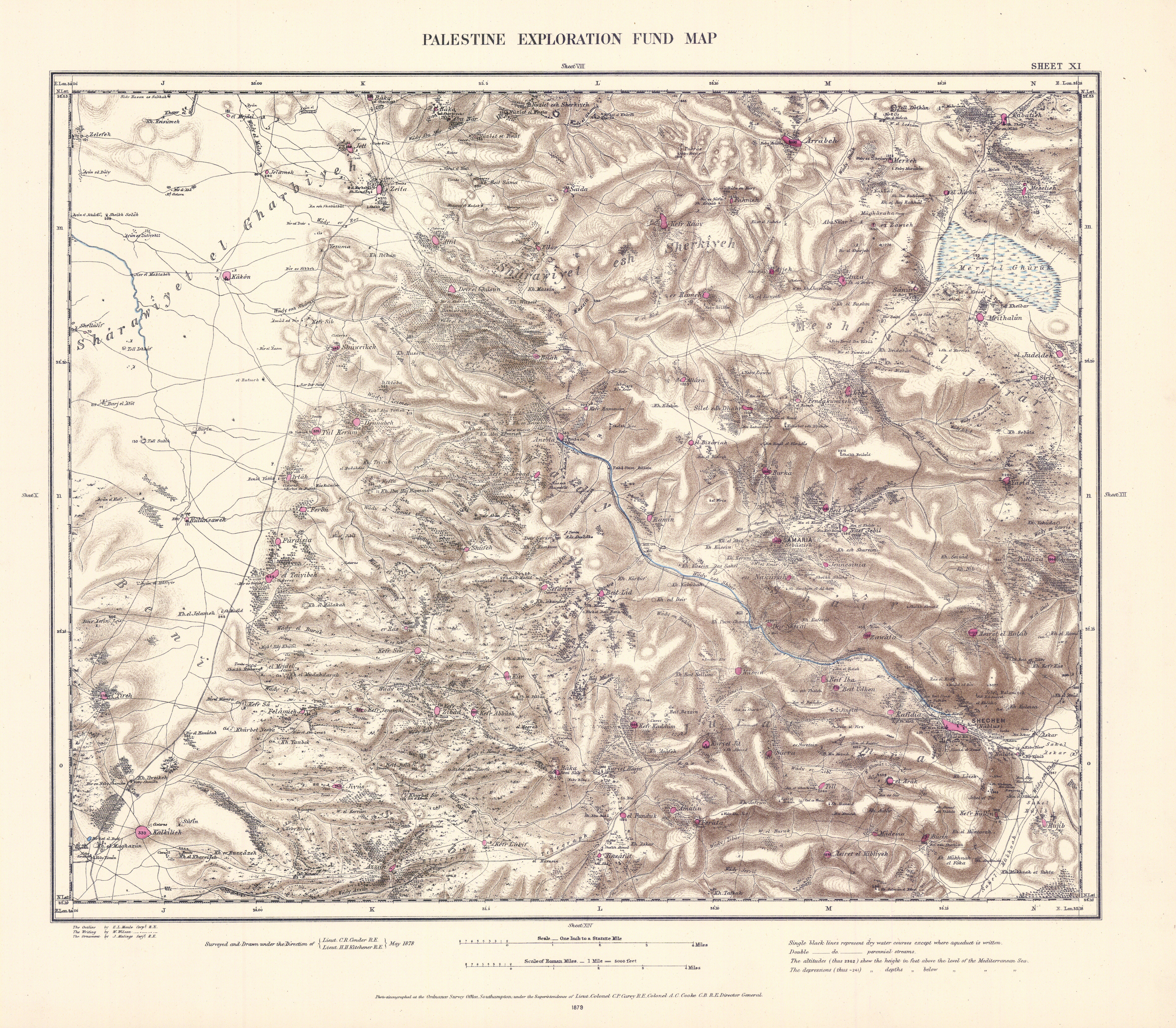
Sheet XI of the Survey of Western Palestine, showing Deir ʿAsfīn in the lower left

Deir ʿAsfīn (Arabic: دير عسفين, "Convent of Deviation") was a former monastery in Ottoman Palestine located just north of Tira in present-day Israel. It appeared on Sheet XI of the 19th-century Survey of Western Palestine and its peak formed the highest point of the Falik Hills in the maritime plains south of Mount Carmel, with an elevation of 92 meters (302 ft) above sea level.

== History ==
It has also been identified as the location of the Theraspis (Ancient Greek: Θερασπις) that appears on the Madaba Map of 6th-century Byzantine Palestine.

=== Ottoman era ===
Deir Asfin was incorporated into the Ottoman Empire in 1517 with all of Palestine, and in 1596 it appeared in the tax registers as being in the Nahiya of Bani Sa'b of the Liwa of Nablus. It had a population of 30 households and 2 bachelors, all Muslim. The villagers paid a fixed tax-rate of 33,3% various agricultural products, including wheat (3550 a.), barley (500 a.), summer crops (300 a.), olives (2500 a.) goats and/or beehives (100 a.) in addition to occasional revenues and jizya; a total of 7,500 akçe. All the revenues went to a waqf.

In 1882, the PEF's Survey of Western Palestine found at Deir Asfin: "Foundations, heaps of stones, ruined cisterns, fragments of tesselated pavement."
