= Tira, Israel =

Arab city in central Israel

Tira: טִירָה; الطيرة
- City

Hebrew transcription(s)
  - ISO 259: Ṭira
  - Also spelled: Tire (official)
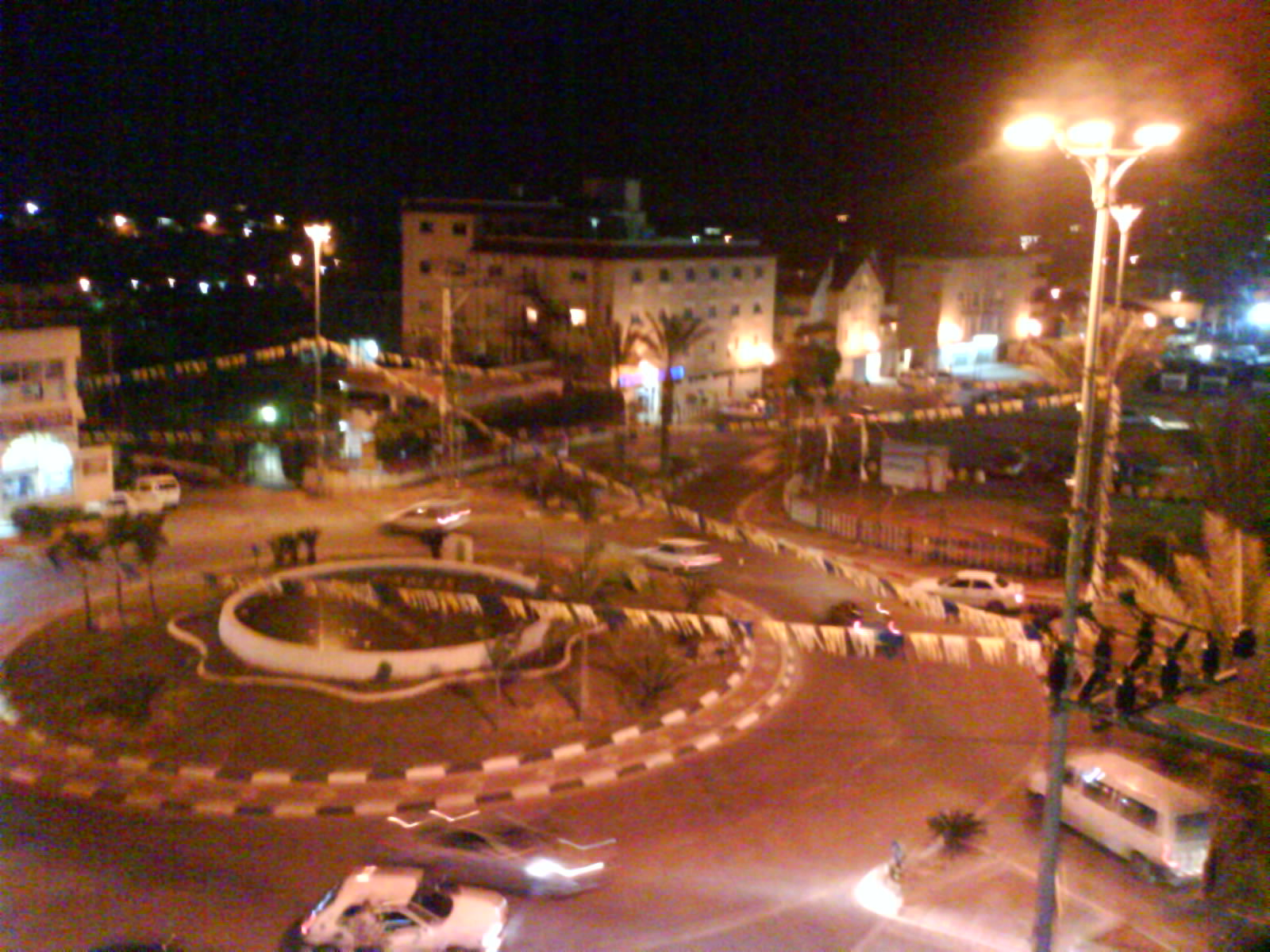

- Location within Central Israel Location within Israel
- Coordinates: 32°13′56″N 34°56′54″E
- Grid position: 145/182 PAL
- Country: Israel
- District: Central
- Subdistrict: HaSharon
- Natural Region: Eastern Sharon

Government
  - Mayor: Mamoun Abd al-Hay

Area
  - Total: 11,894 dunams (11.894 km^{2}; 4.592 sq mi)

Population (2024)
  - Total: 27,680
  - Density: 2,327/km^{2} (6,027/sq mi)
- Name meaning: The High Land

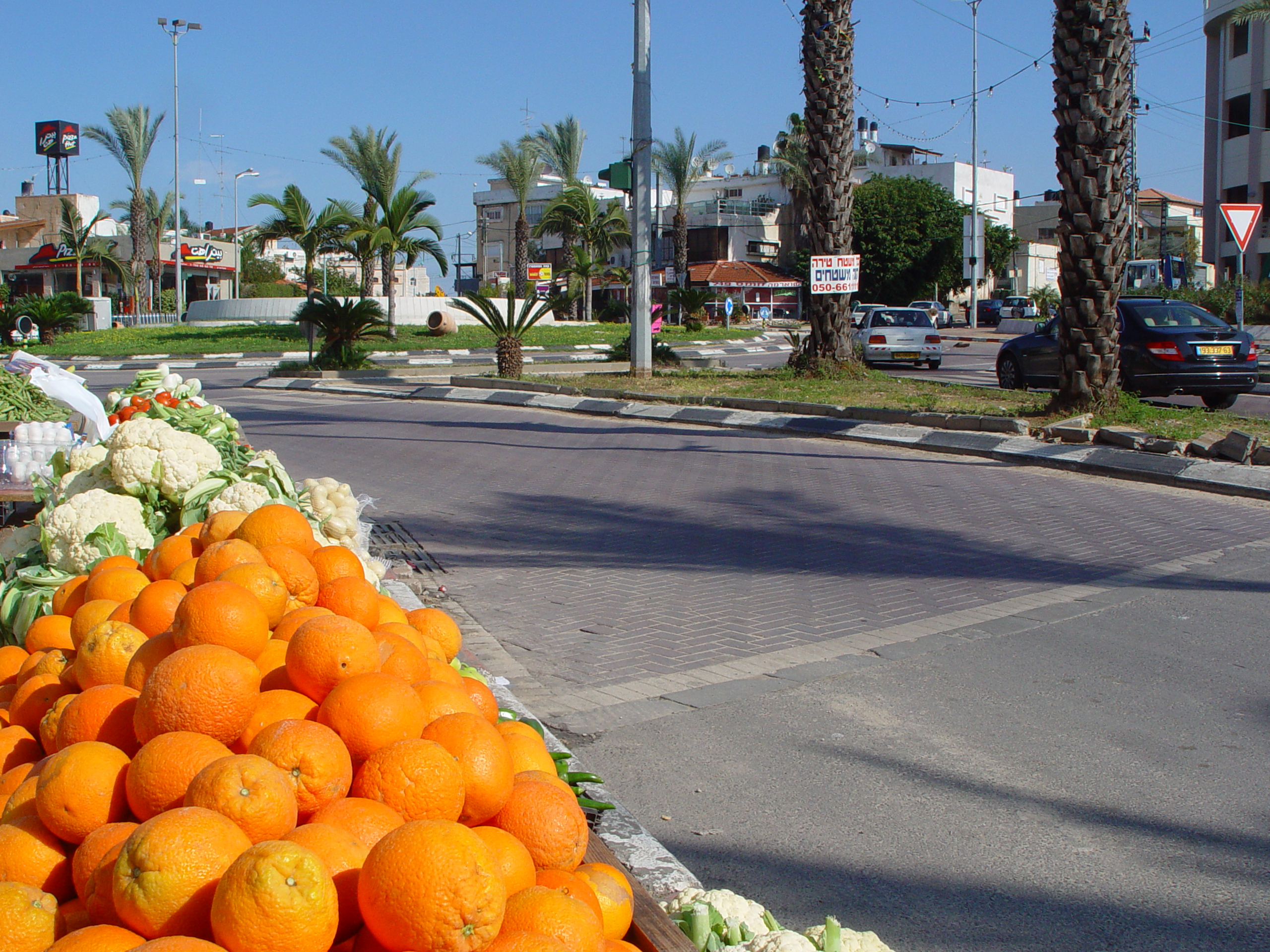
Tira's southern entrance

Tira (Arabic: الطيرة, romanized: aṭ-Ṭīra, Hebrew: טִירָה, lit. "Fort";), is an Arab city in the Central District of Israel. Part of the Triangle, a concentration of Arab towns and villages adjacent to the Green Line, Tira is close to Kfar Saba. It is known for its weekly market and Arab cuisine.

Located within Israel's fertile bread basket, Tira is surrounded by agricultural fields owned by both Arabs and Jews. Today youth employment prospects are low, which has contributed to the city's high crime rate. In 2024, the city had a population of 27,680.

In the 18th century, it was settled by people from Hajjah and Baqa. Today, its population has diverse origins.

== Names ==
Tira has historically called Tirat Bani Sa'b (طيرة بني صعب) and today known as Tirat al-Muthallath ("Tira in the Triangle"), to distinguish it from similar named villages.

== History ==
The town of Theraspis (modern Deir 'Asfin) recorded on the 6th-century Madaba Map was located 1 km north of al-Tira.

=== Middle Ages ===
In the 12th century, during the Crusader period, the village of Tira was owned by the Order of St. John and was leased to Robert of Sinjil and his heirs. In the 14th and 15th century, the village was a stop on the road between Gaza and Damascus, and a khan (inn) was constructed.

Grossman concludes that although Tira was occupied during Mamluk times, it was subsequently abandoned, becoming a seasonal or temporary settlement for a long period.

=== Ottoman Empire ===
Tira is not documented in 16th-century records. In the 18th century, it was resettled by Bani Sa'b tribesmen from Hajjah and Baqa. Oral history claims the first residents dug up ancient masonry from Dier 'Asfin for reuse in the construction of the new village. Deir 'Asfin was still inhabited in the 16th century, but became abandoned sometime before Napoleon's campaign. Pierre Jacotin called the village "Ertahah" on his map from 1799, mixing it up with the name of Irtah, now part of Tulkarm.

As the conditions of security on the plains improved in the Late Ottoman period, the peasants on the safer hilltop villages who had used the land seasonally began to settle more permanently around the khirbas. Until then, they would pass the winter in the hills and shift down in spring for agricultural needs. In Tira's case, the modern population descended from the village of Bāqat al-Ḥaṭab. The Maṣārwa, Arab immigrants from Egypt formed a sub-class which lacked a traditional hamula (clan) structure. Because they did not own land, they hired themselves out as agricultural labourers.

In the 1860s, the Ottoman authorities granted the village an agricultural plot of land called Ghabat al-Tira in the forest of Arsur (Ar. Al-Ghaba) in the coastal plain, west of the village.

By 1870, Victor Guérin found a "village of seven hundred inhabitants, with gardens planted with fig trees and pomegranates, separated from each other by hedges of cactus." In 1870/1871 (1288 AH), an Ottoman census listed the village in the nahiya (sub-district) of Bani Sa'b.

In 1882, the Palestine Exploration Fund's Survey of Western Palestine described "et-Tîreh" as "a conspicuous village on a knoll in the plain, surrounded by olives, with a well on the west side." It was located just south of the monastery Deir 'Asfin on the survey's Plate XI.

=== British Mandate ===
In the 1922 census of Palestine conducted by the British Mandate authorities, "Tireh" had a population of 1,588 inhabitants; 1,582 Muslims and 6 Orthodox Christians, increasing in the 1931 census to 2,192; 2,190 Muslims and 2 Christians, in a total of 380 houses.

Of the three village councils established in the area by the Mandatory Authorities in the 1940s, one was in Tira (the other two in Baqa al-Gharbiyye and Tayibe). Prior to 1948, one kibbutz and two moshavs near Tira—Ramat HaKovesh, Kfar Hess and Herut—were established after Tira owners sold their properties to Jewish communities. In the 1945 statistics, Tira had 3,180 Muslim inhabitants, who owned a total of 26,803 dunams of land.

In 1945, Tira's village lands had extended over 31,359 dunams, of which 26,803 were Arab, and 3,720 under Jewish ownership.

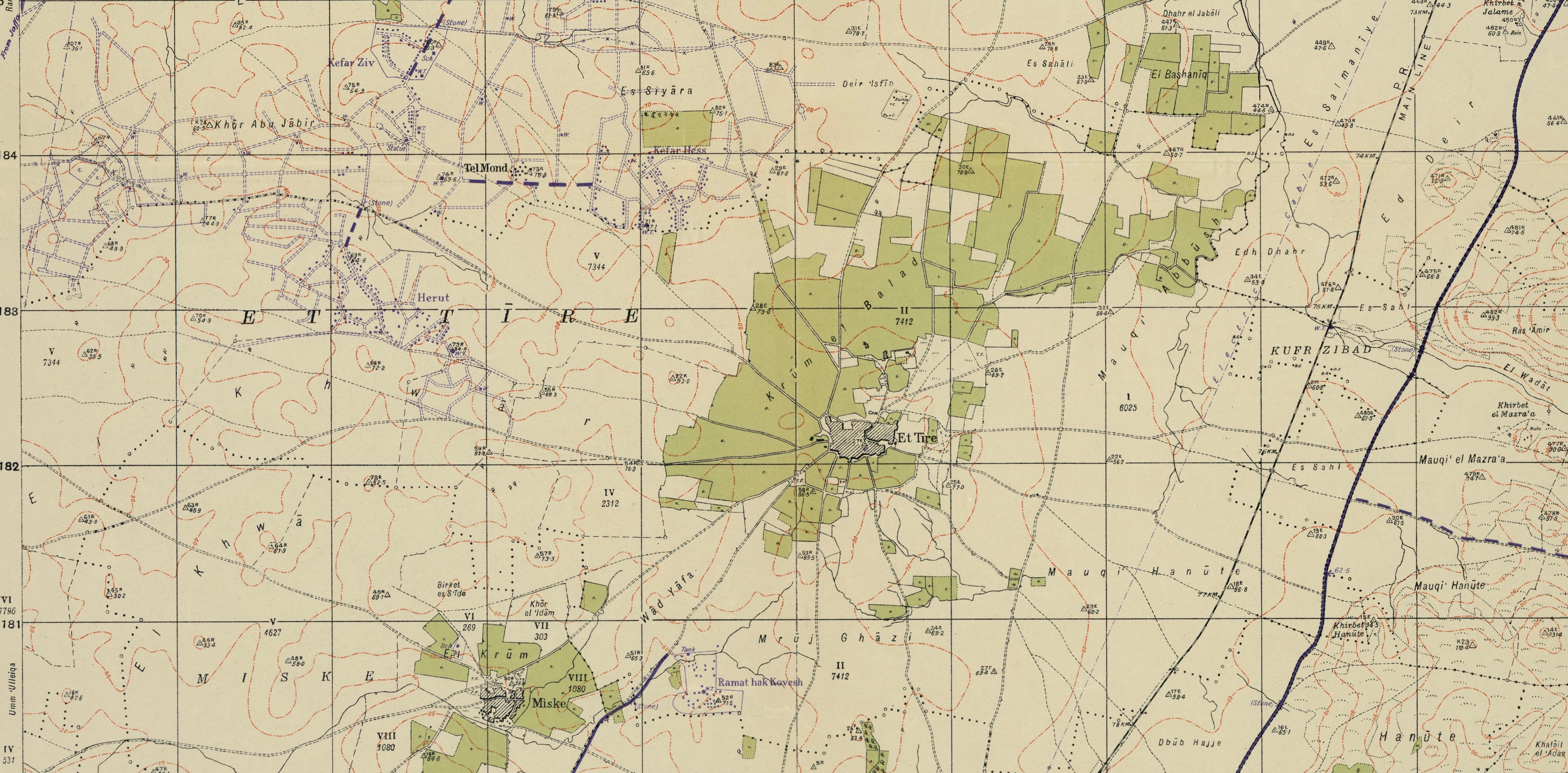
Tira (Et Tire) 1942 1:20,000

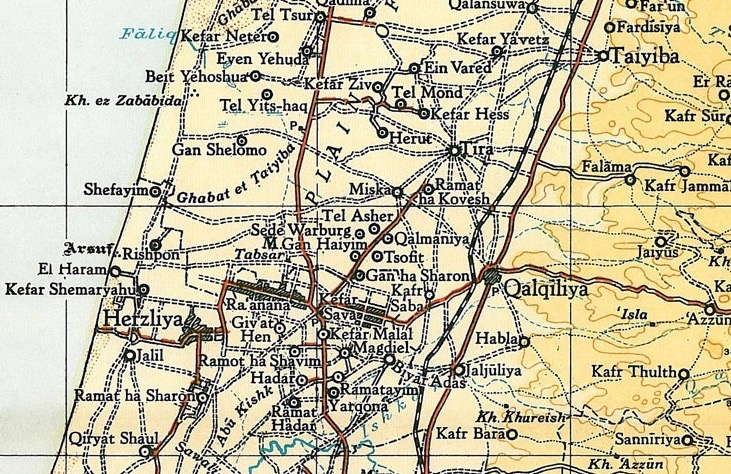
Tira 1945 1:250,000

=== Israel ===
==== 1948–1949 ====
During the 1948 Arab-Israeli war, the Alexandroni Brigade was ordered to capture and raze Tira. However, the village was occupied by Iraqi troops and did not come under Israeli control until May 1949, in the framework the Jordan-Israeli Armistice Agreement.

On February 10, 1948 a lorry carrying 12 Arabs returning to Tireh from Tulkarm was ambushed by a large group of Jews. A report in the Scotsman newspaper stated that “The Arabs were forced to march into orange grove alongside the road and mowed down by gunfire.” Seven of the group were killed and the remaining five wounded.

The war had cut off Tira's inhabitants from their fields. After the Armistice, Israel placed the area in the Triangle it had won control of under the administration of its Custodian of Enemy Property, which entailed treating the farmlands of towns like Tira according to its Absentees Property Law. Since the owners had, however, never left the area or abandoned their property, they were defined as present absentees. (Note: "Many of those who were defined as absentee and whose property had been taken over by the Custodian were actually present in Israel at the time. These are the people who became known as the 'present absentees.'..Even the residents of the villages of the Triangle who never left their homes were classified as absentees. In this case, Transjordan held the villages at the end of fighting, but not their farmland to the west, which was under Israeli control. The villages were transferred to Israel by the Rhodes Armistice Agreement of 1949, and the villagers were ostensibly reunited with their lands. Although they had not left their homes, they had been in an area controlled by the Transajordanian Legion and separated from their land, and that was now taken as absentee property." (Wesley 2013, p. 110))

A clause in the cease-fire agreement with Jordan stipulated that Israel lay under an obligation to respect the property rights of the citizens in the Triangle. Several attempts over the years to reverse the designation of the property owners, who had become Israeli citizens overnight, as "present absentees" in order to reclaim their land were rebuffed, the Supreme Court of Israel stating that international agreements signed by the Israeli government were not justiciable in Israel's courts. (Note: "Since treaties which have not been transformed into municipal law have no effect in the Israel legal system, a fortiori these treaties are not applied if they contradict Israeli law." (Lapidoth 1990, pp. 458–459))

==== 1950s–1960s ====
Over the years 1953–1954, Israel expropriated a block of 5,232 dunams and, by 1962, of the original total, 8,599 dunams remained for village use. The family-clan structure of its residents has not changed since then. Tira, like all other Arab towns in Israel, was placed under military rule, a system not formally abolished until 1966, (Note: "In the early years of statehood, the Arabs in Israel were perceived as a 'security problem'. They were regarded as a small part of the Arab world and a potential 'fifth column'. The first prime minister of Israel, David Ben-Gurion, was quoted as saying 'the Arabs have to be judged according to what they could do and not according to what they have actually done'.' (Abu Rass 2002, p. 65)) and in which considerations of jurisdiction were always decided without local consultation, by talks between the military governor and the Ministry of the Interior. This changed in the 1980s, when each town was allowed to have an Arab representative in such councils.

Though Israel abolished the village councils in Tira, and elsewhere, established by the British, in 1952 Tira was given local council status In the township, municipal elections are regarded as far more important than national elections, since the allocation of municipal jobs, the winners' spoils, depends on who wins control of the council. Politically in these early decades, Tira voted predominantly for Israeli left wing parties. (Note: In the national elections of 1959, votes in Tira were fairly split between supporters of Communists (375) Mapam (329) and religious (315) (Cohen 1965, p. 169).)According to Sabri Jiryis, in 1956 the then governor had two members of the Tira local council banished in order to stop them from voting in the elections for a new chairman. He favoured the candidate proposed by General Zionists, the party the governor belonged to, and, once the 2 Arabs were banished, the governor's candidate managed to secure a majority. During the 1965 Knesset elections, Moshe Dayan addressed 3,000 people in the village and stated that the official Israeli policy regarding the integration of its Arab citizens was going too far: integration was "unnecessary" and would not take place.

On the eve of the 1956 Suez Crisis, Tira was one of the border villages subject to a snap curfew. The Border Police officer in charge of Tira, Arye Menashes, asked his commander what to do with the returning villagers who were unaware of the curfew and understood the curt response as meaning that he should kill them. Menashes asked if that applied to women and children, and was told that it did. In the event, unlike at the nearby village of Kfar Qasim where the Border Police murdered 48 people, Menashes decided to disobey the order and allowed the villagers to return to their homes safely.

===== Al-Ard sports club =====
An attempt in 1957 to set up a sports club in Tira was suppressed by the Shin Bet, who considered such associations subversive. In 1958 the Al-Ard movement was established by Israeli Arabs to press for equality between Israeli Arabs and Jews. The movement dissented from the view held by Arab Knesset representatives who supported continuing military rule over Israel's Arab communities. The movement was banned in a decision by the Israeli Supreme Court, with judge Moshe Landau declaring that it posed a threat to Israeli security. After its dissolution, Israel cracked down on Arab sports clubs, on the supposition that such associations were supported by al-Ard, closing one in Taibeh. The Tira sports club re-opened however in 1961, and came to be regarded as a leader in the region's Amal movement. When it programmed a festive sports day in April 1964, the government response was to place 5 key club members based in Tira and nearby Kafr Qara members under administrative detention, and subject the two villages to a military closure. Those who did attend the events were arrested. Tira's Tariq 'Abd al-Hayy, had himself supported their closure. Tira resisted pressure by government officials to close down its own club's activities until late 1968, when the authorities ordered its closure when the Ministry of Defence declared it illegal on the grounds that one of the members was associated with Fatah. Later, when the Land Day movement arose, al-Hayy, by then mayor of Tira and a member of the Israeli Labor Party, clamped down on this expression of Palestinian nationalism by repressing the inaugural Land Day strike in Tira. Over 100 policemen were deployed to break the strike, with several villagers shot and some 40 wounded. (Note: Al-Hayy later regretted his role in the suppression of Arab aspirations, left the Labor Party and joined the Communist-dominated Hadash party (Cohen 1965, p. 200).)

==== 1970s–1990s: Development and land seizures ====
The narrowing of developmental space has meant that land purchases for ownership in the Triangle were four to five times higher per dunam than the price for 49 year land rents in areas where Jewish villages have been established. The land available for Triangle Arabs has been dwindling through expropriation, pari passu with the growth of their populations. Further slimming took place in the 1980s, when the land under the council's jurisdiction was 12,664 dunams, as portions were reassigned to the Drom HaSharon Regional Council. By 1993, land owned by Tira residents amounted to 11,750 dunams, meaning 0.78 dunams (780 square metres) per person. The Israel Land Authority exercises jurisdiction over 1,000 dunams within this area.

Over the following years, 1994–1995, further confiscations took place, when a network of high-tension power lines to service Jewish settlements was built along the predominantly private owned Trans-Israel toll highway, which itself was calculated to cause the confiscation of over 4,000 dunams of private Arab land in the Triangle, and the infrastructure, with its 300 metres leeway moved off the highway and ran through Tira agricultural tracts, leading to further restrictions of land use. (Note: Certain crops can be grown, but green houses are disallowed (Abu Rass 1997, p. 192).) Tira had a further 950 dunams confiscated, and 400 subjected to limitations on use. Residents of Tira and other affected villages protested, arguing that the power lines could have overlapped with the non-construction zone running along the highway, an objection that had led to the rerouting of the lines in the case of the Jewish kibbutz of Eyal. Their petition was rejected by the Supreme Court of Israel. Repeated attempts to reclaim lost land and allow expansion to cope with demographic growth (1983, 1984, 1985, 1986, 1988) were rejected by the Ministry of the Interior. A request to have 400 dunams of land reincorporated under Tira jurisdiction, land owned by Tira residents who pay taxes to the Lev HaSharon Regional Council, was still pending in 1997.

Tira was granted city status in 1991.

==== 21st century ====
In 2019 a program to build a new neighbourhood on 161 dunam of government land was approved.

The Trump peace plan negotiated between Israel and the United States but without Palestinian interlocutors, introduced the possibility of stripping the 350,000 Israeli Arabs in the Triangle, and therefore the citizens of Tira, of their Israeli citizenship rights by transferring that area to an eventual State of Palestine. The prospect is unnerving to the communities that might be affected.

The Eastern Railway, under construction as of 2026, passes near the town. The Tira-Kokhav Yair station opened in June 2026.

== Demographics ==
Historical population
Year	Pop.	±%
1972	8,500	—
1983	10,400	+22.4%
1995	15,800	+51.9%
2008	22,200	+40.5%
2022	26,567	+19.7%
2024	27,680	+4.2%

According to CBS, in 2004 the ethnic makeup of the city was 99.9% Sunni Muslim Arab citizens of Israel. A small number of Jews also live in Tira, drawn by the cheaper housing costs compared with other nearby Jewish localities, such as Kfar Saba. In the 1990s it witnessed an average annual population increase of 2.8%.

From a population of 3,180 inhabitants in 1945, by 2019 Tira's population had grown to 26 872.

== Income ==
As of 2000, there were 3,654 salaried workers and 953 self-employed individuals in the city, according to the CBS. The mean monthly wage in 2000 for a salaried worker in the city is ILS 3,767, a real change of 2.4% over the course of 2000. Salaried males have a mean monthly wage of ILS 4,494 (a real change of 6.1%) versus ILS 2,319 for females (a real change of −13.0%). The mean income for the self-employed is 4,289. There are 69 people who receive unemployment benefits and 1,183 people who receive an income guarantee. In 2004, 41.9% of the population was part of the workforce.

== Education ==
According to CBS, there are 10 schools and 4,735 students in the city. There are seven elementary schools with 2,896 students, and three high schools with 1,839 students. Of 12th grade students, 64.8% were entitled to a matriculation certificate in 2001.

In 2004, 6.5% of the population had 0 years of education, 17.1% had up to 8 years, 55% had 9 to 12 years, 11.8% had 13–15 years, and 9.7% had 16 or more years of education. Ten percent had an academic degree.

The city's schools include:

1. Al-Zahraa
2. Al-Najah
3. Al-G'azali
4. Al-Majd
5. Al-Aomareya
6. Junior High A
7. Junior High B
8. Junior High c(g)
9. Amal 1- Ibrahim Qsaem High School
10. Technological High School
11. Tira's Science High School

High school students from Tira have received scholarships from Israeli universities and participate in exchange programs such as Y.E.S (Bureau of Educational and Cultural Affairs), Seeds of Peace, and CISV.

== Violence ==
Between 2011 and 2019, 31 homicides were recorded in Tira, equivalent to a rate of 12 per 10,000 people – the fifth highest rate within Israel during the period – according to one study. In 2012, Tira's leaders complained that the police treated Arabs as second class citizens and did not properly investigate crime. A permanent police station was only established in Tira in May 2013. A 2021 crime review suggests that little has changed since, showing that only 1 of 8 murders in Tira since 2020 had been solved, compared to 71% of murders in Jewish communities.

At the time of the establishment of the police station in 2013, it was noted that a contributing problem to the policing of communities such as Tira was the inadequate co-operation with the local population. In 2021, Tira's mayor claimed that the lack of a witness protection program for Arab communities contributed to the fear of providing evidence. A police spokesperson also correlated the rise in crime to the low employment prospects for Arab Israeli youth. According to Nimer Sultany, an Arab-Israeli and a law professor from Tira, the high crime and poverty rate can be traced back to decades of land confiscation, home demolition, incarceration and discrimination in education and employment in the traditionally agricultural town. (Note: "Tira used to be an agricultural town. Decades of confiscation, home demolitions, incarceration, and discrimination in education, employment and welfare made my town, like virtually every Arab town in Israel, a ghetto with substandard schools and high rates of poverty and crime." (Sultany 2021))

== Voting Patterns ==
In the 2022 election, 96 percent of voters in Tira voted for the Arab parties, while 3 percent voted for the parties of the center-left coalition led by Yair Lapid and 1 percent voted for the parties of the right-wing coalition led by Benjamin Netanyahu. Among the voters for the Arab parties, 36 percent voted for Balad, while 33 percent voted for Ra'am and 30 percent voted for the Hadash–Ta'al list.

In the 2026 election, 96 percent of voters in Tira voted for the Arab parties, while 3 percent voted for the parties of the center-left coalition led by Gadi Eisenkot and 0.2 percent voted for the parties of the right-wing coalition led by Benjamin Netanyahu. Among the voters for the Arab parties, 73 percent voted for the Joint List, while 27 percent voted for Ra'am. Voter turnout increased 42 percent from the 2022 election.

== Sister cities ==
Tira is twinned with:

- Burg bei Magdeburg, Germany.

== Notable people ==
- Dalia Fadila (1971 or 72 – 2023), educator and entrepreneur
- Sayed Kashua (born 1975), author and journalist
- Nimer Sultany, law scholar and constitutionalist

== See also ==
- Arab localities in Israel
