= Baqat al-Hatab =

- Local Development Committee

Arabic transcription(s)
  - Arabic: باقة الحطب
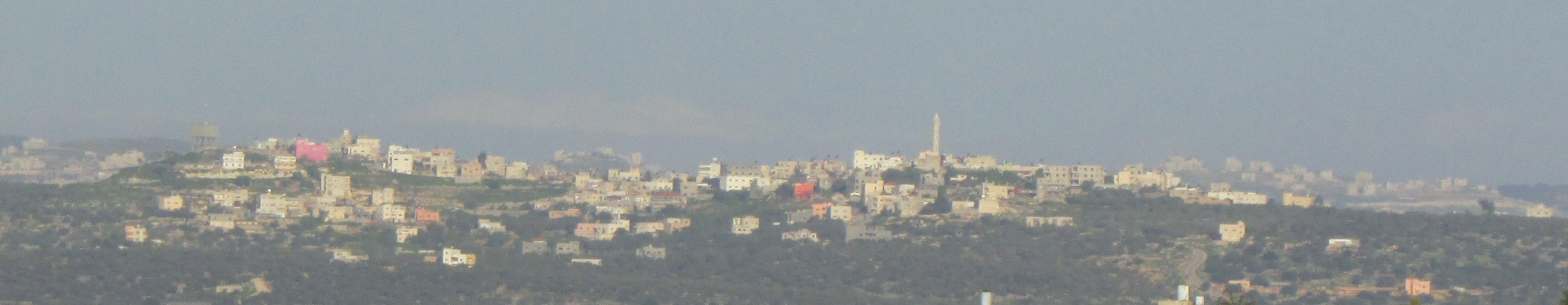
- Baqat al-Hatab

- Location of Baqat al-Hatab within Palestine
- Coordinates: 32°12′17″N 35°06′53″E
- Palestine grid: 161/179
- State: State of Palestine
- Governorate: Qalqilya

Government
  - Type: Local Development Committee
- Elevation: 464 m (1,522 ft)

Population (2017)
  - Total: 1,943
- Name meaning: Baka, from personal name

Baqat al-Hatab (Arabic: باقة الحطب) is a village in the Qalqilya Governorate, Palestine in the western area of the West Bank, located 20 kilometers southwest of Nablus. According to the Palestinian Central Bureau of Statistics, the village had a population of 1,943 inhabitants in 2017.

== Location ==
Baqat al-Hatab is located 14.35 kilometers (8.92 mi) northwest of Qalqiliya. It is bordered by Hajja to the east, south and north; Kafr Laqif and Khirbet Sir to the south; ‘Izbat Abu Hammada to the west; and Kafr ‘Abbush to the west and north.

== History ==
=== Ottoman era ===
Baqat al-Hatab was incorporated into the Ottoman Empire in 1517, and in 1596 it appeared in the tax registers as being in the Nahiya of Bani Sa'b of the Liwa of the Sanjak of Nablus. The villagers paid a fixed tax rate of 33,3% on various agricultural products, such as wheat, barley, summer crops, goats and/or beehives, in addition to "occasional revenues"; a total of 23,900 akçe. 5,25/24 of the revenues went to a Muslim charitable endowment.

During the 18th century, residents of Baqat al-Hatab established Qalqiliya and al-Tira in Palestine's coastal plain.

An Ottoman census in 1288 AH (1871/1872 CE) listed the village in the nahiya (sub-district) of Bani Sa'b.

The PEF's Survey of Western Palestine (SWP) described Baka (Beni Sab) in 1882 as "a well-built stone village in a conspicuous position on a bare ridge, with a few olives, and a well to the north; it is a small place. A high house on the north side formed a trigonometrical station in 1873." It is historically the mother-village of many family hamula groups that now form the population of the Israeli township of Tira.

=== British Mandate era ===
An official land survey recorded 8,950 dunams of land in 1945. Of this, 645 dunams were for plantations or irrigated land, 1,688 were for cereals, while 36 dunams were built-up land.

=== Jordanian era ===
In the wake of the 1948 Arab–Israeli War, and after the 1949 Armistice Agreements, Baqat came under Jordanian occupation.

=== 1967-present ===
Since the Six-Day War in 1967, Baqat has been under Israeli rule.

After the Oslo II Accord in 1995, about 58.4% of the village land is defined in Area B, while the remainder 41.6% is in Area C.

=== Maqam ash-Sheikh Ali a-Najdi ===
The village of Baqat al-Hatab is home to the maqam (tomb-shrine) of ash-Sheikh Ali a-Najdi< a tomb located inside a cave next to a well. According to local tradition, ash-Sheikh Ali a-Najdi came from the Najd region of the Arabian Peninsula, in modern-day Saudi Arabia, and arrived in the village during the 19th century. He taught the Quran to the children of the village, and tradition says he committed miraculous acts.

== Demography ==
Baqat had a population of 59 households in 1596, all Muslims.

The British Mandate authorities conducted a census in 1922, Baqat had a population of 207 Muslims. By the 1931 census, the village had a population of 282 Muslims, with 63 houses. The population in the 1945 census was 390 Muslims.

The Jordanian census of 1961 found 569 inhabitants in Baqa Hatab.

The Palestinian Central Bureau of Statistics census in 2017 recorded 1943 residents.

=== Local origins ===
The village's residents have their origins in Hajjah, Qalqiliya, and the Sharon plain.

== Bibliography ==
- Barron, J.B., ed. (1923). Palestine: Report and General Abstracts of the Census of 1922. Government of Palestine.
- Conder, C.R.; Kitchener, H.H. (1882). The Survey of Western Palestine: Memoirs of the Topography, Orography, Hydrography, and Archaeology. Vol. 2. London: Committee of the Palestine Exploration Fund.
- Government of Jordan, Department of Statistics (1964). First Census of Population and Housing. Volume I: Final Tables; General Characteristics of the Population (PDF).
- Government of Palestine, Department of Statistics (1945). Village Statistics, April, 1945.
- Hadawi, S. (1970). Village Statistics of 1945: A Classification of Land and Area ownership in Palestine. Palestine Liberation Organization Research Center.
- Hütteroth, W.-D.; Abdulfattah, K. (1977). Historical Geography of Palestine, Transjordan and Southern Syria in the Late 16th Century. Erlanger Geographische Arbeiten, Sonderband 5. Erlangen, Germany: Vorstand der Fränkischen Geographischen Gesellschaft. ISBN 3-920405-41-2.
- Mills, E., ed. (1932). Census of Palestine 1931. Population of Villages, Towns and Administrative Areas. Jerusalem: Government of Palestine.
- Palmer, E.H. (1881). The Survey of Western Palestine: Arabic and English Name Lists Collected During the Survey by Lieutenants Conder and Kitchener, R. E. Transliterated and Explained by E.H. Palmer. Committee of the Palestine Exploration Fund.
